= List of libraries in Victoria =

The following is a list of libraries in Victoria, Australia.

== State library ==
- State Library Victoria

== Academic libraries ==
=== Theological libraries ===
- Carmelite Library (Affiliated with the University of Divinity)
- Mannix Library (Catholic Theological College)

=== Universities ===
- Baillieu Library (University of Melbourne)
- Borchardt Library (La Trobe University)
- Deakin Library (Deakin University)
- MacFarland Library (Ormond College, University of Melbourne)
- RMIT University Library (RMIT University)
- Sir Louis Matheson Library (Monash University)
- Victoria University Library (Victoria University)

== Public libraries ==
Public library services in the state are managed by local councils or regional library corporations and are represented by Public Libraries Victoria.

=== Greater Melbourne ===
- Bayside Libraries (City of Bayside)
- Brimbank Libraries (City of Brimbank)
- Boroondara Library Service (City of Boroondara)
- Connected Libraries (Formerly Casey Cardinia Libraries) (City of Casey)
- Darebin Libraries (City of Darebin)
- Frankston City Libraries (City of Frankston)
- Glen Eira Libraries (City of Glen Eira)
- Greater Dandenong Libraries (City of Greater Dandenong)
- Hobsons Bay Libraries (City of Hobsons Bay)
- Hume Libraries (City of Hume)
- Kingston Libraries (City of Kingston)
- Maribyrnong Library Service (City of Maribyrnong)
- Melbourne Library Service (City of Melbourne)
- Melton City Libraries (City of Melton)
- Merri-bek Libraries (City of Merri-bek)
- Monash Public Library Service (City of Monash)
- Moonee Valley Libraries (City of Moonee Valley)
- Mornington Peninsula Libraries (Shire of Mornington Peninsula)
- Port Phillip Library Service (City of Port Phillip)
- Stonnington Library and Information Service (City of Stonnington)
- Whitehorse Manningham Libraries (City of Manningham and City of Whitehorse)
- Wyndham City Libraries (City of Wyndham)
- Yarra Libraries (City of Yarra)
- Yarra Plenty Regional Library (City of Banyule, City of Whittlesea and Shire of Nillumbik)
- Your Library (Formerly Eastern Regional Libraries) (City of Knox, City of Maroondah and Yarra Ranges Shire)

=== Regional and rural libraries ===
- Buloke Shire Library Services (Shire of Buloke)
- Campaspe Regional Library Service (Shire of Campaspe)
- Central Highlands Libraries (Rural City of Ararat, Shire of Southern Grampians, City of Ballarat, Shire of Moorabool, Shire of Northern Grampians, Shire of Pyrenees, Shire of Hepburn, Shire of Central Goldfields)
- Corangamite Moyne Library Service (Shire of Corangamite and Shire of Moyne)
- East Gippsland Shire Library (Shire of East Gippsland)
- Gannawarra Library Service (Shire of Gannawarra)
- Geelong Regional Libraries (City of Greater Geelong, Surf Coast Shire, Golden Plains Shire, Borough of Queenscliffe, Shire of Colac Otway)
- Goldfield Libraries (City of Greater Bendigo, Shire of Loddon, Shire of Macedon Ranges, and Shire of Mount Alexander)
- Goulburn Valley Libraries (Shire of Moira, Shire of Strathbogie and City of Greater Shepparton)
- High Country Library Network (Alpine Shire, Rural City of Benalla, Shire of Murrindindi)
- Hindmarsh Shire Libraries (Shire of Hindmarsh)
- Hyphen [Wodonga Library and Gallery] (City of Wodonga)
- Indigo Shire Libraries (Shire of Indigo)
- Latrobe City Libraries (City of Latrobe)
- Mildura Rural City Council Libraries (City of Mildura)
- Mitchell Shire Libraries (Shire of Mitchell)
- Myli - My Community Library (Bass Coast Shire, Shire of Baw Baw, Shire of South Gippland, Shire of Cardinia (Note: Cardinia Shire is part of the Greater Melbourne metropolitan region))
- Swan Hill Library (City of Swan Hill)
- Towong Shire Libraries (Shire of Towong)
- Wargaratta Library (Rural City of Wangaratta)
- Warrnambool Library and Learning Centre (City of Warrnambool; within the Warrambool TAFE)
- Wellington Libraries (Shire of Wellington)
- Wimmera Regional Library Corporation (City of Horsham and West Wimmera Shire)
- Yarriamback Shire Libraries (Shire of Yarriambiack)

== Special libraries ==
- Australian Queer Archives
- Melbourne Athenaeum
- PMI Victorian History Library
- NGV Research Collection and Archive (National Gallery of Victoria)
- Victorian Parliamentary Library & Information Service
- Xin Jin Shan Chinese Library (Ballarat) (Chinese-language library)

== See also ==
- List of libraries in Melbourne
