= List of acts of the Parliament of Victoria from 2024 =

This is a list of acts of the Parliament of Victoria, Australia for the year 2024.

== 2024 ==
Short title, or popular name	Citation	Royal assent
Long title
Biosecurity Legislation Amendment (Incident Response) Act 2024	No. 1 of 2024	13 February 2024
An Act to amend the Livestock Disease Control Act 1994, (Note: Livestock Disease Control Act 1994 (No. 115 of 1994)) the Plant Biosecurity Act 2010 (Note: Plant Biosecurity Act 2010 (No. 60 of 2010)) and the Livestock Management Act 2010 (Note: Livestock Management Act 2010 (No. 15 of 2010)) and for other purposes.
Justice Legislation Amendment (Police and Other Matters) Act 2024	No. 2 of 2024	
Land (Revocation of Reservations) Act 2024	No. 3 of 2024	
Building Legislation Amendment (Domestic Building Insurance New Offences) Act 2024	No. 4 of 2024	
Service Victoria Amendment Act 2024	No. 5 of 2024	
Regulatory Legislation Amendment (Reform) Act 2024	No. 6 of 2024	
Education and Training Reform Amendment (Early Childhood Employment Powers) Act 2024	No. 7 of 2024	
Workplace Injury Rehabilitation and Compensation Amendment (WorkCover Scheme Modernisation) Act 2024	No. 8 of 2024	
Climate Change and Energy Legislation Amendment (Renewable Energy and Storage Targets) Act 2024	No. 9 of 2024	
Firearms and Control of Weapons (Machetes) Amendment Act 2024	No. 10 of 2024	
State Electricity Commission Amendment Act 2024 (repealed)	No. 11 of 2024	26 March 2024
An Act to amend the State Electricity Commission Act 1958 (Note: State Electricity Commission Act 1958 (No. 6377)) to abolish the State Electricity Commission of Victoria established by that Act, to make related amendments to that Act and other Acts and for other purposes. (Repealed by State Electricity Commission Amendment Act 2024 (No. 11 of 2024))
Private Security and County Court Amendment Act 2024	No. 12 of 2024	
Statute Law Revision Act 2024 (repealed)	No. 13 of 2024	23 April 2024
An Act to revise the statute law of Victoria. (Repealed by Statute Law Revision Act 2024 (No. 13 of 2024))
Energy and Public Land Legislation Amendment (Enabling Offshore Wind Energy) Act 2024	No. 14 of 2024	
National Electricity (Victoria) Amendment (VicGrid) Act 2024	No. 15 of 2024	
Commercial and Industrial Property Tax Reform Act 2024	No. 16 of 2024	
Estate Agents, Residential Tenancies and Other Acts Amendment (Funding) Act 2024	No. 17 of 2024	
National Energy Retail Law (Victoria) Act 2024	No. 18 of 2024	
Appropriation (2024-2025) Act 2024	No. 19 of 2024	4 June 2024
An Act for the appropriation of certain sums out of the Consolidated Fund for the ordinary annual services of the Government for the financial year 2024/2025 and for other purposes.
Appropriation (Parliament 2024-2025) Act 2024	No. 20 of 2024	4 June 2024
An Act for the appropriation of certain sums out of the Consolidated Fund for the Parliament in respect of the financial year 2024/2025 and for other purposes.
Financial Management Amendment (Gender Responsive Budgeting) Act 2024	No. 21 of 2024	
State Taxation Amendment Act 2024	No. 22 of 2024	
Local Government Amendment (Governance and Integrity) Act 2024	No. 23 of 2024	
Sustainable Forests (Timber) Repeal Act 2024	No. 24 of 2024	
Victorian Responsible Gambling Foundation Repeal and Advisory Councils Act 2024	No. 25 of 2024	
Confiscation Amendment (Unexplained Wealth) Act 2024	No. 26 of 2024	
Parliamentary Workplace Standards and Integrity Act 2024	No. 27 of 2024	20 August 2024
An Act to establish a Parliamentary Workplace Standards and Integrity Commission, Parliamentary Integrity Adviser and Parliamentary Ethics Committee, to make consequential and related amendments to Acts and for other purposes.
State Sporting Legislation Amendment Act 2024	No. 28 of 2024	
Aboriginal Land Legislation Amendment Act 2024	No. 29 of 2024	
Prahran Mechanics' Institute Repeal Act 2024	No. 30 of 2024	3 September 2024
An Act to repeal the Prahran Mechanics' Institute Act 1899, (Note: Prahran Mechanics' Institute Act 1899 (63 Vict. No. 1617)) to dissolve the Prahran Mechanics' Institution and Circulating Library incorporated and to provide for the transfer of property, rights and liabilities of that entity to the PMI Victorian History Library Inc., and for other purposes.
Justice Legislation Amendment (Integrity, Defamation and Other Matters) Act 2024	No. 31 of 2024	
Youth Justice Act 2024	No. 32 of 2024	10 September 2024
An Act to provide for the reform of the youth justice system, to amend the Children, Youth and Families Act 2005 (Note: Children, Youth and Families Act 2005 (No. 96 of 2005)) and other related Acts and for other purposes.
Residential Tenancies and Funerals Amendment Act 2024	No. 33 of 2024	
Victorian Institute of Forensic Medicine Act 2024	No. 34 of 2024	
State Civil Liability (Police Informants) Act 2024	No. 35 of 2024	
Constitution Amendment (SEC) Act 2024 (Note: SEC is a reference to the State Electricity Commission of Victoria.)	No. 36 of 2024	22 October 2024
An Act to amend the Constitution Act 1975 (Note: Constitution Act 1975 (No. 8750)) and for other purposes.
Criminal Organisations Control Amendment Act 2024	No. 37 of 2024	
Melbourne Convention and Exhibition Trust Amendment Act 2024	No. 38 of 2024	
Health Legislation Amendment (Regulatory Reform) Act 2024	No. 39 of 2024	
Short Stay Levy Act 2024	No. 40 of 2024	
Drugs, Poisons and Controlled Substances Amendment (Pill Testing) Act 2024	No. 41 of 2024	
Offshore Petroleum and Greenhouse Gas Storage Amendment Act 2024	No. 42 of 2024	
Building Legislation Amendment and Other Matters Act 2024	No. 43 of 2024	
Agriculture and Food Safety Legislation Amendment Act 2024	No. 44 of 2024	
Duties Amendment (More Homes) Act 2024	No. 45 of 2024	
Roads and Road Safety Legislation Amendment Act 2024	No. 46 of 2024	
Subordinate Legislation and Administrative Arrangements Amendment Act 2024	No. 47 of 2024	
Transport Infrastructure and Planning Legislation Amendment Act 2024	No. 48 of 2024	
Aged Care Restrictive Practices Substitute Decision-maker Act 2024	No. 49 of 2024	
State Taxation Further Amendment Act 2024	No. 50 of 2024	
Tobacco Amendment (Tobacco Retailer and Wholesaler Licensing Scheme) Act 2024	No. 51 of 2024	3 December 2024
An Act to amend the Tobacco Act 1987 to establish a licensing scheme for tobacco retailers and wholesalers and make related and other amendments, to make consequential amendments to the Confiscation Act 1997, (Note: Confiscation Act 1997 (No. 108 of 1997)) the Drugs, Poisons and Controlled Substances Act 1981 (Note: Drugs, Poisons and Controlled Substances Act 1981 (No. 9719)) and the Spent Convictions Act 2021 (Note: Spent Convictions Act 2021 (No. 13 of 2021)) and for other purposes.

== Sources ==
- "Acts as made: 2024". Victoria Legislation.
