= List of acts of the Parliament of Victoria from 1912 =

This is a list of acts of the Parliament of Victoria, Australia for the year 1912.

== 1912 ==
| Short title, or popular name | Citation | Royal assent |
Long title
| Savings Banks Act 1911 (Note: Although the short title of this act ends "... Act 1911", it was passed in the year 1912.) | 2 Geo. V. No. 2348 | 4 January 1912 |
An Act to further amend the Savings Banks Acts.
| Benalla to Tatong Railway Construction Act 1911 | 2 Geo. V. No. 2349 | 4 January 1912 |
An Act to authorize the Construction by the State of a Line of Railway from Benalla to Tatong.
| Rushworth to Colbinabbin Railway Construction Act 1911 | 2 Geo. V. No. 2350 | 4 January 1912 |
An Act to authorize the Construction by the State of a Line of Railway from Rushworth to Colbinabbin.
| Crowland to Navarre Railway Construction Act 1911 | 2 Geo. V. No. 2351 | 4 January 1912 |
An Act to authorize the Construction by the State of a Line of Railway from Crowland to Navarre.
| Railway Loan Application Act 1911 (No. 2) | 2 Geo. V. No. 2352 | 4 January 1912 |
An Act to sanction the issue and application of certain Sums of Money available under Loan Acts for Railways.
| Victorian Manganese Mines Iron and Steel Company's Railway Act 1911 (No. 2) | 2 Geo. V. No. 2353 | 4 January 1912 |
An Act to amend Section fifteen of the Victorian Manganese Mines Iron and Steel Company's Railway Act 1911. (Note: Victorian Manganese Mines Iron and Steel Company's Railway Act 1911 (2 Geo. V. No. 2331))
| Millewa Land Act 1911 | 2 Geo. V. No. 2354 | 4 January 1912 |
An Act to revoke the Permanent Reservation as Endowments for State Agricultural Colleges and Experimental Farms of certain Crown Lands in the County of Millewa and for other purposes.
| Public Works Loan Application Act 1911 | 2 Geo. V. No. 2355 | 4 January 1912 |
An Act to sanction the issue and application of certain Sums of Money available under Loan Acts for Public Works and other purposes.
| | 2 Geo. V. No. 2356 | 4 January 1912 |
An Act to apply a sum out of the Consolidated Revenue to the service of the year ending on the thirtieth day of June One thousand nine hundred and twelve and to appropriate the Supplies granted in this and the last preceding Session of Parliament.
| | 3 Geo. V. No. 2357 | 11 July 1912 |
An Act to apply out of the Consolidated Revenue the sum of One million nine hundred and ninety-eight thousand three hundred and sixteen pounds to the service of the year One thousand nine hundred and twelve and One thousand nine hundred and thirteen.
| Frankston Land Act 1912 | 3 Geo. V. No. 2358 | 12 August 1912 |
An Act to revoke the permanent reservation for Watering Purposes of certain Land in the Parish of Frankston.
| Flood Protection Act 1912 (repealed) | 3 Geo. V. No. 2359 | 12 August 1912 |
An Act to amend the Flood Protection Act 1911. (Note: Flood Protection Act 1911 (2 Geo. V. No. 2345)) (Repealed by Water Act 1915 (6 Geo. V. No. 2747))
| Creswick Land Act 1912 | 3 Geo. V. No. 2360 | 12 August 1912 |
An Act to provide for the resumption by and transfer to the Crown of certain Lands in the Parish of Creswick and for other purposes.
| Special Funds Act 1912 | 3 Geo. V. No. 2361 | 19 August 1912 |
An Act to amend Section Seven of the Special Funds Act 1910. (Note: Special Funds Act 1910 (1 Geo. V. No. 2297))
| Chaff and Stock Food Continuance Act 1912 | 3 Geo. V. No. 2362 | 19 August 1912 |
An Act to revive and continue the Chaff and Stock Food Acts.
| | 3 Geo. V. No. 2363 | 30 August 1912 |
An Act to apply out of the Consolidated Revenue the sum of Four hundred and eighty-seven thousand five hundred and eighty-eight pounds to the service of the year One thousand nine hundred and eleven and One thousand nine hundred and twelve.
| Instruments Act 1890 Amendment Act 1912 or the Instruments Act 1912 (repealed) | 3 Geo. V. No. 2364 | 24 September 1912 |
An Act to amend the Instruments Act 1890 (Note: Instruments Act 1890 (54 Vict. No. 1103)) in relation to Bills of Sale and other Instruments required by that Act to be filed or registered. (Repealed by Instruments Act 1915 (6 Geo. V. No. 2672))
| Savings Banks Act 1912 | 3 Geo. V. No. 2365 | 24 September 1912 |
An Act to further amend the Savings Banks Acts.
| Mining Leases Act 1912 (repealed) | 3 Geo. V. No. 2366 | 3 October 1912 |
An Act to amend the Mines Acts so far as relates to Leases thereunder. (Repealed by Mines Act 1915 (6 Geo. V. No. 2698))
| Training Ships Act 1912 (repealed) | 3 Geo. V. No. 2367 | 3 October 1912 |
An Act relating to Training Ships. (Repealed by Training Ships Act 1915 (6 Geo. V. No. 2738))
| Electric Light and Power Act 1912 (repealed) | 3 Geo. V. No. 2368 | 10 October 1912 |
An Act to amend the Electric Light and Power Act 1896. (Note: Electric Light and Power Act 1896 (59 Vict. No. 1413)) (Repealed by Electric Light and Power Act 1915 (6 Geo. V. No. 2645))
| Administration and Probate Act 1912 (repealed) | 3 Geo. V. No. 2369 | 10 October 1912 |
An Act to further amend the Administration and Probate Acts. (Repealed by Administration and Probate Act 1915 (6 Geo. V. No. 2611))
| Marine Stores and Old Metals Act 1912 (repealed) | 3 Geo. V. No. 2370 | 10 October 1912 |
An Act to amend Section Seven of the Marine Stores and Old Metals Act 1890. (Note: Marine Stores and Old Metals Act 1890 (54 Vict. No. 1114)) (Repealed by Marine Stores and Old Metals Act 1915 (6 Geo. V. No. 2689))
| | 3 Geo. V. No. 2371 | 10 October 1912 |
An Act to apply out of the Consolidated Revenue the sum of One million two hundred and forty-three thousand and thirty pounds to the service of the year One thousand nine hundred and twelve and One thousand nine hundred and thirteen.
| Colonial Mutual Life Assurance Society Act 1912 | 3 Geo. V. No. 2372 | 22 October 1912 |
An Act relating to The Colonial Mutual Life Assurance Society Limited.
| Game Act 1912 (repealed) | 3 Geo. V. No. 2373 | 6 November 1912 |
An Act to amend the Game Acts. (Repealed by Game Act 1915 (6 Geo. V. No. 2653))
| Wyndham Race-course Act 1912 | 3 Geo. V. No. 2374 | 16 November 1912 |
An Act relating to the Wyndham Race-course.
| Melbourne Lands Exchange Act 1912 (repealed) | 3 Geo. V. No. 2375 | 16 November 1912 |
An Act to provide for the Exchange of a certain piece of Land vested for certain purposes in the Mayor Aldermen Councillors and Citizens of the City of Melbourne for a certain piece of Land in which the Metropolitan Gas Company is registered as the proprietor of an estate in fee simple and for other purposes. (Repealed by Statute Law Revision Act 1984 (No. 10087))
| Spirit Merchants' Licences Act 1912 (repealed) | 3 Geo. V. No. 2376 | 16 November 1912 |
An Act to amend the Law relating to Spirit Merchants' Licences. (Repealed by Licensing Act 1915 (6 Geo. V. No. 2683))
| Dunolly State School Site Act 1912 | 3 Geo. V. No. 2377 | 16 November 1912 |
An Act to enable the Board of Land and Works and the Mayor Councillors and Burgesses of the Borough of Dunolly to transfer a portion of a certain piece of Land vested as a Site for Public Gardens at Dunolly to the Minister of Public Instruction and his Successors and for other purposes.
| Natimuk and Goroke Railway Act 1912 | 3 Geo. V. No. 2378 | 16 November 1912 |
An Act to amend the Natimuk and Goroke Railway Construction Act 1893. (Note: Natimuk and Goroke Railway Construction Act 1893 (56 Vict. No. 1292))
| Pounds Act 1912 (repealed) | 3 Geo. V. No. 2379 | 25 November 1912 |
An Act to amend the Pounds Act 1890. (Note: Pounds Act 1890 (54 Vict. No. 1129)) (Repealed by Pounds Act 1915 (6 Geo. V. No. 2710))
| Pea Rifles and Saloon Guns Act 1912 (repealed) | 3 Geo. V. No. 2380 | 25 November 1912 |
An Act to restrict the use of Pea Rifles and Saloon Guns by young persons. (Repealed by Police Offences Act 1915 (6 Geo. V. No. 2708))
| Developmental Railways Act 1912 (repealed) | 3 Geo. V. No. 2381 | 25 November 1912 |
An Act relating to Developmental Railways in Country Districts. (Repealed by Developmental Railways Act 1915 (6 Geo. V. No. 2640))
| | 3 Geo. V. No. 2382 | 2 December 1912 |
An Act to apply out of the Consolidated Revenue the sum of Five hundred and ninety thousand seven hundred and seventy-seven pounds to the service of the year One thousand nine hundred and twelve and One thousand nine hundred and thirteen.
| Public Service Act 1912 (repealed) | 3 Geo. V. No. 2383 | 2 December 1912 |
An Act to further amend the Public Service Acts and for other purposes. (Repealed by Public Service Act 1915 (6 Geo. V. No. 2713))
| Vehicles Act 1912 (repealed) | 3 Geo. V. No. 2384 | 2 December 1912 |
An Act relating to the Illegal Taking or Use of Vehicles. (Repealed by Police Offences Act 1915 (6 Geo. V. No. 2708))
| Richmond Land Act 1912 | 3 Geo. V. No. 2385 | 2 December 1912 |
An Act to enable the Mayor Councillors and Citizens of the City of Richmond to convey and transfer to the King certain Lands vested in them and for other purposes.
| Factories and Shops Act 1912 (repealed) | 3 Geo. V. No. 2386 | 7 December 1912 |
An Act to consolidate the Law relating to the Supervision and Regulation of Factories and Shops. (Repealed by Factories and Shops Act 1915 (6 Geo. V. No. 2650))
| Geelong Land Act 1912 | 3 Geo. V. No. 2387 | 7 December 1912 |
An Act to provide for the Sale of certain Lands at Geelong and for other purposes.
| Surplus Revenue Act 1912 | 3 Geo. V. No. 2388 | 7 December 1912 |
An Act relating to the Surplus Revenue of the Financial Year ended on the thirtieth day of June One thousand nine hundred and twelve and to certain unexpended balances under Surplus Revenue Act 1905. (Note: Surplus Revenue Act 1905 (5 Edw. VII. No. 1969))
| Beech Forest and Crowe's Railway Construction Trust (Indemnity) Act 1912 | 3 Geo. V. No. 2389 | 7 December 1912 |
An Act to Indemnify the members of the Beech Forest and Crowe's Railway Construction Trust for not repaying Moneys obtained by Overdraft of Current Account within two years of the constitution of such Trust and for other purposes.
| Gheringhap to Maroona Railway Construction Trust (Indemnity) Act 1912 | 3 Geo. V. No. 2390 | 7 December 1912 |
An Act to indemnify the members of the Gheringhap to Maroona Railway Construction Trust for not repaying Moneys obtained by Overdraft of Current Account in certain banks within two years of the constitution of such Trust and for other purposes.
| Fisheries Act 1912 (repealed) | 3 Geo. V. No. 2391 | 7 December 1912 |
An Act to amend the Fisheries Act 1890 (Note: Fisheries Act 1890 (54 Vict. No. 1093)) and for other purposes. (Repealed by Fisheries Act 1915 (6 Geo. V. No. 2654))
| Melbourne and Metropolitan Board of Works Act 1912 (repealed) | 3 Geo. V. No. 2392 | 7 December 1912 |
An Act to further amend the Melbourne and Metropolitan Board of Works Acts. (Repealed by Melbourne and Metropolitan Board of Works Act 1915 (6 Geo. V. No. 2696))
| Prahran Mechanics' Institute Act 1912 (repealed) | 3 Geo. V. No. 2393 | 7 December 1912 |
An Act to amend the Prahran Mechanics' Institute Act 1899. (Note: Prahran Mechanics' Institute Act 1899 (63 Vict. No. 1617)) (Repealed by Statute Law Revision Act 1995 (No. 11 of 1995))
| Melbourne Land Act 1912 (repealed) | 3 Geo. V. No. 2394 | 7 December 1912 |
An Act to vest in the Melbourne Harbor Trust Commissioners certain land and to vest in the King certain other land and for other purposes. (Repealed by Statute Law Revision Act 1984 (No. 10087))
| City of Ballaarat Free Library and Reading Rooms Act 1912 | 3 Geo. V. No. 2395 | 7 December 1912 |
An Act to enable the Trustees of the Ballaarat Free Library and Reading Rooms to raise Money by way of Mortgage to pay off existing Liabilities and for other purposes.
| Prahran and Malvern Tramways Trust Act 1912 | 3 Geo. V. No. 2396 | 7 December 1912 |
An Act to amend the Prahran and Malvern Tramways Trust Act 1910. (Note: Prahran and Malvern Tramways Trust Act 1910 (1 Geo. V. No. 2294))
| Thornbury Land Act 1912 | 3 Geo. V. No. 2397 | 7 December 1912 |
An Act to provide for the Issue of a Lease of certain Crown Land at Thornbury.
| Fitzroy State School Site Act 1912 | 3 Geo. V. No. 2398 | 7 December 1912 |
An Act to enable the Trustees of a certain piece of Land vested as a Site for a Licensed Victuallers' Asylum to transfer the same to the Minister of Public Instruction and his Successors and for other purposes.
| Senate Elections (Times and Places) Act 1912 (repealed) | 3 Geo. V. No. 2399 | 7 December 1912 |
An Act to amend the Senate Elections (Times and Places) Act 1903. (Note: Senate Elections (Times and Places) Act 1903 (3 Edw. VII. No. 1860)) (Repealed by Senate Elections (Times and Places) Act 1915 (6 Geo. V. No. 2723))
| Agricultural Colleges Act 1912 (repealed) | 3 Geo. V. No. 2400 | 7 December 1912 |
An Act to further amend the Agricultural Colleges Act 1890 (Note: Agricultural Colleges Act 1890 (54 Vict. No. 1062)) and for other purposes. (Repealed by Agricultural Colleges Act 1915 (6 Geo. V. No. 2613))
| Inter-State Destitute Persons Relief Act 1912 (repealed) | 3 Geo. V. No. 2401 | 7 December 1912 |
An Act for the Relief of Persons whose Relatives liable to support them reside in another State of the Commonwealth, and for other purposes. (Repealed by Inter-State Destitute Persons Relief Act 1915 (6 Geo. V. No. 2673))
| Milk and Dairy Supervision Act 1912 (repealed) | 3 Geo. V. No. 2402 | 7 December 1912 |
An Act to amend the Milk and Dairy Supervision Act 1905. (Note: Milk and Dairy Supervision Act 1905 (5 Edw. VII. No. 2011)) (Repealed by Dairy Supervision Act 1915 (6 Geo. V. No. 2639))
| Victorian Government Stock Act 1912 (repealed) | 3 Geo. V. No. 2403 | 11 December 1912 |
An Act to amend the Victorian Government Stock Act 1896 (Note: Victorian Government Stock Act 1896 (60 Vict. No. 1468)) and for other purposes. (Repealed by Treasury Legislation (Repeal) Act 2005 (No. 73 of 2005))
| Victorian Government Debentures Regulation Act 1912 (repealed) | 3 Geo. V. No. 2404 | 11 December 1912 |
An Act to regulate the issue of Victorian Government Debentures and for other purposes. (Repealed by Treasury Legislation (Repeal) Act 2005 (No. 73 of 2005))
| Land Tax Act 1912 (repealed) | 3 Geo. V. No. 2405 | 11 December 1912 |
An Act to declare the Kate of Land Tax for the Year ending the thirty-first day of December One thousand nine hundred and thirteen and for other purposes. (Repealed by Land Tax Act 1915 (6 Geo. V. No. 2680))
| Administration and Probate Duties Act 1912 (repealed) | 3 Geo. V. No. 2406 | 11 December 1912 |
An Act relating to Duties payable under the Administration and Probate Acts. (Repealed by Administration and Probate Act 1915 (6 Geo. V. No. 2611))
| Municipal Endowment Act 1912 | 3 Geo. V. No. 2407 | 11 December 1912 |
An Act relating to Municipal Endowment.
| Cocoroc Land Sale Act 1912 | 3 Geo. V. No. 2408 | 11 December 1912 |
An Act to revoke the Permanent Reservation of certain Land in the Parish of Cocoroc and for other purposes.
| Castlemaine Temperance Hall Act 1912 | 3 Geo. V. No. 2409 | 11 December 1912 |
An Act to provide for the Sale of a portion of a certain piece of Land reserved as a Site for a Temperance Hall at Castlemaine and for other purposes.
| Railway Deficiency Rate Abolition Act 1912 | 3 Geo. V. No. 2410 | 11 December 1912 |
An Act to provide for the Abolition of Annual Payments in connexion with certain Lines of Railway and for other purposes.
| Health Act 1912 (repealed) | 3 Geo. V. No. 2411 | 23 December 1912 |
An Act to amend the Health Acts with regard to Vaccination Certificates. (Repealed by Health Act 1915 (6 Geo. V. No. 2665))
| Bendigo Land Act 1912 | 3 Geo. V. No. 2412 | 23 December 1912 |
An Act to revoke the Permanent Reservation of certain Land in the City of Bendigo.
| Teachers Act 1912 (repealed) | 3 Geo. V. No. 2413 | 23 December 1912 |
An Act to further amend the Law relating to State School Teachers. (Repealed by Public Service Act 1915 (6 Geo. V. No. 2713))
| Tallangatta to Cudgewa Railway Construction Act 1912 | 3 Geo. V. No. 2414 | 23 December 1912 |
An Act to authorize the Construction by the State of a Line of Railway from Tallangatta to Cudgewa.
| Country Roads Act 1912 (repealed) | 3 Geo. V. No. 2415 | 23 December 1912 |
An Act relating to Country Roads. (Repealed by Country Roads Act 1915 (6 Geo. V. No. 2635))
| Tallangatta Land 1912 | 3 Geo. V. No. 2416 | 23 December 1912 |
An Act to revoke the Permanent Reservation of certain Land at Tallangatta and for other purposes.
| Swan Hill to Piangil Railway Construction Act 1912 | 3 Geo. V. No. 2417 | 23 December 1912 |
An Act to authorize the Construction by the State of a Line of Railway from Swan Hill to Piangil.
| Chillingollah to Manangatang Railway Construction Act 1912 | 3 Geo. V. No. 2418 | 23 December 1912 |
An Act to authorize the Construction by the State of a Line of Railway from Chillingollah to Manangatang.
| Sea Lake towards Pier-Millan Railway Construction Act 1912 | 3 Geo. V. No. 2419 | 23 December 1912 |
An Act to authorize the Construction by the State of a Line of Railway from 8ea Lake towards Pier-Millan.
| Wonthaggi Land Act 1912 (repealed) | 3 Geo. V. No. 2420 | 23 December 1912 |
An Act relating to Leasing and Sale of Crown Lands in the Township of Wonthaggi and for other purposes. (Repealed by Land Act 1915 (6 Geo. V. No. 2676))
| Alexandra Park Act 1912 (repealed) | 3 Geo. V. No. 2421 | 23 December 1912 |
An Act to amend the Alexandra Park Act 1904. (Note: Alexandra Park Act 1904 (4 Edw. VII. No. 1937)) (Repealed by Statute Law Revision Act 1995 (No. 11 of 1995))
| Police Offences Act 1912 (repealed) | 3 Geo. V. No. 2422 | 23 December 1912 |
An Act to amend and consolidate the Law relating to Police Offences. (Repealed by Police Offences Act 1915 (6 Geo. V. No. 2708))
| Railway Funds Act 1912 | 3 Geo. V. No. 2423 | 23 December 1912 |
An Act relating to the Railway Funds.
| South Australian and Victorian Border Railways Act 1912 | 3 Geo. V. No. 2424 | 23 December 1912 |
An Act to approve and ratify and provide for carrying out an Agreement for the Construction and Working of certain Border Railways and purposes incidental thereto (including the Construction of a Railway from Heywood to Mumbannar) entered into between the Governments of the States of Victoria and South Australia.
| Oddfellows' Alms-houses Act 1912 | 3 Geo. V. No. 2425 | 23 December 1912 |
An Act to empower the Trustees of certain Land granted for Alms-houses to Borrow Money and for other purposes.
| | 3 Geo. V. No. 2426 | 23 December 1912 |
An Act to apply a sum out of the Consolidated Revenue to the service of the year ending on the thirtieth day of June One thousand nine hundred and thirteen and to appropriate the Supplies granted in this Session of Parliament.
| Income Tax Act 1912 (repealed) | 3 Geo. V. No. 2427 | 31 December 1912 |
An Act to declare the Rates of Income Tax for the Year ending on the thirty-first day of December One thousand nine hundred and thirteen and to amend the Income Tax Acts. (Repealed by Income Tax Act 1915 (6 Geo. V. No. 2668))
| Victorian Government Loan Act 1912 | 3 Geo. V. No. 2428 | 31 December 1912 |
An Act to authorize the raising of Money for Railways.
| Victorian Loan Act 1912 | 3 Geo. V. No. 2429 | 31 December 1912 |
An Act to authorize the raising of Money for Railways Public Works and other purposes.
| Railway Loan Application Act 1912 | 3 Geo. V. No. 2430 | 31 December 1912 |
An Act to sanction the issue and application of certain Sums of Money available under Loan Acts for Railways and for other purposes.
| Water Supply Loans Application Act 1912 | 3 Geo. V. No. 2431 | 31 December 1912 |
An Act to sanction the issue and application of certain Sums of Money available under Loan Acts for Irrigation Works and Water Supply Works in Country Districts and for Public Works and other purposes.
| Railways Advances Act 1912 | 3 Geo. V. No. 2432 | 31 December 1912 |
An Act to authorize the temporary application out of "The Public Account" of certain moneys for the purpose of substituting heavy rails for light rails on certain lines of railway.
| Elmore to Cohuna Railway Construction Act 1912 | 3 Geo. V. No. 2433 | 31 December 1912 |
An Act to authorize the Construction by the State of a Line of Railway from Elmore to Cohuna.
| Hamilton to Cavendish Railway Construction Act 1912 | 3 Geo. V. No. 2434 | 31 December 1912 |
An Act to authorize the Construction by the State of a Line of Railway from Hamilton to Cavendish.
| Registration of Births Deaths and Marriages Act 1912 (repealed) | 3 Geo. V. No. 2435 | 31 December 1912 |
An Act to amend the Law relating to the Legitimation of Children by Registration under the Registration of Births Deaths and Marriages Acts. (Repealed by Registration of Births Deaths and Marriages Act 1915 (6 Geo. V. No. 2720))
| Boilers Inspection Act 1912 (repealed) | 3 Geo. V. No. 2436 | 31 December 1912 |
An Act to amend the Boilers Inspection Act 1906. (Note: Boilers Inspection Act 1906 (6 Edw. VII. No. 2071)) (Repealed by Boilers Inspection Act 1915 (6 Geo. V. No. 2621))
| Supreme Court Act 1912 (repealed) | 3 Geo. V. No. 2437 | 31 December 1912 |
An Act to further amend the Supreme Court Act 1890. (Note: Supreme Court Act 1890 (54 Vict. No. 1142)) (Repealed by Supreme Court Act 1915 (6 Geo. V. No. 2733))
| Closer Settlement Act 1912 (repealed) | 3 Geo. V. No. 2438 | 31 December 1912 |
An Act to further amend the Closer Settlement Acts and for other purposes. (Repealed by Closer Settlement Act 1915 (6 Geo. V. No. 2629))
| Custody of Infants Act 1912 (repealed) | 3 Geo. V. No. 2439 | 31 December 1912 |
An Act to amend the Law as to the Guardianship and Custody of Infants. (Repealed by Marriage Act 1915 (6 Geo. V. No. 2691))
| Conveyancing Act 1912 (repealed) | 3 Geo. V. No. 2440 | 31 December 1912 |
An Act to further amend the Conveyancing Act 1904 (Note: Conveyancing Act 1904 (4 Edw. VII. No. 1953)) and for other purposes. (Repealed by Conveyancing Act 1915 (6 Geo. V. No. 2633))
| Rainbow towards Nypo Railway Construction Act 1912 | 3 Geo. V. No. 2441 | 31 December 1912 |
An Act to authorize the Construction by the State of a Line of Railway from Rainbow towards Nypo.
| Linton to Skipton Railway Construction Act 1912 | 3 Geo. V. No. 2442 | 31 December 1912 |
An Act to authorize the Construction by the State of a Line of Railway from Linton to Skipton.
| Mineral Springs Act 1912 (repealed) | 3 Geo. V. No. 2443 | 31 December 1912 |
An Act relating to Mineral Springs on Crown Lands. (Repealed by Land Act 1915 (6 Geo. V. No. 2676))
| Lifts Regulation Act 1912 (repealed) | 3 Geo. V. No. 2444 | 31 December 1912 |
An Act to amend Section Six of the Lifts Regulation Act 1906 (Note: Lifts Regulation Act 1906 (6 Edw. VII. No. 2048)) and for other purposes. (Repealed by Lifts Regulation Act 1915 (6 Geo. V. No. 2684))
| Reserves on Private Property and Improvement Charges Act 1912 (repealed) | 3 Geo. V. No. 2445 | 31 December 1912 |
An Act to amend the Law relating to the Laying Out of Streets Lanes or Passages on Private Property and for other purposes. (Repealed by Local Government Act 1915 (6 Geo. V. No. 2686))
| Licensing Districts Act 1912 (repealed) | 3 Geo. V. No. 2446 | 31 December 1912 |
An Act to amend the Licensing Acts with regard to determining the Number of Inhabitants of Licensing Districts and for other purposes. (Repealed by Licensing Act 1915 (6 Geo. V. No. 2683))
| Factories and Shops Act 1912 (No. 2) (repealed) | 3 Geo. V. No. 2447 | 31 December 1912 |
An Act to amend the Factories and Shops Act 1912. (Note: Factories and Shops Act 1912 (3 Geo. V. No. 2386)) (Repealed by Factories and Shops Act 1915 (6 Geo. V. No. 2650))
| Public Works Loan Application Act 1912 | 3 Geo. V. No. 2448 | 31 December 1912 |
An Act to sanction the issue and application of certain Sums of Money available under Loan Acts for Public Works and other purposes.
| Melbourne Harbor Trust Act 1912 (repealed) | 3 Geo. V. No. 2449 | 31 December 1912 |
An Act to further amend the Melbourne Harbor Trust Act 1890 (Note: Melbourne Harbor Trust Act 1890 (54 Vict. No. 1119)) and for other purposes. (Repealed by Melbourne Harbor Trust Act 1915 (6 Geo. V. No. 2697)

== Sources ==
- "1912 Victorian Historical Acts". AustLII.
