= List of acts of the Parliament of Victoria from 1914 =

This is a list of acts of the Parliament of Victoria, Australia for the year 1914.

== 1914 ==
Short title, or popular name	Citation	Royal assent
Long title
Rating on Unimproved Values Act 1914 (repealed)	4 Geo. V. No. 2478	3 February 1914
An Act to provide for the Optional Rating by Municipalities on the basis of the Unimproved Values of Rateable Property. (Repealed by Rating on Unimproved Values Act 1915 (6 Geo. V. No. 2817))
Workers' Dwellings Act 1914 (repealed)	4 Geo. V. No. 2479	3 February 1914
An Act to enable Municipal Councils to provide Workers' Dwellings and for other purposes. (Repealed by Local Government Act 1915 (6 Geo. V. No. 2686))
Victorian Government Loan Act 1914	4 Geo. V. No. 2480	3 February 1914
An Act to authorize the raising of Money for Railways.
Victorian Loan Act 1914	4 Geo. V. No. 2481	3 February 1914
An Act to authorize the raising of Money for Railways Public Works and other purposes.
Geelong Land Act 1914	4 Geo. V. No. 2482	3 February 1914
An Act to revoke the Permanent Reservation and Crown Grant of portion of certain Land in the City of Geelong as a Site for Botanical Gardens.
South Melbourne Lands Act 1914 (repealed)	4 Geo. V. No. 2483	3 February 1914
An Act to provide for the Exchange of certain Allotments of Private Lands in the City of South Melbourne for certain Allotments of Crown Land in the said City and for other purposes. (Repealed by Statute Law Revision Act 1984 (No. 10087))
Brunswick and Coburg Tramways Act 1914	4 Geo. V. No. 2484	17 February 1914
An Act to provide for the Construction and Management of certain Electric Tramways in the Municipal Districts of Brunswick and Coburg and for other purposes.
Mining Development Act 1914 (repealed)	4 Geo. V. No. 2485	17 February 1914
An Act to amend the Mining Development Acts and for other purposes. (Repealed by Mining Development Act 1915 (6 Geo. V. No. 2699))
Geelong Waterworks and Sewerage Act 1914 (repealed)	4 Geo. V. No. 2486	17 February 1914
An Act to further amend the Geelong Municipal Waterworks Act 1907. (Note: Geelong Municipal Waterworks Act 1907 (7 Edw. VII. No. 2109)) (Repealed by Geelong Waterworks and Sewerage Act 1915 (6 Geo. V. No. 2661))
Rushworth to Colbinabbin Railway Construction Amendment Act 1914	4 Geo. V. No. 2487	17 February 1914
An Act to amend the Rushworth to Colbinabbin Railway Construction Act 1911. (Note: Rushworth to Colbinabbin Railway Construction Act 1911 (2 Geo. V. No. 2350))
Melbourne to Burwood Tramways Act 1914	4 Geo. V. No. 2488	17 February 1914
An Act to provide for the Construction and Management of certain Electric Tramways in the Municipal Districts of Melbourne Richmond Hawthorn and Camberwell the Acquisition of a certain Horse Tramway and for other purposes.
Mines Act 1914 (repealed)	4 Geo. V. No. 2489	17 February 1914
An Act to further amend the Mines Acts and for other purposes. (Repealed by Mines Act 1915 (6 Geo. V. No. 2698))
Mildura Crown Grants Act 1914 (repealed)	4 Geo. V. No. 2490	17 February 1914
An Act to authorize the issuing of Crown Grants of certain Lands at Mildura. (Repealed by Statute Law Revision Act 1984 (No. 10087))
Kew Tramway Act 1914	4 Geo. V. No. 2491	17 February 1914
An Act to provide for the Construction and Management of an Electric Tramway in the Municipal District of Kew and certain adjoining Municipal Districts the Acquisition of a certain Horse Tramway and for other purposes.
Railway Loan Application Act 1914	4 Geo. V. No. 2492	17 February 1914
An Act to sanction the issue and application of certain Sums of Money available under Loan Acts for Railways and for other purposes.
Infectious Diseases Hospital Act 1914	4 Geo. V. No. 2493	17 February 1914
An Act relating to the Queen's Memorial Infectious Diseases Hospital at Fairfield.
Melbourne Tramways Trust Act 1914	4 Geo. V. No. 2494	17 February 1914
An Act to amend the Melbourne Tramways Trust Act 1903. (Note: Melbourne Tramways Trust Act 1903 (3 Edw. VII. No. 1841))
Metropolitan Fire Brigades Board Loan Act 1914 (repealed)	4 Geo. V. No. 2495	17 February 1914
An Act to authorize the Metropolitan Fire Brigades Board to borrow a further sum of One hundred thousand pounds and for other purposes. (Repealed by Fire Brigades Act 1915 (6 Geo. V. No. 2653))
Workers' Compensation Act 1914 (repealed)	4 Geo. V. No. 2496	20 February 1914
An Act to provide for Compensation to Workers for Injuries occurring in the course of their Employment. (Repealed by Workers' Compensation Act 1915 (6 Geo. V. No. 2750))
South Melbourne Tramways Act 1914	4 Geo. V. No. 2497	20 February 1914
An Act to provide for the Construction and Management of certain Electric Tramways in the Municipal District of South Melbourne and for other purposes.
Country Roads Act 1914 (repealed)	4 Geo. V. No. 2498	20 February 1914
An Act to amend the Country Roads Act 1912. (Note: Country Roads Act 1912 (3 Geo. V. No. 2415)) (Repealed by Country Roads Act 1915 (6 Geo. V. No. 2635))
Registration of Teachers and Schools Act 1914 (repealed)	4 Geo. V. No. 2499	20 February 1914
An Act to further amend the Registration of Teachers and Schools Act 1905 (Note: Registration of Teachers and Schools Act 1905 (5 Edw. VII. No. 2013)) and for other purposes. (Repealed by Education Act 1915 (6 Geo. V. No. 2644))
Prahran and Malvern Tramways Trust Act 1914	4 Geo. V. No. 2500	20 February 1914
An Act relating to the Borrowing Powers of the Prahran and Malvern Tramways Trust.
Railways Advances Act 1914	4 Geo. V. No. 2501	20 February 1914
An Act to apportion and extend the Time for the Repayments into "The Public Account" of certain Moneys advanced or to be advanced under the Railways Advances Act 1910 (Note: Railways Advances Act 1910 (1 Geo. V. No. 2268)) and the Railways Advances Act 1912. (Note: Railways Advances Act 1912 (3 Geo. V. No. 2432))
Cavendish to Toolondo Railway Construction Act 1914	4 Geo. V. No. 2502	20 February 1914
An Act to authorize the Construction by the State of a Line of Railway from Cavendish to Toolondo.
Water Supply Loans Application Act 1914	4 Geo. V. No. 2503	20 February 1914
An Act to sanction the issue and application of certain Sums of Money available under Loan Acts for Irrigation Works Water Supply Works Drainage and Flood Protection Works in Country Districts and for other purposes.
Neerim South to Toorongo River Railway Construction Act 1914	4 Geo. V. No. 2504	20 February 1914
An Act to authorize the Construction by the State of a Line of Railway from Neerim South to Toorongo River.
Crimes Act 1914 (repealed)	4 Geo. V. No. 2505	20 February 1914
An Act to amend the Crimes Acts. (Repealed by Crimes Act 1915 (6 Geo. V. No. 2637))
Income Tax Acts Amendment Act 1914 (repealed)	4 Geo. V. No. 2506	20 February 1914
An Act to amend the Income Tax Acts. (Repealed by Income Tax Act 1915 (6 Geo. V. No. 2668))
	4 Geo. V. No. 2507	20 February 1914
An Act to apply a sum out of the Consolidated Revenue to the service of the year ending on the thirtieth day of June One thousand nine hundred and fourteen and to appropriate the Supplies granted in this Session of Parliament.
	5 Geo. V. No. 2508	9 July 1914
An Act to apply out of the Consolidated Revenue the sum of One million eight hundred and sixteen thousand six hundred and three pounds to the service of the year One thousand nine hundred and fourteen and One thousand nine hundred and fifteen.
Wire Netting Act 1914 (repealed)	5 Geo. V. No. 2509	3 August 1914
An Act to amend Section Eleven and Section Thirteen of the Wire Netting Act 1909. (Note: Wire Netting Act 1909 (9 Edw. VII. No. 2181)) (Repealed by Vermin Destruction Act 1915 (6 Geo. V. No. 2745))
County Court Act 1890 Amendment Act 1914 (repealed)	5 Geo. V. No. 2510	24 August 1914
An Act to amend Section Twenty-two of the County Court Act 1890. (Note: County Court Act 1890 (54 Vict. No. 1078)) (Repealed by County Court Act 1915 (6 Geo. V. No. 2636))
Health Acts Amendment Act 1914 (repealed)	5 Geo. V. No. 2511	24 August 1914
An Act to further amend the Health Act 1890. (Note: Health Act 1890 (54 Vict. No. 1098)) (Repealed by Health Act 1915 (6 Geo. V. No. 2665))
Supreme Court Rules Act 1914 (repealed)	5 Geo. V. No. 2512	31 August 1914
An Act relating to the taking of Evidence in Victoria in relation to Civil and Commercial Matters pending before Foreign Tribunals. (Repealed by Supreme Court Act 1915 (6 Geo. V. No. 2733))
	5 Geo. V. No. 2513	7 September 1914
An Act to apply out of the Consolidated Revenue the sum of Three hundred and eighty thousand four hundred and sixty-one pounds to the service of the year One thousand nine hundred and thirteen and One thousand nine hundred and fourteen.
	5 Geo. V. No. 2514	7 September 1914
An Act to apply out of the Consolidated Revenue the sum of One million two hundred and forty-four thousand nine hundred and nineteen pounds to the service of the year One thousand nine hundred and fourteen and One thousand nine hundred and fifteen.
Caulfield Land Act 1914	5 Geo. V. No. 2515	7 September 1914
An Act to revoke the Permanent Reservation of portion of certain Land in the City of Caulfield as a Site for Public Recreation.
Price of Goods Act 1914	5 Geo. V. No. 2516	9 September 1914
An Act to make Provision against Undue Restriction of the Supply of Goods or Undue Raising of the Prices of Goods in Time of War.
Foodstuffs and Commodities Act 1914	5 Geo. V. No. 2517	10 September 1914
An Act relating to the Distribution Export and Prices of Foodstuffs and other Commodities and to compel the Supplying of Information in relation thereto.
Public Reserves Act 1914 (repealed)	5 Geo. V. No. 2518	21 September 1914
An Act to provide for the Vesting of Crown Lands permanently reserved from Sale for certain purposes on the Appointment of New Trustees thereof and for Committees of Management of certain Classes of Crown Lands so reserved. (Repealed by Land Act 1915 (6 Geo. V. No. 2676))
Police Regulation Act 1890 Amendment Act 1914 (repealed)	5 Geo. V. No. 2519	21 September 1914
An Act to further amend the Police Regulation Act 1890 (Note: Police Regulation Act 1890 (54 Vict. No. 1127)) and for other purposes. (Repealed by Police Regulation Act 1915 (6 Geo. V. No. 2709))
Carriage of Passengers Act 1914 (repealed)	5 Geo. V. No. 2520	21 September 1914
An Act relating to the Carriage of Passengers by Water. (Repealed by Instruments Act 1915 (6 Geo. V. No. 2672))
Saint Kilda Land Act 1914 or the St. Kilda Land Act 1914 (repealed)	5 Geo. V. No. 2521	21 September 1914
An Act to alter a Building Condition contained in Crown Grants of certain Allotments of Land situate in the City of Saint Kilda. (Repealed by Statute Law Revision Act 1984 (No. 10087))
Metropolitan Fire Brigades Board Loan (No. 2) Act 1914 (repealed)	5 Geo. V. No. 2522	21 September 1914
An Act to amend the Metropolitan Fire Brigades Board Loan Act 1914. (Note: Metropolitan Fire Brigades Board Loan Act 1914 (4 Geo. V. No. 2495)) (Repealed by Fire Brigades Act 1915 (6 Geo. V. No. 2653))
South Melbourne Loan Act 1914	5 Geo. V. No. 2523	21 September 1914
An Act to authorize the City of South Melbourne to construct and provide certain Permanent Works and Undertakings in lieu of certain other Permanent Works and Undertakings.
Benalla to Tatong Railway Construction Trust (Indemnity) Act 1914	5 Geo. V. No. 2524	21 September 1914
An Act to indemnify the Members of the Benalla to Tatong Railway Construction Trust for not repaying Moneys obtained by Overdraft of Current Account in a certain Bank within two years of the constitution of such Trust and for other purposes.
Poisons Acts Amendment Act 1914 (repealed)	5 Geo. V. No. 2525	21 September 1914
An Act to amend the Poisons Acts. (Repealed by Poisons Act 1915 (6 Geo. V. No. 2707))
Motor Car Act 1909 Amendment Act 1914 (repealed)	5 Geo. V. No. 2526	21 September 1914
An Act to amend the Law relating to Motor Cars. (Repealed by Motor Car Act 1915 (6 Geo. V. No. 2702))
Railway Lands Acquisition Acts Amendment Act 1914 (repealed)	5 Geo. V. No. 2527	21 September 1914
An Act to amend the Railway Lands Acquisition Acts. (Repealed by Railway Lands Acquisition Act 1915 (6 Geo. V. No. 2715))
Cobden Temperance Hall Act 1914	5 Geo. V. No. 2528	21 September 1914
An Act to provide for the Sale of certain Land permanently reserved as a Site for a Temperance Hall at Cobden and for other purposes.
Transfer of Land Act 1914 (repealed)	5 Geo. V. No. 2529	28 September 1914
An Act to amend the Transfer of Land Acts. (Repealed by Transfer of Land Act 1915 (6 Geo. V. No. 2740))
Victorian Government Loan Act 1914 (No. 2)	5 Geo. V. No. 2530	28 September 1914
An Act to authorize the raising of Money for Railways.
Victorian Loan Act 1914 (No. 2)	5 Geo. V. No. 2531	28 September 1915
An Act to authorize the raising of Money for Railways Public Works and other purposes.
Real Property Act 1914 (repealed)	5 Geo. V. No. 2532	28 September 1915
An Act to amend the Law relating to Real Property and for other purposes. (Repealed by Conveyancing Act 1915 (6 Geo. V. No. 2633))
Friendly Societies Acts Amendment Act 1914 (repealed)	5 Geo. V. No. 2533	5 October 1914
An Act to amend the Friendly Societies Acts. (Repealed by Friendly Societies Act 1915 (6 Geo. V. No. 2656))
Water Supply Loans Application Act 1914 (No. 2)	5 Geo. V. No. 2534	12 October 1914
An Act to sanction the issue and application of certain Sums of Money available under Loan Acts for Irrigation Works Water Supply Works Drainage and Flood Protection Works in Country Districts and for other purposes.
Koo-Wee-Rup to McDonald's Track Railway Construction Act 1914	5 Geo. V. No. 2535	12 October 1914
An Act to authorize the Construction by the State of a Line of Railway from Koo-wee-rup to McDonald's Track.
Railway Loan Application Act 1914 (No. 2)	5 Geo. V. No. 2536	12 October 1914
An Act to sanction the issue and application of certain Sums of Money available under Loan Acts for Railways and for other purposes.
Developmental Railways Account Transfer Act 1914	5 Geo. V. No. 2537	12 October 1914
An Act to provide for the Transfer of a sum of not more than Ninety thousand pounds from "The Developmental Railways Account" to the Consolidated Revenue.
Public Works Loan Application Act 1914	5 Geo. V. No. 2538	20 October 1914
An Act to sanction the issue and application of certain Sums of Money available under Loan Acts for Public Works and other purposes.
Lunacy Acts Amendment Act 1914 (repealed)	5 Geo. V. No. 2539	20 October 1914
An Act to amend the Lunacy Acts. (Repealed by Lunacy Act 1915 (6 Geo. V. No. 2687))
Apprentices Act 1914	5 Geo. V. No. 2540	20 October 1914
An Act to provide for the Payment of Apprentices during the War.
Melbourne Brunswick and Coburg Tramways Act 1914 (No. 2)	5 Geo. V. No. 2541	26 October 1914
An Act to amend the Brunswick and Coburg Tramways Act 1914. (Note: Brunswick and Coburg Tramways Act 1914 (4 Geo. V. No. 2484))
Alberton to Won Wron Railway Construction Act 1914	5 Geo. V. No. 2542	26 October 1914
An Act to authorize the Construction by the State of a Line of Railway from Alberton to Won Wron.
Cool Stores For Fruit Act 1914 (repealed)	5 Geo. V. No. 2543	26 October 1914
An Act to make provision for Cool Stores for Fruit and for other purposes. (Repealed by Fruit Act 1915 (6 Geo. V. No. 2657))
Charitable Trusts Act 1914	5 Geo. V. No. 2544	26 October 1914
An Act relating to Charitable Uses and Trusts.
	5 Geo. V. No. 2545	2 November 1914
An Act to apply out of the Consolidated Revenue the sum of One million three hundred and three thousand seven hundred and four pounds to the service of the year One thousand one hundred and fourteen and One thousand nine hundred and fifteen.
Mines Acts Amendment Act 1914 (repealed)	5 Geo. V. No. 2546	2 November 1914
An Act to further amend the Mines Acts as to the Yearly Rent payable in respect of Mineral Leases. (Repealed by Mines Act 1915 (6 Geo. V. No. 2698))
Lorquon to Yanac-a-Yanac Railway Construction Act 1914	5 Geo. V. No. 2547	2 November 1914
An Act to authorize the Construction by the State of a Line of Railway from Lorquon to Yanac-a-Yanac.
War Expenditure and Overdrafts Act 1914	5 Geo. V. No. 2548	2 November 1914
An Act to authorize and validate certain Expenditure by Municipalities and other Bodies in connexion with the present War and also certain Overdrafts by Municipalities.
Land Act 1901 Amendment Act 1914 (repealed)	5 Geo. V. No. 2549	2 November 1914
An Act to further amend the Land Act 1901 (Note: Land Act 1901 (1 Edw. VII. No. 1749)) and for other purposes. (Repealed by Land Act 1915 (6 Geo. V. No. 2676))
Railways Advances Act 1914 (No. 2)	5 Geo. V. No. 2550	2 November 1914
An Act to authorize the Temporary Application out of "The Public Account" of certain Moneys for the purpose of substituting Heavy Rails for Light Rails on certain Lines of Railway.
Melbourne Tramways Trust (No. 2) Act 1914	5 Geo. V. No. 2551	2 November 1914
An Act to amend the Melbourne Tramways Trust Act 1914. (Note: Melbourne Tramways Trust Act 1914 (4 Geo. V. No. 2494))
Transfer of Land Act 1890 Amendment Act 1914 (No. 2) (repealed)	5 Geo. V. No. 2552	2 November 1914
An Act to further amend the Transfer of Land Act 1890 (Note: Transfer of Land Act 1890 (54 Vict. No. 1149)) and for other purposes. (Repealed by Transfer of Land Act 1915 (6 Geo. V. No. 2740))
Savings Banks Acts Amendment Act 1914	5 Geo. V. No. 2553	2 November 1914
An Act relating to Investments by the Commissioners of the State Savings Bank of Victoria and to certain Kinds of Debentures held by them and for other purposes.
Prahran Mechanics' Institute Act 1914 (repealed)	5 Geo. V. No. 2554	2 November 1914
An Act to further amend the Prahran Mechanics' Institute Act 1899. (Note: Prahran Mechanics' Institute Act 1899 (63 Vict. No. 1617)) (Repealed by Statute Law Revision Act 1995 (No. 11 of 1995))
Thistle Act 1890 Amendment Act 1914 (repealed)	5 Geo. V. No. 2555	2 November 1914
An Act to further amend the Thistle Act 1890. (Note: Thistle Act 1890 (54 Vict. No. 1145)) (Repealed by Thistle Act 1915 (6 Geo. V. No. 2736))
Sandringham to Black Rock Electric Street Railway Act 1914	5 Geo. V. No. 2556	2 November 1914
An Act to authorize the Construction by the State of an Electric Street Railway from Sandringham to Black Rock.
Local Government Acts Amendment Act 1914 (repealed)	5 Geo. V. No. 2557	2 November 1914
An Act to further amend the Local Government Act 1903 (Note: Local Government Act 1903 (3 Edw. VII. No. 1893)) and for other purposes. (Repealed by Local Government Act 1915 (6 Geo. V. No. 2686))
Factories and Shops Acts Amendment Act 1914 (repealed)	5 Geo. V. No. 2558	2 November 1914
An Act to further amend the Factories and Shops Act 1912. (Note: Factories and Shops Act 1912 (3 Geo. V. No. 2386)) (Repealed by Factories and Shops Act 1915 (6 Geo. V. No. 2650))
St. Arnaud Market Land Act 1914	5 Geo. V. No. 2559	2 November 1914
An Act to revoke the Permanent Reservation of the remaining Portion of certain Land at St. Arnaud permanently reserved from Sale as a Site for a Market.
Warrnambool Land Act 1914	5 Geo. V. No. 2560	2 November 1914
An Act to provide for the Closing of Portion of a certain Street in the Town of Warrnambool and for other purposes.
Bendigo Creek Act 1914	5 Geo. V. No. 2561	2 November 1914
An Act to provide for the Cleaning Out and Reclamation of the Bendigo Creek and for other purposes.
Municipal Endowment Act 1914	5 Geo. V. No. 2562	30 December 1914
An Act relating to Municipal Endowment.
Treasury Bonds Act 1914	5 Geo. V. No. 2563	30 December 1914
An Act to authorize the Issue of Treasury Bonds.
Criminal Appeal Act 1914 (repealed)	5 Geo. V. No. 2564	30 December 1914
An Act to provide for Appeals in Criminal Cases and for other purposes. (Repealed by Crimes Act 1915 (6 Geo. V. No. 2637))
Administration and Probate Act 1914	5 Geo. V. No. 2565	30 December 1914
An Act relating to Duties payable under the Administration and Probate Acts and to amend the said Acts.
Land Tax Act 1914 (repealed)	5 Geo. V. No. 2566	30 December 1914
An Act to declare the Rate of Land Tax for the Year ending the thirty-first day of December One thousand nine hundred and fifteen and to amend the Land Tax Acts. (Repealed by Land Tax Act 1915 (6 Geo. V. No. 2680))
Coroners Act 1914 (repealed)	5 Geo. V. No. 2567	30 December 1914
An Act to amend the Coroners Act 1911. (Note: Coroners Act 1911 (2 Geo. V. No. 2343)) (Repealed by Coroners Act 1915 (6 Geo. V. No. 2634))
Seed Advances Act 1914	5 Geo. V. No. 2568	30 December 1914
An Act to enable Seed and Fodder to be advanced on certain terms to Cultivators of Land and for other purposes.
Hawkers and Pedlers Act 1914 (repealed)	5 Geo. V. No. 2569	30 December 1914
An Act to amend the Hawkers and Pedlers Act 1890. (Note: Hawkers and Pedlers Act 1890 (54 Vict. No. 1097)) (Repealed by Hawkers and Pedlers Act 1915 (6 Geo. V. No. 2664))
	5 Geo. V. No. 2570	30 December 1914
An Act to apply a sum out of the Consolidated Revenue to the service of the year ending on the thirtieth day of June One thousand nine hundred and fifteen and to appropriate the Supplies granted in this and the last preceding Session of Parliament.
Rating on Unimproved Values Act 1914 (No. 2) (repealed)	5 Geo. V. No. 2571	30 December 1914
An Act to amend Section Two and Section Four of the Rating on Unimproved Values Act 1914. (Note: Rating on Unimproved Values Act 1914 (4 Geo. V. No. 2478)) (Repealed by Rating on Unimproved Values Act 1915 (6 Geo. V. No. 2817))
Foodstuffs and Commodities Act 1914 Continuation Act 1914	5 Geo. V. No. 2572	30 December 1914
An Act to continue the Foodstuffs and Commodities Act 1914. (Note: Foodstuffs and Commodities Act 1914 (5 Geo. V. No. 2517))
Crowland and Navarre Railway Construction Trust (Indemnity) Act 1914	5 Geo. V. No. 2573	30 December 1914
An Act to indemnify the Members of the Crowland and Navarre Railway Construction Trust for not repaying Moneys obtained by Overdraft of Current Account in a certain Bank within two years of the Constitution of such Trust and for other purposes.
Instruments Act 1914	5 Geo. V. No. 2574	30 December 1914
An Act to amend Part VII. of the Instruments Act 1890. (Note: Instruments Act 1890 (54 Vict. No. 1103))
Stamps Act 1914 (repealed)	5 Geo. V. No. 2575	30 December 1914
An Act to further amend the Stamps Acts. (Repealed by Stamps Act 1915 (6 Geo. V. No. 2728))
Income Tax Act 1914	5 Geo. V. No. 2576	30 December 1914
An Act to declare the rates of Income Tax for each of the five Years ending on the thirty-first day of December One thousand nine hundred and nineteen and to amend and continue the Income Tax Acts.
Price of Goods Act 1914 (No. 2)	5 Geo. V. No. 2577	30 December 1914
An Act to amend and continue the Price of Goods Act 1914. (Note: Price of Goods Act 1914 (5 Geo. V. No. 2516))

== Sources ==
- "1914 Victorian Historical Acts". AustLII.
