= List of libraries in Melbourne =

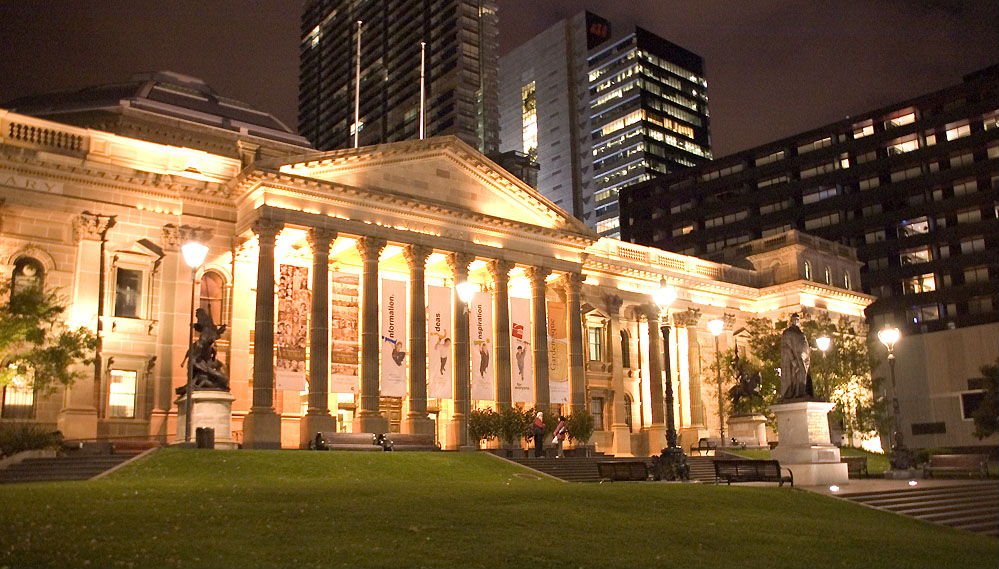
State Library Victoria

This is a list of libraries in Melbourne, Victoria, Australia, the second UNESCO City of Literature. Melbourne has a rich and varied reading culture and municipal councils throughout Melbourne provide funding and support for a large network of libraries.

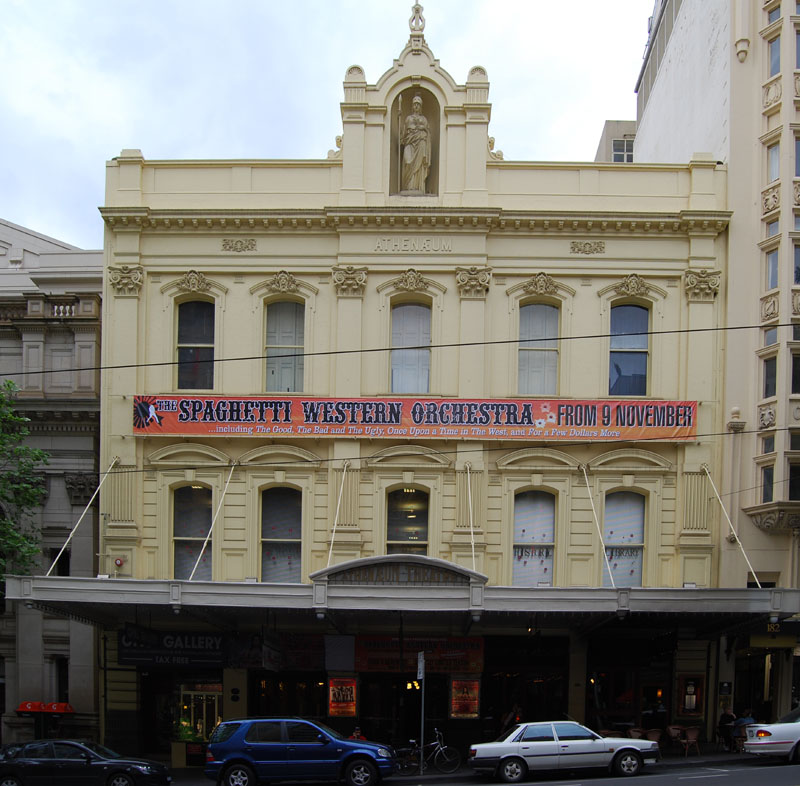
Melbourne Athenaeum

== Community and non-profit libraries ==
- Australian Queer Archives
- Berwick Mechanics' Institute
- Footscray Mechanics' Institute Inc. Library, Footscray
- Melbourne Athenaeum Library
- PMI Victorian History Library
- Melbourne Art Library
- The Military Library of the Royal United Services Institute of Victoria

== Public library services ==
Melbourne's public library services are operated by local government municipalities through a range of grants funding and service agreements. In addition to branch libraries a number of library service providers also operate a mobile service to outer Metropolitan areas. Public Libraries Victoria is the peak body for public libraries in Victoria.

Inner City

- City of Melbourne has libraries in Docklands, East Melbourne, Melbourne and North Melbourne.
- City of Port Phillip has libraries in Albert Park, Middle Park, Port Melbourne, South Melbourne and St Kilda.
- City of Yarra has libraries in Carlton North, Collingwood, Fitzroy, Fitzroy North and Richmond.

Northern suburbs

- City of Banyule has libraries in Ivanhoe, Rosanna and Watsonia and a click and collect service at Bellfield. Their libraries are operated by Yarra Plenty Regional Library.
- City of Darebin has libraries in Fairfield, Northcote, Preston and Reservoir.
- City of Hume has libraries in Broadmeadows, Craigieburn, Gladstone Park, Sunbury and Tullamarine.
- City of Moonee Valley has libraries in Ascot Vale, Avondale Heights, Flemington, Moonee Ponds and Niddrie.
- City of Merri-bek has libraries in Brunswick, Brunswick West, Coburg, Fawkner and Glenroy.
- Shire of Nillumbik has libraries in Eltham and Greensborough, and a click and collect service at Hurstbridge. Their libraries are operated by Yarra Plenty Regional Library.
- City of Whittlesea has libraries in Lalor, Mernda, Mill Park, Thomastown and Whittlesea, and a click and collect service at Epping. Their libraries are operated by Yarra Plenty Regional Library.

Eastern suburbs

- City of Boroondara has libraries in Ashburton, Balwyn, Balwyn North, Camberwell, Hawthorn and Kew.
- City of Knox has libraries in Boronia, Bayswater, Ferntree Gully, Rowville and Wantirna South. Their libraries are operated by Your Library.
- City of Manningham has libraries in Bulleen, Doncaster, Doncaster East and Warrandyte. Their libraries are operated by Whitehorse Manningham Libraries.
- City of Maroondah has libraries in Croydon and Ringwood. Their libraries are operated by Your Library.
- City of Whitehorse has libraries in Blackburn, Box Hill, Nunawading and Vermont South. Their libraries are operated by Whitehorse Manningham Libraries.
- Shire of Yarra Ranges has libraries in Belgrave, Healesville, Lilydale, Montrose, Mooroolbark, Mount Evelyn and Yarra Junction. Their libraries are operated by Your Library.

South Eastern suburbs

- City of Bayside has libraries in Beaumaris, Brighton, Hampton and Sandringham, and a library locker in Hurlingham Park
- Shire of Cardinia has libraries in Emerald and Pakenham. Their libraries are operated by Myli - My Community Library.
- City of Casey has libraries in Cranbourne, Doveton, Endeavour Hills, Hampton Park and Narre Warren.
- City of Greater Dandenong has libraries in Dandenong and Springvale, and a library locker in Dandenong North.
- City of Frankston has libraries in Carrum Downs, Frankston and Seaford.
- City of Glen Eira has libraries in Bentleigh, Carnegie, Caulfield and Elsternwick.
- City of Kingston has libraries in Chelsea, Cheltenham, Clarinda, Clayton South, Dingley Village, Highett, Moorabbin, Parkdale and Patterson Lakes.
- City of Monash has libraries in Clayton, Glen Waverley, Mount Waverley, Mulgrave, Oakleigh and Wheelers Hill
- Shire of Mornington Peninsula has libraries in Hastings, Mornington, Rosebud, Somerville and Sorrento.
- City of Stonnington has libraries in Malvern, Malvern East, Prahran and South Yarra.

Western suburbs

- City of Brimbank has libraries in Deer Park, Keilor, St Albans, Sunshine and Sydenham.
- City of Hobsons Bay has libraries in Altona, Altona Meadows, Altona North, Newport and Williamstown.
- City of Maribyrnong has libraries in Braybrook, Footscray, Maribyrnong, West Footscray and Yarraville, and a library locker in Maribyrnong Aquatic Centre.
- Shire of Melton has libraries in Caroline Springs and Melton, and library access points in Aintree, Diggers Rest, Fraser Rise and Strathtulloh.
- City of Wyndham has libraries in Hoppers Crossing, Manor Lakes, Point Cook, Tarneit, Truganina, Werribee and Williams Landing.

== State Government libraries ==
The State Government of Victoria maintains a library service for staff within Government departments and agencies through the Victorian Government Library Service, and to all Victorians through the State collection maintained by State Library Victoria.

- Museums Victoria library

== Theological libraries ==
The multi-campus, national University of Divinity has 10 libraries in Victoria.

- The Carmelite Library, Middle Park
- Dalton McCaughey Library, Parkville
- Eva Burrows Library, The Salvation Army, Ringwood
- Geoffrey Blackburn Library, Whitley College, Parkville
- Leeper and Mollison Libraries, Parkville
- Mannix Library, Catholic Theological College, East Melbourne
- Redemptorist Seminary Library, Kew
- Social Justice Library, Box Hill
- St Athanasius College Library, Coptic Orthodox Church, Donvale
- St Paschal Library, Box Hill

== University residential college libraries ==
- Ormond College Library, The University of Melbourne
- Trinity College Library, The University of Melbourne

== University libraries ==
- The University of Melbourne has libraries on its campuses in:
  - Parkville: ABP Library, Baillieu Library, ERC Library, Giblin Eunson Library, Law Library
  - Burnley: Burnley Library Creswick: Creswick Library
  - Dookie: Dookie Library
  - Southbank: Southbank Library
  - Werribee: J.A. Gilruth Library
- La Trobe University has libraries in Albury–Wodonga, Bendigo, Bundoora, Melbourne, Mildura, Shepparton, Sydney
- RMIT University Library
- Monash University Library
- Swinburne University of Technology Library
- Victoria University Library
- Deakin University Library
- Federation University Library

== Special libraries ==
There are a large number of special libraries in Melbourne, which are embedded in corporations and organisations in the fields of law, business, professional associations, health, charitable, religious and cultural organisations.

== Library sponsors, donors and foundations ==
- State Library Victoria Foundation
