= List of acts of the Parliament of Victoria from 1899 =

This is a list of acts of the Parliament of Victoria, Australia for the year 1899.

== 1899 ==
Short title, or popular name	Citation	Royal assent
Long title
Commonwealth of Australia Constitution Act 1900	63 Vict. No. 1603 (Note: Although the Commonwealth of Australia Constitution Act 1900 was eventually passed the following year, the act was entered on the Victorian statute roll with this number.)	
An Act to Constitute the Commonwealth of Australia.
	63 Vict. No. 1604	12 July 1899
An Act to apply out of the Consolidated Revenue the sum of Five hundred and eighty-four thousand nine hundred and ninety-seven pounds to the service of the year One thousand eight hundred and ninety-nine and One thousand nine hundred.
Railway Lands Acquisition Act 1899 (repealed)	63 Vict. No. 1605	17 July 1899
An Act to amend the Railway Lands Acquisition Acts. (Repealed by Railway Lands Acquisition Act 1915 (6 Geo. V. No. 2715))
Constitution Act Amendment Act 1899	63 Vict. No. 1606	30 August 1899
An Act to abolish Plural Voting in the Elections of Members of the Legislative Assembly.
Kerang Agricultural Show Yards Sale Act 1899	63 Vict. No. 1607	30 August 1899
An Act to provide for the Sale of the Show Yards at Kerang.
Reformed Presbyterian Church of Ireland Act 1899 (repealed)	63 Vict. No. 1608	30 August 1899
An Act relating to the Reformed Presbyterian Church of Ireland at Geelong. (Repealed by Statute Law Revision Act 1995 (No. 11 of 1995))
Moorpanyal Land Act 1899	63 Vict. No. 1609	30 August 1899
An Act to amend the Moorpanyal Land Act 1897. (Note: Moorpanyal Land Act 1897 (61 Vict. No. 1507))
Ararat Land Act 1899 (repealed)	63 Vict. No. 1610	30 August 1899
An Act to provide for the Resumption by the Crown of certain Land in the parish of Ararat. (Repealed by Statute Law Revision Act 1984 (No. 10087))
Evidence Act 1899 (repealed)	63 Vict. No. 1611	30 August 1899
An Act to amend the Law of Evidence with regard to the Office of Deputy Registrar-General. (Repealed by Evidence Act 1915 (6 Geo. V. No. 2647))
	63 Vict. No. 1612	30 August 1899
An Act to apply out of the Consolidated Revenue the sum of One hundred and sixty-seven thousand seven hundred and sixty-six pounds to the service of the year One thousand eight hundred and ninety-eight and ninety-nine.
	63 Vict. No. 1613	30 August 1899
An Act to apply out of the Consolidated Revenue the sum of One million one hundred and seventy-eight thousand five hundred and thirty-one pounds to the service of the year One thousand eight hundred and ninety-nine and One thousand nine hundred.
Geelong Mechanics' Institute Act 1899	63 Vict. No. 1614	18 September 1899
An Act for the Incorporation of the Mechanics' Institute at Geelong and for other purposes.
Vermin Destruction Act 1899 (repealed)	63 Vict. No. 1615	18 September 1899
An Act to amend the Vermin Destruction Act 1890. (Note: Vermin Destruction Act 1890 (54 Vict. No. 1153)) (Repealed by Vermin Destruction Act 1915 (6 Geo. V. No. 2745))
Local Government Act 1899 No. 1 (repealed)	63 Vict. No. 1616	16 October 1899
An Act to further amend the Local Government Act 1890. (Note: Local Government Act 1890 (54 Vict. No. 1112)) (Repealed by Local Government Act 1903 (3 Edw. VII. No. 1893))
Prahran Mechanics' Institute Act 1899 (repealed)	63 Vict. No. 1617	27 October 1899
An Act to provide for the Incorporation and Government of the Prahran Mechanics' Institute. (Repealed by Prahran Mechanics' Institute Repeal Act 2024 (No. 30 of 2024))
Romsey Park Act 1899	63 Vict. No. 1618	27 October 1899
An Act to provide for the resumption by the Crown of a portion of the Romsey Public Park.
Victorian Military Contingent Act 1899	63 Vict. No. 1619	27 October 1899
An Act to provide for the government discipline and maintenance of a Victorian Contingent for service with Her Majesty's Regular Forces in South Africa.
Pilots' Advance Repayment Act 1899 (repealed)	63 Vict. No. 1620	27 November 1899
An Act to amend the Pilots' Advance Repayment Act 1898. (Note: Pilots' Advance Repayment Act 1898 (62 Vict. No. 1569)) (Repealed by Statute Law Revision Act 1995 (No. 11 of 1995))
Railway and Public Works Loan Application Act 1899	63 Vict. No. 1621	27 November 1899
An Act to further amend the Railway and Public Works Loan Application Act 1898. (Note: Railway and Public Works Loan Application Act 1898 (62 Vict. No. 1566))
Surplus Revenue Act 1899	63 Vict. No. 1622	27 November 1899
An Act relating to the Surplus Revenue of the Financial Year ended on the thirtieth day of June One thousand eight hundred and ninety-nine.
Victorian Government Three Per Cent Stock Act 1899 (repealed)	63 Vict. No. 1623	27 November 1899
An Act to authorize the raising of Money for certain purposes by increasing the amount of Victorian Government Three per cent. Stock. (Repealed by Treasury Legislation (Repeal) Act 2005 (No. 73 of 2005))
	63 Vict. No. 1624	30 November 1899
An Act to apply out of the Consolidated Revenue the sum of Three hundred and ninety-one thousand seven hundred and eighty-eight pounds to the service of the year One thousand eight hundred and ninety-nine and One thousand nine hundred.
Water Supply Advances Relief Act 1899	63 Vict. No. 1625	7 December 1899
An Act to relieve certain Corporations of a part of their indebtedness for moneys borrowed from the State for Water Supply.
	63 Vict. No. 1626	15 December 1899
An Act to apply out of the Consolidated Revenue the sum of Three hundred and seventy-six thousand six hundred and fifty-nine pounds to the service of the year One thousand eight hundred and ninety-nine and One thousand nine hundred.

== Sources ==
- "1899 Victorian Historical Acts". AustLII.
