= List of acts of the Parliament of Victoria from 1984 =

This is a list of acts of the Parliament of Victoria, Australia for the year 1984.

== 1984 ==
Short title, or popular name	Citation	Royal assent
Long title
Criminal Proceedings Act 1984	No. 10030	27 March 1984
An Act to make special provisions with respect to certain criminal proceedings and for other purposes.
Medical Practitioners (Private Hospitals) Act 1984	No. 10032	3 April 1984
An Act to amend the Medical Practitioners Act 1970, (Note: Medical Practitioners Act 1970 (No. 8061)) to make provision with respect to Private Hospitals in which a Medical Practitioner has a Notifiable Interest, to amend the Health Act 1958, (Note: Health Act 1958 (No. 6270)) and for other purposes.
Melbourne Cricket Ground Act 1984	No. 10039	18 April 1984
An Act to facilitate the construction of floodlight towers and the operation of floodlights at the ground known as the Melbourne Cricket Ground, to amend the Melbourne Cricket Ground Act 1933, (Note: Melbourne Cricket Ground Act 1933 (No. 4149)) and for other purposes.
Public Service (Amendment) Act 1984 (repealed)	No. 10046	1 May 1984
An Act to amend the Public Service Act 1974 (Note: Public Service Act 1974 (No. 8658)) and for other purposes. (Repealed by Statute Law Revision (Repeals) Act 1999 (No. 3 of 1999))
Water and Sewerage Authorities (Further Restructuring) Act 1984	No. 10048	8 May 1984
An Act to amend the Geelong Waterworks and Sewerage Act 1958, (Note: Geelong Waterworks and Sewerage Act 1958 (No. 6263)) the Mildura Irrigation and Water Trusts Act 1958, (Note: Mildura Irrigation and Water Trusts Act 1958 (No. 6316)) the Water Act 1958 (Note: Water Act 1958 (No. 6413)) and the Water and Sewerage Authorities (Restructuring) Act 1983 (Note: Water and Sewerage Authorities (Restructuring) Act 1983 (No. 9895)) for the purpose of further restructuring Victoria's Urban Water and Sewerage Authorities, to consequentially amend certain other Acts, and for other purposes.
Water (Amendment) Act 1984	No. 10060	8 May 1984
An Act to amend the Water Act 1958 to make provision for an alternative system of charging for water supplied to rural districts and to reduce the interest-free period for payment of charges for water and for other purposes.
Teaching Service (Amendment) Act 1984	No. 10065	15 May 1984
An Act to amend the Teaching Service Act 1981, (Note: Education Service Act 1981 (No. 9714)) the (Note: Education Service (Amendment) Act 1982 (No. 9788)) and the Teaching Service Act 1983, (Note: Teaching Service Act 1983 (No. 10029)) to provide for interim Teaching Service Appeals Boards for the purposes of the Teaching Service Act 1981, and for other purposes.
Groundwater (Reserves) Act 1984	No. 10066	15 May 1984
An Act to amend the Groundwater Act 1969 (Note: Groundwater Act 1969 (No. 7849)) to provide for the reservation of groundwater resources for future public use and for other purposes.
Victorian Public Authorities Finance Act 1984	No. 10068	15 May 1984
An Act to establish a Victorian Public Authorities Finance Agency to provide financial services for certain Public Authorities in Victoria and for other purposes.
Prahran Mechanics' Institute Act 1984 (repealed)	No. 10071	15 May 1984
An Act to make provision with respect to the Prahran Mechanics' Institution and Circulating Library Incorporated, to amend the Prahran Mechanics' Institute Act 1899 (Note: Prahran Mechanics' Institute Act 1899 (63 Vict. No. 1617)) and for other purposes. (Repealed by Statute Law Revision Act 1995 (No. 11 of 1995))
Medical Practitioners (Miscellaneous Amendments) Act 1984 (repealed)	No. 10072	15 May 1984
An Act to amend the Medical Practitioners Act 1970, and for other purposes. (Repealed by Statute Law Revision (Repeals) Act 1999 (No. 3 of 1999))
Magistrates' Courts (Jurisdiction) Act 1984 (repealed)	No. 10077	15 May 1984
An Act to amend the law relating to the jurisdiction of justices, the jurisdiction of magistrates' courts and the procedure in magistrates' courts in relation to certain offences, to amend the Magistrates' Courts Act 1971, (Note: Magistrates' Courts Act 1971 (No. 8184)) the Coroners Act 1958 (Note: Coroners Act 1958 (No. 6227)) and the Magistrates (Summary Proceedings) Act 1975 (Note: Magistrates (Summary Proceedings) Act 1975 (No. 8731)) and for other purposes. (Repealed by Statute Law Revision Act 1995 (No. 11 of 1995))
Crimes (Conspiracy and Incitement) Act 1984 (repealed)	No. 10079	15 May 1984
An Act to amend and codify the law relating to conspiracy and incitement, to amend the Crimes Act 1958, (Note: Crimes Act 1958 (No. 6231)) and for other purposes. (Repealed by Statute Law Revision Act 2013 (No. 70 of 2013)
Water (Central Management Restructuring) Act 1984	No. 10081	15 May 1984
An Act to abolish the State Rivers and Water Supply Commission and the Water Resources Council, to establish a Rural Water Commission of Victoria, to make provision with respect to the powers of the Minister for Water Resources, to incorporate the Director-General of Water Resources, to amend the Water Act 1958, to repeal the Water Resources Act 1975 (Note: Water Resources Act 1975 (No. 8729)) and the Water (Delegation of Powers) Act 1983, (Note: Water (Delegation of Powers) Act 1983 (No. 9994)) to make consequential amendments to various Acts and for other purposes.
Food Act 1984	No. 10082	15 May 1984
An Act to consolidate and amend the Law relating to the Preparation and Sale of Food, to make Provision for securing the Wholesomeness and Purity of and fixing Standards for Food, to prevent false or misleading packaging and labelling of Food and false or misleading advertising in connexion with Food, to amend the Health Act 1958, the Magistrates (Summary Proceedings) Act 1975 and the Health Commission Act 1977 (Note: Health Commission Act 1977 (No. 9023)) and for other purposes.
Pathology Services Accreditation Act 1984	No. 10083	22 May 1984
An Act to establish the Pathology Services Accreditation Board, to provide for the accreditation of pathology services and for other purposes.
Statute Law Revision Act 1984 (repealed)	No. 10087	22 May 1984
An Act to revise the Statute Law of Victoria. (Repealed by Statute Law Revision Act 1995 (No. 11 of 1995))
Supply (1984-85, No. 1) Act 1984 (repealed)	No. 10088	22 May 1984
An Act to make interim provision for the Appropriation of Moneys out of the Consolidated Fund for the Recurrent Services and for certain Works and Purposes for the Financial Year 1984—85. (Repealed by Statute Law Revision Act 1995 (No. 11 of 1995))
State Insurance Office Act 1984 (repealed)	No. 10089	22 May 1984
An Act to establish the State Insurance Office as a body corporate under the Management and Control of a Board of Management, to provide for Insurance Business to be undertaken by the State Insurance Office, to repeal the State Insurance Office Act 1975 (Note: State Insurance Office Act 1975 (No. 8727)) and for other purposes. (Repealed by Treasury Legislation (Repeal) Act 2005 (No. 73 of 2005))
Credit (Administration) Act 1984	No. 10091	22 May 1984
An Act relating to the Administration of the Credit Act 1984, (Note: Credit Act 1984 (No. 10097)) to make Provision for the Licensing of certain Persons, for Tribunals and for other matters and for other purposes.
Planning (Brothels) Act 1984 (repealed)	No. 10094	22 May 1984
An Act to amend the Town and Country Planning Act 1961, (Note: Town and Country Planning Act 1961 (No. 6849)) the Crimes Act 1958, the Vagrancy Act 1966, (Note: Vagrancy Act 1966 (No. 7393)) and the Summary Offences Act 1966 (Note: Summary Offences Act 1966 (No. 7405)) with respect to brothels and for other purposes. (Repealed by Statute Law Revision (Repeals) Act 1999 (No. 3 of 1999))
Equal Opportunity Act 1984 (repealed)	No. 10095	22 May 1984
An Act to render unlawful certain Kinds of Discrimination, to promote Equality of Opportunity between persons of different status, to amend the Companies (Consequential Amendments) Act 1981, (Note: Companies (Consequential Amendments) Act 1981 (No. 9699)) to repeal the Equal Opportunity Act 1977 (Note: Equal Opportunity Act 1977 (No. 9025)) and the Equal Opportunity (Discrimination Against Disabled Persons) Act 1982 (Note: Equal Opportunity (Discrimination Against Disabled Persons) Act 1982 (No. 9843)) and for other purposes. (Repealed by Equal Opportunity Act 1995 (No. 42 of 1995))
Interpretation of Legislation Act 1984	No. 10096	22 May 1984
An Act to make fresh provision with respect to the construction and operation of, and the shortening of the language used in, Acts of Parliament and subordinate instruments, to repeal the Acts Interpretation Act 1958, (Note: Acts Interpretation Act 1958 (No. 6189)) to amend the Property Law Act 1958, (Note: Property Law Act 1958 (No. 6344)) the Supreme Court Act 1958, (Note: Supreme Court Act 1958 (No. 6387)) the Subordinate Legislation Act 1962, (Note: Subordinate Legislation Act 1962 (No. 6886)) the Constitution Act 1975, (Note: Constitution Act 1975 (No. 8750)) the Penalties and Sentences Act 1981 (Note: Penalties and Sentences Act 1981 (No. 9554)) and certain other Acts and for other purposes.
Credit Act 1984	No. 10097	22 May 1984
An Act relating to the provision of credit and the regulation of contracts providing credit and of matters connected with the provision of credit, to repeal the Money Lenders Act 1958 (Note: Money Lenders Act 1958 (No. 6324)) and the Credit Act 1981, (Note: Credit Act 1981 (No. 9668)) to amend the Hire-Purchase Act 1959, (Note: Hire-Purchase Act 1959 (No. 6531)) the Chattel Securities Act 1981 (Note: Chattel Securities Act 1981 (No. 9650)) and certain other Acts and for other purposes.
Liquor Control (Booth Licences) Act 1984 (repealed)	No. 10098	7 September 1984
An Act to amend the Liquor Control Act 1968 (Note: Liquor Control Act 1968 (No. 7695)) with respect to Booth Licences, and for other purposes. (Repealed by Statute Law Revision Act 1995 (No. 11 of 1995))
Magistrates' Courts (Appointment of Magistrates) Act 1984 (repealed)	No. 10101	11 September 1983
An Act to make further provision with respect to the appointment and tenure of Stipendiary Magistrates and for other purposes. (Repealed by Statute Law Revision (Repeals) Act 1999 (No. 3 of 1999))
Constitution (Duration of Parliament) Act 1984	No. 10106	25 September 1984
An Act to amend the Constitution Act 1975 and The Constitution Act Amendment Act 1958 (Note: Constitution Act Amendment Act 1958 (No. 6224)) with respect to the Duration of the Legislative Assembly, the Tenure of Members of the Legislative Council and the Dissolution of the Legislative Assembly and for other purposes.
Monash University (Amendment) Act 1984 (repealed)	No. 10109	25 September 1984
An Act to amend generally the Monash University Act 1958. (Note: Monash University Act 1958 (No. 6184)) (Repealed by Statute Law Revision Act 1995 (No. 11 of 1995))
Deakin University (Amendment) Act 1984 (repealed)	No. 10110	25 September 1984
An Act to amend generally the Deakin University Act 1974. (Note: Deakin University Act 1974 (No. 8610)) (Repealed by Statute Law Revision Act 1995 (No. 11 of 1995))
Water Charge Concessions Act 1984	No. 10119	7 November 1984
An Act to provide concessions to certain persons in relation to the supply of water, to amend the Water Act 1958, the Geelong Waterworks and Sewerage Act 1958, the Mildura Irrigation Trusts and Sunraysia Water Board Act 1958 (Note: Mildura Irrigation and Water Trusts Act 1958 (No. 6316)) and the Melbourne and Metropolitan Board of Works Act 1958 (Note: Melbourne and Metropolitan Board of Works Act 1958 (No. 6310)) and for other purposes.
Firearms (General Amendment) Act 1984 (repealed)	No. 10124	7 November 1984
An Act to amend the Firearms Act 1958 (Note: Firearms Act 1958 (No. 6251)) with respect to the recognition of interstate licences, the grant of display licences and exemptions from the operation of the Act, to provide greater controls over firearms and licence-holders and for other purposes. (Repealed by Statute Law Revision Act 1995 (No. 11 of 1995))
Constitution (Council Vacancies) Act 1984	No. 10125	7 November 1984
An Act to provide for the filling of places of members of the Legislative Council for the provinces named Ballarat, Boronia, Monash or Western whose seats fall vacant in certain circumstances and for other purposes.
Liquor Control (Amendment) Act 1984 (repealed)	No. 10130	7 November 1984
An Act to amend the Liquor Control Act 1968 and the Liquor Control Act 1983, (Note: Liquor Control Act 1983 (No. 9931)) and for other purposes. (Repealed by Statute Law Revision (Repeals) Act 1999 (No. 3 of 1999))
Law Reform Commission Act 1984	No. 10131	13 November 1984
An Act to establish the Law Reform Commission of Victoria and define its functions, to repeal the Law Reform Act 1973 (Note: Law Reform Act 1973 (No. 8483)) and the Law Reform Act 1981, (Note: Law Reform Act 1981 (No. 9634)) to amend the Victoria Law Foundation Act 1978 (Note: Victoria Law Foundation Act 1978 (No. 9174)) and for other purposes.
Medical Practitioners (Further Amendment) Act 1984 (repealed)	No. 10132	13 November 1984
An Act to amend the Medical Practitioners Act 1970, and for other purposes. (Repealed by Statute Law Revision Act 1995 (No. 11 of 1995))
Racing (Amendment) Act 1984	No. 10133	13 November 1984
An Act to amend the Racing (Amendment) Act 1983. (Note: Racing (Amendment) Act 1983 (No. 9924))
Pre-school Teachers and Assistants (Portability of Long Service Leave) Act 1984	No. 10135	13 November 1984
An Act to make provision in relation to portability of long service leave for certain pre-school teachers and assistants and for other purposes.
Fundraising Appeals Act 1984	No. 10138	13 November 1984
An Act to regulate and control the raising and application of money and other benefits from the public, to amend the Hospitals and Charities Act 1958 (Note: Hospitals and Charities Act 1958 (No. 6274)) and for other purposes.
State Electricity Commission (Coal Corporation of Victoria) Act 1984	No. 10145	13 November 1984
An Act to establish a Coal Corporation of Victoria, to abolish the Victorian Brown Coal Council, to amend the State Electricity Commission Act 1958 (Note: State Electricity Commission Act 1958 (No. 6377)) and the Electric Light and Power Act 1958, (Note: Electric Light and Power Act 1958 (No. 6241)) to repeal the Victorian Brown Coal Council Act 1978 (Note: Victorian Brown Coal Council Act 1978 (No. 9249)) and for other purposes.
Constitution Act Amendment (Electoral Legislation) Act 1984 (repealed)	No. 10146	13 November 1984
An Act to amend The Constitution Act Amendment Act 1958 with respect to the qualification and enrolment of electors, the conduct of ejections and the registration of political parties and candidates, to amend the Constitution Act 1975 and the Magistrates' Courts Act 1971 and for other purposes. (Repealed by Legislation Reform (Repeals No. 2) Act 2008 (No. 16 of 2008))
Education (Amendment) Act 1984 (repealed)	No. 10148	13 November 1984
An Act to amend the Education (Amendment) Act 1983 (Note: Education (Amendment) Act 1983 (No. 9993)) by repealing or amending in section 11 of that Act sub-sections (2) to (19), and to amend the Education Act 1958. (Note: Education Act 1958 (No. 6240)) (Repealed by Legislation Reform (Repeals No. 2) Act 2008 (No. 16 of 2008))
Fire Authorities Act 1984 (repealed)	No. 10149	13 November 1984
An Act to amend the Country Fire Authority Act 1958, (Note: Country Fire Authority Act 1958 (No. 6228)) the Country Fire Authority (Amendment) Act 1983 (Note: Country Fire Authority (Amendment) Act 1983 (No. 10004)) and the Metropolitan Fire Brigades Act 1958, (Note: Metropolitan Fire Brigades Act 1958 (No. 6315)) and for other purposes. (Repealed by Statute Law Revision Act 1995 (No. 11 of 1995))
Adoption Act 1984	No. 10150	13 November 1984
An Act to amend and re-enact the Law relating to Adoption, to repeal the Adoption of Children Act 1964, (Note: Adoption of Children Act 1964 (No. 7147)) to make consequential amendments to certain Acts and for other purposes.
Appropriation (1984-85, No. 1) Act 1984 (repealed)	No. 10151	13 November 1984
An Act to appropriate certain sums out of the Consolidated Fund for recurrent services and for certain works and purposes for the financial year 1984-85 and to appropriate the supplies granted in this session of Parliament and for other purposes. (Repealed by Statute Law Revision Act 1995 (No. 11 of 1995))
South Yarra Project Act 1984	No. 10153	20 November 1984
An Act to ratify, validate, approve and otherwise give effect to an Agreement between the Premier for and on behalf of the State of Victoria, The South Yarra Project Pty Ltd and the Mayor, Councillors and citizens of the City of Prahran with respect to the development of land at South Yarra in the State of Victoria, to make provision for certain matters in relation to that development and for other purposes.
Water (Miscellaneous Amendments) Act 1984 (repealed)	No. 10154	20 November 1984
An Act to amend the Mildura Irrigation Trusts and Sunraysia Water Board Act 1958, the Sewerage Districts Act 1958 (Note: Sewerage Districts Act 1958 (No. 6368)) and the Water Act 1958 and for other purposes. (Repealed by Statute Law Revision (Repeals) Act 1999 (No. 3 of 1999))
Administrative Appeals Tribunal Act 1984 (repealed)	No. 10155	20 November 1984
An Act to establish an Administrative Appeals Tribunal; to provide for review of certain decisions and for that purpose to amend the Freedom of Information Act 1982, (Note: Freedom of Information Act 1982 (No. 9859)) the Motor Accidents Act 1973, (Note: Motor Accidents Act 1973 (No. 8429)) the Estate Agents Act 1980, (Note: Estate Agents Act 1980 (No. 9428)) the Criminal Injuries Compensation Act 1983, (Note: Criminal Injuries Compensation Act 1983 (No. 9992)) the Adoption Act 1984, (Note: Adoption Act 1984 (No. 10150)) the State Employees Retirement Benefits Act 1979 (Note: State Employees Retirement Benefits Act 1979 (No. 9363)) and certain Acts relating to taxation, to repeal the Taxation Appeals Act 1972 (Note: Taxation Appeals Act 1972 (No. 8274)) and for other purposes. (Repealed by Tribunals and Licensing Authorities (Miscellaneous Amendments) Act 1998 (No. 52 of 1998))
National Crime Authority (State Provisions) Act 1984	No. 10157	20 November 1984
An Act to make provision for the operation of the National Crime Authority in Victoria and for other purposes.
Dangerous Goods (Road Transport) Act 1984 (repealed)	No. 10159	20 November 1984
An Act to promote the safety of persons and property in relation to the transport by road of dangerous goods, to provide for the giving of effect to certain provisions of the Australian Code for the Transport of Dangerous Goods by Road and Rail, to amend the Health Act 1958, the Explosives Act 1960, (Note: Explosives Act 1960 (No. 6715)) the Inflammable Liquids Act 1966, (Note: Inflammable Liquids Act 1966 (No. 7512)) the Liquefied Gases Act 1968 (Note: Liquefied Gases Act 1968 (No. 7754)) and the Transport Act 1983 (Note: Transport Act 1983 (No. 9921)) and for other purpose. (Repealed by Dangerous Goods Act 1985 (No. 10189))
Wheat Marketing Act 1984	No. 10162	20 November 1984
An Act relating to the marketing of wheat, to repeal the Wheat Marketing Act 1979 (Note: Wheat Marketing Act 1979 (No. 9362)) and certain other Acts, and for other purposes.
Infertility (Medical Procedures) Act 1984	No. 10163	20 November 1984
An Act relating to the regulation of certain procedures for the alleviation of infertility or to assist conception, to amend the Human Tissue Act 1982 (Note: Human Tissue Act 1982 (No. 9860)) and the Freedom of Information Act 1982, to prohibit agreements relating to surrogate motherhood and for other purposes.
Chinatown Historic Precinct Act 1984 (repealed)	No. 10165	20 November 1984
An Act to provide for the operation management development and promotion of Little Bourke Street between Exhibition Street and Swanston Street as the Chinatown Historic Precinct, to establish the Chinatown Historic Precinct Committee, to amend the Melbourne (Widening of Streets) Act 1940, (Note: Melbourne (Widening of Streets) Act 1940 (No. 4760)) and for other purposes. (Repealed by Statute Law Revision Act 2013 (No. 70 of 2013)
Commercial Arbitration Act 1984	No. 10167	20 November 1984
An Act to make provision with respect to the arbitration of certain disputes, to repeal the Arbitration Act 1958, (Note: Arbitration Act 1958 (No. 6200)) to amend the Legal Profession Practice Act 1958 (Note: Legal Profession Practice Act 1958 (No. 6291)) and the Supreme Court Act 1958, to make certain consequential amendments to various other Acts and for other purposes.
Trustee Companies Act 1984	No. 10168	20 November 1984
An Act, to re-enact with amendments the law relating to trustee companies, to repeal the Trustee Companies Act 1958 (Note: Trustee Companies Act 1958 (No. 6402)) and for other purposes.
Films (Classification) Act 1984	No. 10170	29 November 1984
An Act to provide for the sale of films of different classifications, to prohibit the sale of objectionable films and unclassified video films, to amend the Films Act 1971 (Note: Films Act 1971 (No. 8161)) and the Police Offences Act 1958, (Note: Police Offences Act 1958 (No. 6337)) and for other purposes.
Dairy Industry Act 1984	No. 10171	29 November 1984
An Act to re-enact with amendments the Law relating to the Victorian Dairy Industry, to repeal the Filled Milk Act 1958, (Note: Filled Milk Act 1958 (No. 6468)) the Milk and Dairy Supervision Act 1958, (Note: Milk and Dairy Supervision Act 1958 (No. 6317)) the Milk Board Act 1958, (Note: Milk Board Act 1958 (No. 6318)) the Milk Pasteurization Act 1958, (Note: Milk Pasteurization Act 1958 (No. 6319)) the Imitation Milk Act 1969, (Note: Imitation Milk Act 1969 (No. 7845)) the Victorian Dairy Industry Authority Act 1977, (Note: Victorian Dairy Industry Authority Act 1977 (No. 9004)) the Dairy Products (Repeal) Act 1978 (Note: Dairy Products (Repeal) Act 1978 (No. 9085)) and for other purposes.
Albury-Wodonga Agreement (Covenants) Act 1984	No.	
Alcoa (Portland Aluminium Smelter) (Amendment) Act 1984	No.	
Annual Reporting (Amendment) Act 1984	No.	
Archaeological and Aboriginal Relics Preservation (Amendment) Act 1984	No.	
Audit (Amendment) Act 1984	No.	
Building Control (Amendment) Act 1984	No.	
Canned Fruits Marketing (Amendment) Act 1984	No.	
Children (Guardianship and Custody) Act 1984	No.	
Co-operation (Amendment) Act 1984	No.	
Country Fire Authority (Borrowing Powers) Act 1984	No.	
County Court (Amendment) Act 1984	No.	
Crimes (Criminal Investigations) Act 1984	No.	
Crimes (General Amendment) Act 1984	No.	
Crown Land (Reserves) (Amendment) Act 1984	No.	
Drainage of Land (Amendment) Act 1984	No.	
Environment Protection (General Amendment) Act 1984	No.	
Environment Protection (Review) Act 1984	No.	
Environment Protection (Unleaded Petrol) Act 1984	No.	
Ethnic Affairs Commission (Amendment) Act 1984	No.	
Evidence (Amendment) Act 1984	No.	
Exhibition (Borrowing Power) Act 1984	No.	
Extractive Industries (Amendment) Act 1984	No.	
Extractive Industries (Renewal of Leases and Licences) Act 1984	No.	
Firearms (Amendment) Act 1984	No.	
Fisheries (Abalone Licences) Act 1984	No.	
Fisheries (Reciprocal Licences) Act 1984	No.	
Forests (Wood Pulp Agreement) Act 1984	No.	
Gas and Fuel Corporation (Borrowing Powers) Act 1984	No.	
Grain Handling Improvement Authorities (Abolition) Act 1984	No.	
Health (General Amendment) Act 1984	No.	
Health (Radiation Safety) Act 1984	No.	
Industrial Relations (Amendment) Act 1984	No.	
Industrial Relations (Long Service Leave) Act 1984	No.	
Judgment Debt Recovery Act 1984	No.	
Land (Miscellaneous Matters) Act 1984	No.	
Land Tax (Amendment) Act 1984	No.	
Land Tax (Landata Project) Act 1984	No.	
Lands (Miscellaneous Matters) Act 1984	No.	
Local Government (Long Service Leave) Act 1984	No.	
Lotteries Gaming and Betting (Amendment) Act 1984	No.	
Lotteries Gaming and Betting (Gaming Machines) Act 1984	No.	
Market Court (Amendment) Act 1984	No.	
Melbourne Corporation (Election of Council) (Amendment) Act 1984	No.	
Melbourne Cricket Ground (Guarantees) Act 1984	No.	
Metropolitan Fire Brigades (Amendment) Act 1984	No.	
Motor Car (Amendment) Act 1984	No.	
Motor Car (Insurance Surcharge) Act 1984	No.	
Motor Car (Licences) Act 1984	No.	
National Parks (Amendment) Act 1984	No.	
National Parks (Further Amendment) Act 1984	No.	
Pay-roll Tax (Amendment) Act 1984	No.	
Penalties and Sentences (Amendment) Act 1984	No.	
Penalties and Sentences (Youth Attendance Projects) Act 1984	No.	
Pensioner Concessions (Rehabilitation Allowance) Act 1984	No.	
Pipelines (Permits) Act 1984	No.	
Police Regulation (Amendment) Act 1984	No.	
Port Bellarine Tourist Resort (Amendment) Act 1984	No.	
Post-Secondary Education (Miscellaneous Amendments) Act 1984	No.	
Post-Secondary Education (Practical Placements) Act 1984	No.	
Professional Boxing Control (Suspension of Registration) Act 1984	No.	
Public Account (Amendment) Act 1984	No.	
Public Lands and Works (Amendment) Act 1984	No.	
Sale (Land Development) Act 1984	No.	
Senate Elections (Amendment) Act 1984	No.	
Stamps (Amendment) Act 1984	No.	
Stamps Act 1984	No.	
State Bank (Amendment) Act 1984	No.	
Status of Children (Amendment) Act 1984	No.	
Subordinate Legislation (Review and Revocation) Act 1984	No.	
Subordinate Legislation (Revocation) Act 1984	No.	
Superannuation (Amendment) Act 1984	No.	
Superannuation (Refund of Contributions) Act 1984	No.	
Supreme Court (Amendment) Act 1984	No.	
Town and Country Planning (Amendment) Act 1984	No.	
Transfer of Land (Amendment) Act 1984	No.	
Transport (Traffic Infringement Notices) Act 1984	No.	
Trustee (Amendment) Act 1984	No.	
Urban Land Authority (Amendment) Act 1984	No.	
Valuation of Land (Valuations) Act 1984	No.	
Wheat Marketing (Home Consumption Price) Act 1984	No.	
Wine Grape Processing Industry (Amendment) Act 1984	No.	
Workers Compensation (Amendment) Act 1984	No.	
Wrongs (Animals Straying on Highways) Act 1984	No.	
Youth, Sport and Recreation (Advisory Councils) Act 1984	No.	
Youth, Sport and Recreation (State Sports Council) Act 1984	No.	
Zoological Parks and Gardens (Liquor Licence) Act 1984	No.	

== Sources ==
- "1984 Victorian Historical Acts". AustLII.
