= Wimmera Regional Library Corporation =

The Wimmera Regional Library Corporation is situated in the northwest of Victoria, Australia. It covers an area of approximately 36,800 km^{2}. and serves two local government bodies -Horsham Rural City Council and West Wimmera Shire Council, with a combined population of approximately 23,700. As these figures indicate, its clientele is predominantly rural-based and often has considerable distances between centres.

The Wimmera Regional Library operates 5 static branches in Edenhope, Goroke, Harrow, Horsham and Kaniva.

== History ==
In the 1860s the first library was located in the Mechanics Institute in Horsham on the corner of Firebrace and Wilson streets, then in a building in Firebrace Street. In 1872 it moved to a timber building between Pynsent Street and Roberts Avenue, where it lost many books and records in a fire in 1908. When the library re-opened in 1909 it was in a new building in Pynsent street. In 1937 the name was changed from institute library to Horsham Public Library (the Horsham Mechanics Institute being the first in country Victoria to become a public library). It was called a "free library" although only subscribers could borrow, non-subscribers were allowed to read on the premises.

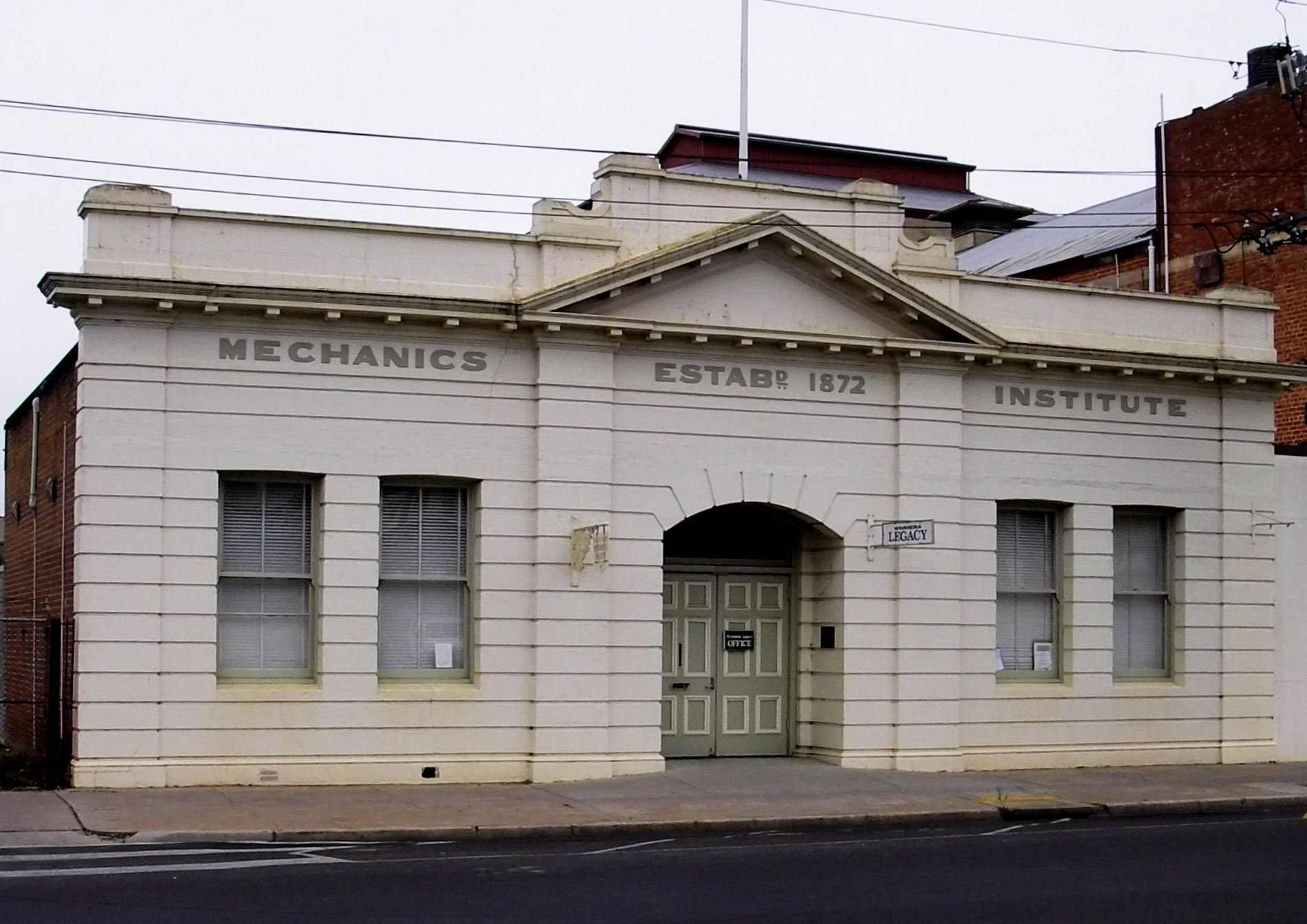
Horsham Mechanics Institute

World War II postponed plans to consign the library to the council as a municipal project, but in April 1949 the Horsham City Council took over control of the Mechanics Institute. They financed the library, and conducted it as a municipal free library – "City of Horsham Free Library" under a liberal subsidy from the State Government. The Institute building became Council property and was renovated and extended.

In 1951 the Wimmera Shire joined the Horsham City Council in financing the Library. An approach was made to the State Government Library Board in 1955 and in 1957 the Horsham Public Library was established, and The Wimmera & Dunmunkle Shires joined – the Library was then known as "The Horsham & Dunmunkle Municipal Libraries". (Wimmera Shire residents used the City resources until the introduction of the Bookmobile in 1967) In 1962 Lowan and Kaniva Shires joined.

After many meetings and discussions between the Shires and the Library Board, the inaugural meeting of the Wimmera Regional Library Service was held in June 1966 and the WRLS formed. From October 1966 it included the Shires of Arapiles, Birchip, Donald, Dunmunkle, Kaniva, Karkarooc, Lowan, Wimmera & Warracknabeal and Horsham City Council. With the joining of Birchip, Donald, Karkarooc & Warracknabeal Shires, the Library Service now covered a total of 10 municipalities, with an area of 7,871 square miles (18,000sq km) and a population of 40,694 people. Branches were at Horsham, Kaniva, Minyip, Murtoa, Nhill & Rupanyup. The Bookmobile opened in June 1967 operating in Birchip, Donald & Karkarooc Shires, and sites were at Birchip town & schools, Watchupga, Donald town & schools, Watchem, Hopetoun town & schools, Beulah town & schools, Lascelles, Patchewollock, Speed, Tempy & Woomelang. At this time the Addressograph Libromatic Scheme replaced the Browne System, this involved new book & borrower cards and complete borrower re-registration.

In March 1968 the bookmobile began service in Arapiles Shire. An offer of bookmobile service to Dunmunkle was rejected in 1969–70, however early in 1977 it was trialled, and this time the offer was accepted and the Minyip & Murtoa branches were closed in March 1981 and their stock transferred to Rupanyup.

In January 1975 a Library Council report into the Stawell Library joining the Wimmera Regional Library Service was released, but no further action was taken. Further discussions in March 1976 also stalled due to a lack of financial support from the Library Council.

Discussions began with the Shires of Kowree and Kara Kara and the Town of St Arnaud in June 1983 about the possibility of them joining the library service. Following their decision to join, service began on 1 October 1984 to St Arnaud Town and the Kara Kara Shire. The Kowree Shire Library amalgamated with the WRLS in March 1986. A Mobile service was provided to Goroke with branches in Edenhope, Harrow and a joint-use facility in Apsley (Apsley closed on 13 April 1987).

Computerisation of the library's collection was first discussed in March 1972, and conversion of the card catalogue to microfiche had begun September 1980. In 1988 as part of the introduction of a computerised library management system renovations were made to disused toilets at the rear of the Mibus Centre building to create a computer room, and storage area for the Mobile Library. A committee chose Stowe Computing on 1 December 1988, and the first AS/400 computer was installed on 2 February 1989. In April 1989 computerisation of stock began, the first branch to offer automated service was Horsham on 25 September 1989.

Stawell Regional Library finally amalgamated with WRLS in October 1993, and the Mobile library began to visit Stawell Shire sites on 31 January 1994.

Local government re-structure began in January 1995, this led to WRLS member council changing from 15 to 6 (Buloke, Hindmarsh, Horsham, Northern Grampians, West Wimmera & Yarriambiack), the size of the region increased to 36,800 km^{2}. The new Library Corporation was gazetted in April 1996 as the Wimmera Regional Library Corporation. Local Government elections were held in March 1997, and councillors returned to office. The new Wimmera Regional Library Board first met 17 April 1997.

On 12 January 1996 Horsham was the first branch of the WRLC to log onto the Internet via local service provider WimmeraNet. Other branches started offering Internet access from December 1996. Also in 1996 the Library provided its first "Food for thought" program on community 3HHH radio.

WRLC joined the Murraylink consortia in 1998 – a group of public libraries initially based along the Murray River in Victoria. Murraylink programs included a joint materials tender and roving collections of materials.

The Library Management System changed from Stowe's BookPlus to Geac's Libs+ in June–July 1999. MacroPlan/PractiCo undertook a library review into different service delivery methods in 2000. This was followed in April 2001 by John Liddle of J.L. Management Services being employed by the State Government to assess the future direction of the library service & to develop a model which could be used for other library services. The Project extended from May 2001 to March 2002 and led to Service & Funding Agreements – a "fee for service" arrangement, rationalisation of service sites and opening hours.

Satellite Internet access was provided at Horsham branch & Headquarters as part of a Rural Libraries Online project 2000/01, designed to help rural libraries move to faster Internet access. In July 2003 the first ADSL Internet connections were established at Horsham & Stawell.

In 2005 discussion began about the purchase of a new Library Management System, and the decision was made to join the Swift Consortium, which was planning for a joint system purchase, in early 2006. The new Library Management System – Sirsi-Dynix's Unicorn system went live on 3 April 2007.

In July 2018 Buloke Shire withdrew from the Wimmera Regional Library Corporation. In July 2020 Hindmarsh, Northern Grampians and Yarriambiack Councils withdrew from the Wimmera Regional Library Corporation.

== Branches ==
=== Edenhope ===
The Kowree Shire had previously operated a stand-alone single municipality library service. An approach was made by the Shire in July 1968 for information and costs associated with entering the Library Service. The Library's proposal suggested a preference for a mobile service instead of deposit stations for the small towns. No action was taken and the options were investigated again in August 1983. Finally in 1985 after another report by the Library Council of Victoria, agreement was reached on amalgamation of the two library services. The Kowree stock was added into the Wimmera collection and the Kowree Shire joined the WRLS on 31 March 1986, with the Library located in the Shire Offices. The Library moved to the new Community Centre at 78 Elizabeth St in July 2020.

=== Goroke ===
The first library in the town was the Mechanics Institute in 1889. As part of the Kowree Free Library service, a small room in the Town Hall served as the Goroke Library. When the Kowree Shire joined the WRLS in 1986, a Mobile library service was initially provided to Goroke outside the Town Hall and outside the school. The Mobile ceased visiting in December 1987, and library services returned to the Town Hall until the Library moved across the road to a refurbished shop in July 2007. The official opening was on 14 July 2007 conducted by Minister Richard Wynne and West Wimmera mayor Darren Rayner.

=== Harrow ===
Library services are provided to the Harrow community from a room in the Harrow Hall. The entire collection and furniture was lost when the Hall burnt to the ground in 1976. When the new Hall was built on the same site, a room on the south side of the Hall was set aside as the Library. Following on the amalgamation of the Kowree Shire service with the WRLS, the Harrow branch, opens for 3 hours a week, with the majority of the book stock provided on a rotational basis from the Edenhope library.

=== Horsham ===
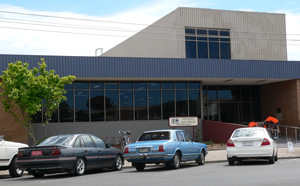
Horsham Library

The Horsham Library began in the Mechanics Institute building in Pynsent Street, but in December 1968 it moved to a purpose-built area in the Mibus Memorial Cultural Centre in McLachlan St (site of the former Temperance Hall which the Council compulsorily acquired from its Trustees, with the neighbouring block owned by Mrs Elizabeth Nattrass). The Centre housed the Horsham Library, Library Headquarters, & Art Gallery.

The Mibus Centre was a memorial for Mick Mibus, Member for Lowan & Minister for Water Supply who died in 1964. It was opened by Mibus' widow, and the Premier Sir Henry Bolte unveiled the plaque.

At the end of 1970 an engineer's report found the building had buckled, distorted & sagged, with Horsham's constant problem of expansive clay soils. Council took the builders and designers to court and won the settlement. In May 1978 the Horsham Library moved to temporary premises in the rear of the Langlands building with a third of the stock, to allow repairs to the Mibus Centre to begin. Headquarters continued to operate from the Mibus Centre during this period. In January 1979 the Horsham Library re-opened in the Mibus Centre.

Minor building works continued in the 1970s and 80s to accommodate the introduction of computerisation and changes to workflows and throughput. The Horsham Rural City Council secured a Living Libraries Grant to extend and renovate the Library branch in 2004 with building works beginning in February 2005. The Support Centre section was renovated in 2009 as a result of increased stock movements resulting from involvement in the Swift consortia.

=== Kaniva ===
The Mechanics Institute began in Kaniva in 1884. In 1922 the Mechanics Institute decided to build a Soldier's Memorial Hall and Club room at the dead-end of Dingey Street. Built of Mt Gambier stone it opened on 8 February 1923. The WRLS Kaniva Branch officially opened in July 1964, in a small shop in the main street. On 13 February 1969 the new Library building was officially opened by Vance O. Dickie MLC, State Minister of Health, as part of the Civic buildings (including the Infant Welfare and Pre-School Centres) in Baker St, on the site of the old Kaniva electricity supply power-house which had stood there between 1925 and 1964.
