= Xin Jin Shan Chinese Library =

Chinese-language library in Ballarat, Victoria

- 新金山中文圖書館
- 37.56156548579987°S 143.85751236441786°E
- Location: Ballarat, Victoria, Australia
- Type: Public library
- Established: 2023

Other information
- Website: xjslibrary.org.au

The Xin Jin Shan Chinese Library (Chinese: 新金山中文圖書館) is a public library in Ballarat, Victoria. It was founded in 2023 by Haoliang Sun and is located at 200 Sturt Street. Its collection includes over 200,000 Chinese-language books.

== History ==
Founded by retired philosopher and educator Haoliang Sun, the Xin Jin Shan Chinese Library (Traditional Chinese: 新金山中文圖書館) was initially set up in a garage. Xin Jin Shan (Chinese: 新金山, lit. 'New Gold Mountain') was a term used by Chinese immigrants in the 1850s to refer to the Victorian goldfields. At one point, around a quarter of people in Ballarat were Chinese. Sun donated 10,000 books from the collection of his Mount Waverly Chinese bookshop, which closed 20 years ago, with the rest purchased or donated from universities, Chinese publishers and the Chinese Australian community. Volunteers helped to transport, catalogue and sort the items.

In April 2022, the Library moved into 200 Sturt Street, a former bank building on the corners of Ballarat's Lydiard and Sturt Streets, after Sun purchased a floor of the building. He later purchased the entire building. The Library spans 16 rooms across 700m^{2}.

The Xin Jin Shan Chinese Library officially opened on 22 January 2023. It is open to the public free-of-charge. Committee member Charles Zhang, president of the Chinese Australian Cultural Society Ballarat, told SBS Mandarin that the Library also served as an education and research centre for Chinese languages and Chinese Australian settlement and a "multi-functional centre for local communities".

== Contents ==
As of July 2022, the Xin Jin Shan Chinese Library contains over 240,000 documents. Journalists reporting on the library's opening wrote that it was the largest collection of Chinese-language books in the Southern Hemisphere. They are categorized into sections for education, Chinese literature, world literature, biography, humanities, sociology and philosophy. It stores some of the only known copies of certain manuscripts, such as an 1857 Chinese Bible from the Victorian gold rush and a research compilation into the Chinese language, donated by the University of Melbourne. The Library contains classic books such as the Bencao Gangmu.

The library contains several notable artworks by Chinese artists. At the entrance hangs a Shen Jiawei painting titled Silent Dialogue, which depicts Guboo Ted Thomas, an Aboriginal Australian leader with a Chinese mother.
