= Eastern Regional Libraries =

Australian regional library corporation

Your Library (formerly the Eastern Regional Libraries Corporation) provides library services to the Cities of Knox, Maroondah and the Shire of Yarra Ranges in Victoria, Australia. The system has fourteen branch libraries, two community reading rooms and two mobile libraries to service the municipalities.

Services provided include mobile services, free internet access, an extensive database collection, homebound services, public computers and beginners IT training, meeting rooms and numerous community-based programs for all ages.

== History ==
The Eastern Regional Libraries service was founded by the former Shire of Knox in 1965 and was known as the Regional Library Service. In 1968, an agreement was made between the former Shire of Knox and the former City of Ringwood to provide library services to both municipalities, with the service renamed to the Eastern Metropolitan Regional Library Service (EMRLS). The EMRLS continued to expand over the next decade by incorporating more branches and service points in Ringwood, Croydon, Healesville, Belgrave, Boronia, Ferntree Gully and Rowville. Mobile services were also added to the Healesville and Sherbrooke areas.

In March 1978, EMRLS changed its name to Eastern Regional Libraries (ERL). In September 1995, Eastern Regional Libraries amalgamated with the Lilydale Library Service (branches at Lilydale, Montrose, Mooroolbark and Mt. Evelyn). The title Eastern Regional Libraries was retained.

In 2022, the Eastern Regional Libraries Corporation Board made an in-principle decision to move to a new corporate structure, to be known as Your Library Limited.

In 2023, the move over to the new corporate structure was completed and is now trading as Your Library Limited.

== Branches ==
=== Bayswater Library ===
Bayswater Library was officially opened on 1 May 2013 after its initial plans for development were announced in 2008. Located within the Mountain High Shopping Centre and across from the Bayswater train station, the library has been decorated with a railway theme. One of the main features of Bayswater Library includes the installation of RFID borrowing stations and an automated returns machine.

=== Belgrave Library ===
The Belgrave Library was opened in 1997 and was designed with a cedar exterior to blend in with the local setting of Belgrave. The building also features stained glass windows that were originally part of the Shire of Sherbrooke council offices. Belgrave library is the only ERL branch to house the music scores collection.

=== Boronia Library ===
Boronia Library was opened 14 July 1986. Located next to the Boronia Basketball Stadium, the library was designed as a centre of recreation. Inside, the central skylight mural illustrates Boronia's historical past.

=== Ferntree Gully Library ===
Ferntree Gully Library was opened on 2 January 1980. The library currently shares its location with the Ferntree Gully Community Centre. Ferntree Gully library is known for its strong contribution towards early childhood programs and its involvement in the Knox Festival.

=== Knox Library ===
Knox Library opened on 8 November 1977 and is located within the Westfield Knox shopping centre. Among its many attractions is the Chinese collection of books, CDs and DVDs. One of the main features of Knox Library is the automated returns machine, which was installed in November, 2012. In 2024 Knox Library moved to level 3 of Westfield Knox.

=== Rowville Library ===
Rowville Library was opened on 21 August 1989 under the clock tower at Stud Park Shopping Centre. Rowville Library has a strong community focus and is well known for its participation in Rowville's annual Stringybark Festival.

=== Croydon Library ===
Croydon Library was opened on 15 October 1973 and by 2023 had celebrated 50 years of community operation. The library is situated beside a small lake and the Maroondah City Council Service Centre. The Croydon Library specialises in historical material and maintains the local history, genealogy and military history collections. The library also houses the Croydon Historical Society.

=== Realm ===
Ringwood Library originally opened in Warrandyte Road, Ringwood, on 4 May 1970 and later moved to the Eastland Shopping Centre district in March 1995. In October, 2013, Ringwood Library returned to the original building in Warrandyte Road while the new Ringwood Library, Learning and Cultural Centre and Town Square (Realm) was under construction. The new Realm library opened at Eastland Shopping Centre on 29 October 2015. The building also houses an art gallery and a cafe.

=== Healesville Library ===
Healesville Library opened on 10 December 1975. In 2010, Healesville Library underwent a refurbishment and became part of the Yarra Ranges Council Community Link building

=== Lilydale Library ===
Lilydale Library joined the Eastern Regional Libraries service in 1995.Lilydale Library is located on the Lilydale Lakeside Campus of Box Hill Institute.

=== Montrose Library ===
The Montrose Library was opened on 3 May 1986 and is located at the foot of the Dandenong Ranges next to the Montrose Town Hall.

=== Mooroolbark Library ===
Mooroolbark Library opened in July 1984. It is located close to the Mooroolbark Station and overlooks Hookey Park.

=== Yarra Junction Library ===
Yarra Junction Library opened in Hoddle Street in 1993.

=== Mobile Libraries ===
The first mobile library services were introduced in 1977 to the Healesville and Sherbrooke area. The Upper Yarra Mobile was added in 1981 and the Knox Mobile in 1985. Following the amalgamation of Eastern Regional Libraries in 1995 with Lilydale Library Service, the mobile services were streamlined into the Knox Mobile, Ranges Mobile and Valley Mobile to service all three council municipalities.

In 2011, the mobile library service underwent an infrastructure review, and the Valley Mobile was retired and the service points reassigned to the Ranges Mobiles.

In September 2012, the Knox Mobile was retired and replaced with a new vehicle, with the service being re-branded as the Knox Outreach. The timetables were further re-designed to include visits to residential care facilities, community housing, small local shopping districts and for festival attendance. Yarra Ranges Outreach Vehicle was also introduced in September 2012 and provides services to aged care facilities, retirement villages, caravan parks. The Yarra Ranges Flexi Vehicle was also commissioned and provides library services and storytimes to children's playgroups, kindergartens and recreational parks within the Shire of Yarra Ranges.

Both mobile services are subject to availability restrictions on days of Total Fire Ban and Extreme Weather Conditions and will not operate under certain conditions

=== Community Hub Reading Rooms ===
Community Reading Rooms were implemented in 2012 to provide library service points that were previously covered by the mobile libraries. The reading rooms were designed to be completely self-serviceable. All reading rooms are fully equipped with RFID technology that allows patrons to browse, borrow, return, order and collect reserved library items.

There are currently three reading rooms serviced by Eastern Regional Libraries:

Monbulk Community Hub – is located in the Monbulk Living and Learning Centre and was opened 9 January 2012

Yarra Glen Memorial Hall Community Reading Room– is located at Yarra Glen Memorial Hall and was opened in April, 2012.

Mount Evelyn Station House- is located in the same location of the former Mount Evelyn Library. The community hub was re-designed and re-opened in August 2013 under the management of Morrison House.

== See also ==
- Libraries in Melbourne
