= Whitehorse Manningham Libraries =

Whitehorse Manningham Regional Library Corporation
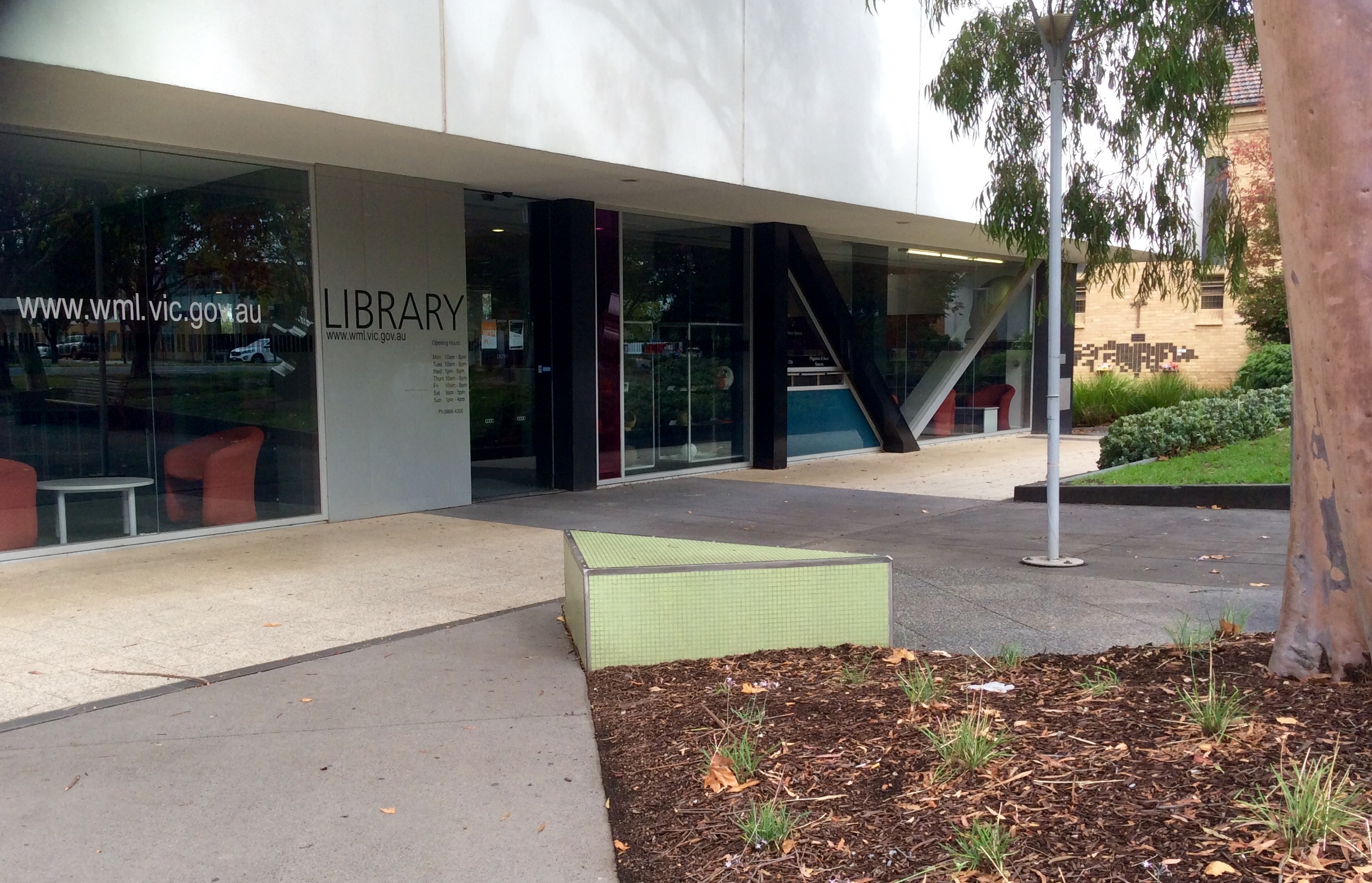
- Box Hill Library, a branch of the Whitehorse Manningham Regional Library Corporation
- Location: Nunawading, Victoria, Australia, 3131
- Type: Public library
- Established: 1996
- Branches: 8

Other information
- Website: https://www.wml.vic.gov.au/Home

Whitehorse Manningham Regional Library Corporation provides library services to the City of Manningham and the City of Whitehorse. City of Manningham covers 114 square kilometres. The estimated population was 119,442 in 2015. The languages spoken include Cantonese, Greek, Mandarin, Italian and Arabic. The City of Whitehorse covers 64 square kilometres. The estimated population was 163,697 in 2014.

The combined library service was established in 1996 on the amalgamation of the City of Nunawading Library Service and the Box Hill/Doncaster Library Service.

== Branch libraries ==
There are eight branch libraries.

- Blackburn
- Box Hill
- Bulleen
- Doncaster
- Nunawading
- The Pines
- Vermont South
- Warrandyte

== External references ==
- Library website
- The City of Manningham
- The City of Whitehorse
