= PMI Victorian History Library =

Library in Victoria, Australia

PMI Victorian History Library Inc.
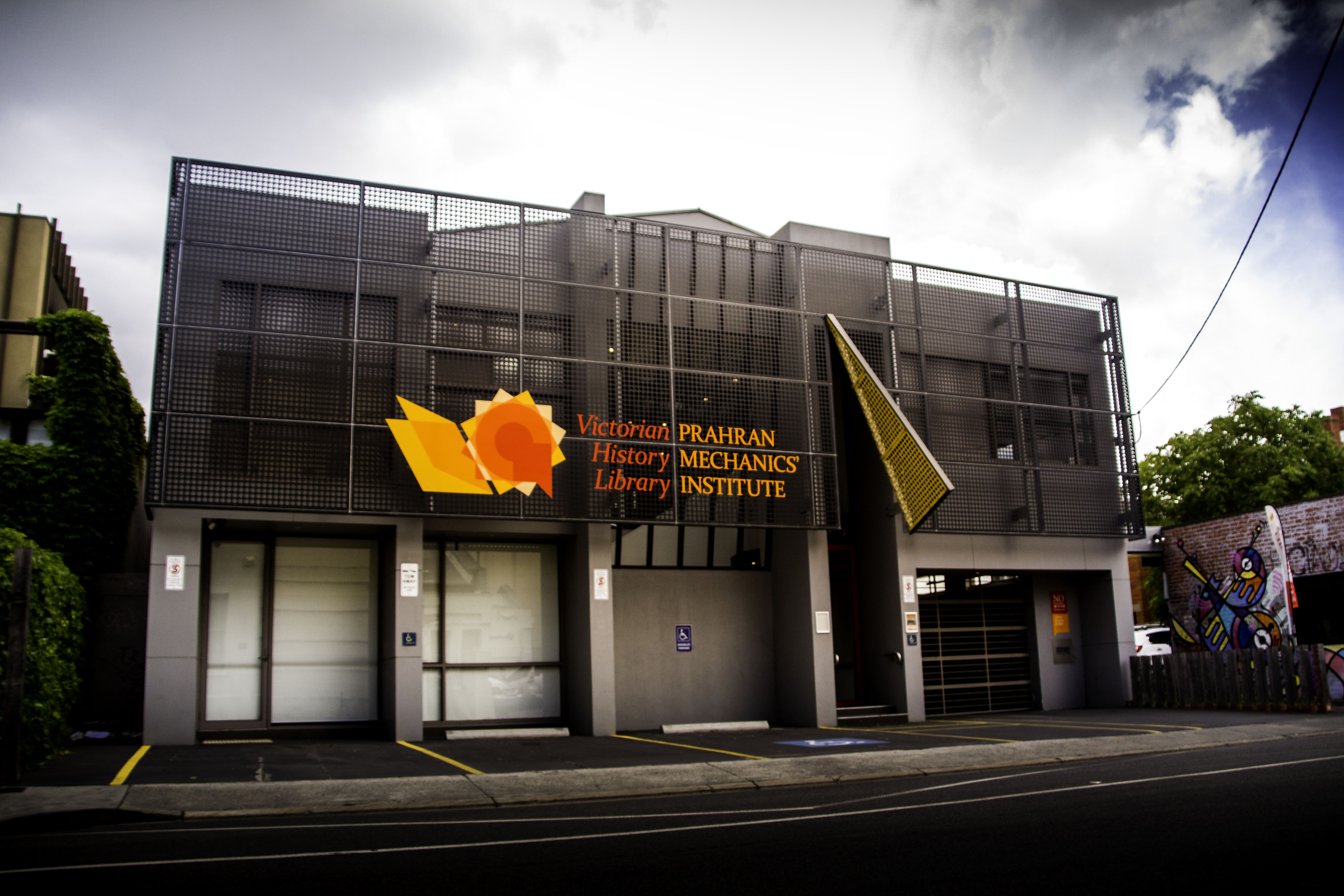
- 37°50′59″S 144°59′29″E
- Location: 39 St Edmonds Road, Prahran, Victoria, Australia
- Type: Mechanics' Institute
- Established: 1854

Other information
- Website: PMI Victorian History Library

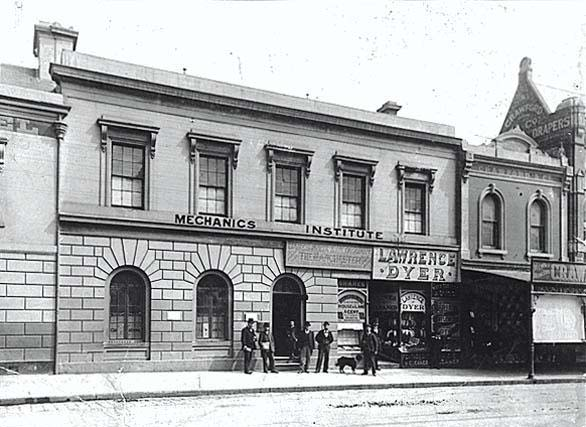
Prahran Mechanics' Institute on Chapel Street in 1856

PMI Victorian History Library Inc. (formerly Prahran Mechanics' Institute) is a community-owned subscription library situated at 39 St Edmonds Road, Prahran, Victoria, Australia. The library focuses on collecting resources about every locality in Victoria and every aspect of the history of the state. The library was previously situated in High Street, Prahran from 1915 to 2014 and Chapel Street, Prahran from 1854 to 1915. It is one of the oldest surviving Mechanics' Institutes in Victoria and one of only six still operating as a lending library. It was the only mechanics' institute in Victoria still governed by its own act of Parliament. In 2022 it incorporated as the PMI Victorian History Library Inc. under the Associations Incorporation Reform Act 2012.

The institute spawned the Prahran Technical School, which went on to be one of Australia's leading art schools.

== History ==
The Prahran Mechanics' Institute was established in 1854 in Chapel Street, Prahran by subscriptions and donations from the local community in an aim to facilitate lectures, discussions, a library, reading rooms, classes, and a museum.

In 1908 the Prahran Mechanics' Institute established the Prahran Technical School which operated firstly at Chapel Street, then at High Street from 1915 until 1971. In 2004 the High Street building was included in the Victorian Heritage Register for its architectural and cultural significance.

Since 1981 the PMI library has specialised as a Victorian history research collection and as the only lending collection of its kind in Australia.

In 2009 Prahran Mechanics' Institute sold the building located on High Street to Swinburne University of Technology. The PMI then purchased a building in nearby St Edmonds Road, Prahran and relocated in 2015.

The new and current PMI Victorian History Library at 39 St Edmonds Road, Prahran was officially opened by the Mayor of Stonnington, Cr Melina Sehr and PMI President Cr John Chandler OAM on 30 May 2015.

The PMI is run by a volunteer board of seven people.

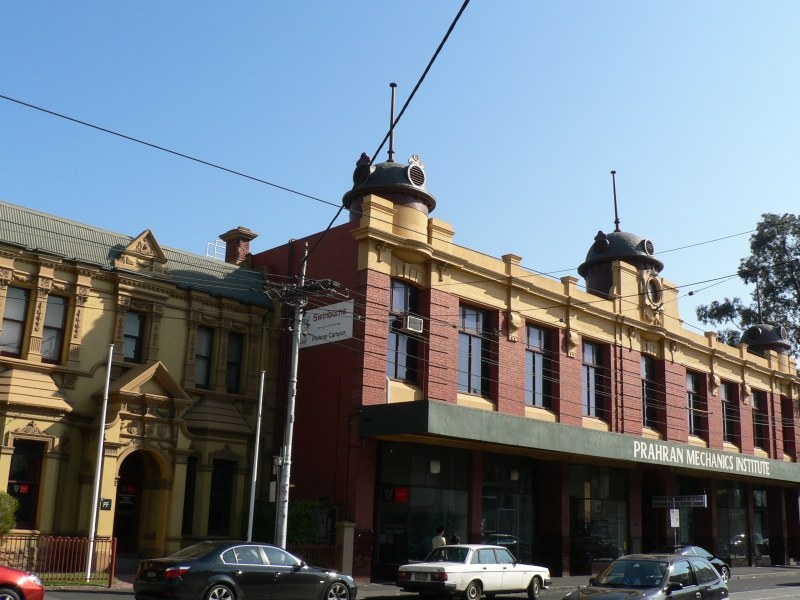
Prahran Mechanics' Institute on High Street in 2006

== Collections ==
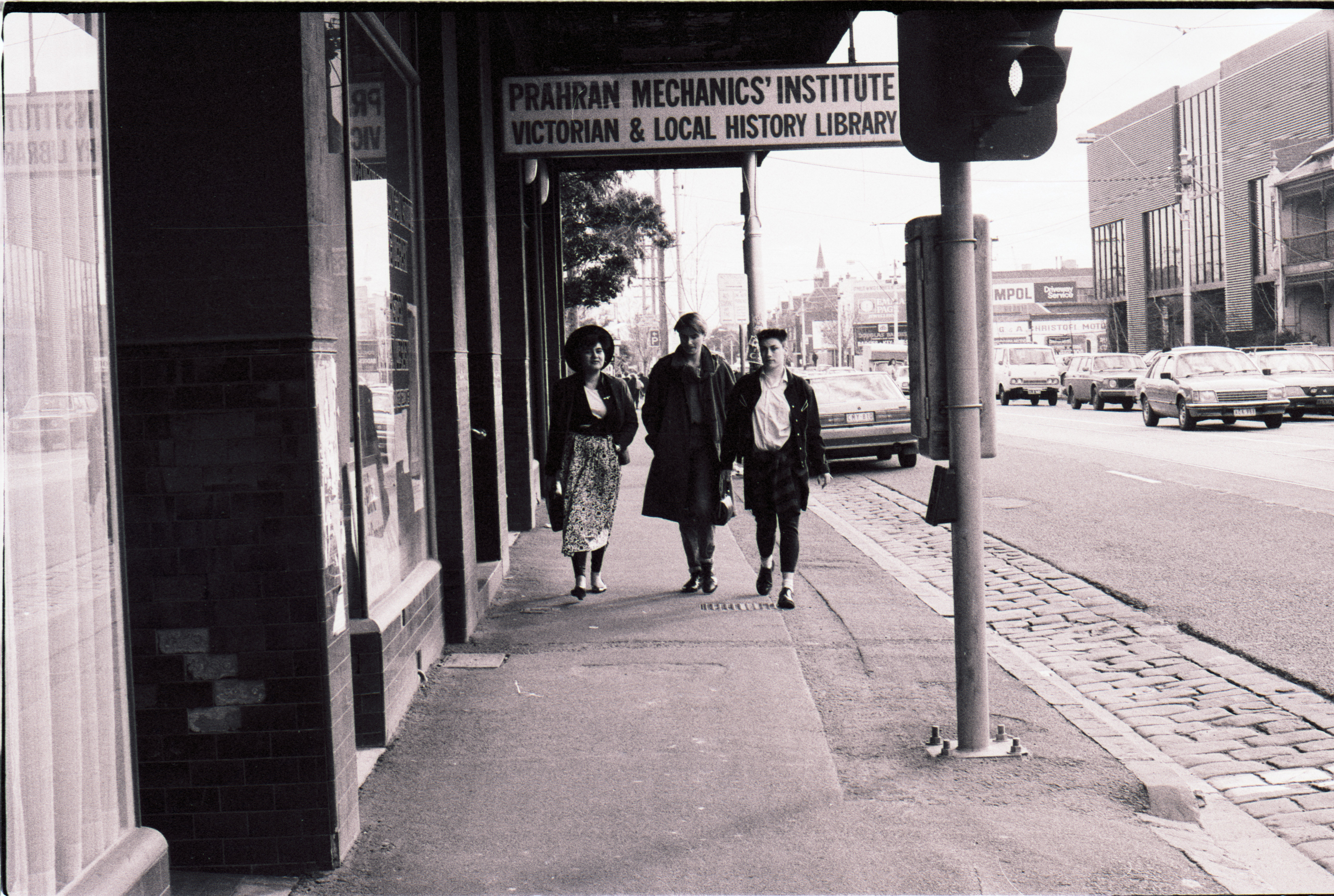
1989 - Prahran Mechanic's institute

In the early 1980s the Prahran Mechanics’ Institute devised a new collection policy which concentrated its resources on providing a lending collection specialising in the history of Victoria. The Victorian history collection is the only collection of its kind available for loan to the general public and has now expanded to include items about Australia and other Australian states. The PMI building is the current home of special collections of the Mechanics’ Institute of Victoria, the Cinema and Theatre Historical Society and the Victorian Railway History Library.

With more than 40,000 books for loan and a professional information service for members, it provides a central resource for research into the history of Victoria and Australia.

The collection continues to grow steadily through purchases and donations.

== Services ==
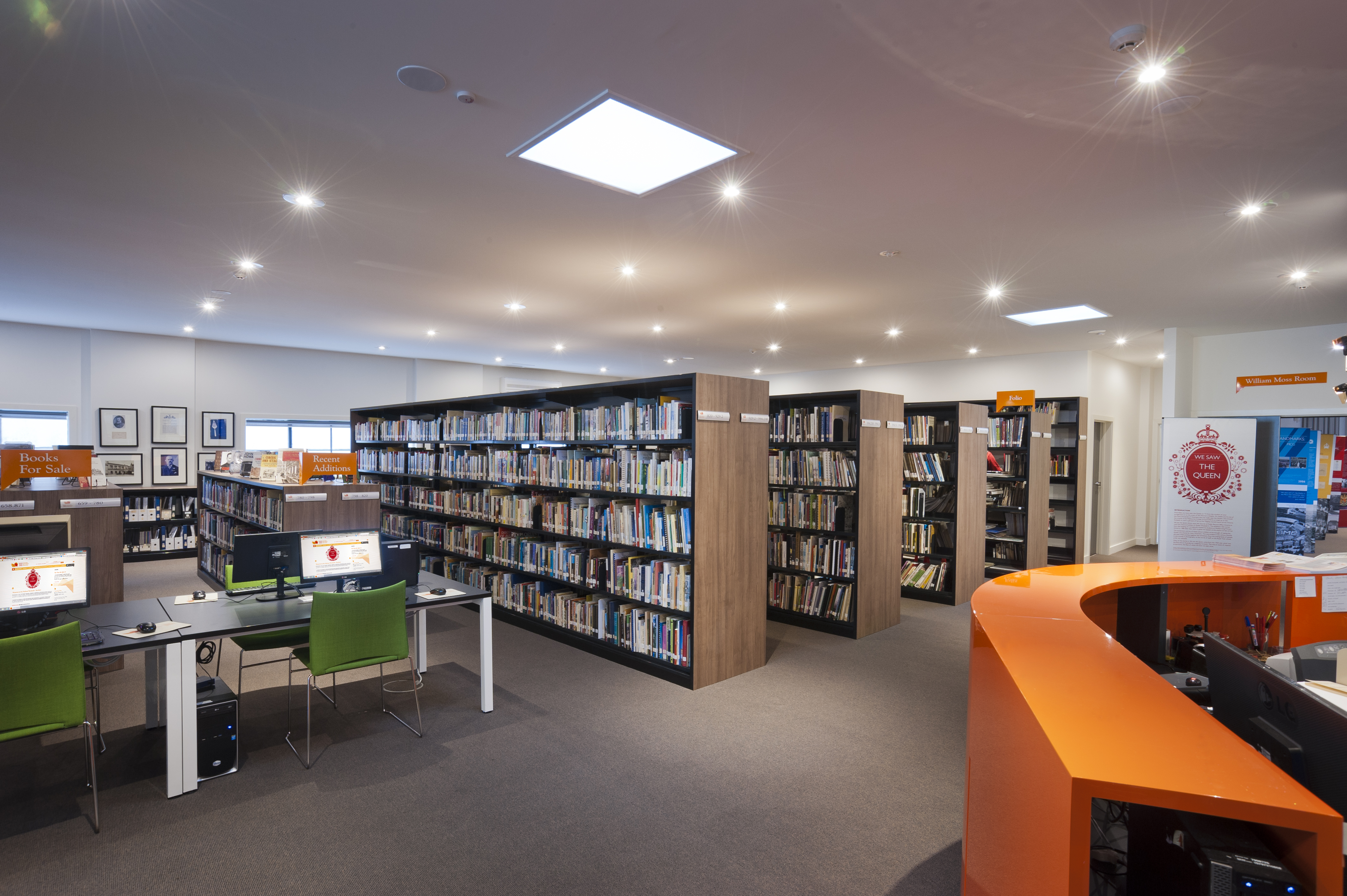
PMI Victorian History Library, interior

In addition to an extensive lending and reference library specialising in works about Victorian and Australian history, the library organises events, seminars, and competitions to encourage and facilitate the study of history.

In the long tradition of mechanics' institutes, PMI runs a programme of educational activities including free public lectures and workshops. It also operated the Prahran Mechanics' Institute Press, which was a not-for-profit publishing service for authors writing about aspects of the history of Victoria.

== Affiliations ==
- Mechanics' Institutes of Victoria
- Cinema and Theatre Historical Society
