= Diamond Valley College =

Location
- Hurstbridge Rd; Diamond Creek, Victoria; 37.6720°S 145.1670°E

Information
- Type: Secondary school
- Motto: Respect, Responsibility & Excellence
- Established: 1989
- Principal: Samuel Luck
- Grades: 7 to 12
- Enrollment: 843
- Colours: Navy & white
- Association: None
- Website: www.dvallcoll.vic.edu.au

Diamond Valley College is a public co-educational school in Diamond Creek, Victoria, a suburb of Melbourne, Australia.

== Location ==
Diamond Valley College serves an area which stretches from the rural communities of Yarrambat, Arthurs Creek, Strathewen Kinglake, St Andrews and Panton Hill to the residential areas of Hurstbridge, Wattle Glen, Kangaroo Ground and Diamond Creek. The college community is well defined and its students are drawn from a limited number of primary schools. The college operates an extensive transport system with roughly more than 400 students travelling to school by bus. The school is located in close proximity to Melbourne's public transport system, being a short walking distance from Diamond Creek railway station and bus stops serviced by the route 580.

== Enrolment ==
Approximately 110 per year level.

== Year levels ==
Diamond Valley College is an educational school for years 7 to 12. A range of subjects are offered to year 11 & 12 students, including VCE and VCAL programs. Subject selection includes Dance, Music Performance, four possible sciences, Mathematics including Specialist Maths, metalwork, textiles and Italian. Students are encouraged to take six subjects at each level, with English being compulsory for all students.

== History ==
Diamond Valley College was formed in 1989 at the direction of the Minister of Education from the amalgamation of Diamond Creek Technical School and Hurstbridge High School. In 1999 the College was consolidated in new and refurbished buildings at Diamond Creek following a $4,000,000 building program. During 2002 the College Council made the decision to build a VCE Centre which recognizes the particular study and organizational needs of students in the Senior Sub-School. Building of the VCE Centre was completed for the beginning of third term, 2003. 2006 saw the completion of $350,000 modifications to open up more space in the library resource centre, art studios and technology workshops. During 2006 the college went through the process of installing $100,000 of new computer equipment and higher speed infrastructure to improve student access on and off campus. During 2007 a synthetic grass soccer field and tennis courts adjacent to the gymnasium were completed. In late 2015, it was announced that Greg Williams was to step down as principal and be replaced by Allison Bennett. Bennett resigned in late 2023.

== Rock Eisteddfod ==
Diamond Valley College has been regularly involved in Rock Eisteddfod for many years now, in 1998 being the Grand National Winner and in 2007 advancing to the Melbourne Grand Finals where they lost to St Helena College.

== Notable alumni ==
- Merrick Watts – Comedian
- Dylan Grimes – AFL Footballer
- Kirsty Lamb – AFLW Footballer
