= Pheasant Creek, Victoria =

Pheasant Creek
- Town
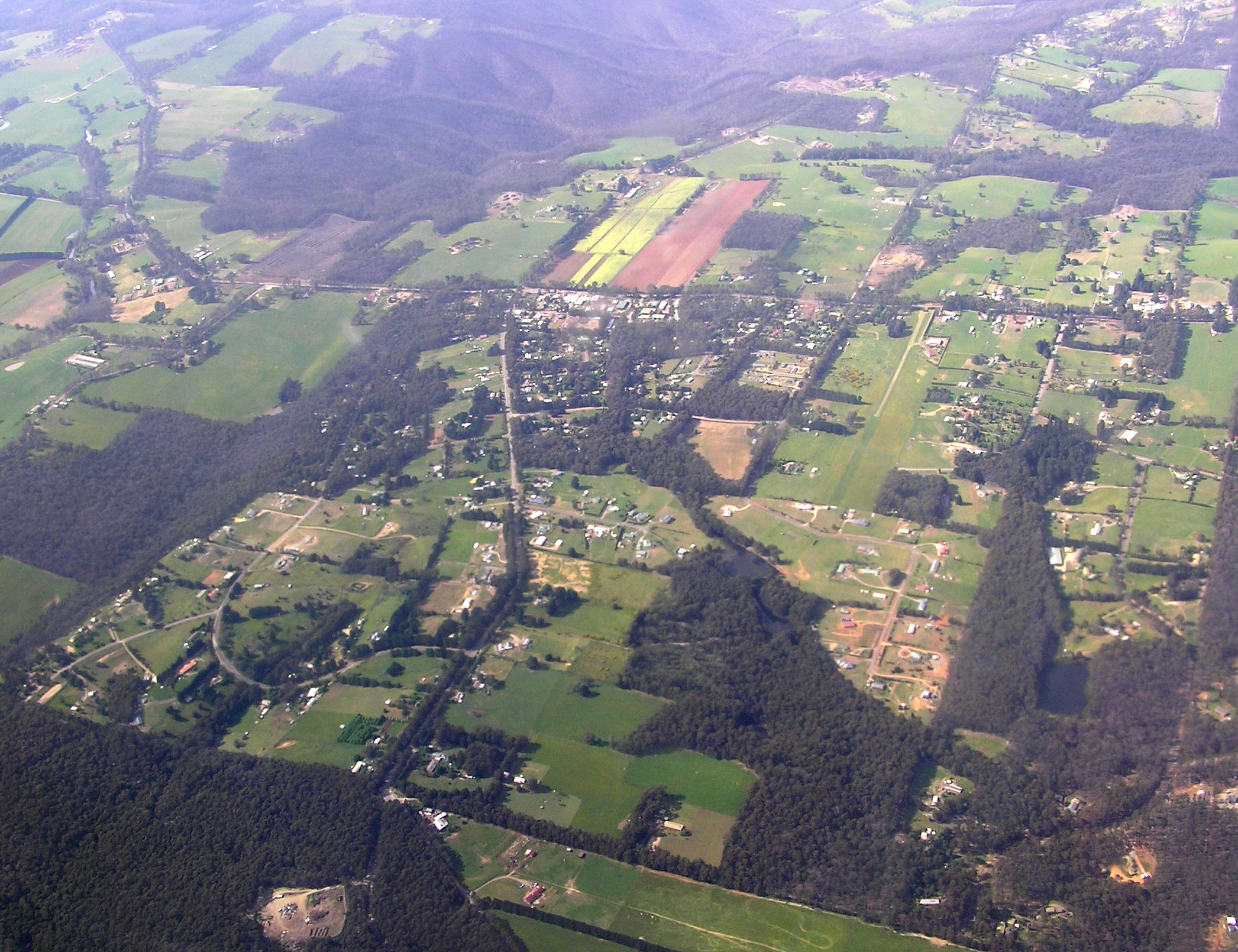
- view from north

- Coordinates: 37°29′S 145°17′E
- Country: Australia
- State: Victoria
- Region: Hume
- LGA: Shire of Murrindindi
- Location: 59 km (37 mi) N of Melbourne

Government
  - State electorate: Eildon
  - Federal division: Indi

Population
  - Total: 360 (2021 census)
- Postcode: 3757
Localities around Pheasant Creek
| Lazy Anchor | Hazeldene | Glenburn |
| Kinglake West | Pheasant Creek | Kinglake Central |
| Humevale | Strathewen | Kinglake |

Pheasant Creek is a locality in Victoria to the east of Kinglake West and to the west of Kinglake Central. Named after the creek that passes through the north of the town, Pheasant Creek is a largely residential area with moderately sized bush blocks connecting pine plantations to the north with the Kinglake National Park to the south. Pheasant Creek also contains a small industrial estate hosting a variety of small businesses, and a small commercial area consisting of a General Store, Bakery and Gym.

== Features and amenities ==
Pheasant Creek Post Office opened around 1902.

Due to its low population and close proximity to Kinglake West, Pheasant Creek has little in the way of community services. While the General Store handles basic supplies and post services, many residents travel to nearby Kinglake or Whittlesea for shopping and health services, while students generally attend Kinglake West Primary School and Whittlesea Secondary College

== Transport ==
=== Bus ===
Pheasant Creek is served by the 384 bus route, connecting Pheasant Creek to Kinglake, Humevale and Whittlesea. To travel further south from Whittlesea, you can transfer on route 382 (Whittlesea - Northland SC via South Morang) or route 385.

A daily V/Line Melbourne to Mansfield coach service also passes through nearby Kinglake West.

== 2009 bushfires ==
Pheasant Creek was one of the towns impacted by the 2009 Victorian bushfires. While surrounding localities on all sides were all largely devastated, Pheasant Creek suffered major losses primarily on its southern edge in areas surrounding the national park, while the northern area remained largely untouched.
