= Kinglake West =

- Town
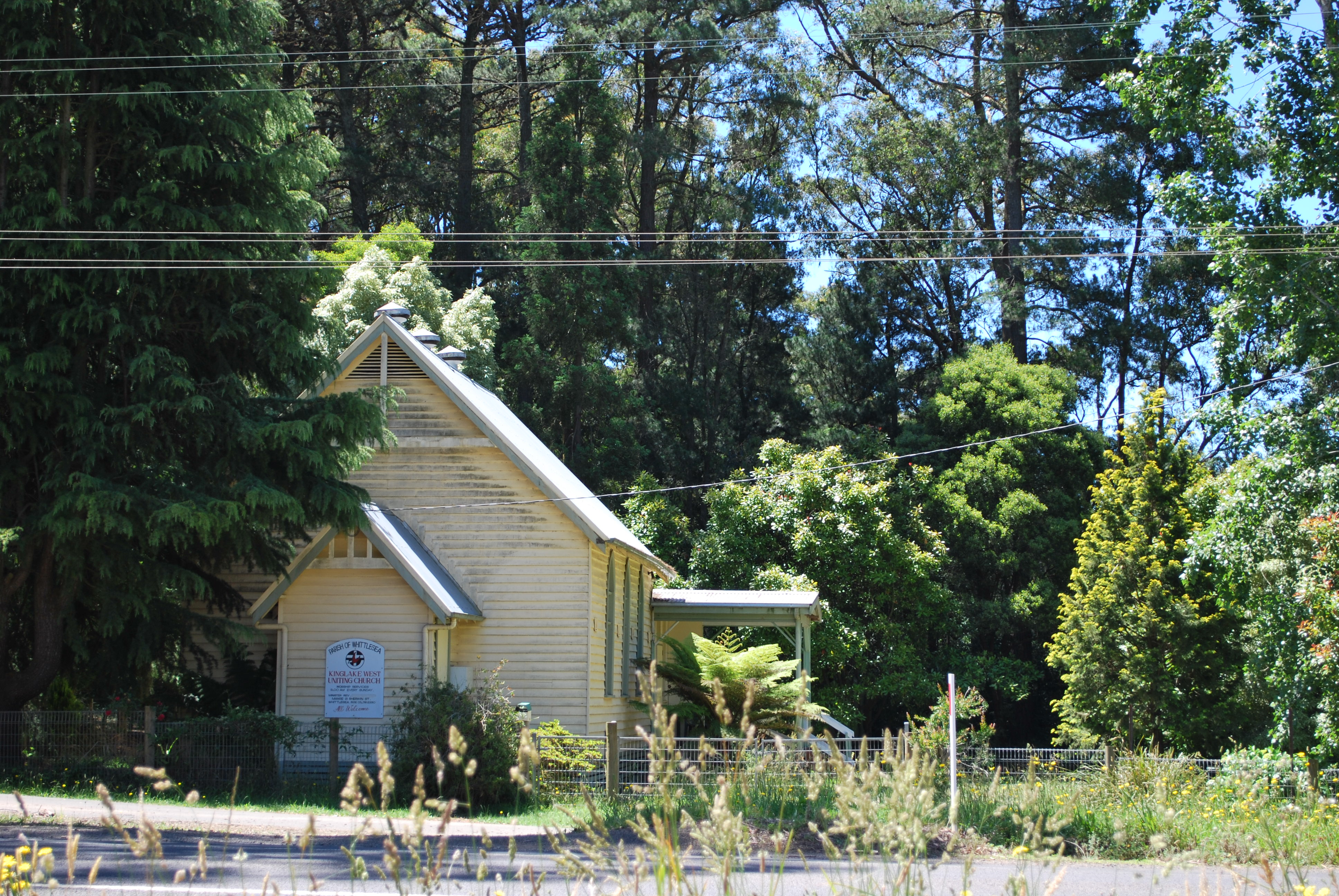
- Uniting church

- Interactive map of Kinglake West
- Coordinates: 37°28′S 145°14′E
- Country: Australia
- State: Victoria
- Region: Hume
- LGAs: Shire of Murrindindi; Shire of Nillumbik; City of Whittlesea
- Location: 45 km (28 mi) NE of Melbourne; 12 km (7.5 mi) NE of Whittlesea

Government
  - State electorates: Eildon; Yan Yean
  - Federal divisions: Indi; McEwen

Population
  - Total: 1,305 (2021 census)
- Postcode: 3757
Localities around Kinglake West
Clonbinane	Flowerdale	Kinglake Central
Clonbinane	Kinglake West	Kinglake; Pheasant Creek
Humevale	Arthurs Creek	Strathewen

Kinglake West is a town in Victoria, Australia, 45 km (28 mi) north-east of Melbourne's Central Business District, located within the City of Whittlesea and the Shires of Murrindindi and Nillumbik local government areas. Kinglake West recorded a population of 1,305 at the 2021 census.

The town was substantially damaged in the 2009 Black Saturday bushfires, including 10 fatalities.

== History ==
Kinglake West is situated north-east of Whittlesea in the Kinglake Ranges, part of the Great Dividing Range. Only Kinglake West is in the City of Whittlesea. The area was named after the surveyor Alexander Kinglake, who marked out a track over the ranges in 1878.

Gold was first discovered in the area in 1861. The area was later cleared for timber and farming. Timber milling had a relatively long life. There were tramways for transporting timber from the Kinglake area to the Whittlesea railway station (1911–26). Some mill workers also took up farming as the mills closed.

The deep soil yielded good crops of stone fruit, some fruit and berries. Due to competition from Tasmania, there was a decline in berry farming. By the 1940s, the predominant crop in the area was potatoes.

Kinglake West Post Office opened around 1902 and was destroyed by fire on 7 February 2009.

=== Kinglake West 'Prisoner of War' Camp ===
Soon after the outbreak of war in February 1940, 14,000 Victorians were registered as 'aliens'. With the escalation of the war, 343 of these were interned.

== Population ==
In the 2021 census, there were 1,305 people in Kinglake West. 81.8% of people were born in Australia and 85.3% of people spoke only English at home. The most common responses for religion were No Religion 50.3% and Catholic 16.9%.

== Transport ==
=== Bus ===
One bus route services Kinglake West:

- 384 : Kinglake – Whittlesea via Humevale. Operated by Dysons.
