= Steels Creek, Victoria =

Steels Creek
- Town
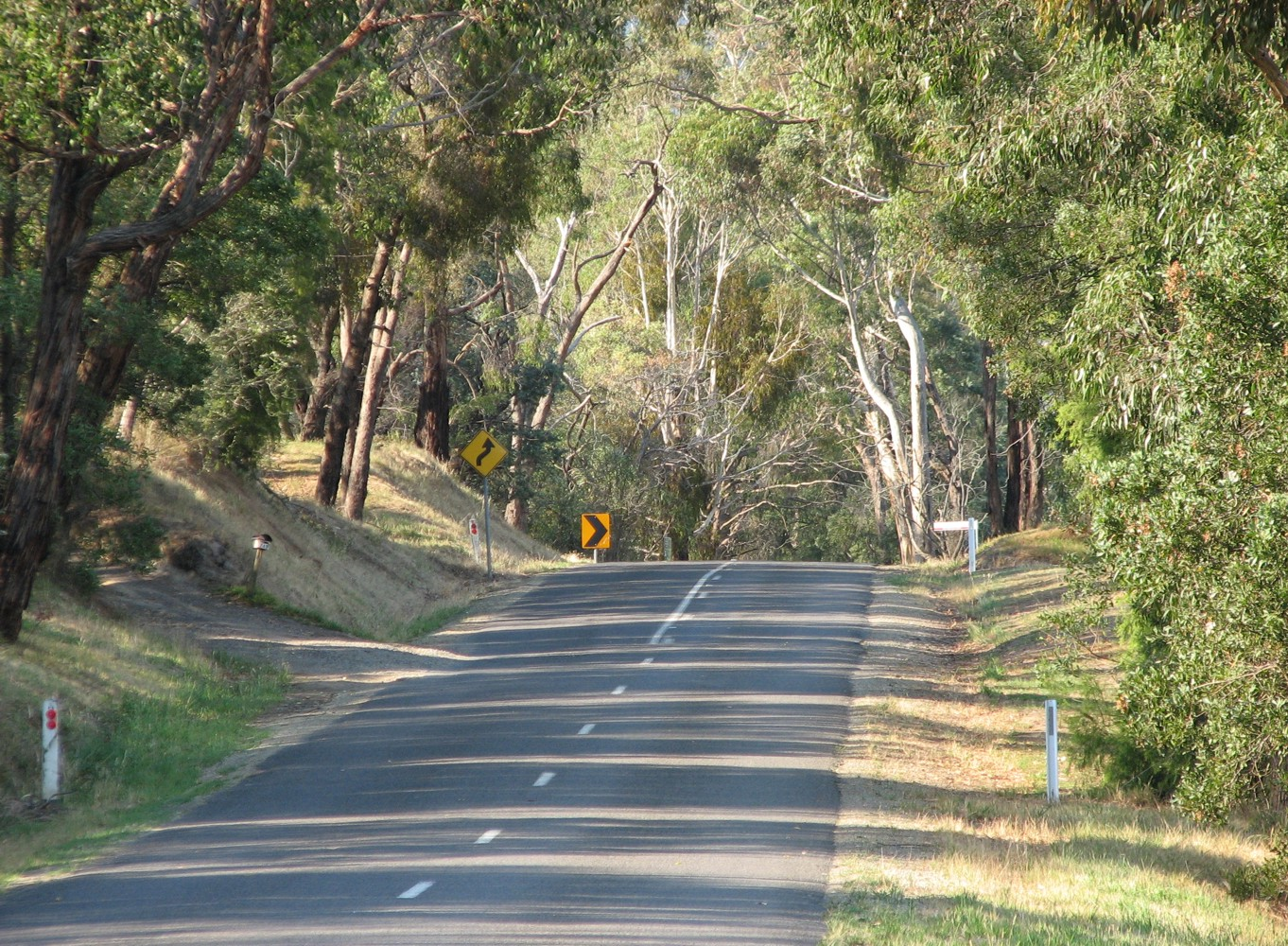
- Steels Creek Road

- Interactive map of Steels Creek
- Coordinates: 37.594°S 145.374°E
- Country: Australia
- State: Victoria
- LGA: Shire of Yarra Ranges
- Location: 45 km (28 mi) from Melbourne

Government
  - State electorate: Eildon
  - Federal division: McEwen

Population
  - Total: 276 (2021 census)
- Postcode: 3775
Localities around Steels Creek
Kinglake	Castella	Dixons Creek
Kinglake	Steels Creek	Dixons Creek
Christmas Hills	Yarra Glen	Dixons Creek

Steels Creek is a town and rural locality in the Shire of Yarra Ranges, Victoria, Australia. The settlement is located 45 km north-east of Melbourne's central business district and 7 km north of Yarra Glen, within the Greater Melbourne area. Steels Creek recorded a population of 276 at the 2021 census.

The Post Office, Steels' Creek, opened on 14 March 1890 and closed in 1968.

Steels Creek has a community centre at the site of the public Primary School, which was closed down in 1992 by the Kennett Government.

== 2009 bushfire ==
At least 26 houses were destroyed in a major bushfire on 7 February 2009.

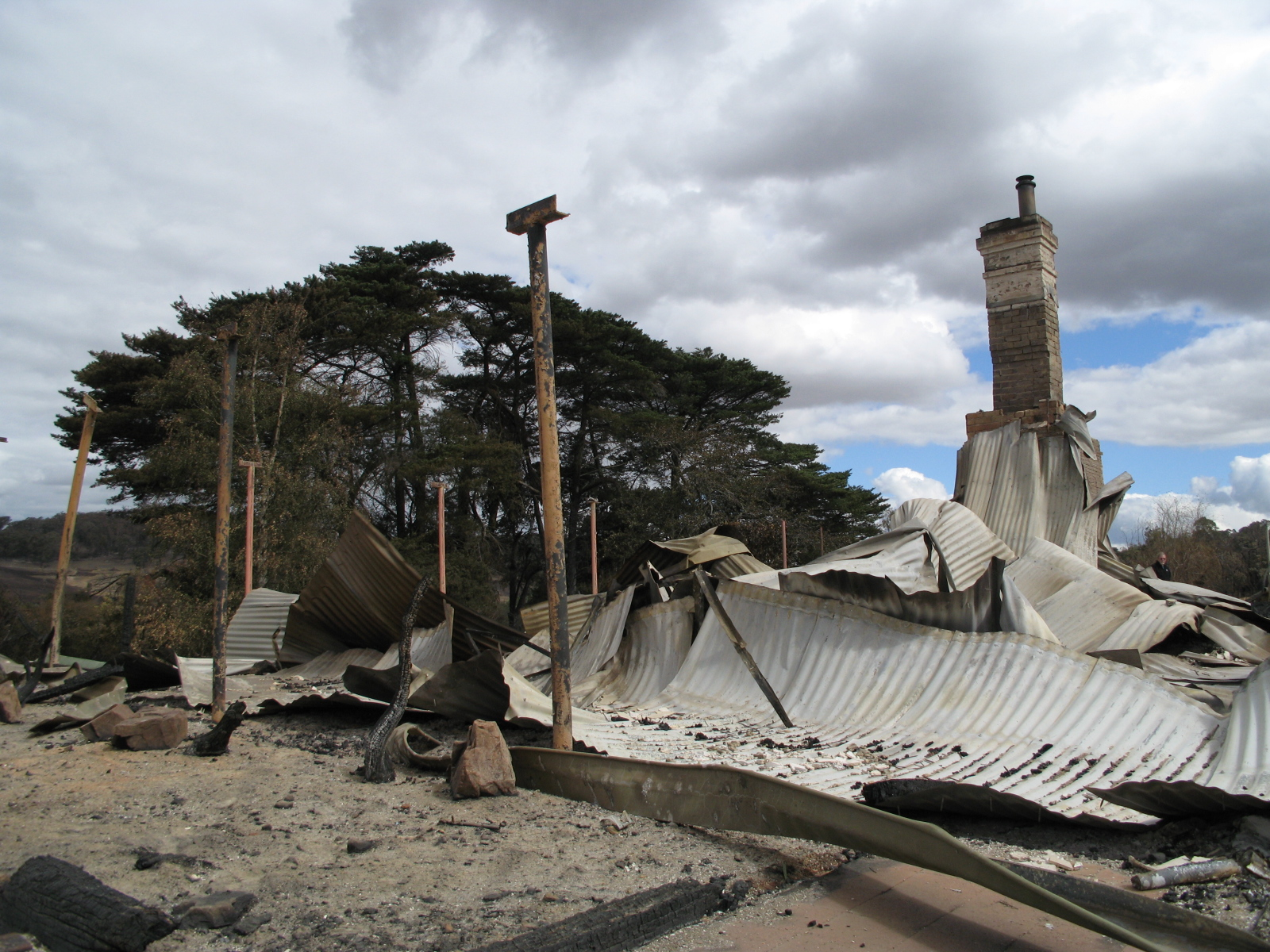
2009 bushfire damage

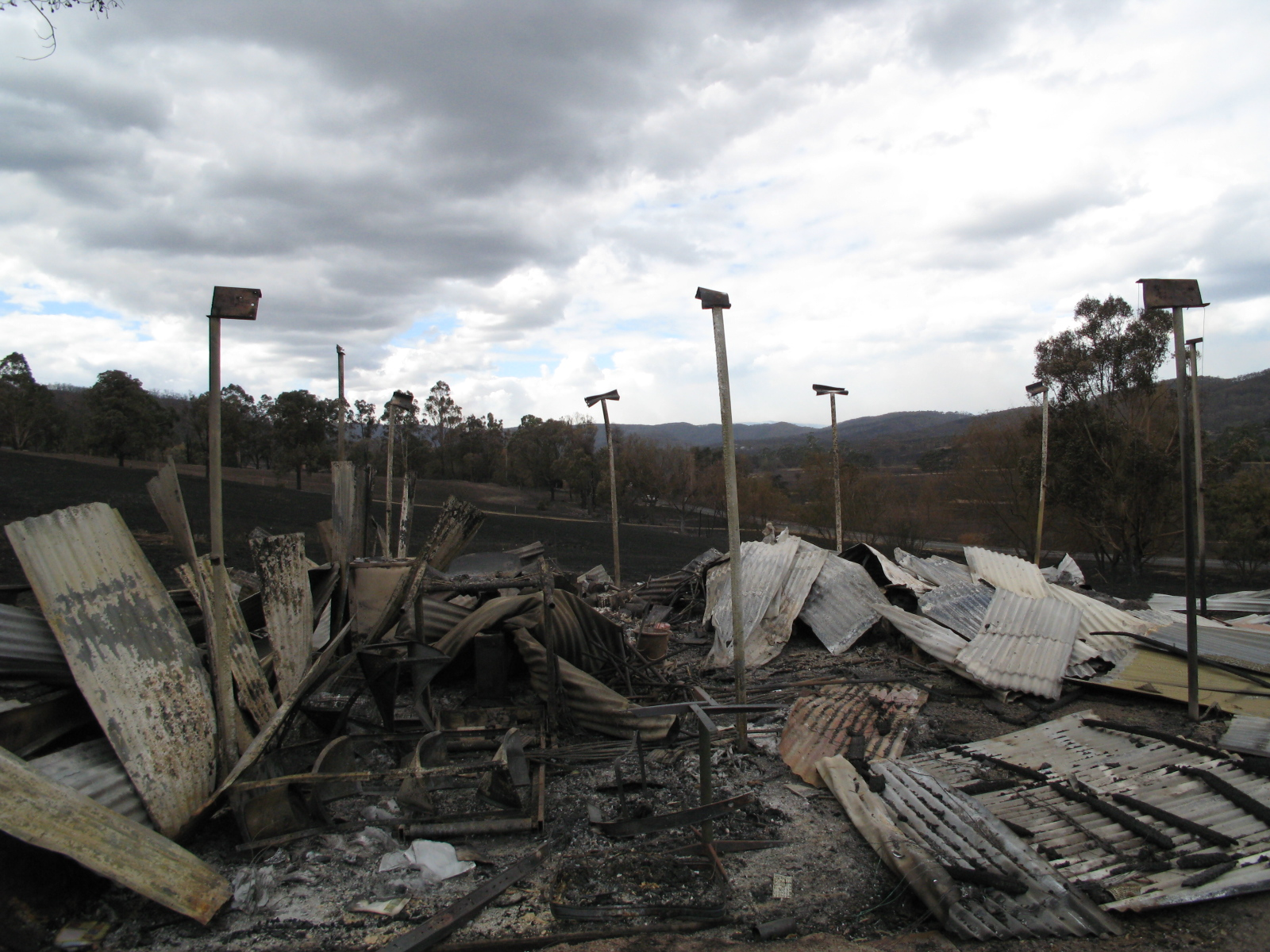
2009 bushfire damage

== See also ==
- Bushfires in Australia
