= Arthurs Creek =

- Town
- Interactive map of Arthurs Creek
- Coordinates: 37°35′S 145°12′E
- Country: Australia
- State: Victoria
- LGA: Shire of Nillumbik
- Location: 47 km (29 mi) N of Melbourne; 10 km (6.2 mi) SE of Whittlesea, Victoria

Government
  - State electorate: Eildon
  - Federal division: McEwen

Population
  - Total: 478 (2021 census)
- Postcode: 3099
Localities around Arthurs Creek
Humevale	Kinglake West	Strathewen
Yan Yean	Arthurs Creek	St Andrews
Doreen	Nutfield	Cottles Bridge

Arthurs Creek is a locality in Victoria, Australia, 33 kilometres north-east of Melbourne's Central Business District, located within the Shire of Nillumbik local government area. Arthurs Creek recorded a population of 478 at the 2021 census.

It is named after Henry Arthur, a member of John Batman's Port Phillip Association and nephew of George Arthur, a governor of Tasmania. Another source says that it was named by the surveyor Thomas Nutt, supposedly because one of his party, a Mr Arthur, died and was buried in this location.

== History ==
The proclamation of the Duffy Land Act in 1862 saw the beginning of the permanent settlement at Arthurs Creek. Arthurs Creek began as a horticultural settlement with numerous orchards, with the Post Office opening on 7 October 1889 (it closed in 1972). After the First World War, cattle and sheep farms replaced orchards as the principal industry. Today, the land-holdings of Arthurs Creek are a mixture of smaller farm properties including vineyards, orchards, and life-style properties.

The township centre of Arthurs Creek consists of the Arthurs Creek Primary School established in 1876, the Mechanic's Institute Hall, the Arthurs Creek & Strathewen CFA Station, and the former Uniting Church built it 1873, which has become the Arthurs Creek Community Centre. There is also a cricket oval known as Ryders Flat Reserve, and the Arthurs Creek Cemetery, formerly known as the 'Hazel Glen Cemetery' which was established by Patrick Reid as a private burial ground for his young wife Agnes (née Hay) who died on 17 May 1847 at the early age of 49. Agnes had expressed a wish to be buried at her favourite picnic spot on the nearby hilltop overlooking the Hazel Glen homestead and former Stewart's Ponds pastoral run.

Members of the local community commenced work on the Mechanics's Institute hall in 1886, and a grand concert and ball to celebrate the official opening was held on the evening of Friday 2 September 1887. A public library was later added.

Historical residents of Arthurs Creek include Frank Dalby Davison, the author of novels such as Man-shy and Dusty. Davison lived on a property called "Folding Hills" from 1951 to 1970.

Arthurs Creek was hit by the Black Saturday bushfires in February 2009. The East Kilmore fire hit parts of Arthurs Creek and adjoining communities of Strathewen, Kinglake and St Andrews.

== Facilities ==
Arthurs Creek Cemetery, first called Linton, was gazetted as a cemetery in 1867.

Arthurs Creek Primary School is situated at 900 Arthurs Creek Road, Arthurs Creek VIC 3099, and is a Prep to Grade 6 school. It was opened in 1876. The school and schoolhouse was burnt in 1962 and a new school was built in 1963.

A Mobile library services Arthurs Creek which is managed by Yarra Plenty Regional Library

The Mechanics Institute Hall is located at 906 Arthurs Creek Road, Arthurs Creek, and is a function room available for hire. It is run and maintained by the Arthurs Creek Hall committee.

== See also ==
- City of Whittlesea – Arthurs Creek was previously within this local government area.
