= Castella, Victoria =

Castella
- Town
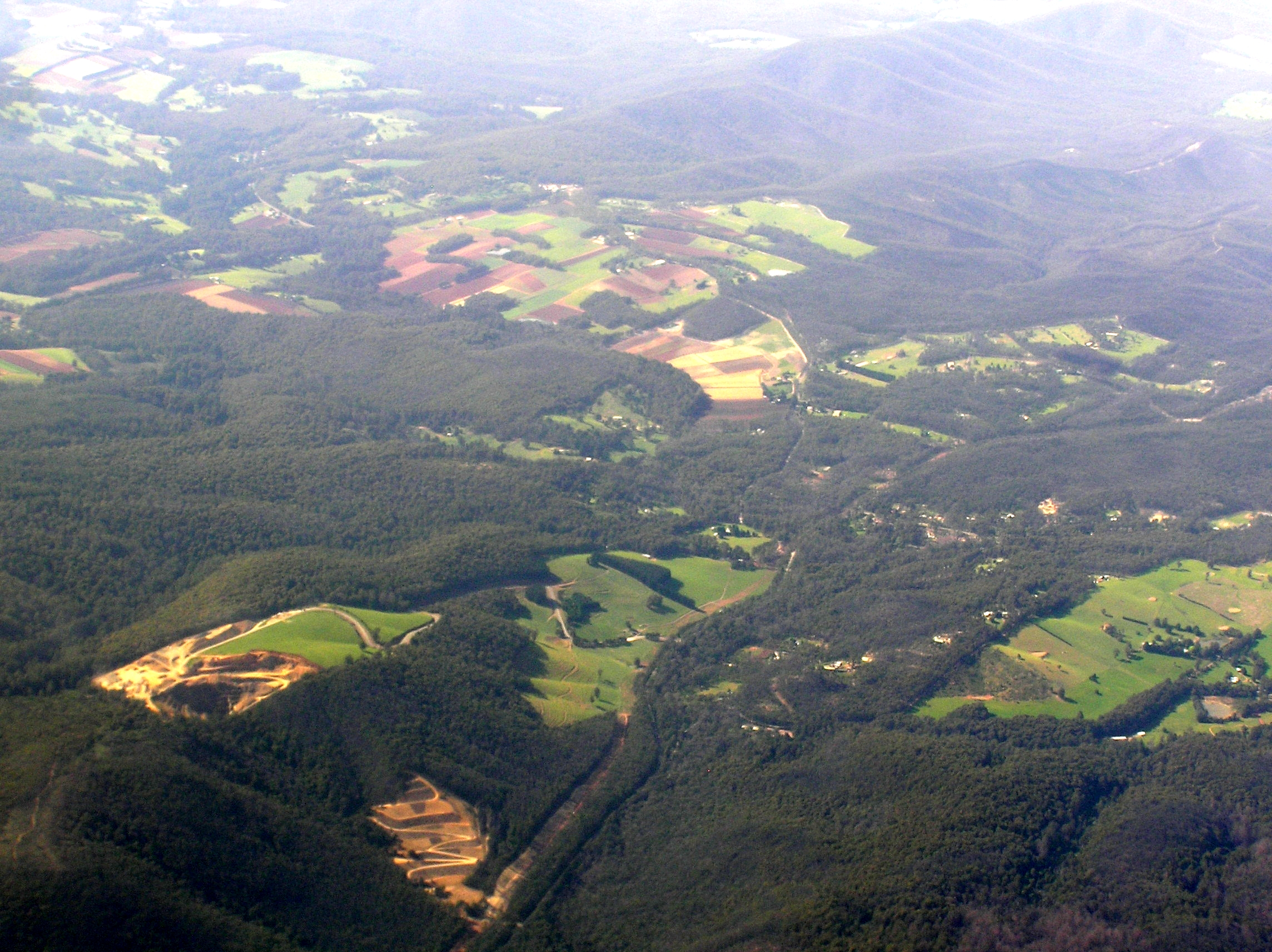
- Aerial view from north

- Coordinates: 37°31′29″S 145°26′00″E
- Country: Australia
- State: Victoria
- Region: Hume
- LGA: Shire of Murrindindi

Government
  - State electorate: Eildon
  - Federal division: Indi

Population
  - Total: 257 (2021 census)
- Postcode: 3777
Localities around Castella
Kinglake National Park
Kinglake	Castella
	Dixons Creek	Toolangi

Castella is a locality in Victoria, Australia. It lies to the east of Kinglake at the intersection of the Melba Highway and the Healesville Kinglake Road.

The Castella Quarries produces sandstone and crushed rock. One of the quarries was used to dump the drillings from a tunnel under the Toolangi State Forest. This tunnel is part of the Sugarloaf Pipeline, carrying freshwater to Melbourne from the Goulburn River.
