= Dixons Creek =

Dixons Creek Victoria
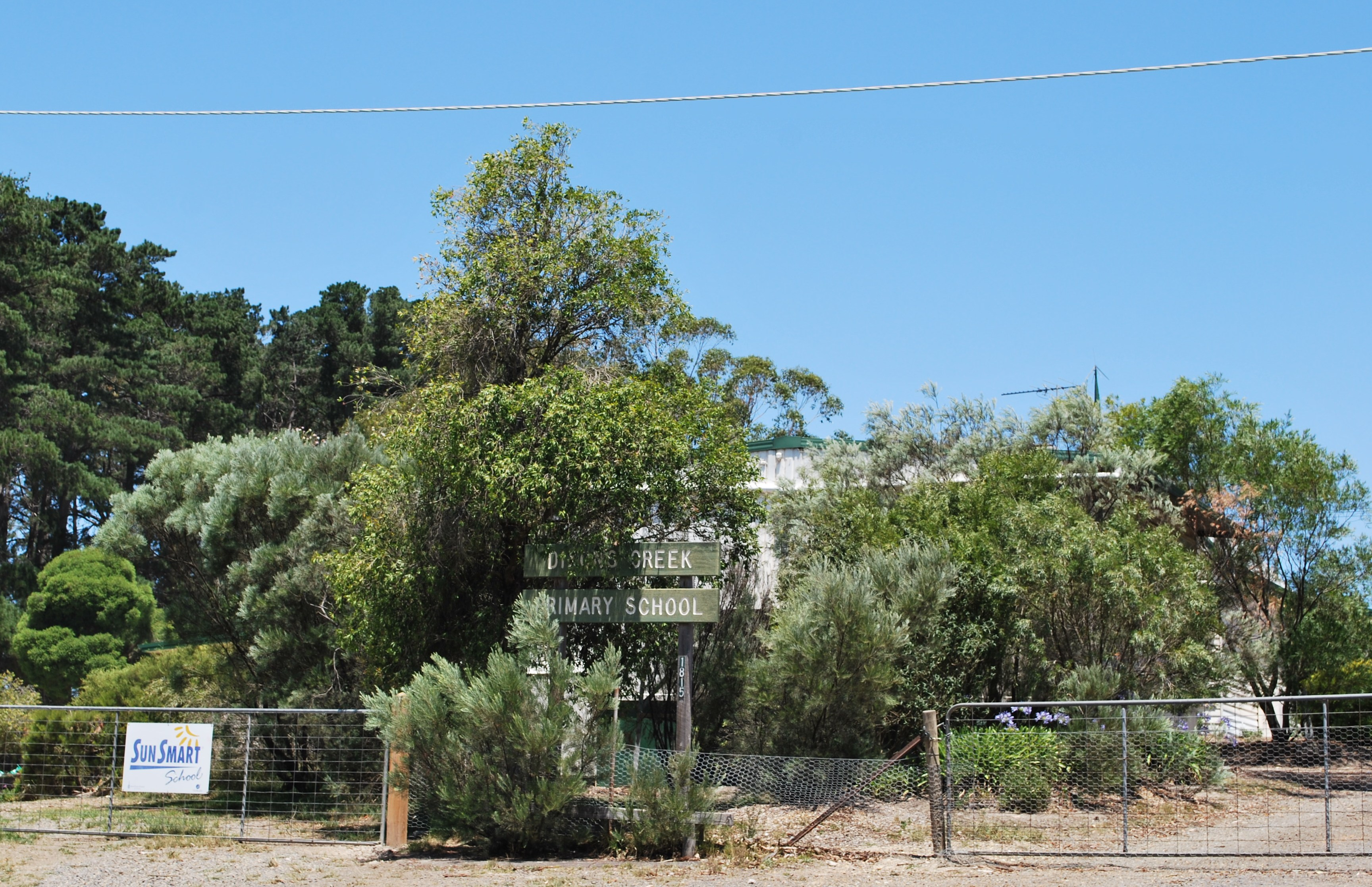
- Primary school

- Coordinates: 37°36′S 145°25′E
- Population: 344 (2021 census)
- Postcode(s): 3775
- Elevation: 160 m (525 ft)
- Location: 46 km (29 mi) from Melbourne; 14 km (9 mi) from Healesville
- LGA(s): Shire of Yarra Ranges
- State electorate(s): Eildon
- Federal division(s): McEwen
Localities around Dixons Creek:
| Kinglake | Castella | Toolangi |
| Steels Creek | Dixons Creek | Chum Creek |
| Yarra Glen | Tarrawarra | Healesville |

Dixons Creek is a town in Victoria, Australia, 46 km north-east of Melbourne's central business district, located within the Shire of Yarra Ranges local government area. Dixons Creek recorded a population of 344 at the 2021 census.

The Post Office opened around 1902 and closed in 1967.

Dixons Creek has a primary school, with currently 7 students. It is part of the Wollombi Cluster (11 small schools in the area).

Dixons Creek was hit hard by the Black Saturday fires and many houses were destroyed.
