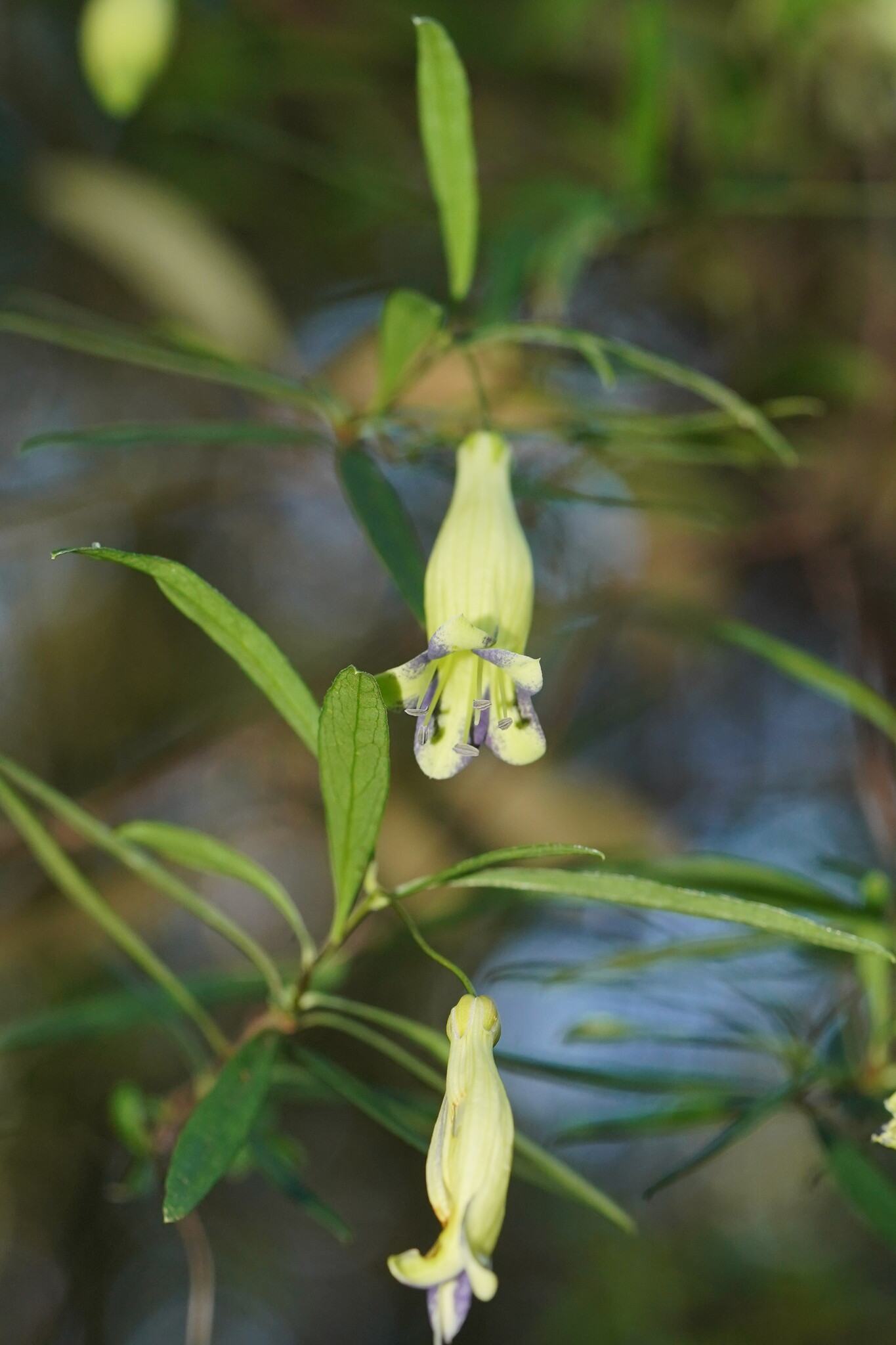
- Near Toolangi

Scientific classification
- Kingdom: Plantae
- Clade: Tracheophytes
- Clade: Angiosperms
- Clade: Eudicots
- Clade: Asterids
- Order: Apiales
- Family: Pittosporaceae
- Genus: Billardiera
- Species: B. macrantha

Binomial name
- Billardiera macrantha Hook.f.
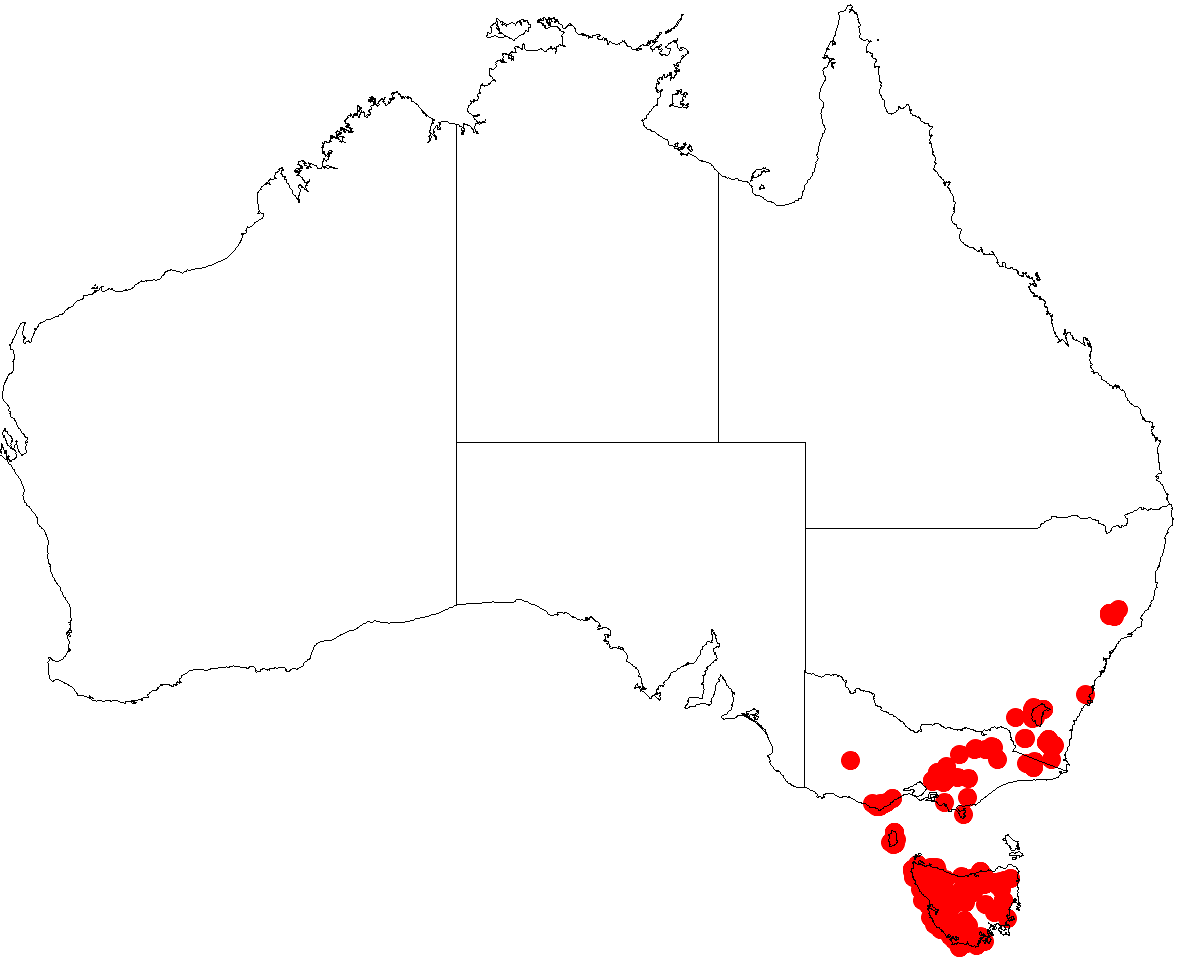
- Occurrence data from Australasian Virtual Herbarium

= Billardiera macrantha =

Species of plant

Billardiera macrantha is a species of flowering plant in the family Pittosporaceae and is endemic to south-eastern Australia. It is a slender twiner with narrowly elliptic leaves and yellowish-green flowers arranged singly on thin, pendent peduncles. This species is often confused with the similar Tasmanian endemic, Billardiera longiflora.

== Description ==
Billardiera macrantha is a slender twiner with shiny brown stems. Its adult leaves are narrowly elliptic, 24–53 mm (0.94–2.09 in) long and 4–8 mm (0.16–0.31 in) wide on a petiole 2–5 mm (0.079–0.197 in) long. The edges of the leaves curve slightly downwards, the upper surface is glossy green and the lower surface paler. The flowers are arranged singly on a thin, pendent peduncle 17–33 mm (0.67–1.30 in) long. The sepals vary in shape, commonly egg-shaped to needle-like, and 3–9 mm (0.12–0.35 in) long. The petals are spatula-shaped, yellowish-green and tinged or spotted with dark blue at the edges, 26–38 mm (1.0–1.5 in) long, the lobes spreading but not curved backwards. Flowering occurs from October to February and the mature fruit is a shiny purple, oval berry 18–20 mm (0.71–0.79 in) long, containing many seeds.

== Taxonomy ==
Billardiera macrantha was first formally described in 1855 by Joseph Dalton Hooker in The botany of the Antarctic voyage of H.M. Discovery ships Erebus and Terror from a specimen collected by Ronald Campbell Gunn. The specific epithet (macrantha) means "large-flowered".

Most species of Billardiera are endemic to a restricted part of Australia, but B. macrantha, as presently circumscribed, has a relatively wide distribution. It is possible that this species is part of a larger species complex.

== Distribution and habitat ==
This twiner grows in tall Nothofagus and eucalypt forest in moist sites at higher altitudes. It occurs on the Northern and Southern Tablelands of New South Wales and the Australian Capital Territory, on the Otways and mountain ranges east of Melbourne and isolated places further west, and in Tasmania.

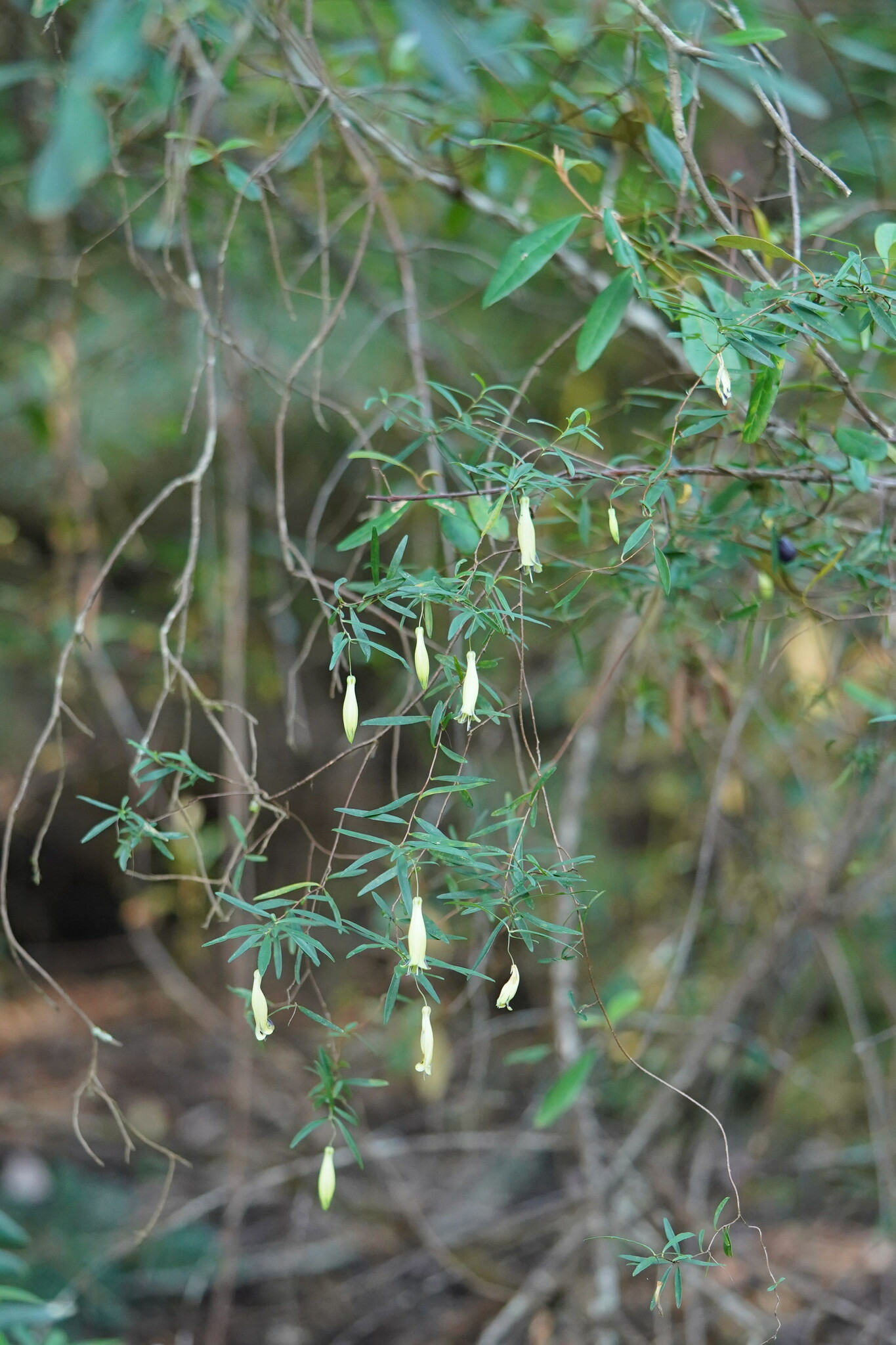
Habit near Toolangi

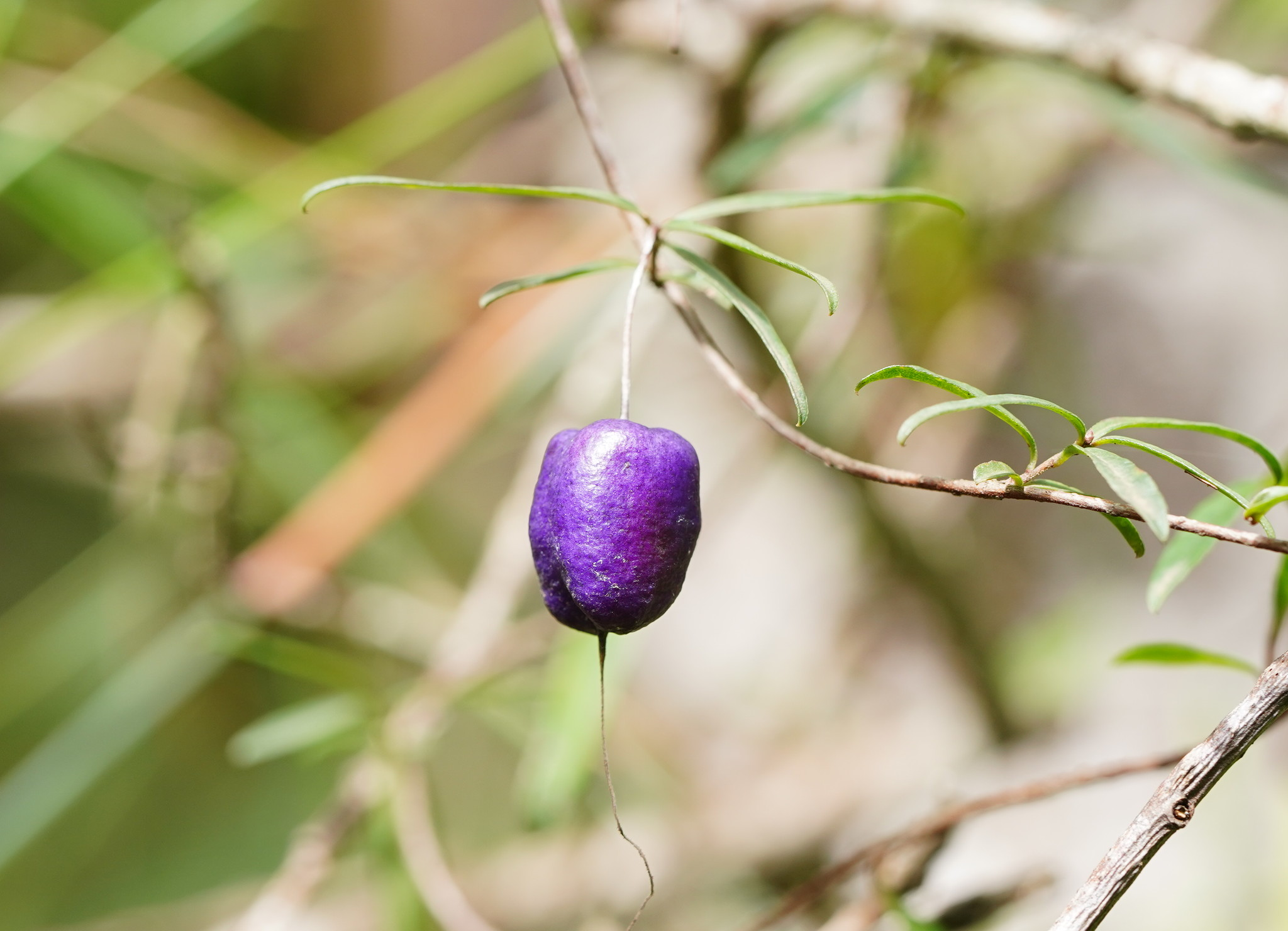
Fruit near Yarra Junction
