= Henry Arthur =

Australian settler

Henry Arthur (1801 – 9 June 1848) was nephew to the fourth lieutenant-governor of Van Diemen's Land, George Arthur. He was an original investor in the Port Phillip Association and was the first European to settle in the area now known as Arthurs Creek, Victoria.

He was born at Plymouth, England and arrived in Van Diemen's Land with his younger brother Charles aged 22, in the retinue of their uncle George Arthur newly appointed Lieutenant-Governor of Van Diemen's Land at Hobart on the 'Adrian' on 12 May 1824. In 1830 he was appointed a justice of the peace and collector of customs with a staff of four officers at Launceston, Van Diemen's Land. He resigned in February 1836 and went next month to Port Phillip (now Melbourne) as an investor in the Port Phillip Association with several hundred sheep.

By February 1836 he and Michael Connolly were reported to have a flock of over 100 sheep at Arthurs Creek, Victoria a sheep run 40 km north of Melbourne he had been granted.

He was a founder of the Melbourne Race Club and acted as its steward in 1838. He became insolvent in 1843 and joined his brother Charles in establishing a sheep run at Mount Schank. Trouble with aboriginals and dingoes, however, drove the Arthur brothers to sell up in 1844.

He died, bankrupt, on 9 June 1848 at Longford, Tasmania.
