= Cottles Bridge =

Cottles Bridge Victoria
- Coordinates: 37°37′19″S 145°13′8″E
- Population: 609 (2021 census)
- Established: 1870s
- Postcode(s): 3099
- Elevation: 152 m (499 ft)
- Location: 30 km (19 mi) from Melbourne; 4 km (2 mi) from Hurstbridge
- LGA(s): Shire of Nillumbik
- State electorate(s): Eildon; Yan Yean
- Federal division(s): McEwen
Localities around Cottles Bridge:
Doreen	Arthurs Creek	St Andrews
Doreen	Cottles Bridge	St Andrews
Hurstbridge	Panton Hill	St Andrews

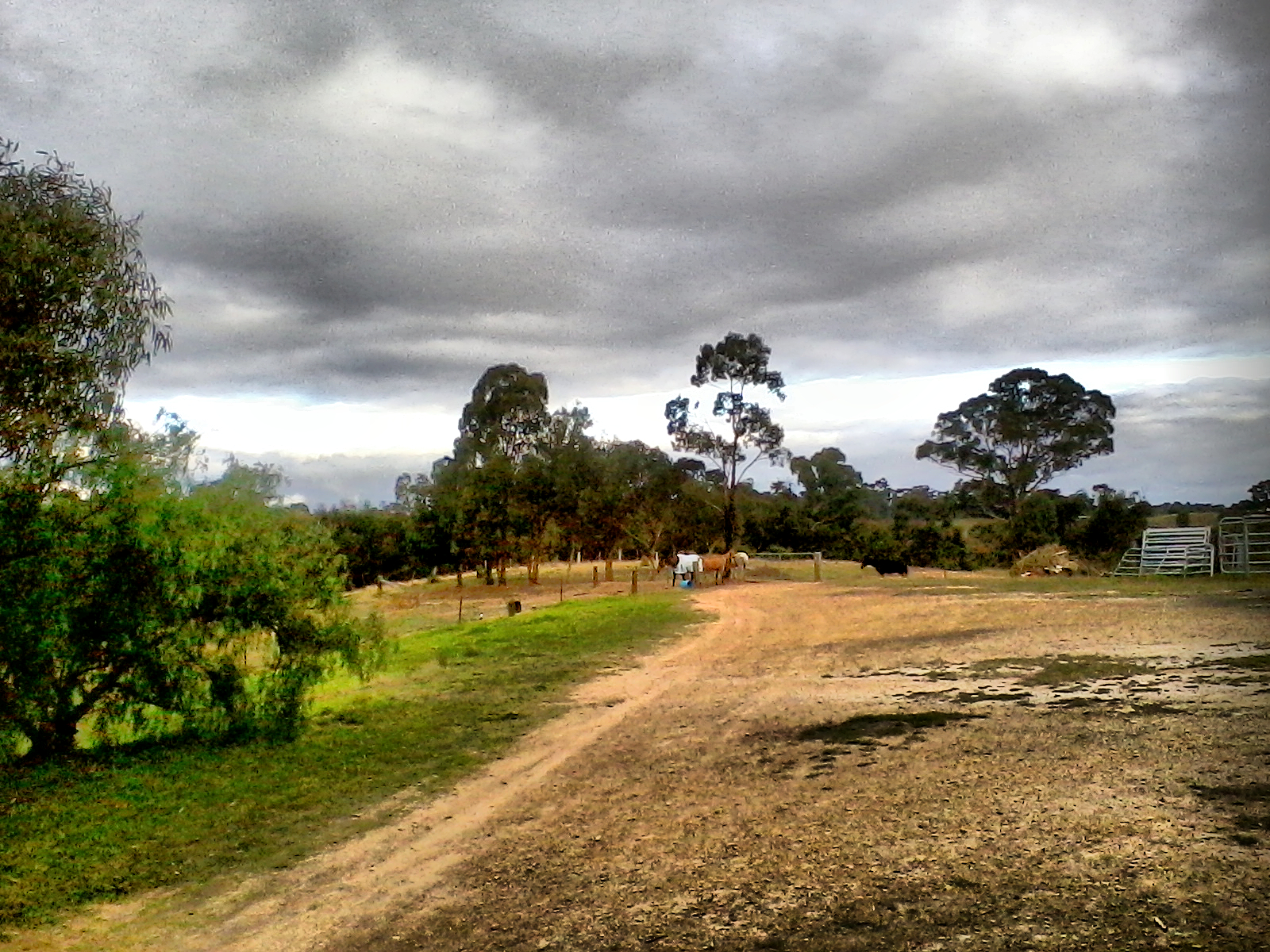
Old farm in Cottle's Bridge near Melbourne

Cottles Bridge is a town in Victoria, Australia, 30 km north-east of Melbourne's central business district, located within the Shire of Nillumbik local government area. Cottles Bridge recorded a population of 609 at the 2021 census.

== History ==
The area, previously known as Back Creek, was named after Thomas Cottle, who settled in the area in the 1870s. Cottle's Bridge Post Office opened on 1 January 1910 and closed in 1960.

The actual Cottles Bridge is located west of St. Andrews in a location that was once full of small farms and orchards

From the 1950s onwards, various artists settled in the area, most notably Clifton Pugh AO, who established the Dunmoochin Artists Society there in 1953.

== Present day ==
Cottles Bridge is home to the Lovegrove Vineyard and Winery, an award-winning Yarra Valley winery which established in 1983 and produces sparkling wines, chardonnay, sauvignon blanc, pinot noir, cabernet and merlot. There is also the Hurstbridge Learning Co-Operative Primary School, a parent-run, alternative school for primary school students established in 1973.

The area is not serviced by Melbourne public transport.

== See also ==
- Shire of Eltham – Cottles Bridge was previously within this former local government area.
