= Disappointment Reference Area =

Nature reserve in Australia

Coordinates: 37°26′11″S 145°9′48″E

Disappointment Reference Area is a scientific reference area within the Wallaby Creek section of Kinglake National Park. It is located in the Central Highlands of the Victoria, Australia, 50 kilometres northeast of Melbourne.

The Disappointment Reference Area, and the nearby Stony Creek and Joey Creek Reference Areas, are assigned the IUCN Category Ia (Strict Nature Reserve) and are managed mainly for scientific purposes

It is named after Mount Disappointment, which is on the north-western boundary of the area.
