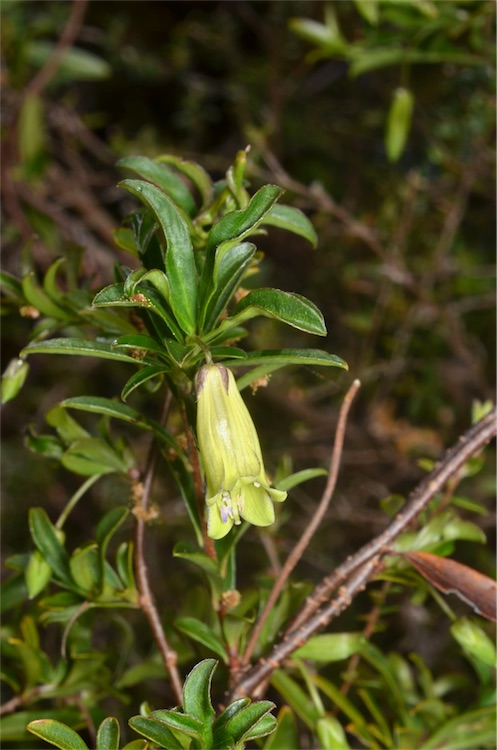

Scientific classification
- Kingdom: Plantae
- Clade: Tracheophytes
- Clade: Angiosperms
- Clade: Eudicots
- Clade: Asterids
- Order: Apiales
- Family: Pittosporaceae
- Genus: Billardiera
- Species: B. longiflora

Binomial name
- Billardiera longiflora Labill.

Synonyms
- Billardiera longiflora subsp. alpina Rodway nom. inval., pro syn.; Billardiera longiflora var. alpina Rodway; Billardiera longiflora Labill. var. longiflora; Labillardiera longiflora (Labill.) Schult.

= Billardiera longiflora =

Purple apple-berry

Species of flowering plant

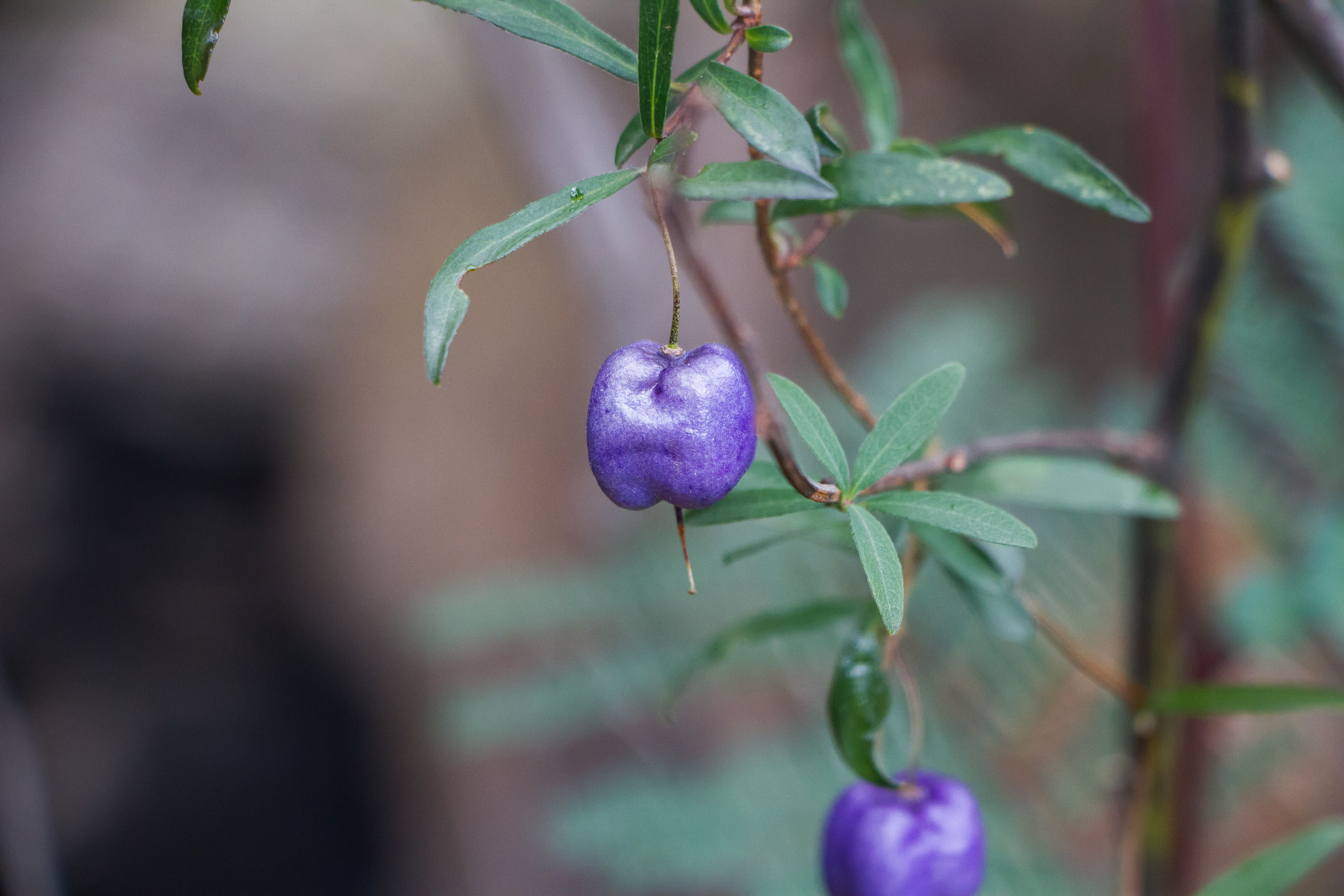
Fruit

Billardiera longiflora is a species of flowering plant in the family Pittosporaceae and is endemic to Tasmania. It is a woody twiner or climber that has variably-shaped, often elliptic leaves, often varying with altitude, and greenish-yellow, pendent, tube-shaped flowers arranged singly and turning blue as they age. This species is often confused with the similar Billardiera macrantha of south-eastern Australia, including Tasmania.

== Description ==
Billardiera longiflora is a woody twiner or climber, its new shoots hairy, but become glabrous with age. Its adult are leaves variably shaped, at lower altitudes, narrowly egg-shaped with the narrower end towards the base, 18–25 mm (0.71–0.98 in) long and 5–6 mm (0.20–0.24 in) wide on a petiole 1–2 mm (0.039–0.079 in) long. At higher altitudes, the leaves are almost linear, 15–35 mm (0.59–1.38 in) long and 2–3 mm (0.079–0.118 in) wide. The flowers are arranged singly on a pendent peduncle 10–14 mm (0.39–0.55 in) long. The sepals are egg-shaped, 3–5 mm (0.12–0.20 in) long and purplish-blue. The petals are 16–24 mm (0.63–0.94 in) long, greenish-yellow, turning blue as they age, and joined at the base, the lobes spreading but not turned back. Flowering mostly occurs in summer and the mature fruit is a glossy purple berry 13–20 mm (0.51–0.79 in) long, the seeds about 1.8 mm (0.071 in) long.

== Taxonomy ==
Billardiera longiflora was first formally described in 1805 by Jacques Labillardière in his Novae Hollandiae Plantarum Specimen. The specific epithet (longiflora) means "long-flowered", but this species has shorter flowers that the more common B. macrantha with which it is often confused.

== Distribution and habitat ==
This species of billardiera only occurs in eucalypt woodland and forest in Tasmania.
