= Toolangi Forest Discovery Centre =

Forest education hub in Victoria, Australia

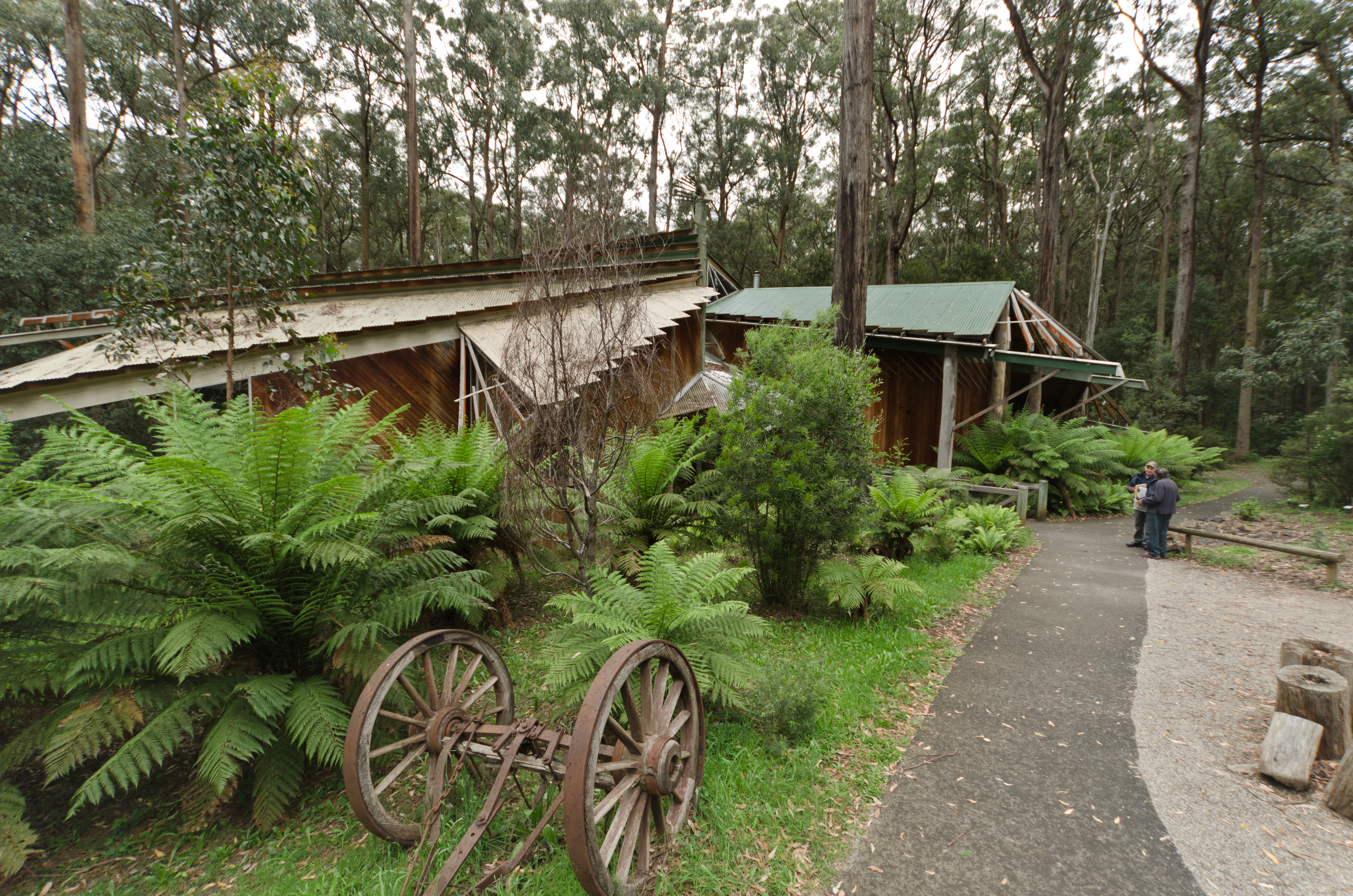
Toolangi Forest Discovery Centre

The Toolangi Forest Discovery Centre (TFDC) is a forest education hub in Toolangi, Victoria, Australia. It was opened by the Victorian Minister for Natural Resources, Geoff Coleman, and the Federal Minister for Resources, David Beddall, to a large crowd of dignitaries on 14 February 1994, but its origins can be traced back many decades earlier.

== History ==
During the late 1960s the Forests Commission Victoria (FCV) started to deliver public information and schools’ education.

Recreation and conservation on State forest was receiving greater focus, and a key moment for the Commission came in August 1970, then under the new chairmanship of Dr Frank Moulds, with the creation of the Forest Recreation Branch.

This initiative was a first for any Australian Forest Service, but its brief soon widened and by 1971 it became the Forest Environment and Recreation (FEAR) Branch under the stewardship of Athol Hodgson, and later Stuart Calder. This move was accompanied with the appointment of some specialist ranger and planning positions in the field.

During the 1970s, local FCV district staff were encouraged to bring school groups into the bush and organise other ad hoc tours. Toolangi developed into an innovative forest education hub under the enthusiastic direction of Rod Incoll, the District Forester, with strong support from the Divisional Forester at Healesville, Ken Harrop.

By the early 1980s, Rod Incoll had convinced the Forests Commission that a modern office and depot complex was needed at Toolangi. The new building included, in-part, the FCV's first purpose-built community education centre.

After the election of the Cain Labor Government in 1982, and the release of the ground breaking Timber Industry Strategy (TIS) later in 1986, the idea of a dedicated forest education centre began to take hold.

In 1990, an education project to produce school curriculum materials was formalised. The group had strong representation from the Victorian Education Department and school teachers.

The materials were deliberately designed to challenge students to think about the complexities, controversies and contradictions of forest and bushfire management, endangered species conservation, timber harvesting and timber sustainability, ecotourism and forest ecosystems. The project also produced the video “Forests of Ash” in 1993.

Meanwhile, several sites for a new education centre were considered including Barmah, Marysville, Macedon, Toolangi, the Dandenong Ranges and the Grampians.

There were some concerns expressed about the TFDC location on the Healesville-Kinglake Road as being “off the beaten track”, and therefore generating limited passing traffic. However, the site had other big advantages of being within two hours of Melbourne schools and sited in an active “working forest” with a rich harvesting and sawmilling history. Toolangi also had proven credentials as being able to deliver education programs.

== The Building ==
The Toolangi Forest Discovery Centre was designed by Victorian Government architect Peter Pass to match its surroundings using many local timbers. It was deliberately nestled into the messmate bush near the Department of Conservation and Natural Resources (DCNR) offices and the cathedral-like building has a roof shape resembling overlapping gum leaves lying gently on the forest floor.

The building was funded with a $1.5m grant from the Federal Government and another $200k being contributed from the State. The ongoing operating costs for teaching staff and building maintenance were to be met by DCNR.

The visionary TFDC project was led by DCNR forester Kevin Wareing as the Head of Forest Commerce Branch, while on-site construction was managed over two of Toolangi's notoriously wet and cold winters by forester John Cunningham. The exhibition design was by Rosemary Simons with many others in support.

Once it became operational the responsibility shifted to Forest Management Branch in Melbourne, headed by David Holmes. A Forest Environment team, led by Mike Leonard, worked closely with the staff at Toolangi and North East Region of DCNR to implement the education programs.

== Forest Education Programs ==
In the early years of the operations of the TFDC, qualified sessional teachers were recruited to run the education programs and it proved a huge success with between 10,000 and 12,000 students each year and many repeat visitors.

A highlight in 1996 was the International Sculpture Festival and the establishment of a trail leading from the centre through the bush.

But sudden departmental funding cuts at the end of 1998 caused the closure of the main TFDC building, although the education programs continued to operate from an adjacent tin shed (AKA the Discovery Tree) under a three-year contract with the Northern Melbourne Institute of TAFE.

At the conclusion of the TAFE arrangement, the forest education programs came back under the department's umbrella using up to 10–12 sessional teachers.

During this period, the main TDFC building was sometimes open on weekends and public holidays, depending on available funding.

In 2003, the Natural Resources Conservation League (NRCL) closed its nursery in Springvale and needed a new home. It leased space at Toolangi, but in 2007 moved to the Waterwheel Centre in Warburton.

Some forest education programs continued until June 2012, when the department announced that forest education was no longer “core business”.

By the beginning of 2013 one of Australia's oldest registered environmental charities, the Gould League, had also been trained to run existing programs at the Discovery Tree, which continue to this day.

== Closure ==
In about 2000 the proprietors of the Toolangi General Store approached the department to convert part of the main building into a coffee shop, the Crosscut Kiosk. The existing staff tearoom was extended and some of the displays were removed to make space for tables. However, the proposal did not ultimately succeed, and the Toolangi Tavern was built instead, next to the site of the general store.

There had been grave fears for the wooden building during the 2009 Black Saturday bushfires when part of the adjoining departmental offices and State forest were destroyed.

Between 2015 and 2018 there was an unsuccessful effort by a community group to establish a Committee of Management under the Crown Lands (Reserves) Act 1978 and revive the main TFDC as a tourist information centre, gallery and Ecology Café.

But critical maintenance of the iconic wooden building had been neglected, and the structure slowly deteriorated, while the costs of repair and restoration to modern building and fire protection standards began to climb into the millions.

Sadly, by August 2018 the Toolangi Forest Discovery Centre once again fell silent. A second Committee of Management was appointed and in 2021 began a planning scheme amendment process with Murrindindi Shire, as well as writing a business case, for the TFDC and the surrounding lands to be more broadly used by the community and for commercial purposes. The land is permanent Crown land and remains in public ownership.

In the meantime (2023), the Toolangi Forest Discovery Centre remains closed leaving a huge void in much needed, hands-on, balanced and factual education materials about forests and bushfires for students and the general public.
