= Whittlesea, Victoria =

Whittlesea
- Town
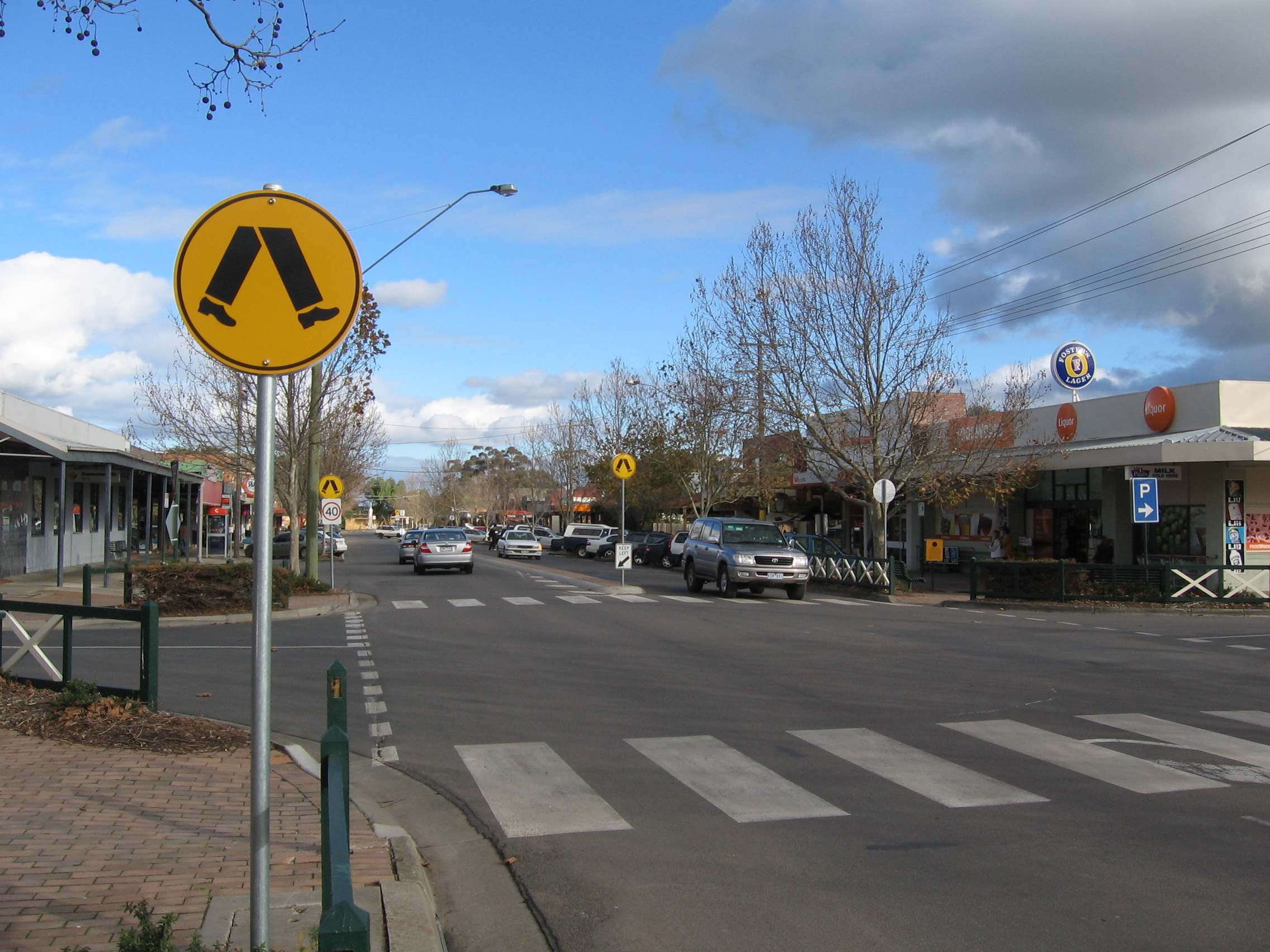
- Church Street

- Interactive map of Whittlesea
- Coordinates: 37°30′50″S 145°06′50″E
- Country: Australia
- State: Victoria
- LGA: City of Whittlesea
- Location: 40 km (25 mi) N of Melbourne; 22 km (14 mi) N of Epping; 20 km (12 mi) SE of Wallan

Government
  - State electorate: Yan Yean
  - Federal division: McEwen
- Elevation: 178 m (584 ft)

Population
  - Total: 6,117 (2021 census)
- Postcode: 3757
Localities around Whittlesea
Upper Plenty	Clonbinane	Kinglake
Eden Park	Whittlesea	Kinglake
Beveridge	Doreen	Arthurs Creek

Whittlesea is a town in Victoria, Australia, 40 kilometres (25 mi) north-east from Melbourne's central business district, located within the City of Whittlesea local government area. Whittlesea recorded a population of 6,117 at the 2021 census.

== History ==
The Post Office opened on 1 September 1853 as Plenty and was renamed Whittlesea in 1864. The town may have been named after Whittlesey, in England. A school opened in a single stone building in 1878 and is to this day the home to Whittlesea Primary School.

The railway to Whittlesea was opened on 23 December 1889 as an extension to what is now the Mernda line, and closed in December 1959.

When the original railway was in operation Whittlesea had a large logging trade, taking the timber from Kinglake, Whittlesea region toward greater Melbourne for milling. There were later two saw mills in operation. At its timber producing peak Whittlesea had several pubs to help house the temporary timber workers.

On 7 February 2009 and subsequent days thereafter, Whittlesea acted as a focal point of for firefighting and relief efforts during the Black Saturday bushfires. In a firefighting context Whittlesea Fire Station and its members play an important role in managing firefighting operations around the Mount Disappointment and Kinglake areas. The township also acted as a focal point for relief efforts, attracting support from the larger Victorian and Australian communities.

== Today ==
Although located only a few kilometres from the outer fringes of metropolitan Melbourne, Whittlesea lies outside the Urban Growth Boundaries of the Melbourne 2030 metropolitan development plan. It is therefore expected to maintain its status as a separate town until 2030 and beyond. City of Whittlesea planning policy for Whittlesea township envisages minimal growth over the next decade so that the township will retain its rural character.

The town has a local volunteer (CFA) fire brigade and a limited hours Police station. On 22 January 2009, an ambulance station was opened in Whittlesea.

Local attractions include the Funfields Theme Park, Toorourrong Reservoir, Yan Yean Reservoir, Bear's Castle and the Courthouse and Visitor Information Centre.

== Organisations ==
The Town Crier magazine is produced monthly and distributed within the township of Whittlesea and surrounding areas. It was established in 1986.

Whittlesea Show began in 1859 and is managed by the Whittlesea Agricultural Society.

Whittlesea Library (managed by Yarra Plenty Regional Library) can be found in the Whittlesea Community Activity Centre.

=== Clubs and societies ===
The following clubs and societies can also be found in Whittlesea:

- Whittlesea Lions
- Whittlesea Masonic Lodge. It was established in November 1919 and has almost 100 years of continuous service
- Whittlesea Rotary
- Whittlesea U3A

== Education ==
- Whittlesea Kindergarten
- Whittlesea Secondary College
- Whittlesea Primary School
- St. Mary's Catholic Parish Primary School
- Whittlesea Community Garden

== Sport ==
In 1866, it was gazetted that a ground (now known as A.F. Walker Reserve, corner Laurel and Forest Streets) will be used primarily for the game of cricket. Whittlesea Cricket Club was formed, and is the longest-serving community sports club in the township. In the 2016/17 season, the club celebrated its 150th anniversary. It currently plays in the Diamond Valley Cricket Association, with representation from seniors, juniors (boys/girls) and veterans (over 40s).

Whittlesea Football Club, an Australian Rules football team, competes in the Northern Football League.

Golfers play at the golf course at the Whittlesea Country Club on Humevale Road in neighbouring Humevale.

Whittlesea Tennis Club on Laurel Street competes in the Northern district, Diamond Valley Leagues.

A tennis club was set up early on by local Residents (Laurel Street). A pivotal person helping to establish and develop this was a Mr Jack (John Alfred) Wailes who also helped establish the Whittlesea Golf Course as a privately run entity. Laural street (now cricket club) was also the original site of the famous Rural Whittlesea Agricultural show.

There are also the following sporting/ social clubs: Australian Rules Football Club, Bowls Club, Scouts, Masons, Golf Club (new - Growling Frog), Pony Club, Basketball, Motorbike Club c/o K&J Thomas.

A team also represents Whittlesea in Darts. It participates in the Northern Darts Association (N.D.A.) at the Royal Mail Hotel (The Royals). The team is currently participating in C Grade of the N.D.A.

== Whittlesea Fire Brigade ==
Whittlesea Fire Brigade is the local branch of the Country Fire Authority or CFA, and serves the township as well as surrounding communities. It was established on 17 December 1926. On 16 October 2008 the brigade celebrated 60 years since the formation of the Whittlesea Urban Fire Brigade. Earlier in that year the brigade celebrated winning the C aggregate and the Victorian State Urban Championships held on the long weekend in March.

== Notable people ==
- Brittany Beattie - fashion model
