= Toolangi =

- Town
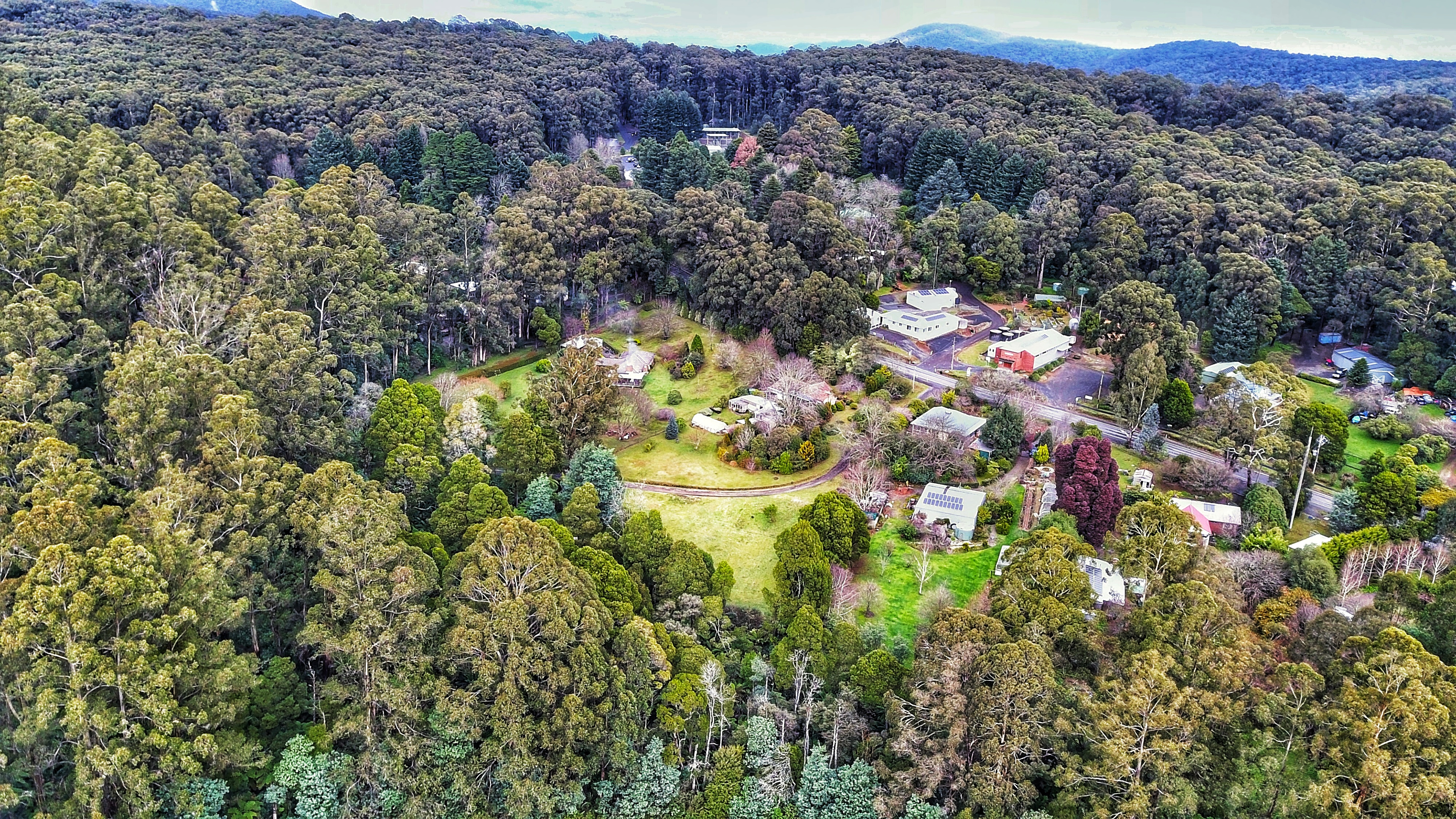
- Toolangi township from the air in June 2020

- Interactive map of Toolangi
- Coordinates: 37°32′S 145°28′E
- Country: Australia
- State: Victoria
- Region: Hume
- LGAs: Shire of Murrindindi; Shire of Yarra Ranges
- Location: 73 km (45 mi) NE of Melbourne; 21 km (13 mi) N of Healesville; 16 km (9.9 mi) E of Kinglake

Government
  - State electorate: Eildon
  - Federal division: Indi
- Elevation: 595 m (1,952 ft)

Population
  - Total: 366 (2021 census)
- Postcode: 3777
- Mean max temp: 15.8 °C (60.4 °F)
- Mean min temp: 7.5 °C (45.5 °F)
- Annual rainfall: 1,359.1 mm (53.51 in)
Localities around Toolangi
Glenburn	Glenburn	Limestone
Kinglake	Toolangi	Narbethong
St Andrews	Dixons Creek	Chum Creek

Toolangi is a locality in Victoria, Australia. At the 2021 census, Toolangi had a population of 366. It is situated on the edge of the Toolangi State Forest.

== History ==
Toolangi is the Taungurung word for stringybark. It is believed the area was known as Mt Rose by European settlers up until the 1890s. European settlers first inhabited Toolangi in the 1860s by paling splitters and then timber cutters, who camped deep in the bush. They were attracted by the huge stands of mountain ash (Eucalyptus regnans), a tree that splits easily, and the messmate timber, which proved durable as a building material.

Toolangi Post Office opened on 1 August 1900 and closed in 1974.

Toolangi Bushfire, January 1939

Toolangi was affected by bushfires in January 1939, with the local Crusader Union of Victoria campsite being evacuated. Two Forestry Commission officers, James Barling and Charles Demby, were killed by the blaze.

Toolangi Football Club entered a side in the Yarra Valley Football League Reserves competition in 1952 and 1953.

It was not until the early 1960s that electricity came to Toolangi. Together with the opening of the Melba Highway, this created the impetus for industrial expansion in the area. An early development was the Potato Research Station (1945), which was followed by the Strawberry Certification Scheme.

On 7 February 2009, the Black Saturday bushfires reached Toolangi and led to two deaths and 18 homes burnt. Fire surrounded the town for weeks and the whole area was quarantined for three weeks. The township itself and a small segment of forest in the Toolangi State Forest to the east of the town survived.

== Attractions ==
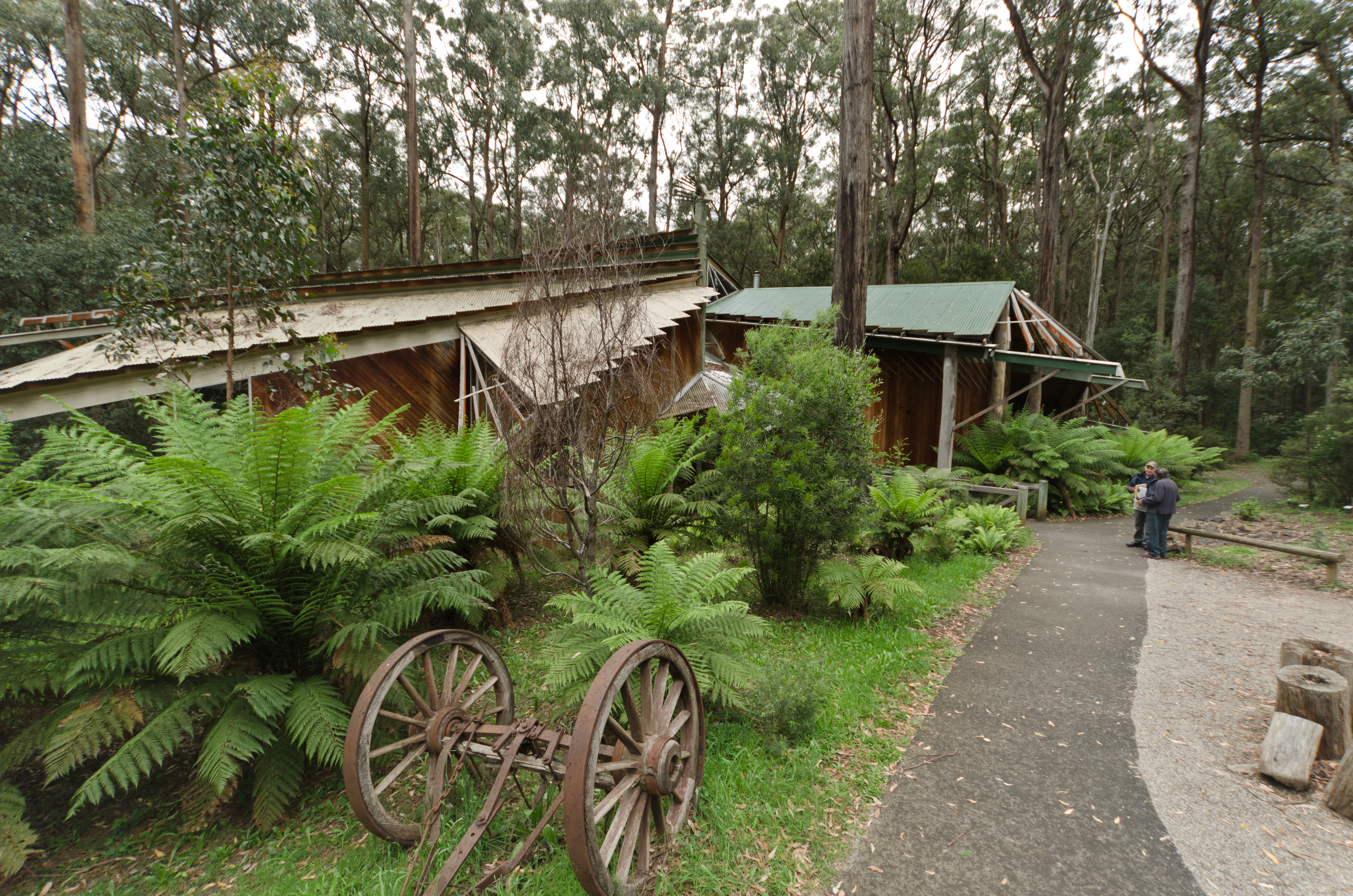
The outside of Toolangi Forest Discovery Centre, nestled amongst trees

A strangely-shaped wooden building surrounded by tall eucalypts is visible when driving through the town. This is the former Toolangi Forest Discovery Centre. This building was used for forest education, and thousands of primary, secondary and tertiary students visited every year. The Discovery Centre and education programs was run by the Department of Sustainability and Environment (DSE), however it was closed on 30 June 2012 due to difficulty in compliance with building requirements in bushfire-prone areas. With endorsement from DSE, long time environmental education specialists Gould League now conduct the same forest education programs, with previous DSE staff, simply without the use of the building.

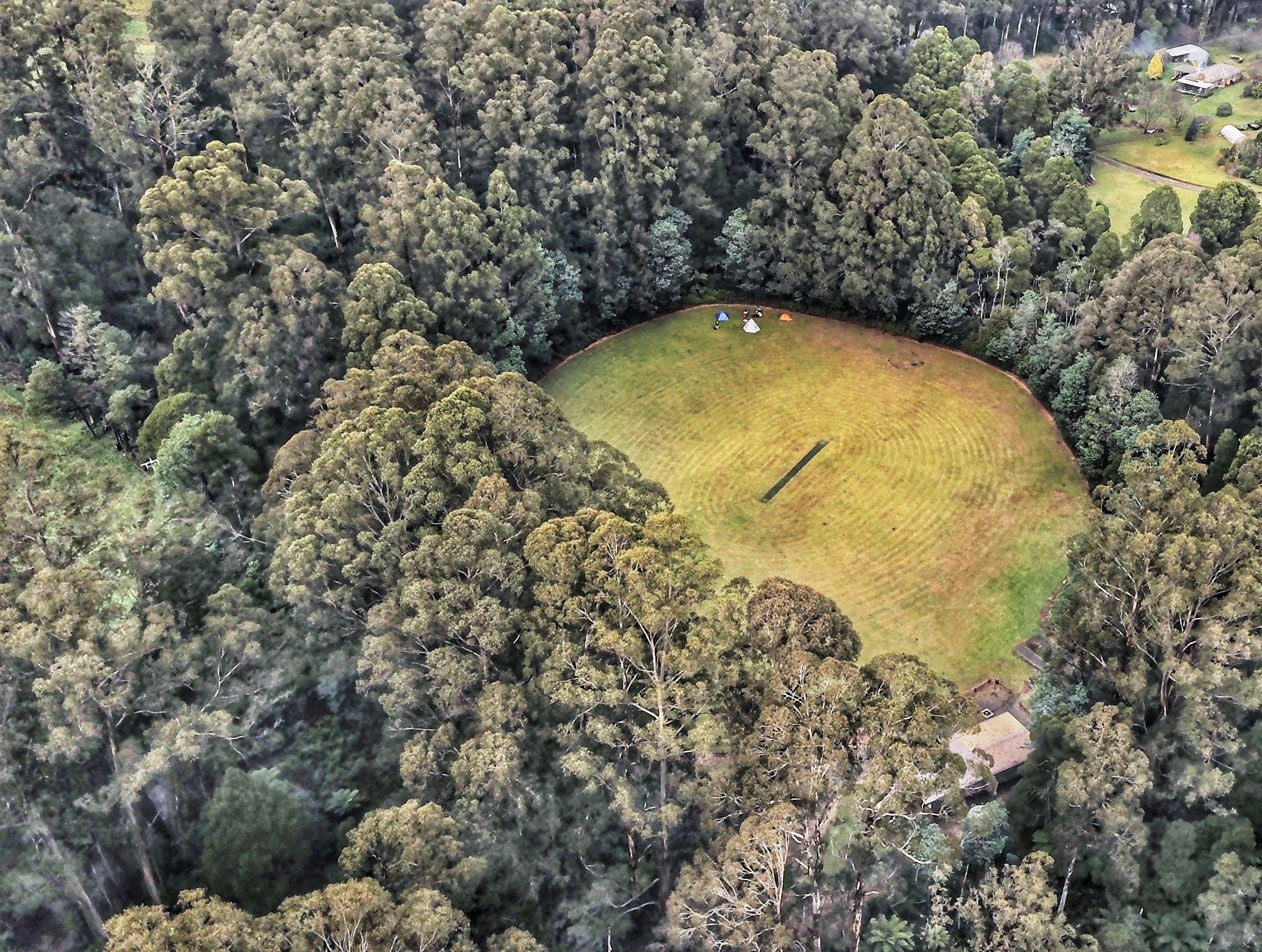
Toolangi from the air in June 2020

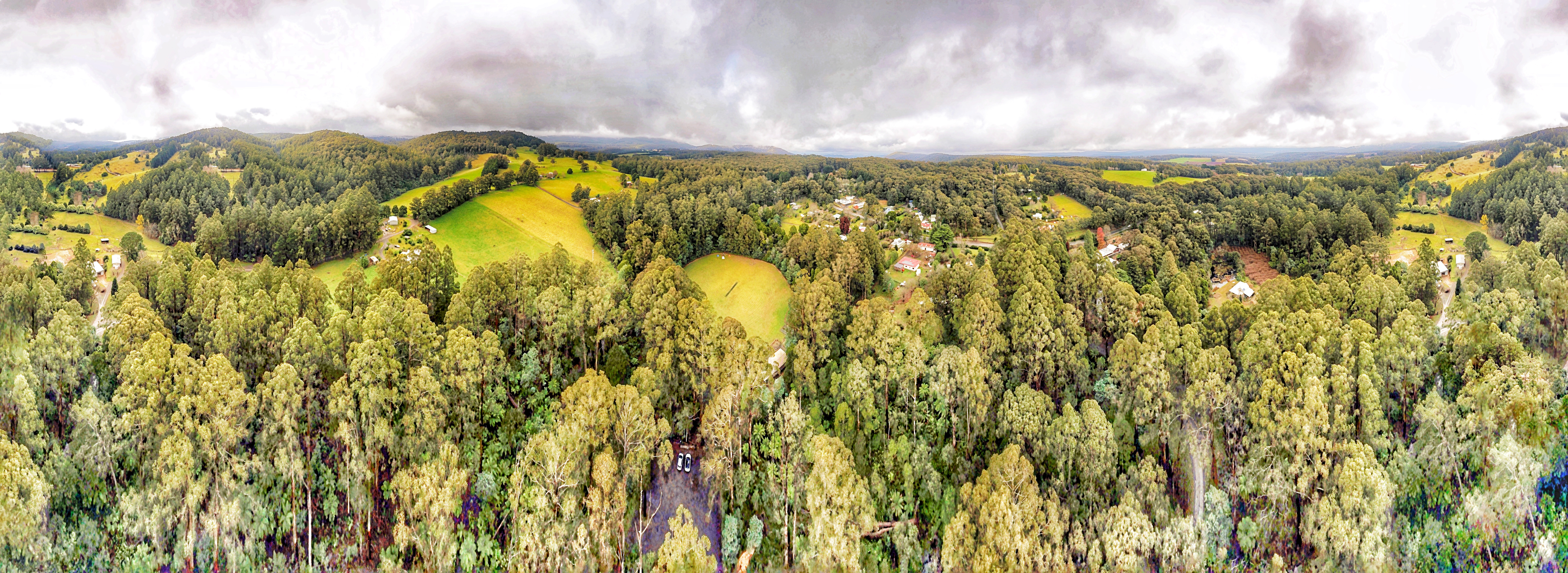
Toolangi from the air in June 2020

There are several local walking tracks, which are detailed in information available at the centre, including the Wirra Willa Rain forest walk through local rainforest, the Yea River Walk opposite the centre, and the Forest Sculpture Trail, which takes in nine works by sculptors of international repute and views both of Melbourne and the district. Mount St Leonard is 5 km. to the south-east.

Toolangi was the home of the poet C. J. Dennis, the author of The Songs of a Sentimental Bloke, Jim of the Hills, The Glugs of Gosh, Rose of Spadgers, The Singing Gardens and Ginger Mick, to name a few. Dennis joined artist Hal Waugh on an expedition to Toolangi in 1908. Dennis stayed on after the expedition, attracted by the ambience of the area, he was also a business partner in one of the many sawmills of the area—St Leonards Sawmill. His work captured the feel of the bush and the Australian characters, both of the bush and the pubs. In 1915, he purchased 3.5 acres (14,000 m^{2}) for 22 pounds. This included a mill house. Over a period of 10 years, with the help of a local handyman, they converted the mill house to a two-storey house named "Arden". His house has long since burned down, but his gardens remain in the care of Jan and Vic Williams, where they operate their tea rooms, The Singing Gardens, and are open to the public.

Opposite the gardens is the pottery of David Williams, who creates unique crystalline-glazed ceramics, which have been exhibited in the National Gallery of Victoria.

The former Toolangi Hotel burned to the ground in 1975. While the building was totally destroyed, the locals saved the beer. For weeks afterwards, they would gather under the trees at the old pub site and assist in depleting the stocks. The former licensee decided not to rebuild the pub and the town remained publess for decades.

== Climate ==
Toolangi has a cold rainforest climate, significantly cooler and wetter than Melbourne due to elevation (of 595 metres) and being outside of the Yarra rainshadow; with annual cloud cover resembling that of Southern England in the British Isles and the Pacific Northwest of North America, more than the typical Victorian climate. Receiving only 1,842 sun hours annually, it is the cloudiest site in mainland Australia.

Climate data for Toolangi (Mount St Leonard DPI, 1953–2006); 595 m AMSL; 37.57° S, 145.50° E
Month	Jan	Feb	Mar	Apr	May	Jun	Jul	Aug	Sep	Oct	Nov	Dec	Year
Record high °C (°F)	42.0 (107.6)	38.6 (101.5)	37.5 (99.5)	28.0 (82.4)	21.9 (71.4)	17.9 (64.2)	18.5 (65.3)	19.5 (67.1)	24.5 (76.1)	29.7 (85.5)	34.9 (94.8)	38.5 (101.3)	42.0 (107.6)
Mean daily maximum °C (°F)	22.7 (72.9)	23.2 (73.8)	20.4 (68.7)	16.1 (61.0)	12.3 (54.1)	9.5 (49.1)	8.6 (47.5)	9.8 (49.6)	12.3 (54.1)	15.4 (59.7)	18.0 (64.4)	20.8 (69.4)	15.8 (60.4)
Mean daily minimum °C (°F)	10.9 (51.6)	11.8 (53.2)	10.6 (51.1)	8.7 (47.7)	6.8 (44.2)	4.7 (40.5)	3.8 (38.8)	4.1 (39.4)	5.2 (41.4)	6.6 (43.9)	7.7 (45.9)	9.5 (49.1)	7.5 (45.6)
Record low °C (°F)	2.7 (36.9)	3.0 (37.4)	2.2 (36.0)	0.5 (32.9)	−1.0 (30.2)	−2.2 (28.0)	−2.5 (27.5)	−5.0 (23.0)	−4.1 (24.6)	−0.6 (30.9)	0.4 (32.7)	2.2 (36.0)	−5.0 (23.0)
Average precipitation mm (inches)	87.7 (3.45)	73.4 (2.89)	84.9 (3.34)	106.1 (4.18)	122.2 (4.81)	111.4 (4.39)	117.7 (4.63)	136.6 (5.38)	134.4 (5.29)	127.0 (5.00)	126.8 (4.99)	116.6 (4.59)	1,359.1 (53.51)
Average precipitation days (≥ 0.2 mm)	11.3	9.1	12.3	12.4	16.7	17.4	19.4	19.2	16.8	16.0	14.0	12.5	177.1
Mean monthly sunshine hours	232.5	217.5	189.1	150.0	102.3	78.0	83.7	105.4	126.0	170.5	189.0	198.4	1,842.4
Source: Toolangi (Mount St Leonard DPI, 1953–2006)
