= Humevale =

- Town
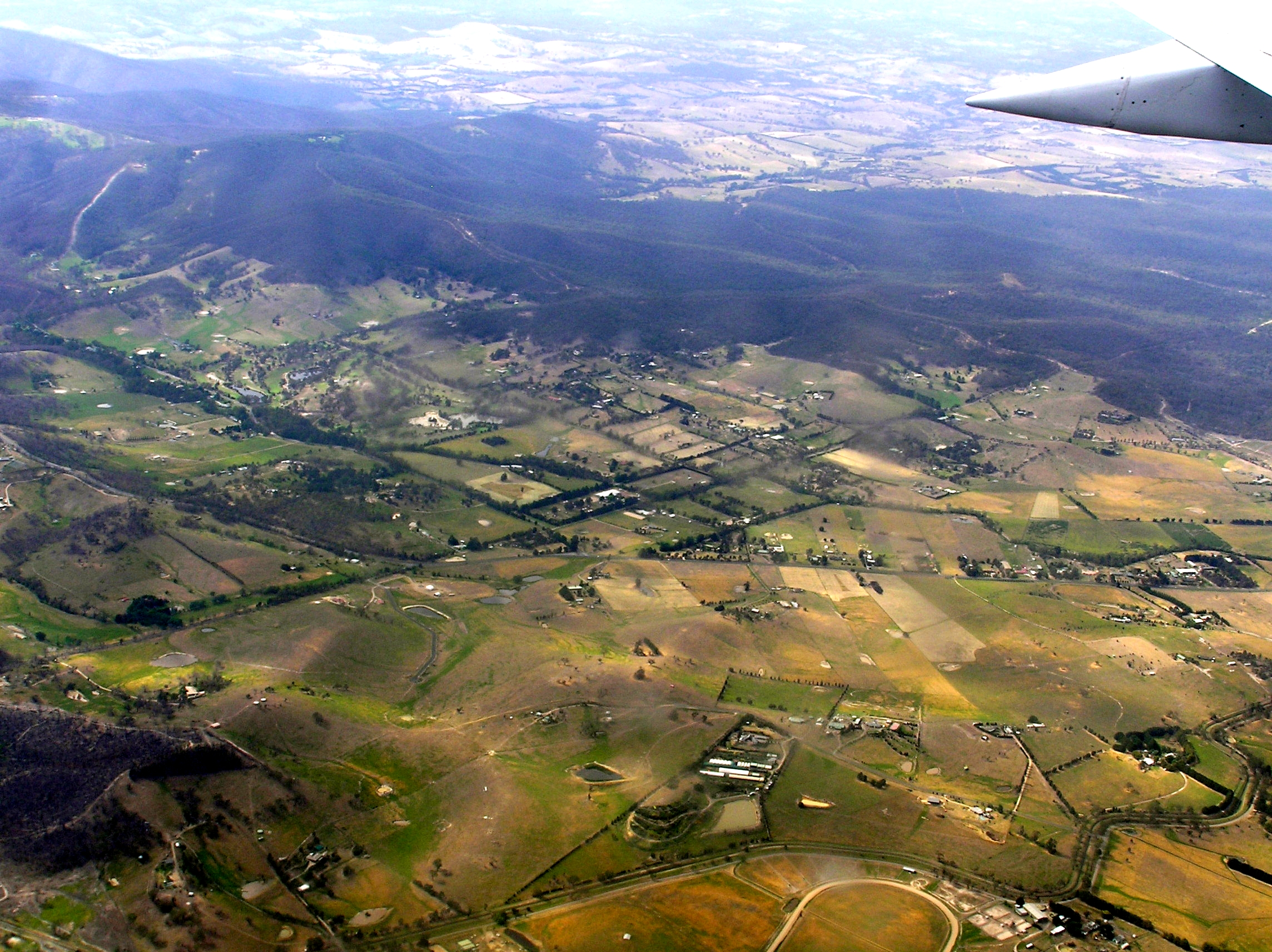
- Aerial view of Humevale from the north-west

- Interactive map of Humevale
- Coordinates: 37.497°S 145.175°E
- Country: Australia
- State: Victoria
- LGA: City of Whittlesea
- Location: 39 km (24 mi) NE of Melbourne; 5 km (3.1 mi) NE of Whittlesea
- Established: 1920s

Government
  - State electorates: Yan Yean; Eildon
  - Federal division: McEwen

Population
  - Total: 352 (SAL 2021)
- Postcode: 3757

Humevale is a locality in Victoria, Australia, 39 km (24 mi) north-east of Melbourne's Central Business District, located within the City of Whittlesea local government area. Humevale recorded a population of 352 at the 2021 census.

== History ==
Located between Whittlesea and Kinglake West, Humevale was originally named Scrubby Creek, after a nearby watercourse. It was renamed Humevale in the 1920s by second-generation settlers, and was named after explorer Hamilton Hume, who explored nearby Mount Disappointment in 1824.

The area was originally worked by paling splitters and tenant farmers, who worked in the nearby Mount Disappointment range. In 1894, the area was subdivided into small farms and a village settlement, as part of a government closer settlement scheme. A number of orchards existed in the area until the 1930s, when they were replaced by livestock grazing.

The Post Office opened around 1902 as Scrubby Creek, was renamed Humevale in 1927, and closed in 1959. A school existed in the area from 1898 until 1968.

== Transport ==
=== Bus ===
One bus route service Humevale:

- 384 : Kinglake – Whittlesea via Humevale. Operated by Dysons.
