= Strathewen =

- Town
- Interactive map of Strathewen
- Coordinates: 37°33′S 145°16′E
- Country: Australia
- State: Victoria
- LGA: Shire of Nillumbik
- Location: 45 km (28 mi) NE of Melbourne; 10 km (6.2 mi) SW of Kinglake

Government
  - State electorate: Eildon
- Elevation: 200 m (660 ft)

Population
  - Total: 198 (2021 census)
- Postcode: 3099
- Mean max temp: 20.2 °C (68.4 °F)
- Mean min temp: 7.2 °C (45.0 °F)
- Annual rainfall: 703 mm (27.7 in)
Localities around Strathewen
Kinglake West	Kinglake West	Kinglake
Kinglake West	Strathewen	Kinglake
Arthurs Creek	St Andrews	St Andrews

Strathewen is a town in Victoria, Australia, 45 km north-east of Melbourne's Central Business District, located within the Shire of Nillumbik local government area. Strathewen recorded a population of 198 at the 2021 census.

Strathewen is located near the Kinglake National Park. It is an apple and pear producing area and is home to small local vineyards and wineries.

Strathewen was badly damaged in the Black Saturday bushfires.

== History ==
Strathewen Post Office opened on 20 September 1909 and closed in 1964.

The town was substantially destroyed during the Black Saturday bushfires on 7 February 2009, which destroyed the primary school, the old fire station, the community hall, and most of the homes in the town. 27 of Strathewen's 200 residents died in the fires.

== See also ==
- Shire of Eltham – the former local government area of which Strathewen was a part
