= St Andrews, Victoria =

St Andrews
- Town
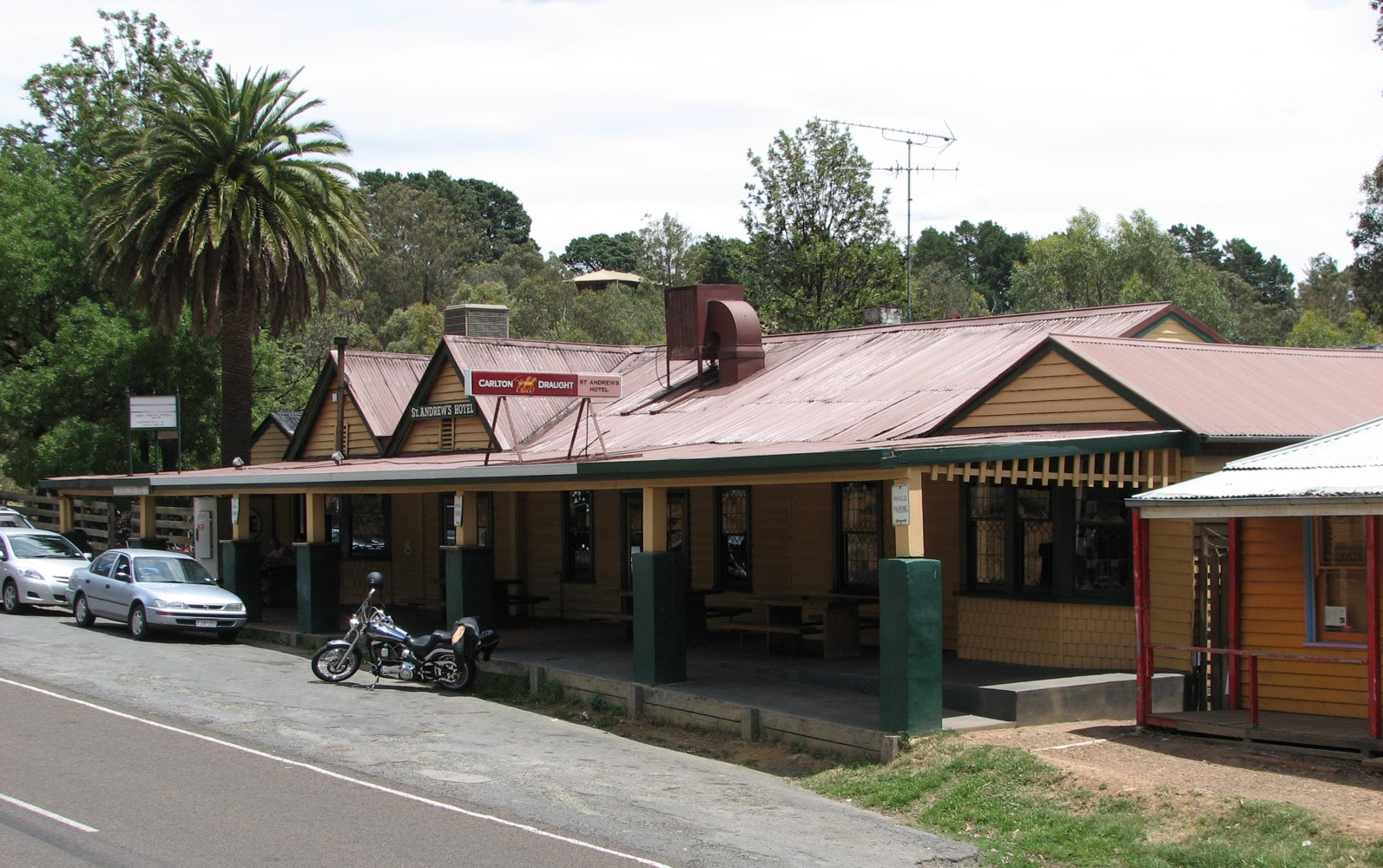
- St Andrews Hotel

- Interactive map of St Andrews
- Coordinates: 37.594°S 145.269°E
- Country: Australia
- State: Victoria
- LGA: Shire of Nillumbik
- Location: 46 km (29 mi) from Melbourne; 10 km (6.2 mi) from Hurstbridge

Government
  - State electorate: Eildon
  - Federal divisions: McEwen; Casey
- Elevation: 209 m (686 ft)

Population
  - Total: 1,186 (2021 census)
- Postcode: 3761
Localities around St Andrews
Strathewen	Kinglake	Kinglake
Arthurs Creek	St Andrews	Yarra Glen
Cottles Bridge	Smiths Gully	Christmas Hills

St Andrews is a town in Victoria, Australia, 52 km north-east of Melbourne's Central Business District, located within the Shire of Nillumbik local government area. St Andrews recorded a population of 1,186 at the 2021 census.

St Andrews is well known for its alternative market, which is open every Saturday from 8am to 2pm except total fire ban days. It also contains a hotel, primary school, bakery, CFA, general store and the Wadambuk community centre where a mobile library managed by Yarra Plenty Regional Library has a regular scheduled stop.

== History ==
Originally called Queenstown, the area was surveyed in 1858 and proclaimed a town on 25 February 1861. Located between Panton Hill and Kinglake, by 1865 it was also known as St Andrews, and the presence of large numbers of Scottish miners gave rise to the town being called both ‘Caledonia’ and ‘St Andrews’.

St Andrew Post Office had opened earlier on 1 January 1856 and was renamed St Andrews in 1923.

It experienced population growth during the Victorian gold rush, when prospectors mined the hills around the town. St Andrews was the earliest goldfield in the area and by 1855 there were 3000 miners. The first discovery of gold in Queenstown was recorded in The Herald on 9 and 11 March 1855 and was attributed to a George Boston and two Scotsmen.

=== Bushfires ===
On 7 February 2009 a major bushfire destroyed houses on Ninks, Muller, Jacksons and Wild Dog Creek Roads, as well as Buttermans Track and Olives Lane. Its progression toward the town centre was halted by a southerly wind change, which saved the rest of the town, but drove the fire front further east, destroying the towns of Kinglake and Marysville.

== Facilities ==
A mobile library service managed by Yarra Plenty Regional Library stops weekly at the Wadamuk Community Centre.

== Notable residents ==
- Ross Noble
- Reg Evans

== See also ==
- Shire of Eltham – St Andrews was previously within this former local government area.
