= Kinglake, Victoria =

Kinglake
- Town
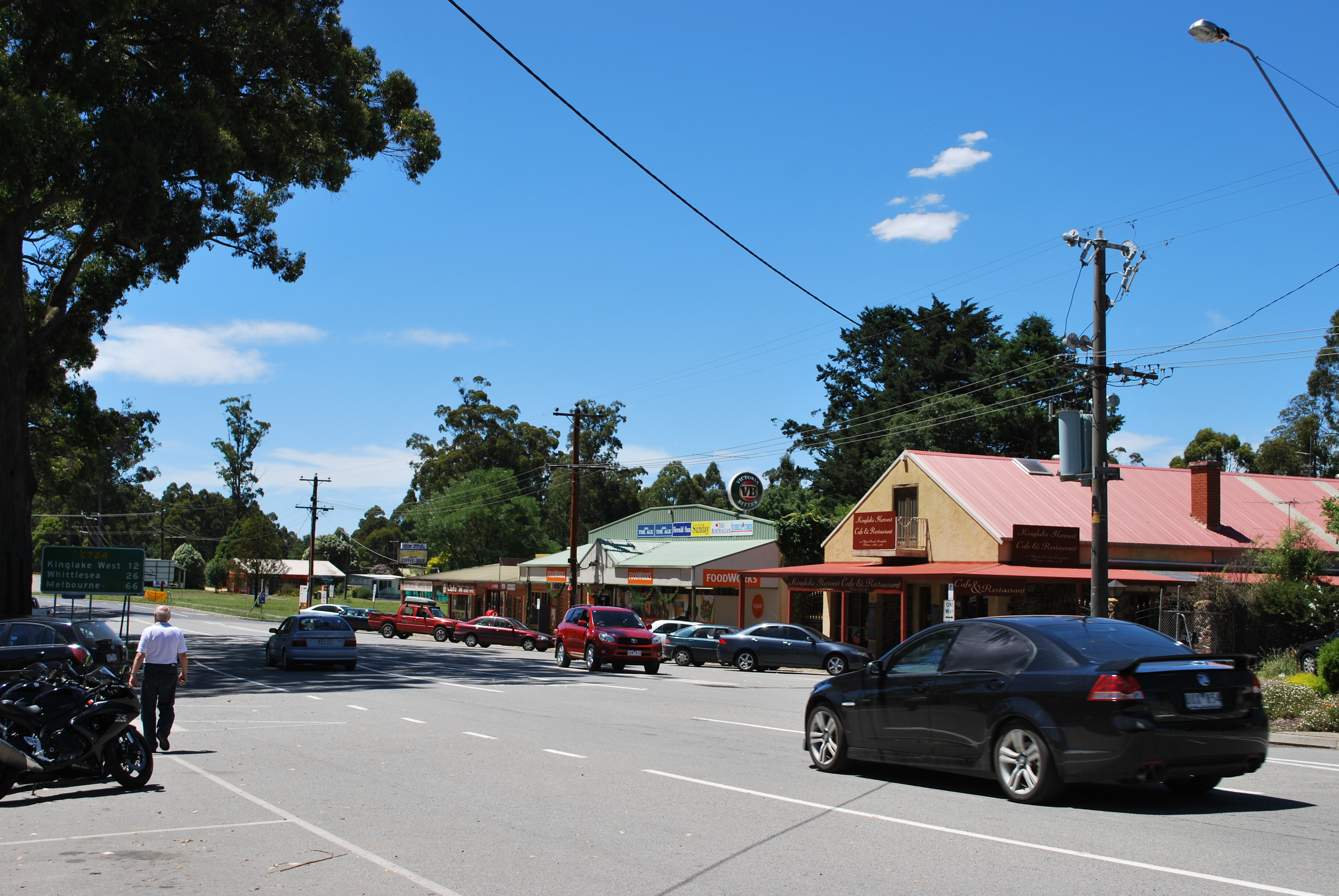
- Main street of Kinglake prior to the bushfire of 7 February 2009

- Interactive map of Kinglake
- Coordinates: 37°31′58″S 145°20′28″E
- Country: Australia
- State: Victoria
- Region: Hume
- LGAs: Shire of Murrindindi; Shire of Nillumbik
- Location: 56 km (35 mi) from Melbourne; 22 km (14 mi) from Hurstbridge

Government
  - State electorate: Eildon
  - Federal divisions: Indi; McEwen
- Elevation: 550 m (1,800 ft)

Population
  - Total: 1,662 (2021 census)
- Postcode: 3763
- Mean max temp: 16 °C (61 °F)
- Mean min temp: 8.2 °C (46.8 °F)
- Annual rainfall: 850 mm (33 in)
Localities around Kinglake
Kinglake Central and Pheasant Creek	Pheasant Creek	Toolangi
Kinglake West	Kinglake	Castella
Strathewen and St Andrews	Christmas Hills	Steels Creek

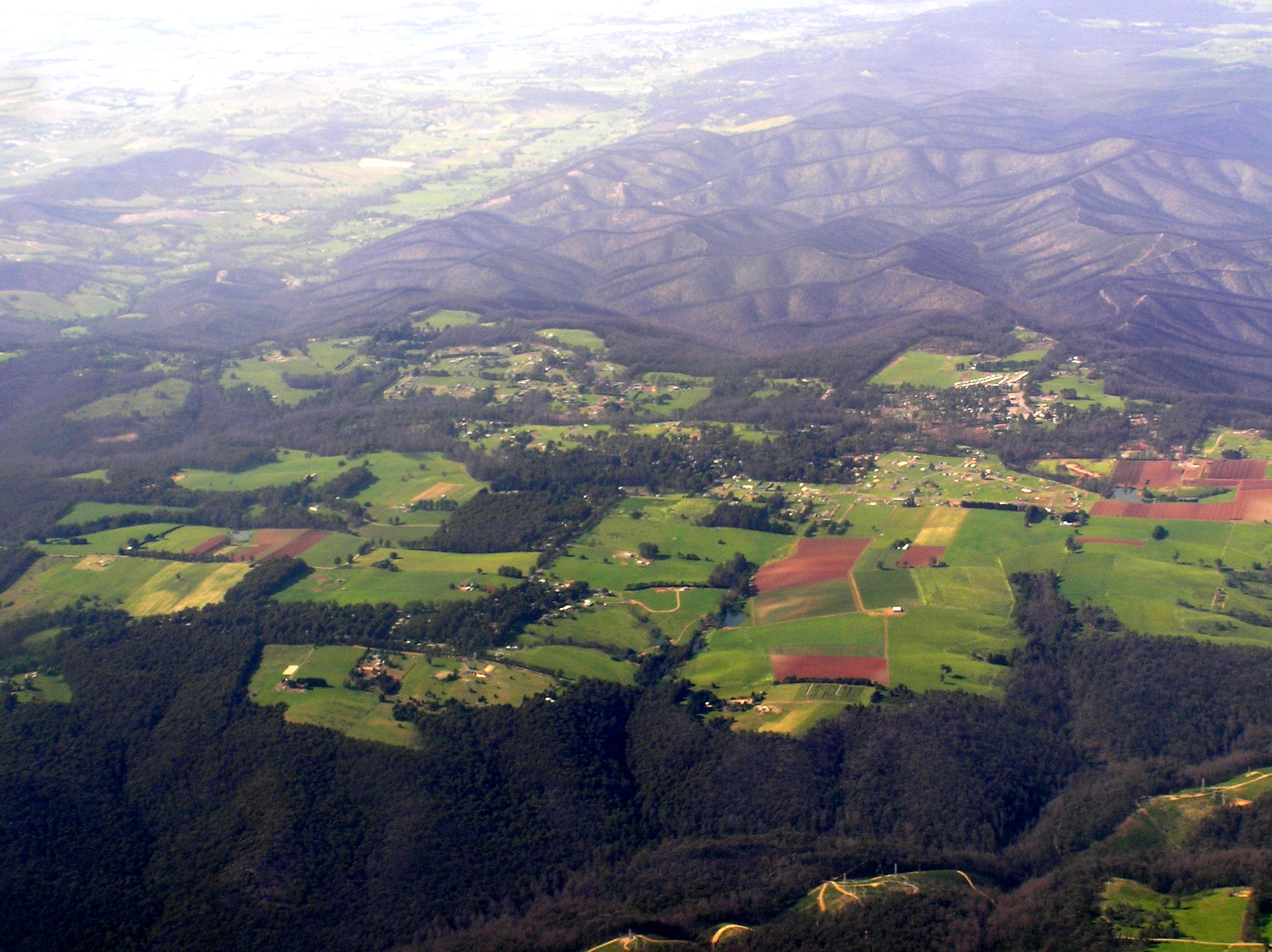
Aerial view from the north, a year after the 2009 bushfire

Kinglake is a town in Victoria, Australia, 56 km (35 mi) north-east of Melbourne's Central Business District, located within the Shires of Murrindindi and Nillumbik local government areas.

The town was one of the worst affected during the Black Saturday bushfires in 2009.

== Location ==
Kinglake township, is located 57 km (35 mi) north east of Melbourne. It comprises forest and farmland, and borders the Kinglake National Park. The Kinglake Ranges vary in height from 525 to 610 m (1,722 to 2,001 ft) above sea level. Many areas of Kinglake overlook the Melbourne skyline to the south west and the Yarra Valley wineries to the south, with views of Port Phillip Bay south of Melbourne possible on clear days. Kinglake is generally 3 °C colder than Metropolitan Melbourne, with the summers being very pleasant and heavy frosts, fog and occasional snowfall during winter.

== History ==
Gold was discovered in 1861 on Mount Slide to the east of the locality at an area which became known as Mountain Rush. A Mountain Rush Post Office opened on 7 May 1862, but closed in January 1863 as the miners moved to other locations.

Kinglake township was established much later and was named after British historian Alexander William Kinglake, whose eight-volume history of the Crimean War had recently been completed.

Kinglake Post Office opened on 14 May 1883. There was also an office at Kinglake East open from 1914 until 1950.

== Population ==
In the 2021 Census, there were 1662 people in Kinglake. 82.9% of people were born in Australia and 90% of people spoke only English at home. The most common responses for religion were "No Religion" 59.7% and Catholic 10%.

== Education ==
Education options that are available to Kinglake residents include the state secondary schools Whittlesea Secondary College and Yea High School. Private secondary schools are also available via numerous bus services that service the township. Primary schools include Kinglake Primary, Middle Kinglake and Kinglake West Primary.

== Sporting teams ==
The local Australian Rules football / netball club, known as 'The Lakers', plays in Division 2 of the Yarra Valley Mountain District Football League. As of 2023, the club plays in Division 3 of the Northern Football Netball League.

There is also a representative Basketball team that plays in the VJBL (Victorian Junior Basketball Leagues), under the Kinglake Basketball Club's guidance. These teams are also known as 'The Lakers'.

== Community groups ==
The Kinglake Ranges have a large number of Community Groups:

- Kinglake Ranges Foundation
- Rotary Club of Kinglake Ranges
- Kinglake Ranges Kinglake Ranges Neighbourhood House
- Kinglake Ranges Mens Shed
- Kinglake Action Network Development Organisation
- FireFoxes Australia
- Country Women's Association Kinglake
- Kinglake Boomerang Bags
- Lion's Club Kinglake
- Kinglake Ranges Business Network
- Kinglake Ranges Visual & Performing Arts Alliance
- Ellimatta Youth - Youth Services for the Kinglake Ranges
- Kinglake Landcare Group
- The Chef's Shed Musical Theatre Group

== Media ==
The Kinglake Ranges have several points for information and advertising. Two are community-run not for profit organisations: Kinglake Ranges Radio (UGFM) 94.5FM as part of the Upper Goulburn FM Community Radio Network; and printed every month is the Mountain Monthly - The Ranges News, established in 1981.

- UGFM
- Mountain Monthly - The Ranges News
- The Local Paper is the area's free weekly newspaper, produced and edited by the Eltham-based Ash Long.

== Bushfires ==
Kinglake has a long history of bushfires when extreme weather conditions occur. There were several bushfires at the end of January 2006, into early February 2006, when fires burnt out over 1,500 hectares (3,700 acres). The CFA, DSE Victoria and NSW firefighters managed to bring the fire to a halt. Fires also occurred in the 1982–1983 season and during the 1960s. The major fires of 1939 also placed the community at risk with a major ignition point being nearby. In 1926 major fires in the area caused significant losses; the Post Office being the only building left standing.

=== 2009 bushfire ===
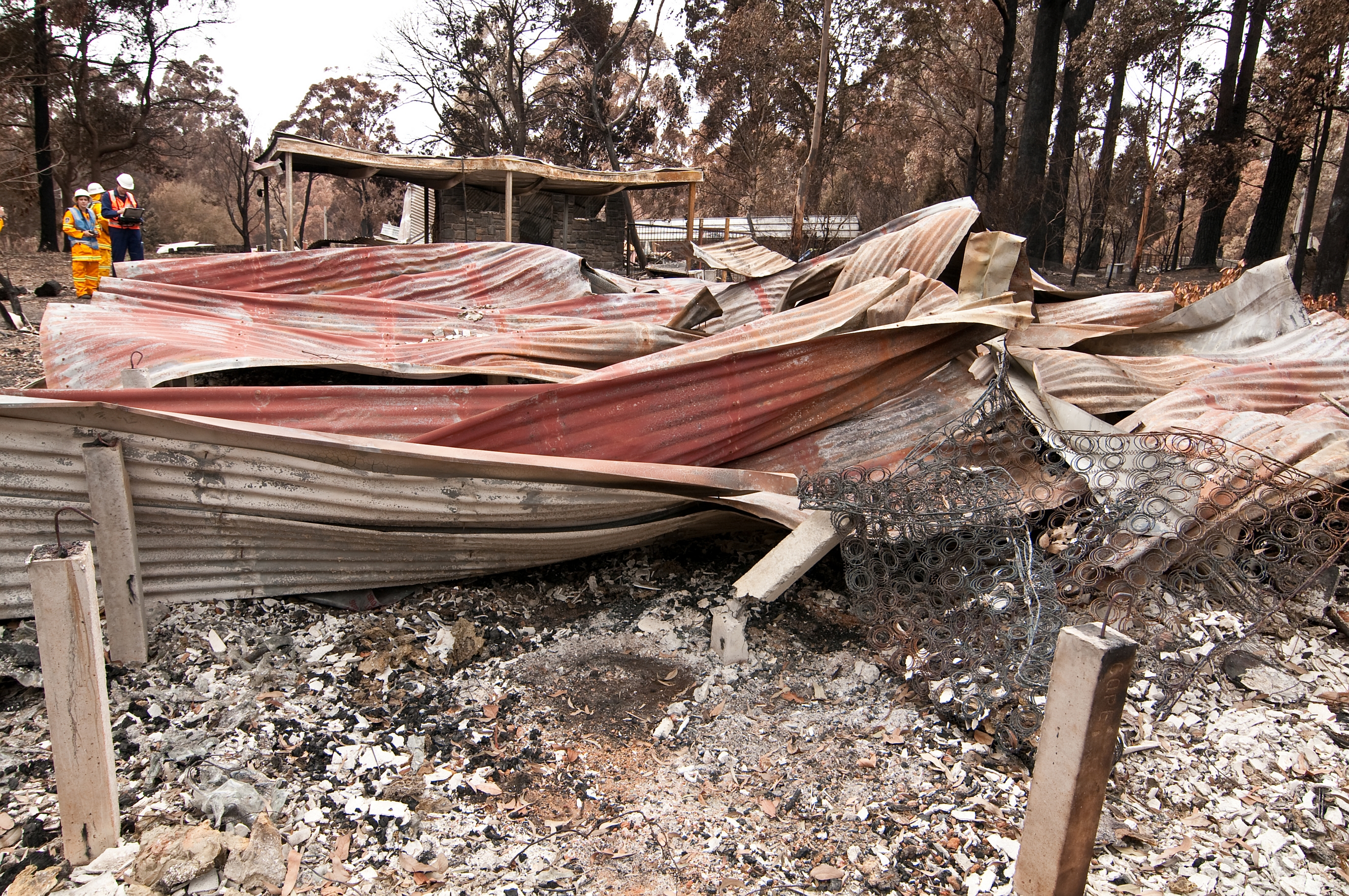
CSIRO conducting bushfire research at Kinglake after the Black Saturday bushfires

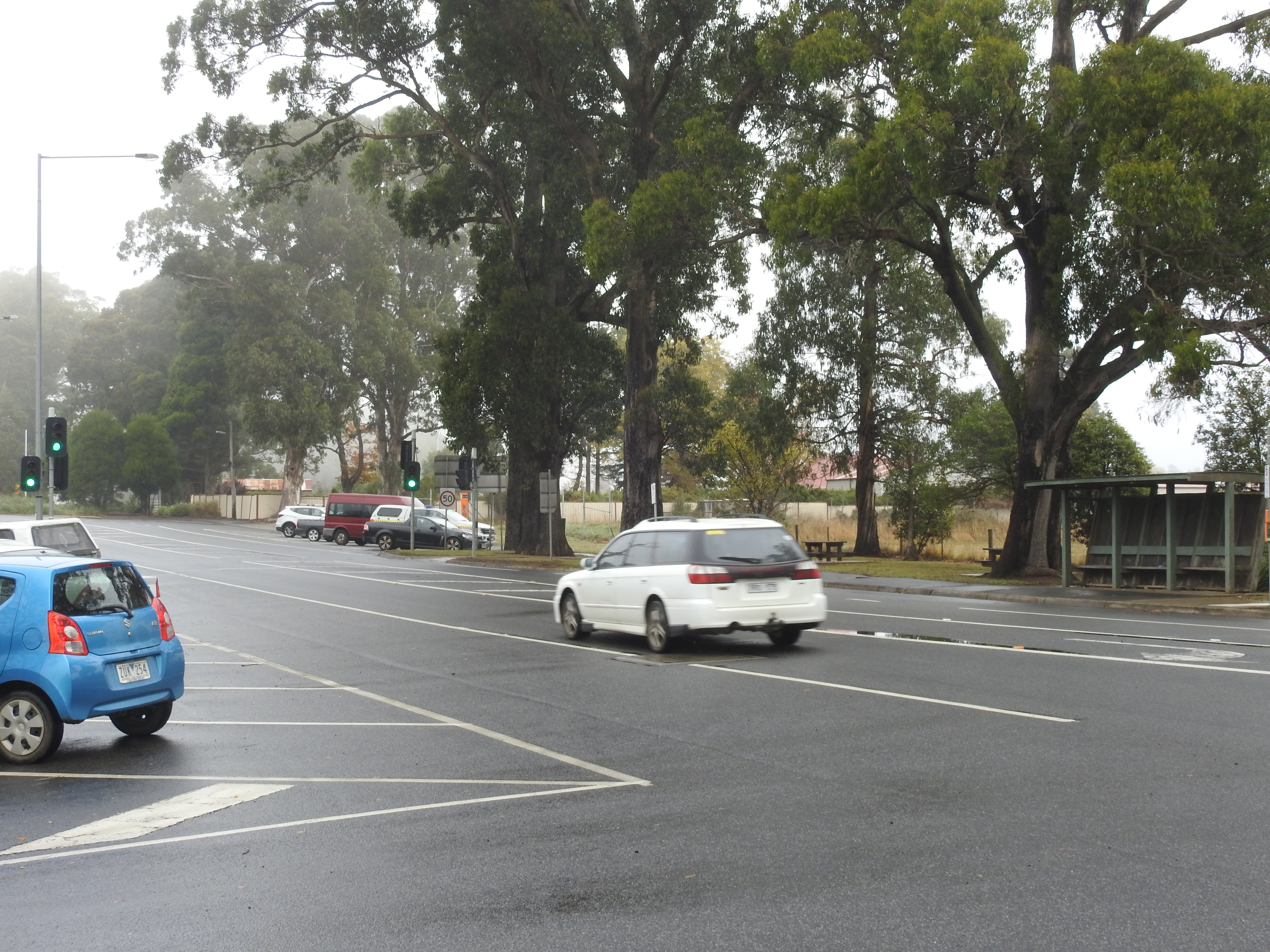
The main street of Kinglake in 2018

Kinglake was one of the main affected towns in the Black Saturday bushfires, with 38 people confirmed dead in Kinglake and Kinglake West, and more than 500 homes destroyed. Local resident and former GTV-9 newsreader Brian Naylor and his wife Moiree were confirmed to be amongst the dead. Not long after news reports had stated that the fire went through the whole town, Deputy Police Commissioner of Victoria Kieran Walshe revealed that six of the victims had been in the same car.

The cause of the Kilmore East-Kinglake bushfire was found by the 2009 Victorian Bushfires Royal Commission to be an ageing power line owned by SP AusNet, an energy distribution company. In December 2014 Victoria's Supreme Court approved an A$494 million settlement of a legal class action against SP AusNet, and Utility Services Group. It has been noted as being "the biggest class action settlement in Australian legal history". The previous highest payout was $200 Million in Kirby v Centro Properties Limited (No 6) [2012] FCA 650 (19 June 2012).

== Books on Kinglake ==
Stewart, Kath and Hawkins, Deidre Living with Fire: A brief history of fires in the Kinglake Ranges, Kinglake, Vic. Kinglake Historical Society, 2019 ISBN 9780987121783

O'Connor, Jane. "Without Warning: One woman's story of surviving Black Saturday", Prahan, Vic. Hardie Grant Books, 2010 ISBN 9781740668477

== See also ==
- Shire of Eltham – Kinglake was previously within this former local government area.
- Shire of Yea – Kinglake was previously within this former local government area.
- City of Whittlesea - part of Kinglake West was, and some parts still are, in this current local government area.
