= Yan Yean Road =

Road in Melbourne, Victoria, Australia

Yan Yean Road Victoria
- Coordinates: 37.572586°S 145.144032°E (North end); 37.677963°S 145.125589°E (South end)

General information
- Type: Road
- Length: 12.6 km (7.8 mi)
- Route number(s): Metro Route 57 (1989–present) (Doreen–Diamond Creek)

Major junctions
- North end: Ridge Road; Yan Yean, Victoria
- Arthurs Creek Road; Bridge Inn Road; Ironbark Road; Kurrak Road; Diamond Creek Road
- South end: Aqueduct Road; Diamond Creek, Melbourne

Location(s)
- Major suburbs: Doreen, Plenty, Diamond Creek

Yan Yean Road is a major road in the outer north-eastern suburbs of Melbourne, Victoria, Australia. Yan Yean Road begins at the intersection with Diamond Creek Road and Aqueduct Road in Diamond Creek, extending northward through the suburbs of Plenty, Yarrambat and Doreen before terminating in Yan Yean near the Yan Yean Reservoir. The road, previously a rural road until development in the 2000s, is now an important arterial link between the traditional north-eastern suburbs of Melbourne and new estates in Doreen and Mernda.

== Route ==
Yan Yean Road begins at the intersection with Diamond Creek Road and Aqueduct Road in Diamond Creek, heading northbound as a 4 lane, divided road with a speed limit of 70km/h. It travels through the semi rural communities of Plenty and Yarrambat. North of the Kurrak Road intersection in Yarrambat, the road narrows to a 2 lane, single carriageway continuing north towards the developing suburb of Doreen. At the Bridge Inn Road intersection, the road continues north with the newer estates on the western side of the road. This section of the road is classed as a local road as opposed to an arterial road and has a speed limit of 80km/h. The road ends at the intersection with Arthurs Creek Road in Yan Yean.

== History ==
The road was assigned Metropolitan Route 57 in 1989, which continues at the southern point along Diamond Creek Road and continues westward at Bridge Inn Road.

The passing of the Road Management Act 2004 granted the responsibility of overall management and development of Victoria's major arterial roads to VicRoads: in 2004, VicRoads re-declared the road as Yan Yean Road (Arterial #5724), beginning at Kurrak Road at Yarrambat and ending at Diamond Creek Road in Diamond Creek, the section of Yan Yean Road between Arthurs Creek and Kurrak Roads through Doreen remains undeclared.

The road prior to 2019 was a 2 lane single carriageway road along its entire length, which with commuters from the developing suburbs of Doreen and Mernda relying on this road to travel to the Melbourne CBD and inner suburbs, the road was carrying traffic far beyond its design limit. The Yan Yean Road Upgrade Stage 1 duplicated and reworked the road between Diamond Creek Road and Kurrak Road, providing an additional lane in each direction as well as upgrading a number of intersections along the route with traffic lights and removing a dangerous set of corners near the Heard Avenue intersection. This upgrade was completed in 2019.

=== Major works ===
Whilst the Yan Yean Road Upgrade Stage 1 improved a significant portion of the road, the road now experiences additional bottlenecks around the Kurrak Road, Ironbark Road and Bridge Inn Road intersections with cars often queuing for kilometres. The Yan Yean Road Upgrade Stage 2 will duplicate the road to Bridge Inn Road, as well as upgrade a number of intersections along the route. The upgrade is currently undergoing an EES (Environment Effects Statement) review, and is currently anticipated to begin construction no earlier than 2022.

== Major intersections ==
LGA	Location	km	mi	Destinations	Notes
Whittlesea–Nillumbik boundary	Yan Yean–Doreen boundary	0.0	0.0	Ridge Road – Yan Yean	Northern terminus of road, continues north as Ridge Road
Whittlesea–Nillumbik boundary	Yan Yean–Doreen boundary	0.0	0.0	Arthurs Creek Road – Arthurs Creek	
Whittlesea–Nillumbik boundary	Doreen	3.8	2.4	Bridge Inn Road (Metro Route 57 west) – Mernda, Wollert; Doctors Gully Road (east) – Nutfield	Metro Route 57 continues west along Bridge Inn Road
Nillumbik	Yarrambat–Plenty boundary	9.3	5.8	Kurrak Road (Metro Route 58) – South Morang, Epping	
Nillumbik	Plenty–Diamond Creek boundary	12.6	7.8	Diamond Creek Road (Metro Route 46 west, east/Metro Route 57 east) – Ivanhoe, Greensborough, Wattle Glen	Metro Route 57 continues east along Diamond Creek Road
Nillumbik	Plenty–Diamond Creek boundary	12.6	7.8	Aqueduct Road – St Helena	Southern terminus of road, continues south as Aqueduct Road
Route transition
