= Doreen, Victoria =

Doreen
- Suburb
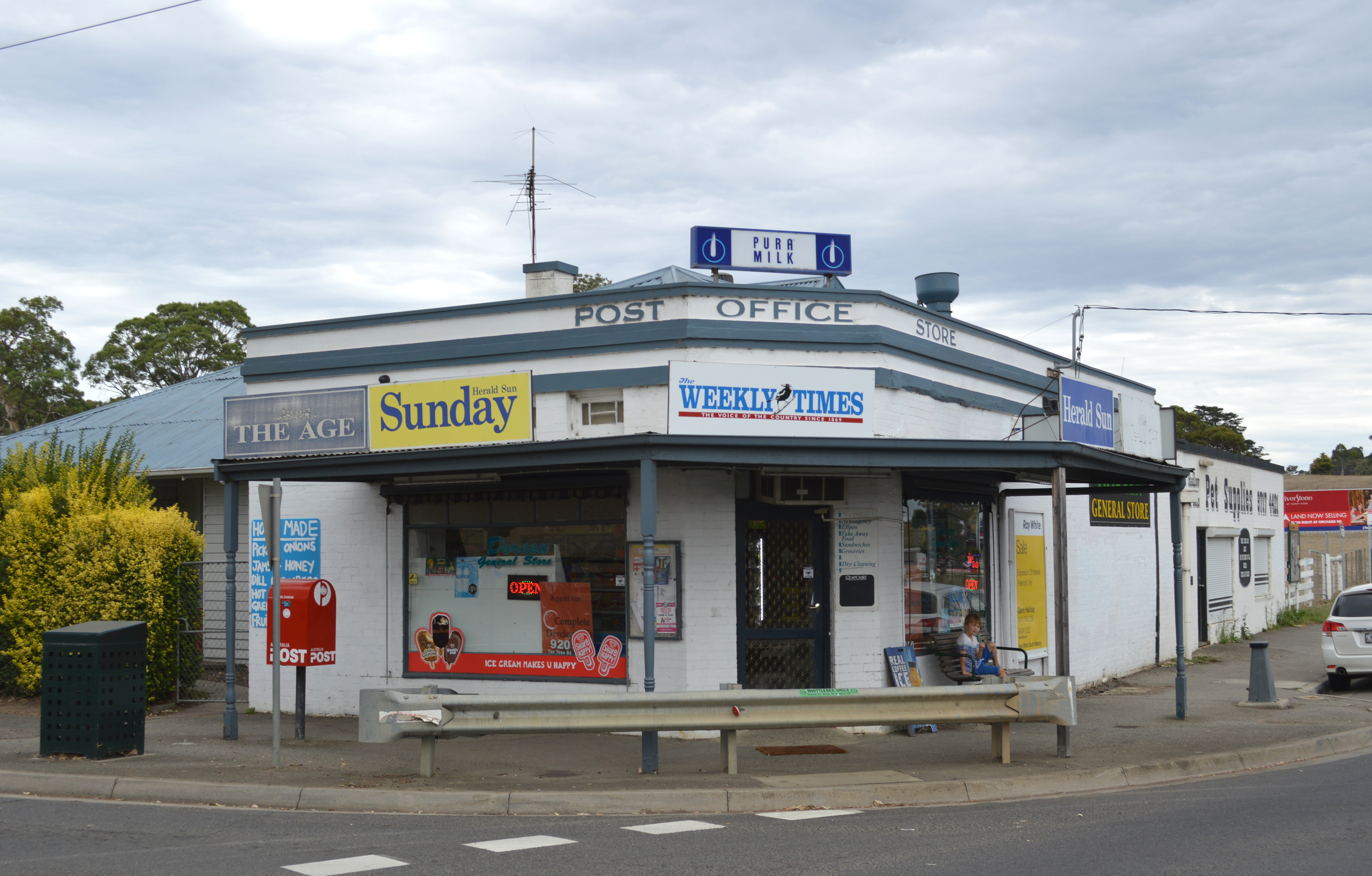
- Doreen General Store

- Interactive map of Doreen
- Coordinates: 37.605°S 145.146°E
- Country: Australia
- State: Victoria
- City: Melbourne
- LGAs: City of Whittlesea; Shire of Nillumbik
- Location: 29 km (18 mi) NE of Melbourne; 6 km (3.7 mi) NW of Hurstbridge
- Established: 1844

Government
  - State electorate: Yan Yean
  - Federal division: McEwen
- Elevation: 170 m (560 ft)

Population
  - Total: 27,122 (2021 census)
- Postcode: 3754
Suburbs around Doreen
Yan Yean		Arthurs Creek
Mernda	Doreen	Nutfield
South Morang	Yarrambat	Hurstbridge

Doreen is a suburb of Melbourne, Victoria, Australia, 29 km (18 mi) north-east of Melbourne's Central Business District, located within the City of Whittlesea and Shire of Nillumbik local government areas. Doreen recorded a population of 27,122 at the 2021 census.

Patrick Reid settled the area in 1844, calling it "Hazel Glen". The Post Office opened on 8 December 1870 as Hazelglen, and was renamed Doreen in 1895.

The area has a community hall and a Country Fire Authority fire station.

== History ==
Doreen was initially established by Europeans in the year 1844. One of these early settlers was Patrick Reid. Reid had a holding over the land, calling the area "Hazel Glen". In 1862, Reid's holdings over the land were subdivided into farmland, which led to further settlers coming to the area. The increase in settlers led to the construction of a Methodist church on the corner of Yan Yean Road and Chapel Lane, which was opened in 1862.

The Doreen name comes from John Gavan Duffy, the Victorian Postmaster-General and a member of the Legislative Assembly.

Hazel Glen Common School (currently Doreen Primary) was later built by the local community and was completed in 1867. The school later received aid from the government on 1 July 1868, and was then recognised as Hazel Glen Common School No.945.

== Demographics ==
At the 2016 census, Doreen recorded a population of 21,298 people. The population was 48.5% male, 51.5% female, and had a median age of 31, which was 6 years younger than the state median and 7 years younger than the national median.

Age Range	Population	%
0–14	6174	29.0
15–29	3825	18.0
30–44	5925	27.8
45–60	3262	15.3
60+	2112	9.9

81% of people in Doreen were born in Australia. The five most common international birth countries were:

1. England 2.9%
2. India 1.4%
3. New Zealand 1.2%
4. Italy 0.8%
5. Sri Lanka 0.7%

== Education ==
=== Local Schools ===
As of August 2018, there are currently six schools housed within the suburb of Doreen.

School name	Years	Public/ Private
Hazel Glen College	Kinder – 12	Public
Laurimar Primary School	Prep – 6	Public
St Paul the Apostle Catholic School	Prep – 6	Private
Doreen Primary School	Prep – 6	Public
Plenty Valley Christian College	Kinder – 12	Private
Ivanhoe Grammar School	Prep – 12	Private

=== Tertiary education ===
The Bundoora campus of RMIT is an approximate 15 minute drive, with the Bundoora campus of La Trobe University an approximate 30 minute drive.

== Suburban development ==
Doreen is unusual in that it can be divided into two smaller areas, with Yan Yean Road being the divider;

- The eastern portion lies within the Shire of Nillumbik and remains rural, being contiguous with the rural localities of Arthurs Creek , Yarrambat and Nutfield. This part of Doreen is lies within the green wedge of Melbourne, land set aside for the provision for the use of land for agriculture; to protect, conserve and enhance the cultural heritage significance, and the character of open rural and scenic non-urban landscapes; and to protect and enhance biodiversity.
- The western portion lies within the City of Whittlesea and has seen the development of suburban housing and facilities. It is contiguous with the suburbs of Mernda, Yarrambat, and Yan Yean.

Residential development is of two kinds:

- Rural residential estates and nurseries to the south.
- A residential estate, Laurimar, in the north is being developed by Delfin with an emphasis on "semi-rural" living.

Doreen is very green and quite hilly and is surrounded by the foothills of the Yarra Ranges to the east and north and the forested banks of the Plenty River to the west. As part of it being on the urban fringe, it has a wide variety of animal life including bird life. To the north is Yan Yean Reservoir, which is the oldest reservoir in Melbourne.

== Facilities ==
A mobile library that visits Doreen is operated by Yarra Plenty Regional Library.

== Transport ==
=== Bus ===
Four bus routes service Doreen:

- 381 : Mernda station – Diamond Creek station. Operated by Dysons.
- 385 : Whittlesea – Greensborough Plaza via Mernda station. Operated by Dysons.
- 388 : Mernda station – Mernda station via Doreen (anti-clockwise loop). Operated by Dysons.
- 389 : Mernda station – Mernda station via Doreen (clockwise loop). Operated by Dysons.

=== Train ===
Mernda station, located in neighbouring Mernda, is the nearest railway station to Doreen, and is the terminus for the Mernda line.
