= Nutfield =

Nutfield can refer to:

- Nutfield, Victoria, suburb of Melbourne, Victoria, Australia
- Nutfield, Surrey in Surrey, England
- Nutfield, County Fermanagh, a townland in County Fermanagh, Northern Ireland
- Nutfield, New Hampshire, the colonial township from which the modern places of Londonderry, Derry, Windham and parts of Salem, Hudson, and the city of Manchester were formed.
