= Mernda railway station =

Railway station in Melbourne, Australia

Mernda
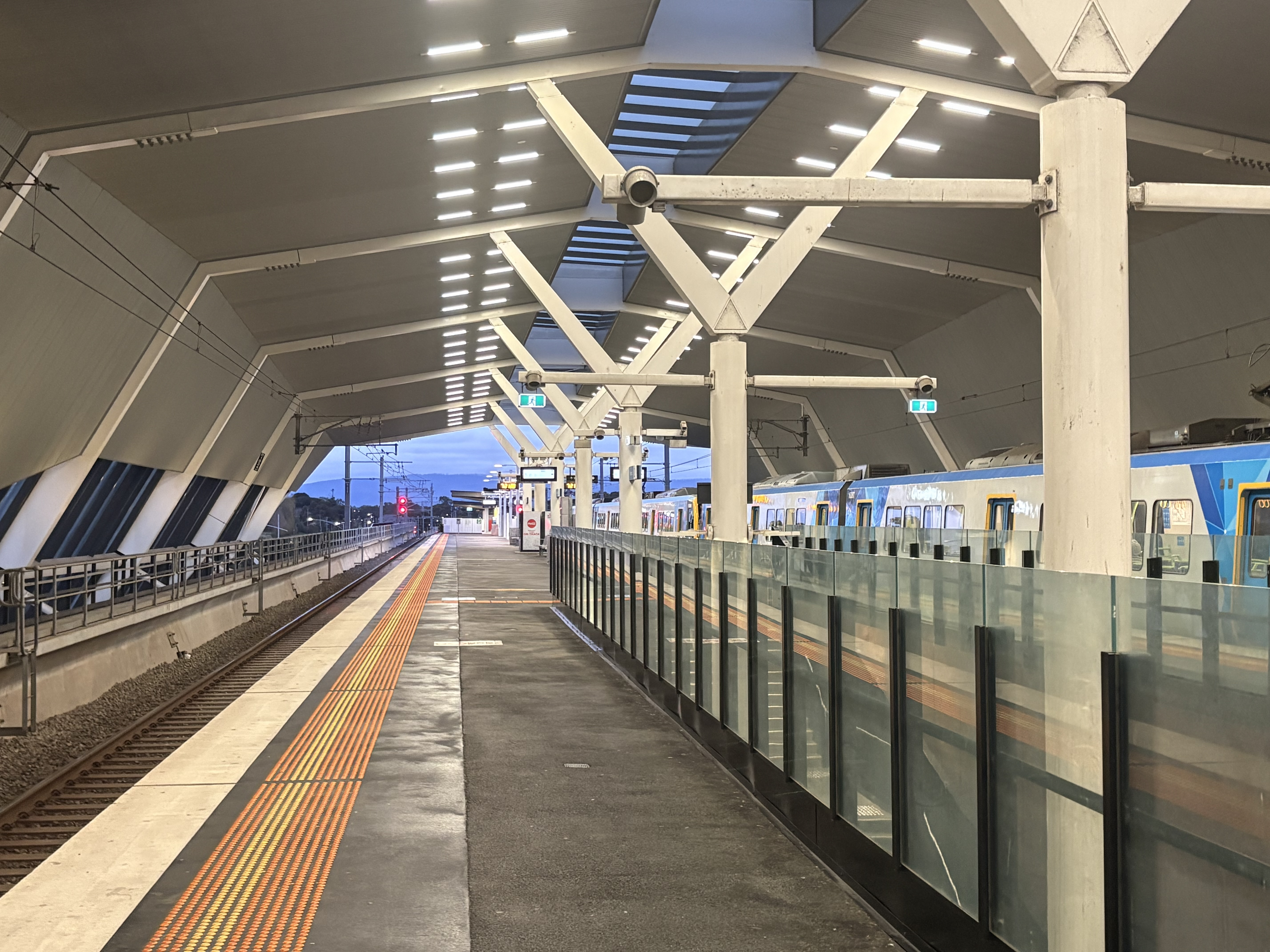
- Northbound view from Platform 2 in June 2026

General information
- Location: Bridge Inn Road, Mernda, Victoria 3754; City of Whittlesea; Australia
- Coordinates: 37°35′58″S 145°6′5″E
- System: PTV commuter rail station
- Owner: VicTrack
- Operator: Metro Trains
- Lines: Mernda (current); Whittlesea (formerly)
- Distance: 33.07 kilometres from Southern Cross
- Platforms: 2 (1 island)
- Tracks: 2
- Connections: Bus

Construction
- Structure type: Elevated
- Parking: 1,000 spaces
- Cycle facilities: Yes
- Accessible: Yes—step free access

Other information
- Status: Operational, premium station
- Station code: MDD
- Fare zone: Myki zone 2
- Website: Public Transport Victoria

History
- Opened: 23 December 1889; 136 years ago
- Closed: 29 November 1959
- Rebuilt: 26 August 2018; 8 years ago
- Electrified: July 2018 (1500 V DC overhead)
- Former names: South Yan Yean (1889–1913)

Passengers
- 2018–2019: 562,350
- 2019–2020: 527,250 ▼6.24%
- 2020–2021: 327,900 ▼37.8%
- 2021–2022: 447,850 ▲36.58%
- 2022–2023: 672,750 ▲50.22%
- 2023–2024: 710,550 ▲5.62%
- 2024–2025: 662,700 ▼6.73%

Services
Preceding station	Metro Trains	Following station
Hawkstowe towards Flinders Street	Mernda line	Terminus
Former services
Preceding station	VicRail	Following station
South Morang towards Thomastown	Whittlesea line	Yan Yean towards Whittlesea
List of closed railway stations in Melbourne
Track layout
Location

Mernda station is a railway station operated by Metro Trains Melbourne and the terminus of the Mernda line, part of the Melbourne rail network. It serves the north-eastern Melbourne suburb of Mernda in Victoria, Australia. Mernda is an elevated premium station, featuring an island platform with two faces. The original station opened on 23 December 1889 and closed on 29 November 1959. The station reopened on 26 August 2018 with the reopening of the line from South Morang.

== History ==
=== Original (1889–1959) ===
The original Mernda station opened on 23 December 1889, when the railway line from Reservoir railway was extended to Whittlesea. It was originally named South Yan Yean, and was renamed Mernda on 1 December 1913.

Mernda operated until the closure of the line beyond Lalor on 29 November 1959, following the electrification of the line as far as Lalor. Epping was re-opened on 29 November 1964, with the electrification of that section of the line. The remaining section of track from Epping to Whittlesea was dismantled in the 1970s, although the former right-of-way remained intact. Prior to the rebuilding, all that remained of the former station was a degraded platform, which was overgrown with exotic vegetation, including a peppercorn tree. The station-master's house was believed to have been moved to the Findon Pony Club, and still serves as their clubrooms.

=== Current (2018–present) ===
Restoration of the railway to Mernda was identified as a goal in the Strategic Transportation Study undertaken by the City of Whittlesea in 2002. The council had forecast that the population in Mernda and Doreen will be 40,000 by that time. The South Morang and Mernda Rail Alliance, which was successful in lobbying the state government to fulfill its promise of reinstating the rail line to South Morang, then lobbied the government to commit to reinstating the line to Mernda. In February 2016, the Victorian State Government announced the station would reopen in 2019.

The State Government announced funding in its 2016/17 State Budget to provide 8 km of duplicated track between South Morang and Mernda, a rebuilt station at Mernda with 1,000 car-parking spaces, and an additional station to be built near Marymede Catholic College. On 26 August 2018, this extension opened.

== Platforms and services ==
Mernda has one island platform with two faces. It is serviced by Metro Trains' Mernda line services.

Mernda platform arrangement
Platform	Line	Destination	Service Type	Source
1	Mernda line	Flinders Street	All stations and limited express services	
2	Mernda line	Flinders Street	All stations and limited express services	

== Transport links ==
Kinetic Melbourne operates eight bus routes via Mernda station, under contract to Transport Victoria:

- 381 : to Diamond Creek station
- 382 : Whittlesea – Northland Shopping Centre
- 385 : Whittlesea – Greensborough Plaza
- 386 : to RMIT University Bundoora campus
- 387 : to RMIT University Bundoora campus
- 388 : to Mernda station (anti-clockwise loop via Doreen)
- 389 : to Mernda station (clockwise loop via Doreen)
- 390 : to Craigieburn station

== Gallery ==
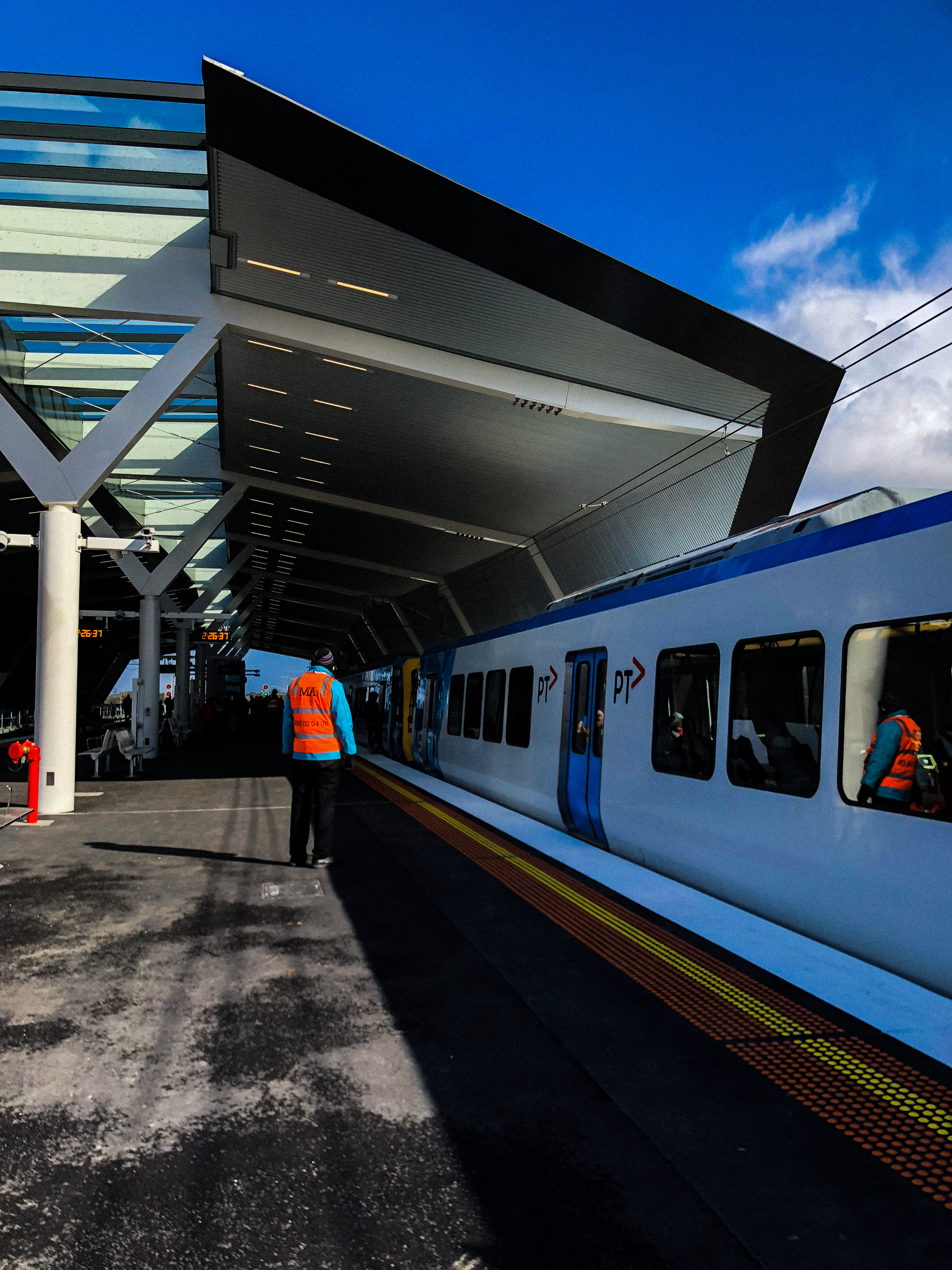
Southbound view from Platform 2, during the Community Sneak Peek Day, August 2018

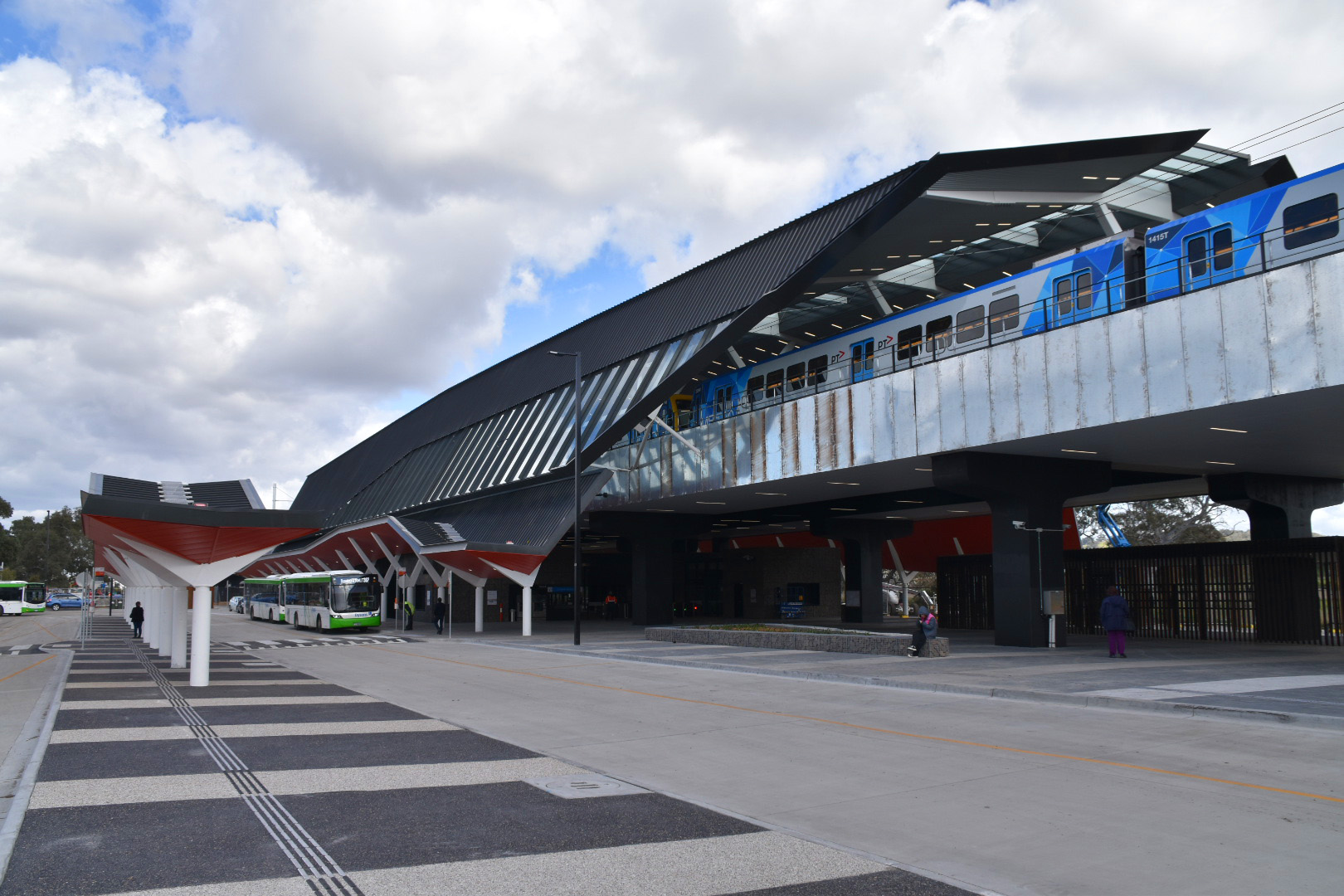
Station forecourt, bus bays, concourse, elevated platforms and entrance, August 2018

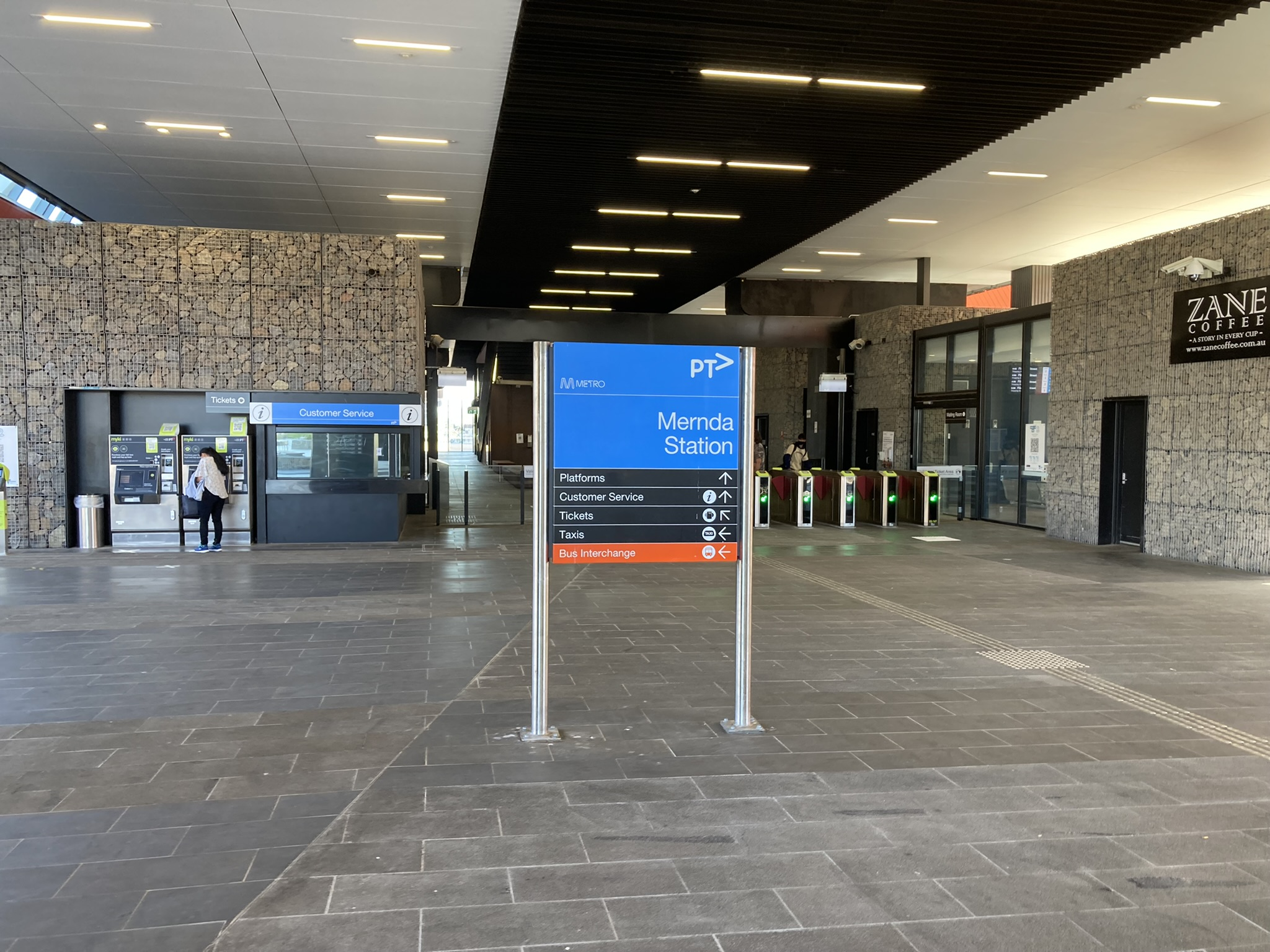
Station concourse, entrance signage and customer service, December 2021

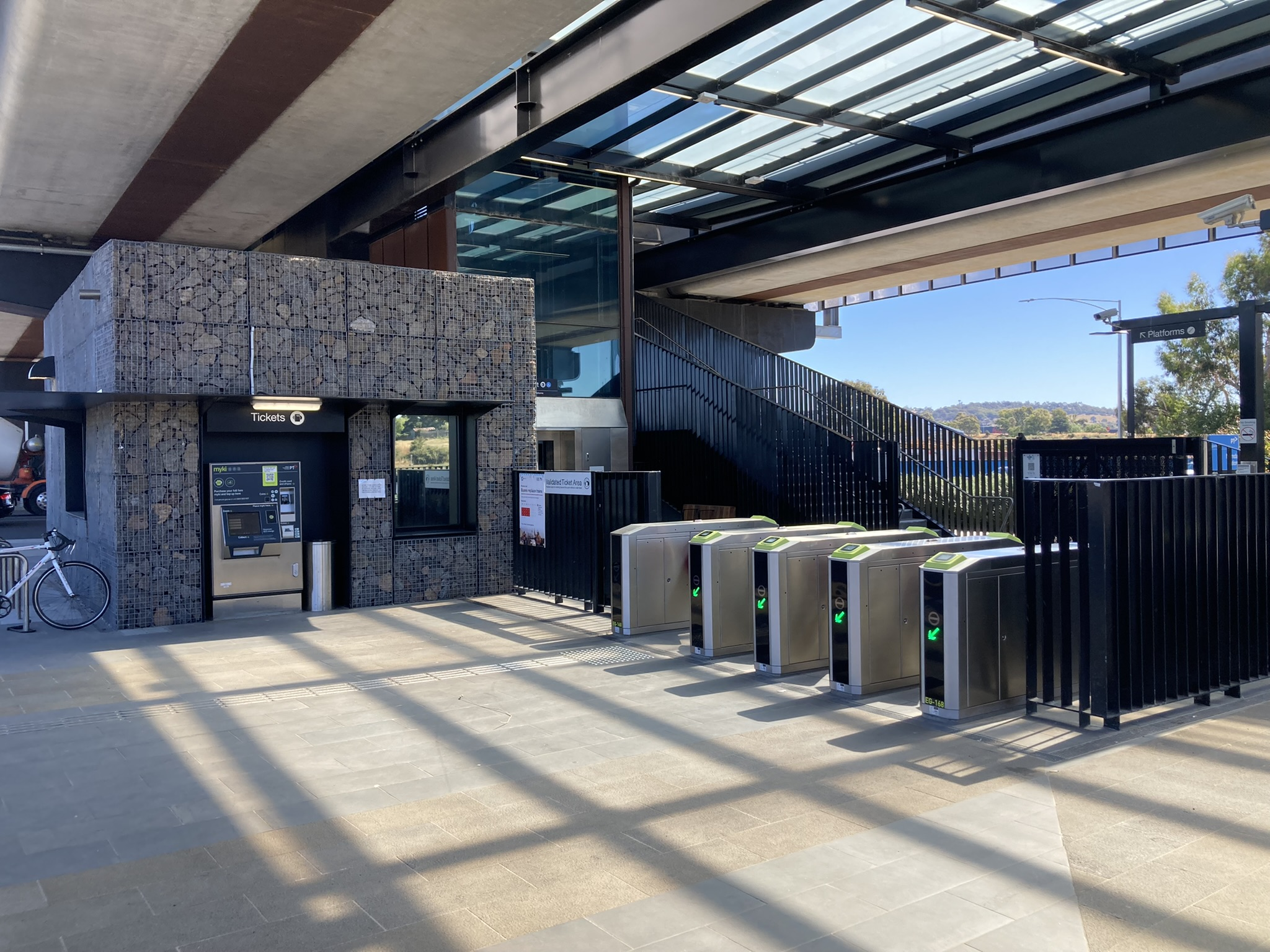
The Myki readers, Myki machine, stairs and fence at the concourse, December 2021

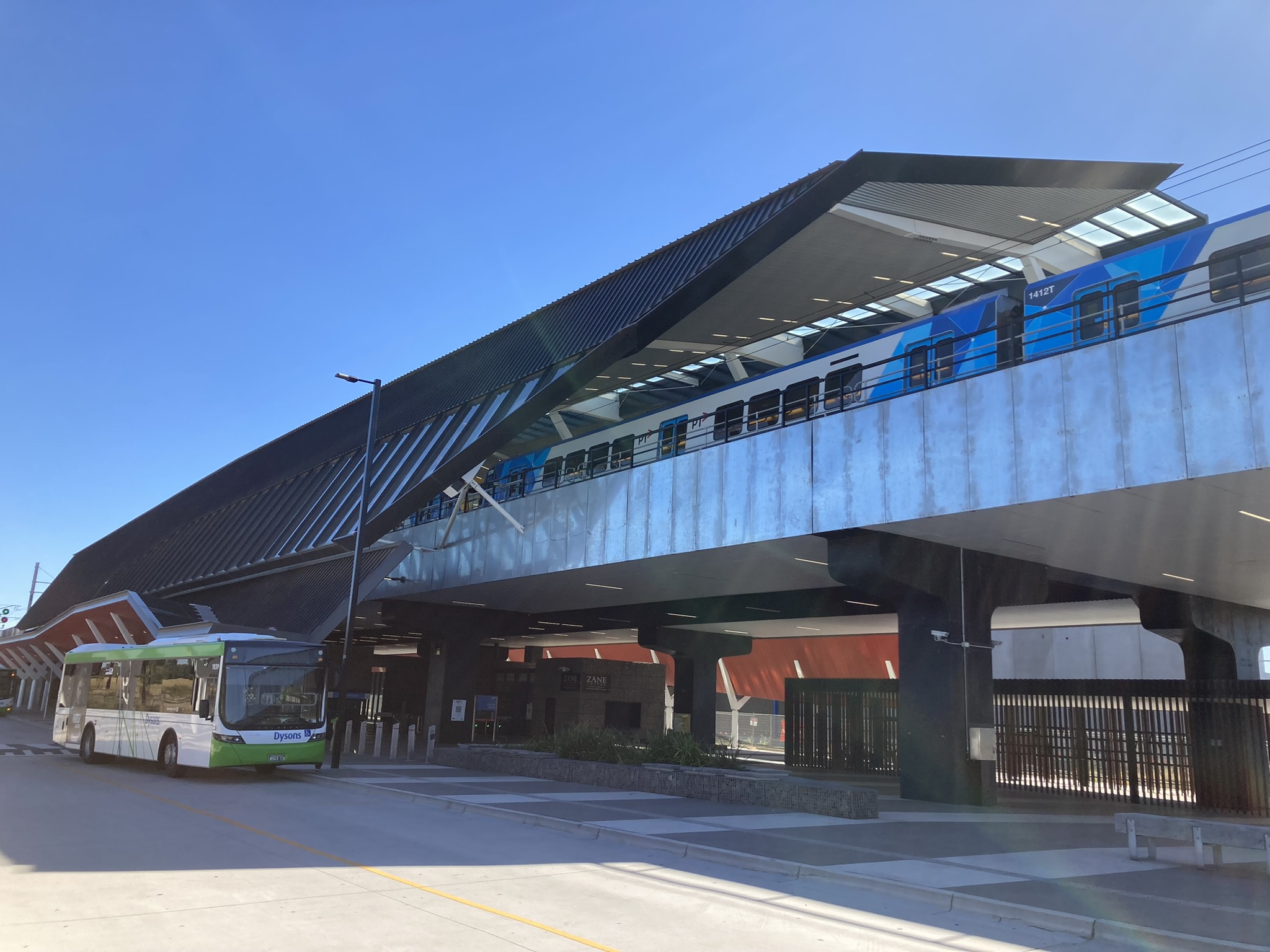
Station concourse, elevated platforms, bus bays, forecourt and entrance, December 2021
