= Yarra Plenty Regional Library =

Library network, Melbourne, Australia

Yarra Plenty Regional Library (YPRL) provides a public library service to the local government municipalities of the City of Banyule, Shire of Nillumbik and City of Whittlesea in the northeast of Melbourne Australia and located on the lands of the Woiworung. It is an independent legal entity with an executive management team which is responsible for day-to-day operations of the organisation. It is managed by the Yarra Plenty Regional Library Board made of two representatives (councillors) of the three municipalities that constitute the service. Its role is to set the policy and direction for the regional library service. The library service covers an area of 988.4 km^{2} including metropolitan, urban fringe and rural populations. The organisation is administered from its Library Support Services (LSS) located at Daniher Drive, Sth Morang.

Service delivery is provided through branch libraries located at Greensborough, Eltham, Ivanhoe, Lalor, Mernda, Mill Park, Rosanna, Thomastown, Watsonia and Whittlesea, one pop-up location and four Click & Collect Services. Two mobile libraries provide services including a specially designed vehicle that visits institutions for those residents unable to visit a library.

In 2017 there were 115,000 members constituting 31 per cent of a population of nearly 400,000 people across the three municipalities. It had 155 staff and issued 3.6 million loans that year.

== History ==
Library services operated for many years throughout the region, including in the old Shire offices in Heidelberg and in the town hall building at Ivanhoe before the Free Library Service Board was established. The history of public library service in the City of Heidelberg dates back to 1899. As early as 1883 Whittlesea Shire residents were lobbying for a library. The Heidelberg Library Association joined the Board in 1951 and the Heidelberg City Library developed. Heidelberg City Library operated the first bookmobile in Victoria in 1954. Heidelberg City Library became Heidelberg Regional Library in 1965 following the City of Heidelberg's agreement with the former Shire of Eltham and the Shire of Diamond Valley The Shire of Eltham was represented by Councilors Charice Pelling and John Lewis. In December 1976 the Shire of Whittlesea formerly became a member of the Heidelberg Regional Library Service. A books on wheels program was first established out of Rosanna Library in 1977 when volunteers delivered books to housebound people.

Heidelberg Regional Library changed its name to Yarra Plenty Regional Library Service in 1985. Following changes in local government boundaries, under the Local Government Act 1989, an agreement between the new municipalities of Nillumbik Shire Council and Banyule and Whittlesea City Councils formed a Regional Library Corporation in 1996.

In August 2018 YPRL removed all fines from children's books. On 1 July 2019 the library removed all fines from all items returned late.

=== Response to COVID-19 Pandemic ===
On 16 March 2020 all branches were closed (including book return chutes) in response to the COVID-19 pandemic in Australia. From the initial lockdown period, library staff phoned library members over the age of 70. A total of 8,000 people. The Project was promoted via the ABC's 7.30 with Leigh Sales. Care boxes were delivered to eligible vulnerable members of the library including books, magazines, DVDs and CDs. Digital downloads increased over 200%. Between 1 April 2020 to 31 March 2021, YPRL saw a combined e-audio and ebook increase of 45%.

== Library Management System ==
In July 2020 YPRL signed a five-year deal with Civica for the provision of the Spydus Library Management System (LMS).

== Partnerships ==
YPRL has provided LMS services to Murrindindi Library Service, including full access to the library's database since 1996. It also has a partnership with Warrnambool Library to provide the library management system, manage their collection and procurement and provide access to e-resources.

== Libraries ==
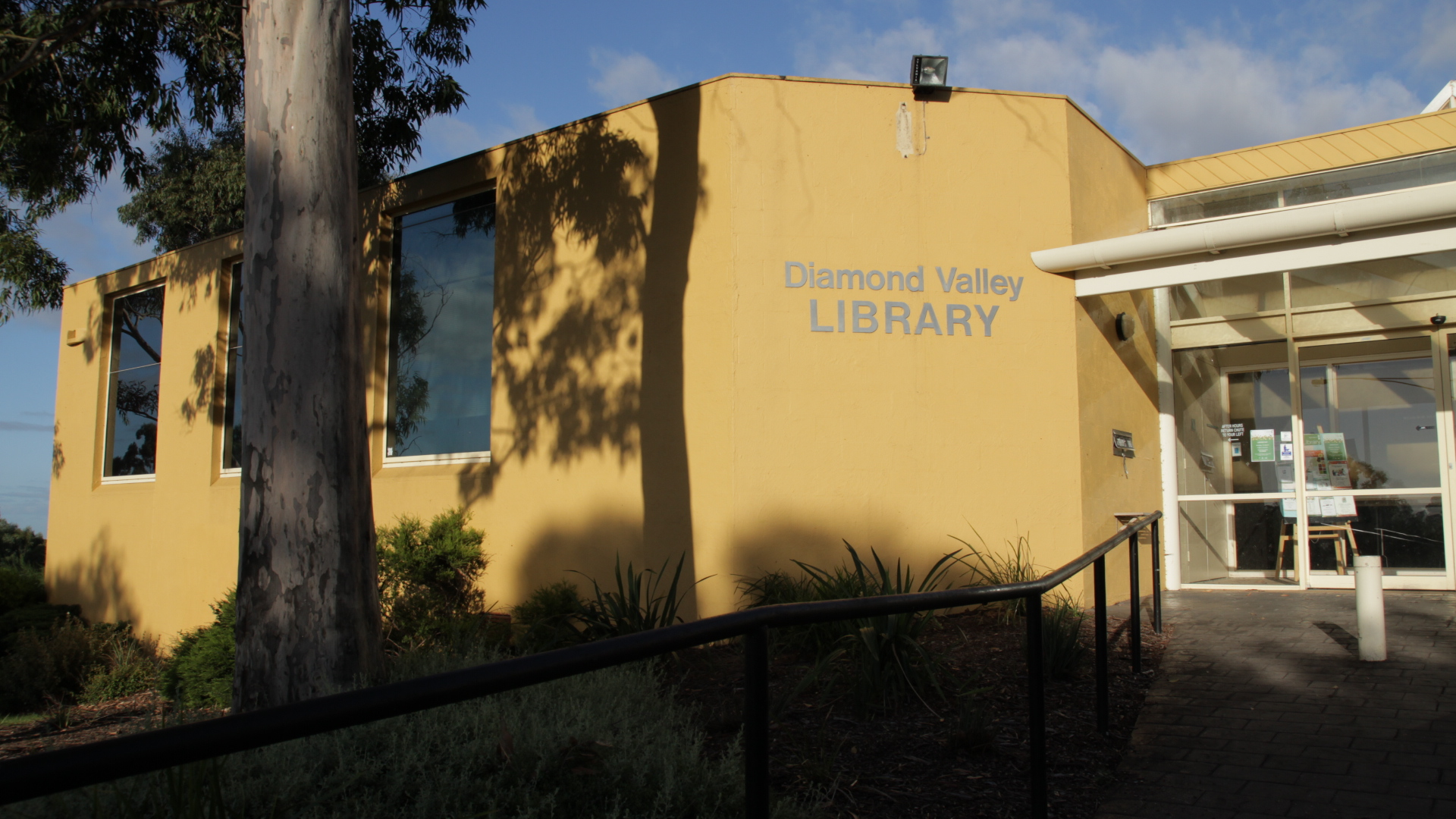
Diamond Valley Library, 2011

=== Diamond Valley Library ===
Diamond Valley Library is one of two libraries in the Shire of Nillumbik. It is located beside the Nillumbik Shire Offices in Civic Drive,Greensborough. The current building was opened on 5 May 1984 at a cost of $430,534.

It replaced the former library which operated out of the basement of the former Shire of Diamond Valley Civic Centre. It holds a local history collection which features a record of the history of the community who made up the former Shire of Diamond Valley.The library was extended and refurbished with new features added in 1993 and again in December 2019. Nillumbik Shire Council received $500,000 for the redevelopment of the library under the Living Libraries Infrastructure Program. The refurbished library was opened in February 2022. Improvements include a renovated glass atrium, expanded children's area, new parents' room and accessible unisex toilets, a covered outdoor deck, meeting pods, new community room and co-working and study spaces. The library is a member of the Stephanie Alexander Kitchen Garden Foundation which aims to help children form positive food habits for life, by embedding gardening in food education. The library has a seed library. State Government funding was announced in October 2022 to revitalise the outdoor space.

The Diamond Valley Toy Library operates out of the library.

=== Eltham Library ===
Eltham Library, 1994

Eltham Library is one of two libraries in the Shire of Nillumbik. The library complex was officially opened on 22 May 1994 and replaced a previous library. The building is located in a historically significant setting adjacent to Shillinglaw Cottage, the timber trestle railway bridge and a number of old oak and peppercorn trees. It is a significant heritage listed building in the Nillumbik Shire.

It was designed by Melbourne architect Greg Burgess and won the Royal Australian Institute of Architects' Institutional Architecture Award in 1995. The setback, height of walls and the roof, materials and colours were chosen to complement its natural setting. 14,100 mudbricks were made locally for the building.

The library foyer incorporates a community art gallery. Exhibitions are managed through the Shire of Nillumbik. The Eltham Toy Library operates out of the multipurpose room.

An extensive re-modelling and renovation took place in 2010, adding more space with the removal of the large circulation desk turning this into a reading corner and adding more computers. A new children's courtyard was also established at that time, designed by Jeavons Landscape Architects in collaboration with Greg Burgess Architects. In 2020, an outdoor artwork Dreaming Mural by Simone Thompson. was installed. In early 2021 a seed library was installed. The library had a minor refurbishment in 2022 which included the replacement of the carpet, updated floor plan, consolidation of staff service points, an increase in shelving for the collection, an increase in charging outlets, study booths and reading seats. The local history collection includes the history of the communities that made up the former Shire of Eltham from the 1840s, including the Shire of Eltham Pioneers Photograph collection held in partnership with Eltham District Historical Society.

A sculpture of local author Alan Marshall by Marcus Skipper welcomes visitors to the library.

Etham Library was rated fifth out of seventeen best libraries for kids across Melbourne in January 2018. In May 2023 protestors and LGBTIQA+ advocates gathered outside the library both supporting and protesting against a drag story time session for IDAHOBIT day. In March 2024 Eltham library was chosen by TimeOut as one of the best ten libraries in Melbourne.

In February 2025, Nillumbik Shire Council installed a Listening Post outside the library which includes a story about the library.

=== Ivanhoe Library 1965-2020 ===
The original Ivanhoe Library opened on 8 October 1965. It featured two main floors and a mezzanine floor. Architects were Leith & Bartlett Pty Ltd and the builders were Neilson & Robinson Pty Ltd, Mordiallic. It was built at a cost of £7,000 and was also at that time the Regional Library headquarters. State government funding for a new Ivanhoe Library was announced by the Minister for Local Government in December 2017, following support for a Living Libraries Infrastructure program. The library was closed on 20 March 2020 due to the COVID-19 pandemic. The building was demolished in June 2020.

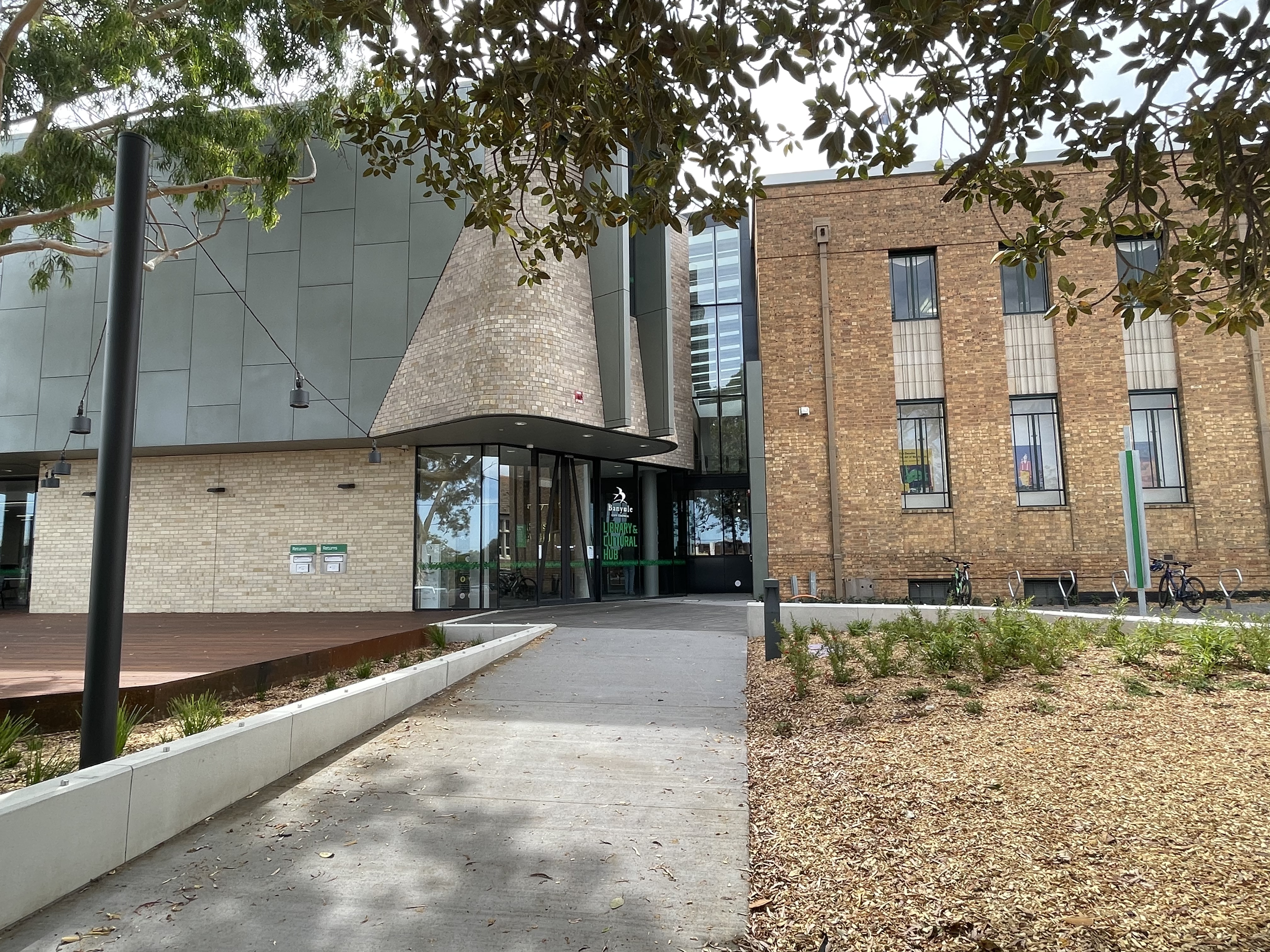
Ivanhoe Library and Cultural Hub, 2021

=== Ivanhoe Library & Cultural Hub ===
Ivanhoe Library is one of three libraries in the City of Banyule. It is located in the Ivanhoe Library & Cultural Hub at 275 Upper Heidelberg Road, Ivanhoe on the same site of the former library building built in 1965 which it replaces. A major project to build a new Ivanhoe library and cultural hub commenced in 2019. It was officially opened to the community on 25 March 2021. The Architect was Croxon Ramsay. It has incorporated a major redevelopment of the existing heritage listed town hall. Buxton Construction were the builders. Its value is stated as $31 million. The building was nominated for a 2022 Victorian Architecture Award under the category of Public Architecture.

The building includes the library, meeting spaces, maternal and child health consulting suites, informal theatrette and several arts spaces. Banyule U3A conduct some of their activities from the meeting room spaces.

Whispers social enterprise cafe provides local community members a work experience opportunity.

The children's area with the theartrette occupies the ground floor. The main part of the library occupies the first floor which includes study spaces, a makerspace and a dedicated room for the local history collection. The local history collection includes history of the former City of Heidelberg, including the themes of early settlement, local institutions, and twentieth century urban development.

=== Lalor Library ===
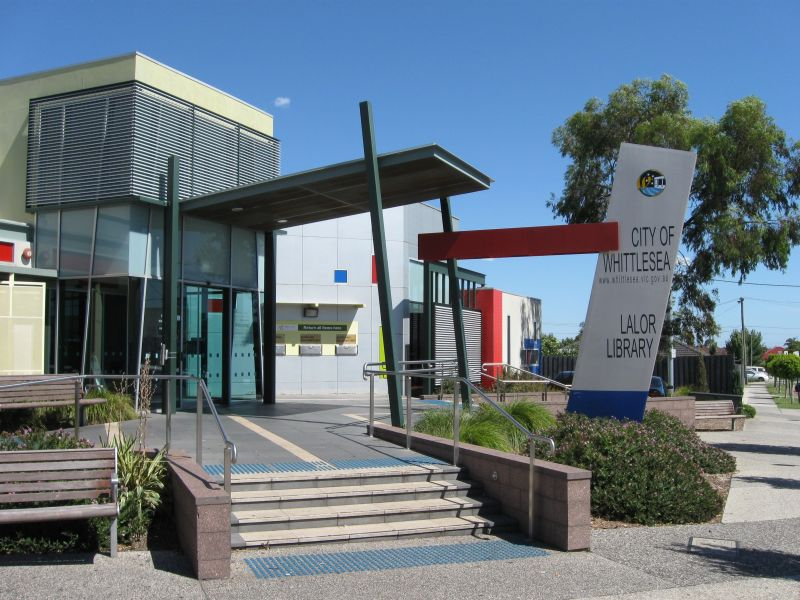
Lalor Library, 2012

Lalor Library is one of five libraries in the City of Whittlesea. It is located in a busy shopping centre in May Road, Lalor. It has a popular toy library.

A temporary building opened on 11 November 1976, followed by the permanent building which finally opened in 1985. New facilities and an extensions took place in 2003. Refurbishments in 2006 included a community art mural created for an inside wall featuring 21 butterflies, each unique, emerging from the pages of a book all made from mosaic tiles by NEAMI artists. Further renovations took place in 2013 when the heating and cooling system was replaced with a climate control system and improvements were made to the public foyer, seating, signage and library toilets. In 2024 the library received a further makeover including the addition of new funiture.

Lalor library is a venue for classes and activities for the Whittlesea U3A.

=== Mernda Library ===
Mernda Library is one of five libraries in the City of Whittlesea and is located within Mernda Town Library in Riverdale Boulevard, Mernda. It is situated within a shopping centre. It opened to the community on 22 January 2024.

=== Mill Park Library ===
Mill Park Library is one of five libraries in the City of Whittlesea, located on Plenty Road, Mill Park. It opened on 23 June 2002 and was built at a cost of $6 million. It was built by Melbourne architects Oaten Stanistreet and was one of Victoria's largest public libraries at the time. It was the first to be built on the concept of a hybrid digital/print library. The library was awarded the Victorian Engineering Excellence Award in October 2003.

Mill Park Library, 2002

The J.W. Payne local history collection reflects major themes in the history of the municipality from the time of traditional Aboriginal occupation to the present.

In 2012 Mill Park Library was the first public library in Victoria to host a digital hub serviced by the National Broadband Network.

In 2019 the City of Whittlesea refurbished the Cafe area, improved the children's area, updated quiet study spaces and meeting rooms, and improved lighting and air-conditioning. Further improvements included the installation of a cubby and breastfeeding nook and increase in the number of seats and tables for use. In July 2019 the library re-opened following the two-month closure and $1 million makeover.

In June 2021 an upgrade was completed which included a new entry forecourt with an accessible ramp, outdoor seats and tables, fitted coloured building lights, new trees and plants and a water harvesting system was installed. The second stage of the upgrade included the construction on an outdoor learning area and meeting space with sensory play elements and a community garden. Accessible gender-neutral toilet facilities were upgraded.

Chancez Cafe at Mill Park library is a partnership between Araluen, City of Whittlesea and Yarra Plenty Regional Library.

=== murnong Library ===
A small library is located in the City of Whittlesea's murnong Community Centre in Donnybrook. It opened in February 2026.

=== Rosanna Library 1973-2023 ===
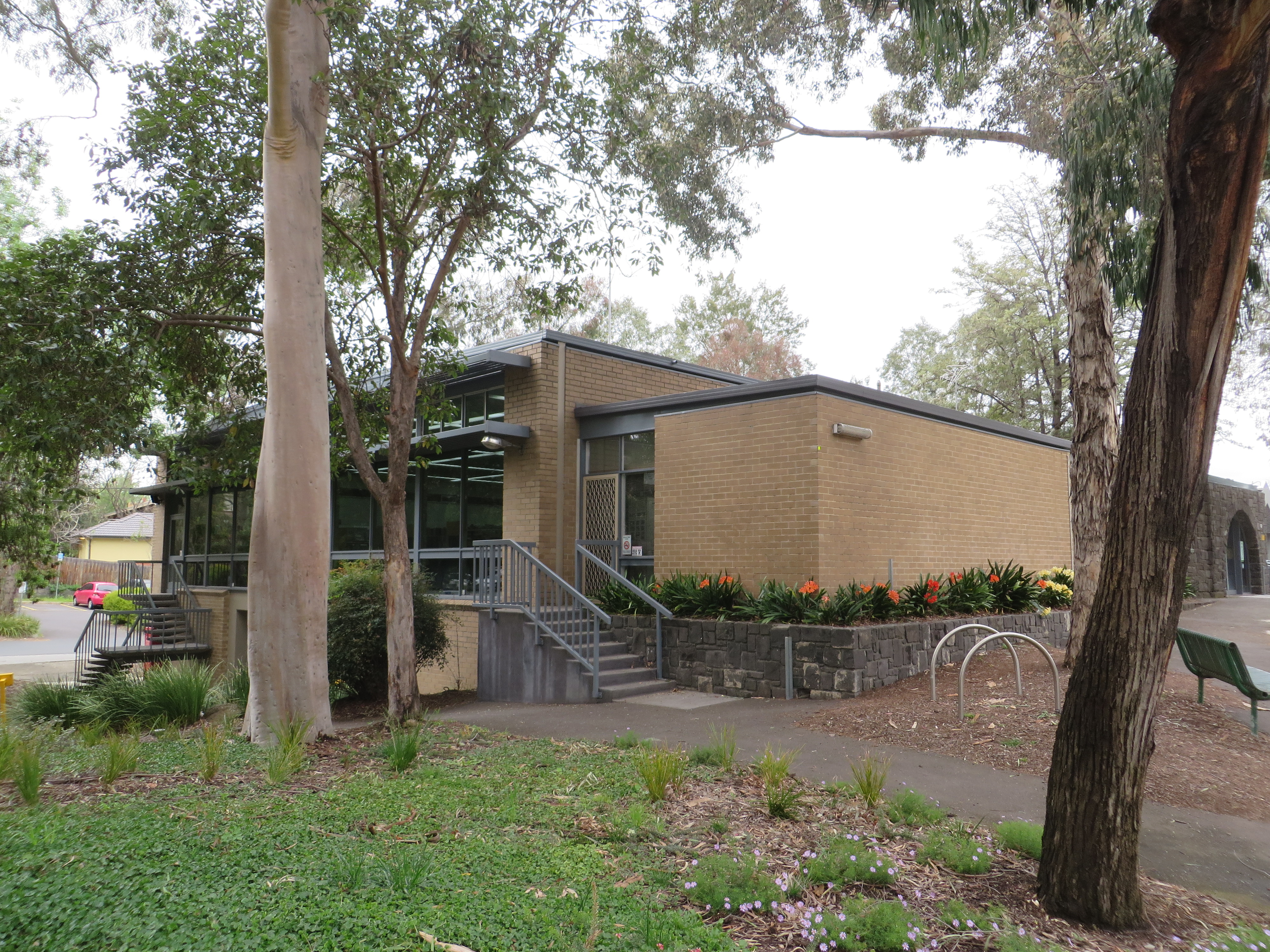
Rosanna Library, 2019

Rosanna Library is one of three libraries in the City of Banyule. The original library was located at 72 Turnham Avenue on the corner of Douglas Street. It was opened on 15 August 1973. It was built with a bluestone exterior at a cost of $140,000. It had an open floor design. At that time, the City of Heidelberg purchased the neighbouring corner property on Douglas Street. This was eventually demolished and the area landscaped.

The library closed in early 2023 and a temporary pop-up library opened in Beetham Parade Rosanna.

=== Rosanna Library Redevelopment and Reopening ===
In December 2020, Banyule City Council entered an agreement with Woolworths who owns adjoining land to the Council land where the library was situated. Initial concepts were developed to show what a proposed two-story building could look like and how the spaces would be used. In August 2021 the Council gave notice of its intention to sell part of the land which the library occupies to Fabcot Pty Ltd (wholly owned subsidiary of Woolworths Limited) to facilitate the development of a Woolworths supermarket, In return Fabcot will construct and deliver a new library to agreed specifications and construction cost. The new library will be a three-story building with expanded children's area, co-working and study spaces, community meeting rooms and other services and spaces. The redevelopment of Rosanna Library was completed in late 2025, and the new Rosanna Library officially opened on 21 January 2026.

=== Thomastown Library ===
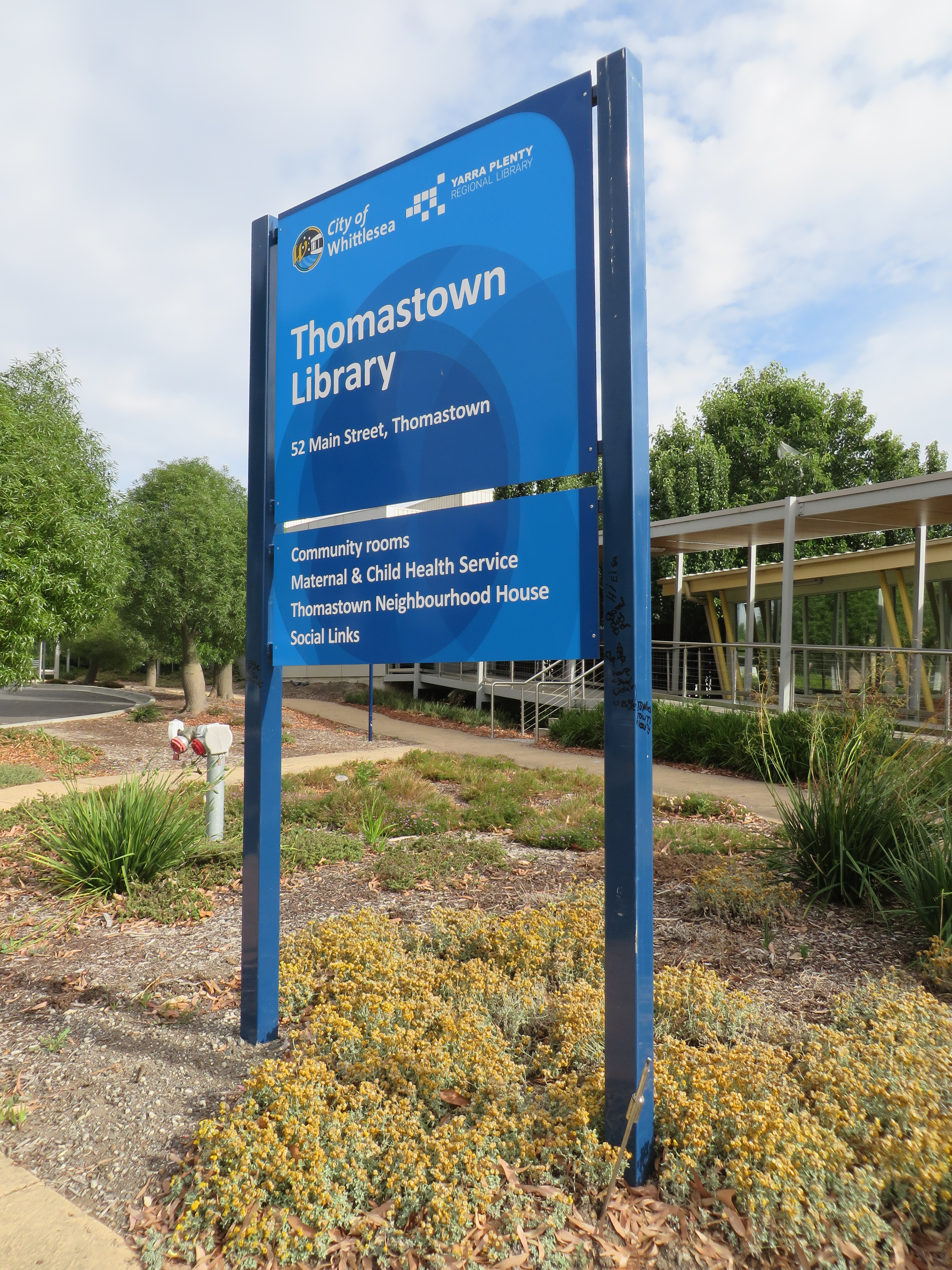
Thomastown Library

Thomastown Library is one of five libraries in the City of Whittlesea. The library is located beside the Thomastown Recreation & Aquatic Centre and Edgars Creek Trail and walking distance to Westgarthtown.

The library opened in April 1993. In 2005 Thomastown Library was extended to include meeting rooms, a computer room with 16 terminals, a landscaped courtyard, storage area and kitchenette and revamped children's area which was lauded as a community hub and a model for community projects across Victoria by the State Government. Three art projects were also implemented at this time which included an outdoor mosaic work incorporating the themes of water, migration and Edgar's Creek, a 10-metre long curved glass entry wall and circulation desk windows featuring images of local people and places and the teenage area features images of local teenagers involved in a number of activities. In early 2016 building extension works took place for a multiple purpose room and office space and office reconfiguration works to provide two maternal & child health centre consulting rooms, waiting area and program room within the community hub. A refurbishment project took place in 2024 which included a new maker space, installation of custom-built workstations with cribs for parents, single study booths and dedicated study and quiet areas.

=== Watsonia Library ===
Watsonia Library is one of three libraries in the City of Banyule.

It was built by the former Shire of Diamond Valley and opened in November 1988. It was designed by architect Mr Peter Hirst. A renovation and extension took place in 2002 which included a new children's area, quiet study reading space, areas for accessing information technology and a community meeting area. A public art installation was also commissioned by the City of Banyule. The Wings of the Waa Mojety (Crow) was installed on the library building by the artist, Andrea Tomaselli. It represents the Wurundjeri people, the native custodians of the land as well as music, and other symbols of educational and social art forms. A multimedia artwork: "Unrestricted Under the Sea" was also produced and installed in front of the meeting room. The piece was a result of a partnership between YPRL, Banyule City Council and Neami, an organisation that provides a mental health support service. A Japanese courtyard garden was installed in June 2012. In 2015, a further refurbishment took place which included the addition of a lab bar where library users can access free Wi-Fi, new carpet, shelving and furnishings, an updated children's library, interior and exterior painting and improved access to public computers. Watsonia library hosts a seed library which was installed in early 2021. In 2024/2025 the library has been impacted by the Watsonia Town Square development.

=== Whittlesea Library ===
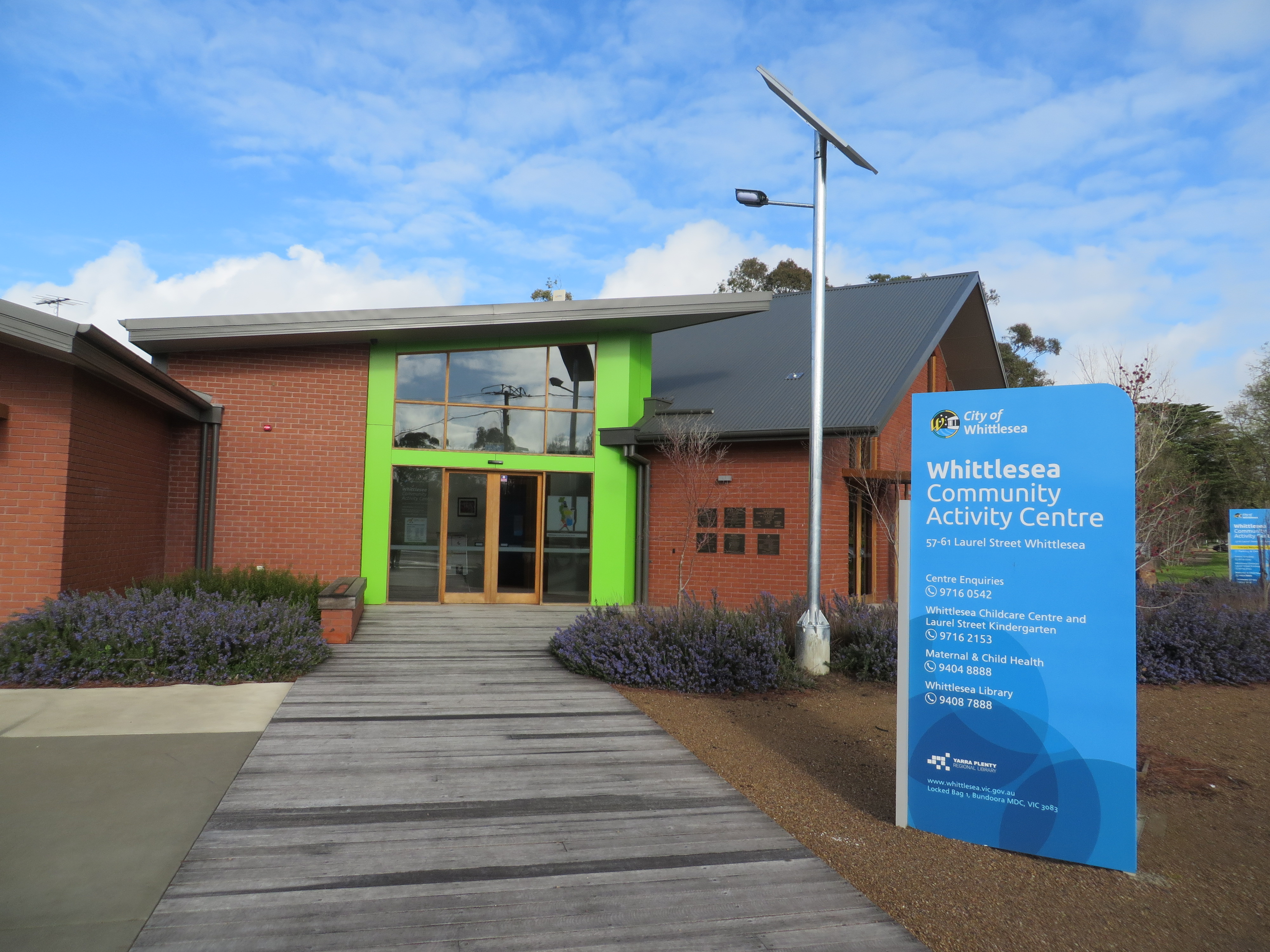
Whittlesea Community Activity Centre Whittlesea Library, 2016

The Whittlesea Community Activity Centre and Library was officially opened on Saturday 18 October 2015. The library is one of five libraries in the City of Whittlesea Whittlesea Library was funded by the City of Whittlesea and a grant from the Victorian State Government's Living Libraries infrastructure program. The library is 250 sqm and supports a collection of about 19,000 items. Special features of the building include a children's outdoor reading space, a reading lounge with a gas log fire and a media area designed for teenagers The Centre includes meeting rooms and the main Memorial hall which can seat up to 200 people. The hall includes four Victorian Ash Architectural Trusses spanning 13 meters long. In 2016 Whittlesea Library was the first public library in Australia to use an interactive robot to connect aged care and house-bound residents. It featured an iPad mounted on a telescopic pole.

=== Mobile Library ===
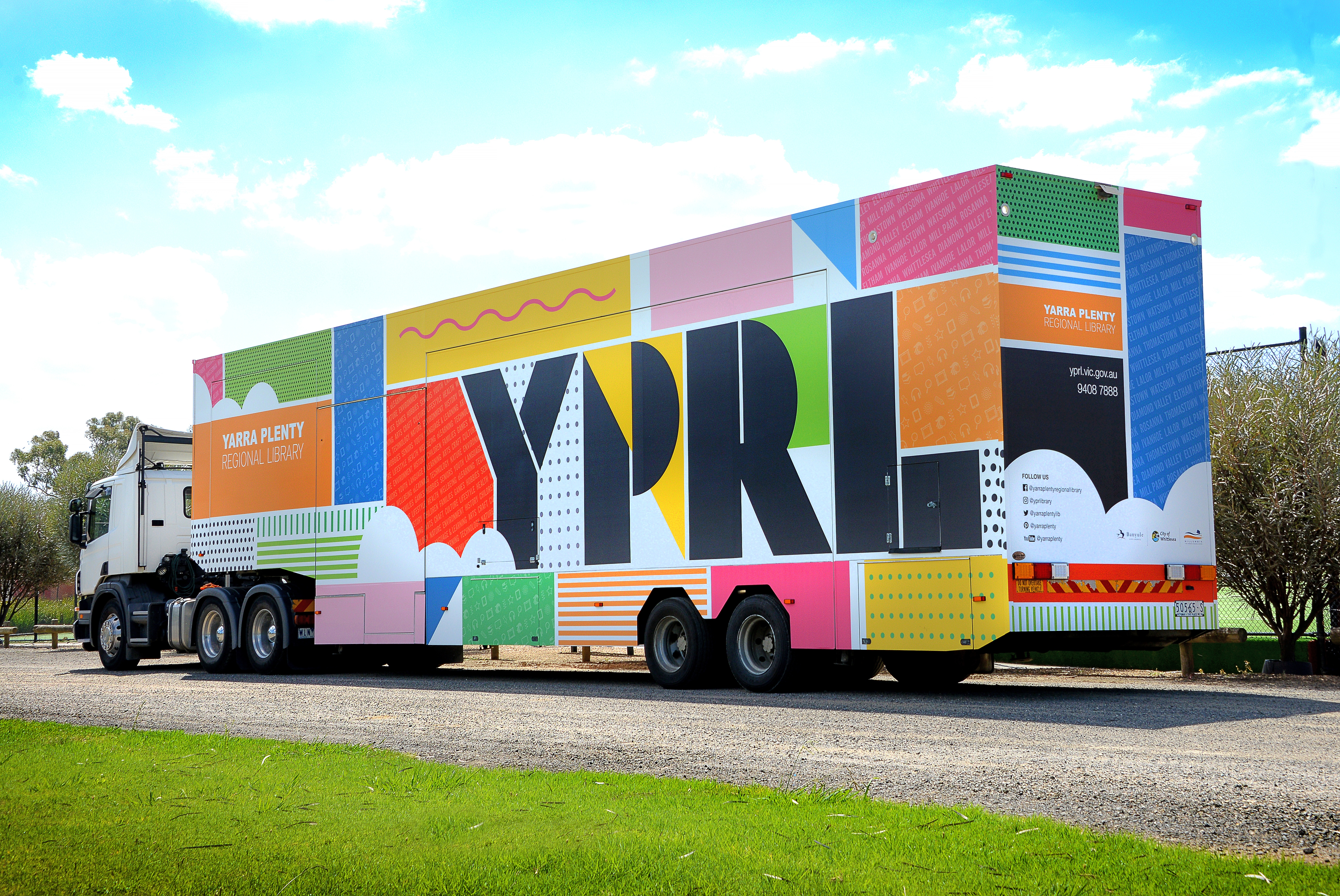
Mobile Library, 2018

The mobile library's schedule includes stops at Epping, Wollert, Donnybrook, Doreen, Panton Hill, St Andrews, Hurstbridge, North Warrandyte, Kangaroo Ground, Diamond Creek, Arthurs Creek, Yarrambat, West Heidelberg and Christmas Hills.

The mobile library's history began with the City of Heidelberg's new bookmobile service launched in October 1954.

In early 2018 the mobile library had a considerable refurbishment, including new graphics on the side and back of the vehicle and change over of staff after the retirement of two long-term employees of YPRL. In January 2019 YPRL took delivery of a 2018 Mercedes-Benz Actros 2646. It has a Euro 6 engine with 460 hp (343 kW), 6 × 4 drive line, a 12-speed automated transmission with a dual axle trailer. The entire vehicle is 19 metres long. The trailer was especially made and extends sideways to nearly the double floor space inside.

=== Outreach Service ===
A home library service continues to operates for people unable to attend the library in person. YPRL introduced a new Mercedes Benz Sprinter Outreach vehicle in August 2024 which visits visits nursing homes, retirement villages and assisted living accommodation facilities.

== Pop-Ups ==
=== Bellfield Community Hub Click & Collect Service ===
The service is located at 15 Daphne Cres., Bellfield.

=== Galada Community Centre Hub Click and Collect ===
A pop-up click and collect service was established at the City of Whitltesea's Galada Community Centre in Epping in the first quarter of 2022.

=== Hurstbridge Community Hub Click & Collect Service ===
In September 2020, YPRL's first library hub was established in the foyer of the Hurstbridge Community Hub in partnership with Nillumbik Shire Council. In 2026, the opening hours for access to the service expanded and StoryTime and TechHelp sessions were introduced.

=== Kirrip Hub Click & Collect Service ===
The service is located at 135 De Rossi Boulevard, Wollert and opened in late 2024.

== See also ==
- Libraries in Melbourne
