= Mernda =

- Suburb
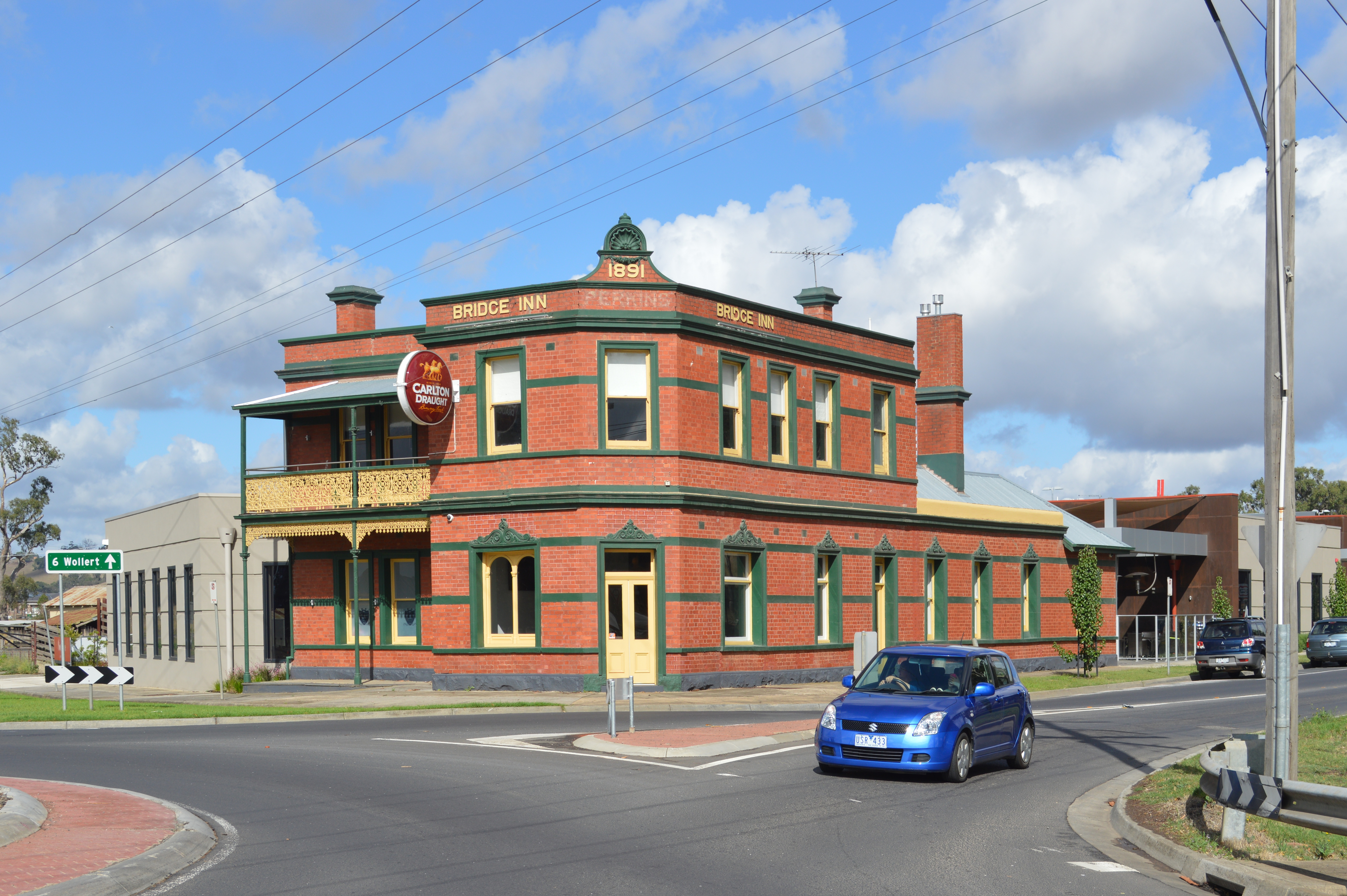
- Bridge Inn Hotel, built in 1869

- Interactive map of Mernda
- Coordinates: 37.609°S 145.093°E
- Country: Australia
- State: Victoria
- City: Melbourne
- LGA: City of Whittlesea
- Location: 26 km (16 mi) from Melbourne; 10 km (6.2 mi) from Hurstbridge

Government
  - State electorate: Yan Yean
  - Federal division: McEwen
- Elevation: 169 m (554 ft)

Population
  - Total: 23,369 (2021 census)
- Postcode: 3754
Suburbs around Mernda
	Yan Yean
Wollert	Mernda	Doreen
Epping	South Morang	Yarrambat

Mernda is a suburb of Melbourne, Victoria, Australia, 26 km north-east of Melbourne's central business district, located within the City of Whittlesea local government area. Mernda recorded a population of 23,369 at the 2021 census.

== History ==
The first structure by European settlers was built in 1841 and bore the title of The Bridge Inn. That same year a small flour mill was built on the Plenty River. These town enterprises provided the nucleus of a village which was initially known as Morang. The Post Office opened on 19 February 1875 as Yan Yean. Situated near the Yan Yean Reservoir and Yan Yean, the popularity of the region for recreation led Morang citizens to press for a name change. This was granted and from 1893 to 1913 the township was known as South Yan Yean. In 1913 the locality was renamed Mernda. The post office and the railway station were also renamed. The name means young girl (derived from murmurdik) in Woiwurrung, the local language of the Wurundjeri. In 1913, Mernda contained a school, a Methodist church, a Catholic church, a bakery/store, a railway station and a mechanics' institute, as well as the Bridge Inn Hotel. Mernda was proclaimed a township on 26 April 1928 by the Governor, Lord Somers.

A bluestone house, known as Carome was built in the 1860s near a flour mill on the Plenty River. The area was used for mixed farming at that time and later as a dairy farm and horse stud. Multiple mills took advantage of the Plenty River, including the Janefield mill and Mayfield Flour Mill, used as the basis of a test case of virtual reality reconstruction for public engagement with rural heritage.

== Today ==
From the early 2000s, the area began being suburbanised with several new estates being constructed. The suburb of Mernda consists of a number of new and developing housing subdivisions offering the new communities of Mernda Villages, Settlers Hill, Everton Gardens, Bridge Inn Rise, Berry Lane, Mernda Ridge, Woodland Waters, Hawkstowe, Riverdale and Renaissance Rise.

In 2009 Working Heritage acquired the Carome property and repaired and updated it for community use. Carome is currently home to a cafe and community garden.

A strategic transport plan developed by the Victorian State Government had earmarked Mernda to be 're-connected' to the rail system by 2027; however, the 'South Morang and Mernda Rail Alliance' sought an earlier completion date of 2014 due to rising population and congestion in the area. Passenger trains recommenced to Mernda on 26 August 2018 for the first time in almost 60 years.

In November 2021 Major Roads Projects Victoria appointed a construction partner for The Bridge Inn Road Upgrade between Plenty and Yan Yean roads. The project will add extra lanes in each direction, install traffic lights, build a bridge over the Plenty River and upgrade the existing bridge, install safety barriers, upgrade intersections and build a new shared walking and cycling path. The road will be complete by 2025.

In April 2023 the historic Wollert Methodist Church was relocated to Carome Homestead as part of the Epping Road Upgrade project.

== Education ==
Mernda is located 15 minutes' drive to RMIT University Bundoora Campus & approximately 30 minutes to La Trobe University. Mernda has two primary schools; Mernda Primary School and St Joseph's Catholic Primary School. The two higher secondary colleges Mernda Hills Christian College and Ivanhoe Grammar School plenty campus co-educational from Prep to Year 12 are located in Bridge Inn Road in Doreen. Plenty Valley Christian College is also a Prep to Year 12 co-educational private school located 5 minutes drive from Mernda. In December 2015 construction of two new government schools began. Mernda Central P-12 College located on Breadalbane Avenue and Mernda Park Primary School located on Riverdale Boulevard started to open in January 2017.

== Sports ==
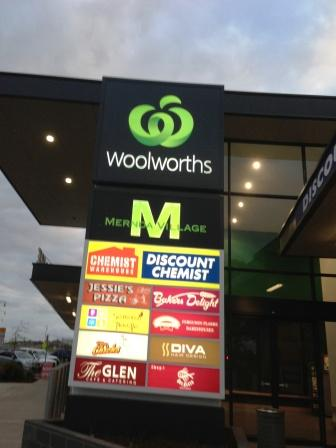
Mernda Villages Shopping Centre

The Mernda Football Club, also known as the Demons, has played for more than a century in either the Whittlesea District Football League, the Diamond Valley Football League or the Northern Football League, and won 18 premierships.

The Mernda Cricket Club has regularly won Championships in both the JIKA Cricket Association and the Diamond Valley Cricket Association. Mernda won its first Barclay Shield in season 2008–09, two years after being promoted to A-Grade. Mernda also enjoyed success in the lower grades of the DVCA during that season, winning the E Grade premiership.

Mernda Dragons play rugby league in NRL Victoria.

Mernda Junior Netball Club plays Netball in the local community, currently with 8 teams of local girls and boys. In 2020, their under 11's Blaze won the division 2 premiership and under 13's Fury won the division 1 premiership.

== Population ==
In the 2011 Census, there were 6,508 people in Mernda (State Suburbs) of these, 49.3% were male and 50.7% were female. Aboriginal and Torres Strait Islander people made up 0.9% of the population. The median age of people in Mernda (State Suburbs) was 29 years. Children aged 0 – 14 years made up 25.2% of the population and people aged 65 years and over made up 3.2% of the population. In Mernda (state suburbs) 28.2% of people were attending an educational institution. Of these, 33.9% were in primary school, 19.0% in secondary school and 19.3% in a tertiary or technical institution in Mernda (State Suburbs), with 76.1% of people born in Australia.

The most common countries of birth were England 2.9%, India 1.9%, Italy 1.3%, New Zealand 1.2% and Sri Lanka 1.1%.

At the 2016 census, Mernda had a population of 16,458.

== Retail ==
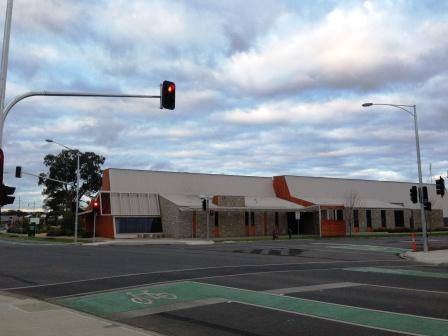
Mernda Villages Community Centre

The 4000 square metre Mernda Villages Shopping Centre is located at the corner of Kalkallo Way and Mernda Village Drive and features a Woolworths supermarket and 10 speciality stores. The centre also includes 180 car spaces and bicycle facilities. Mernda is located just a 10-minute drive to Westfield Plenty Valley Shopping Centre and Pacific Epping.

Mernda Junction Shopping Centre opened in February 2019, and is located on the corner of Plenty Road and Bridge Inn Road.

The Mernda Town Centre Woolworths led shopping centre opened on 27 October 2022.

The Mernda Villages post office is located on Mernda Village Drive.

== Transport ==
Mernda is currently served by the Mernda railway station, the terminus of the Mernda railway line. Formerly, it served the old Mernda Station (formerly South Yan Yean), and Rail Motor Stopping Place No. 26. These stations used to serve the now demolished Whittlesea Line. The suburb is also served by numerous bus routes.

== Medical facilities ==
Mernda Village Medical & Dental is located along Mernda Village Drive opposite Woolworths. Maternal Health Services is located in the Mernda Villages Community Activity Centre.

Mernda Junction Medical with Pathology on-site located within Mernda Junction Shopping Centre.

Bridge Inn Medical is in Mernda Town Centre.

== Community Facilities ==
Mernda Villages Community Activity Centre, provides an early learning centre, Child care, Maternal Health Services and an array of activities available at the new state of the art Mernda Villages Community Activity Centre.

Mernda Library is located within Mernda Town Centre. It opened on 22 January 2024 and is managed by Yarra Plenty Regional Library. The library contains a bespoke, carefully curated collection including Book Express titles and language collections for both Hindi and Punjabi. There is also a variety of helpful facilities including a free tea and coffee station, community lounge, public computers and charging lockers for personal devices.

== Twin towns ==
- San Salvador, El Salvador
