= Bears Castle =

Faux castle in Victoria, Australia

Coordinates: 37°32′18″S 145°8′6″E

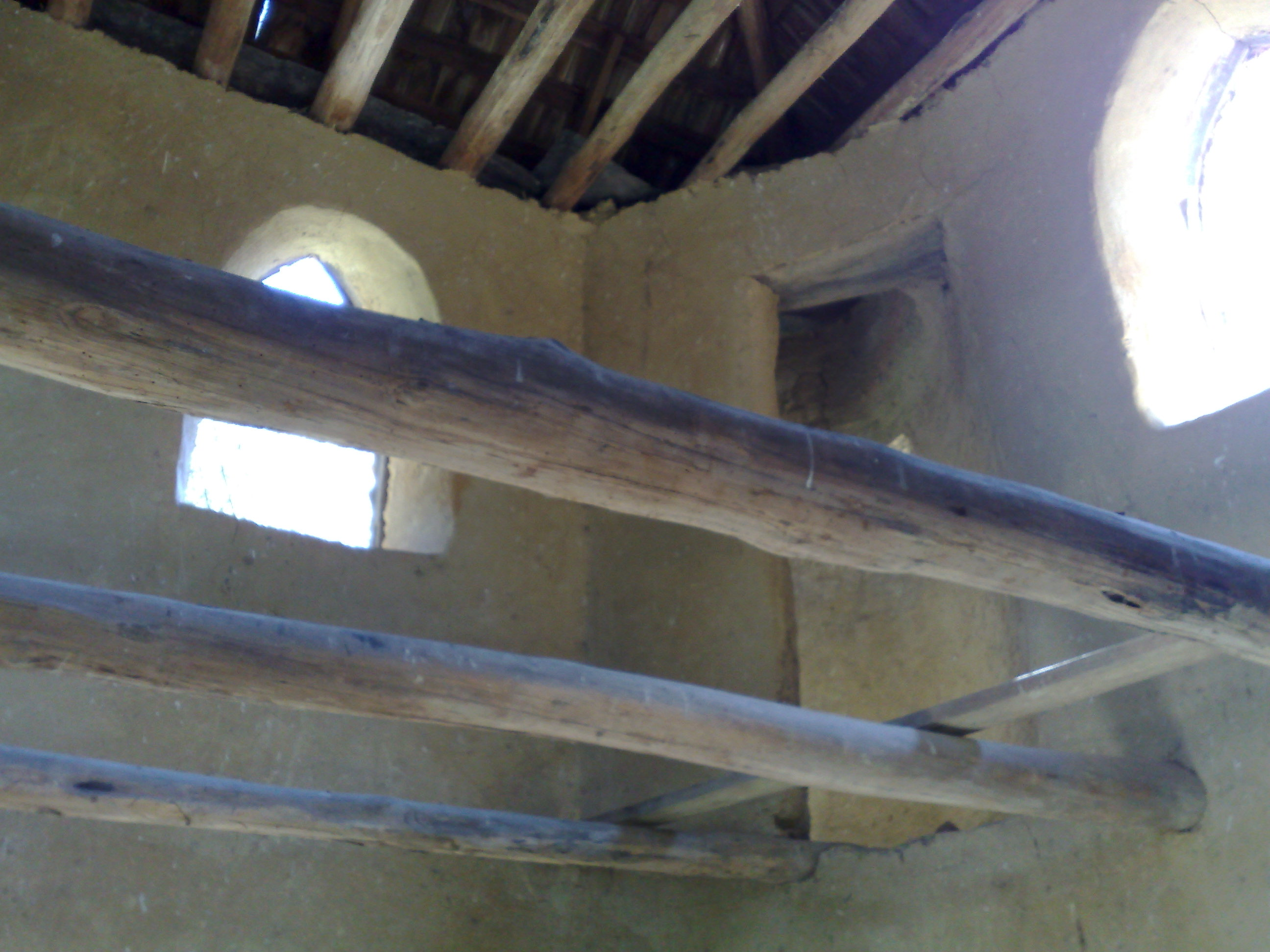
Bear's Castle inside

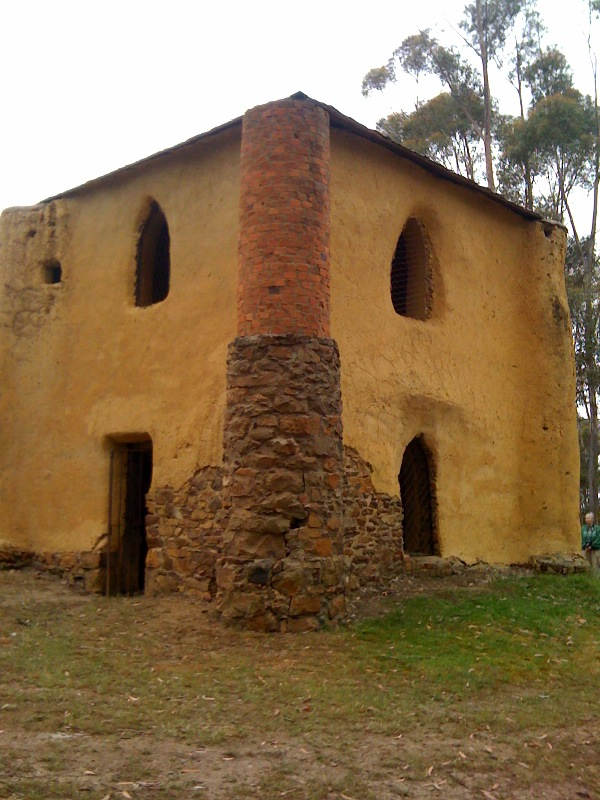
A photo of Bears Castle, shot while on a guided tour in November 2009.

Bear's Castle is a small faux castle (fortified homestead) constructed in approx 1846 in Yan Yean, Victoria, Australia.

== Construction ==
The castle was a cob construction from mud and clay with planks of timber in-between the layer of cob with a stone base for foundations. Large tree timbers provide a form for the windows (inverted tree forks) and straight trunks provide support for the first floor. It was constructed in about 1846 by two men named Hannaford and Edwards, each of whom had recently arrived from Devon, England, where cob was a common building technique used to build the castle. It was built for the pastoralist John Bear. The castle is approximately 12 square metres in area and has parapets and turrets on each corner.

== History ==
According to the 1975 History of Whittlesea Shire - The Plenty - A Centenary History of the Whittlesea Shire:

"A reminder of the bygone days remains beside the Yan Yean Reservoir. On departure from his holding for several weeks, John Bear was asked by his employees what work they should undertake. The story goes that his reply was, "Build me a castle". Taking the direction literally, Hannaford, with John Edwards as a puddler, set out to build a 'castle' of mud walls with forked timber for doorways and window openings. Small turrets, one with circular stairs, are set at the corners of the building, originally covered with shingles. The MMBW, recognizing the historic value of the structure, referred to as Bears Castle - have recovered it in galvanized roofing."

"When James Duffy came as manager for Thomas Bear in 1865, he and his wife lived in this old castle while a house was built for them."

The castle served as a temporary residence for Thomas Bear's farm manager, Joseph Owen, and their family from about 1865. Thomas was John Bear's son.

Some theories about the reason the castle was created include:

- providing a bolt hole in case of attack — John Bear's wife had been held up by the Plenty bushrangers in 1842, and John was often absent on business;
- a lookout, as it is on the top of a rise and the land has been cleared of trees, which gives a good view over the Plenty River Valley;
- refuge from bushfires;
- providing protection from the weather for shepherds.

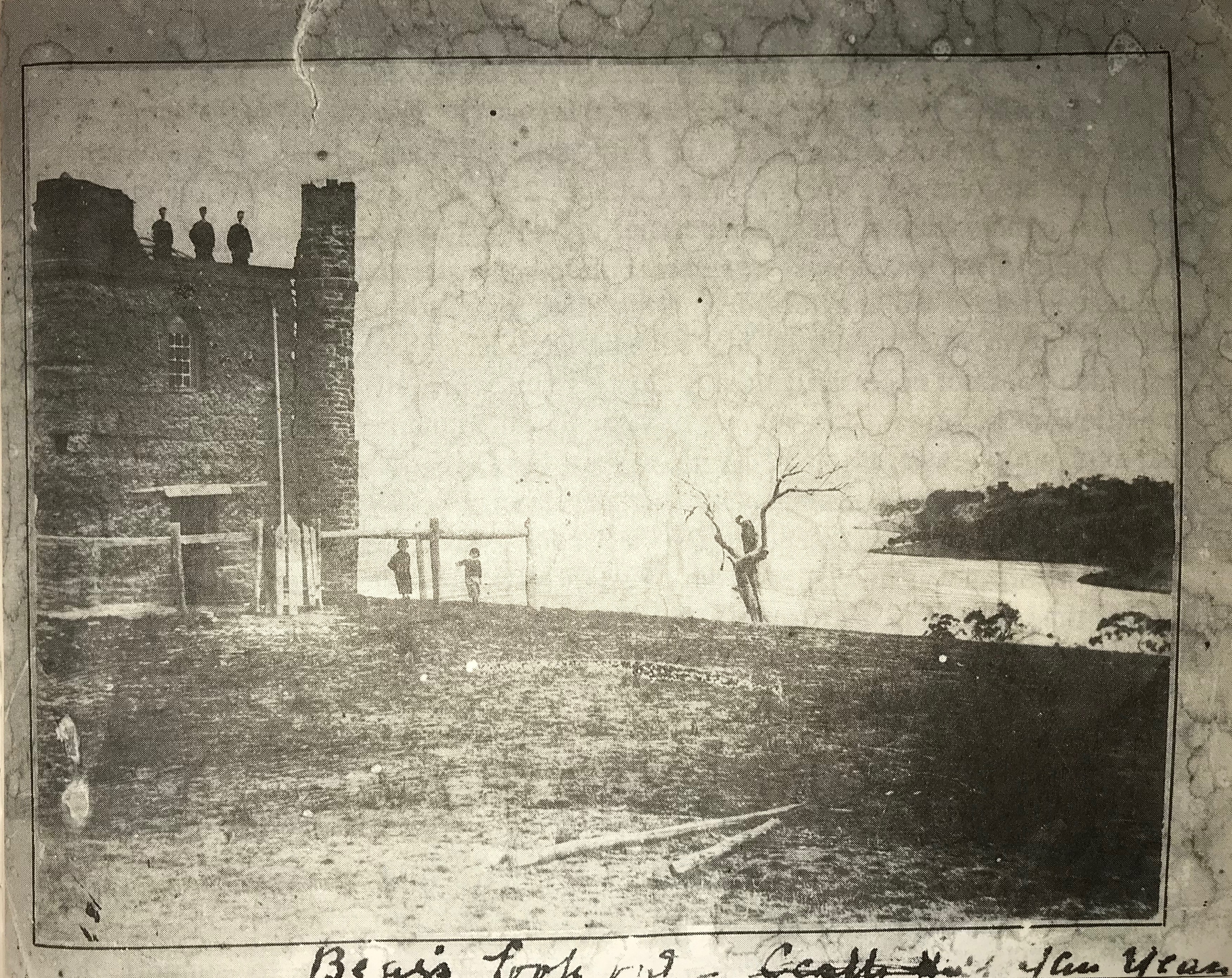
Bear's Castle, Lookout Castle Hill Yan Yean c1870

In about 1900, the parapets and a castellated tower topping a corner turret were removed. In the 1970s, the walls were rendered with chicken wire and mud to protect the building against decay. The earlier walls can be seen in the circa 1870 picture, which includes five of Thomas Bear's children. The Yan Yean Reservoir can be seen in the background.

The castle was added to the Victorian Heritage Register in 1998.

As the castle is in a protected water catchment area for Melbourne, access is restricted. The Whittlesea Historical Society has at times arranged a guided visit to the site. These are infrequent and may occur once a year.

The castle has two stories; however, there is no flooring on the second story.

Tours of the site are still available.
