= Eltham District Historical Society =

Historical preservation society in Australia

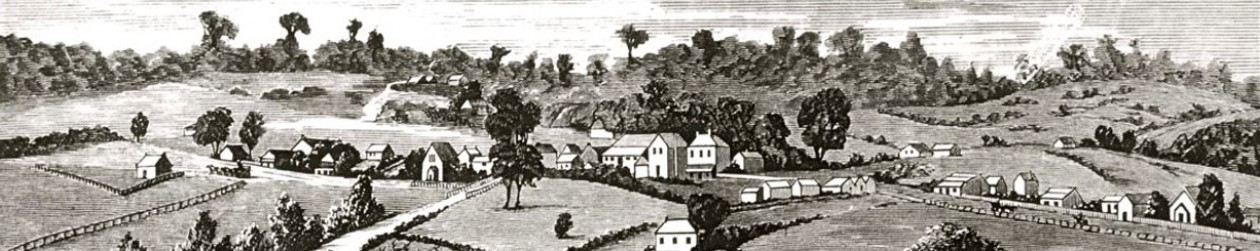
Eltham. Wood engraving by Samuel Calvert (1828–1913). Published in the Illustrated Australian News, December 26, 1884

Eltham District Historical Society is a community organisation devoted to the collection, preservation and sharing of stories about the local history of the Eltham district in the north east of Melbourne, Victoria, Australia. Its geographic area of interest extends from Lower Plenty and Montmorency to Kangaroo Ground. It also maintains an interest in the former Shire of Eltham and holds memorabilia from the former Eltham Shire Council. It is located in the Shire of Nillumbik local government area. It also encourages conservation of significant places, spaces and documents for future generations. It is an affiliated member of the Royal Historical Society of Victoria and the Association of Eastern Historical Societies. It is an historical society managed by volunteers.

== History ==
The Shire of Eltham Historical Society was established in 1967. Shire of Eltham Councillor Charis Pelling was its first President. It was incorporated in 1988. Following the restructure of local government in Victoria in 1994, the Society changed its name to Eltham District Historical Society. Members have included the photographer Peter Bassett-Smith.

== Local History Centre ==
The Society occupies the former historic Policeman's residence in the Eltham Justice Precinct. at 728 Main Road, Eltham. It was constructed in 1859–60 in brick as a single-story residence consisting of five rooms. It has a projecting front room and timber verandah. It discontinued being a police residence in 1952 when the Shire of Eltham lands department used it as a local office. After that it was used by Council's parks and environment department. The building is registered on the Victorian Heritage Register. The detached weatherboard building situated beside the Local History Centre is a 1980s replica of the original police station which was located in the same position but later demolished. In 2019, the Society were able to take over use of the building for storage and for use as part of its education program. A historic portable lockup was moved to the site in March 2001. The former police quarters, together with rear brick stables and nearby courthouse form the Eltham Justice Precinct. In May 2020 Heritage Victoria recommended that the site be amended in the Victorian Heritage Register.

== Collection ==
The Society maintains an extensive collection of local historical records including photographs, maps and historical documents. In 2018, the earliest known rate books for Eltham (1858-1863), the oldest items in the collection were donated to Public Records Office Victoria. The Society is co-custodian of the Shire of Eltham Pioneers Photograph Collection in partnership with Yarra Plenty Regional Library. In 2013, the library was a recipient of a 2012-2013 Local History Grant to digitise and catalogue this collection. The Victorian Collections platform is used to manage its mainly paper-based collection, where information can be found on over 14,000 collection items.

== Activities ==
The Society collects, shares and advocates for preserving local heritage in its locality. It participates in community displays. It has regularly contributed articles and provided expertise to the local media on subjects of local historical interest. The Society hosts public meetings for its members and visitors at which guest speakers present information and ideas that are relevant to the history of the Eltham. Regular historic walks are held four times a year. A newsletter is published six times a year. The Society was instrumental in gathering photographs and information and publishing Pioneers and Painters: One Hundred years of Eltham and its Shire by Alan Marshall in 1971. in 1979 the Society applied to the Historic Buildings Preservation Council to preserve an old pioneers cottage.

As part of Victoria's 150th anniversary celebrations in November 1985, the Society planted a time capsule in the grounds of the Eltham Community and Reception Centre near the original location of the Eltham town centre. In 1998 the Society moved its records into the former Eltham Police residence of the Eltham Justice precinct and established the Local History Centre. In 1992 a sub-committee of the Society was formed that led to the independent establishment of the Andrew Ross Museum, Kangaroo Ground after the historical teacher's residence in the grounds of the Kangaroo Ground Primary School became available. In 1999 A Chronology of known local events 1838-1998 was published and donated to local schools and libraries. A third edition was published in 2002. The Tower of Remembrance and War Memorial Park on Garden Hill at Kangaroo Ground, Victoria was also first published in 2002 and updated in 2010.

The Society participated in a program of events for Heritage Week in the Shire of Nillumbik with eight other historical societies in 2004. In 2005, EDHS was a successful recipient of funds in the State Government's Local History Grant Program. They contributed and supported the publication of Nillumbik: Now and Then by Marguerite Marshall in 2008.

In 2013 the Society led a project to officially name the land at 2 Bell Street, Eltham "Fabbro Fields" in recognition of its site history. This application was successful.

In 2015 a new website was launched. In 2015 EDHS contributed to the Nillumbik Shire Council's publication Nillumbik Heritage Guide and the follow-up digital guide which was published in 2020. In 2017 photos from its collection were used in the Eltham Cemetery's public art project Artistic Recollections. As a member of the Yarra Plenty Heritage Group, the Society contributed to the Looking Back, Looking Forward Exhibition which ran 5 December 2019 – 6 January 2020.

In 2024, the Society consulted with Nillumbik Shire Council during the restoration of six Heidelberg School Artists Trail signs in Eltham representing the work of Walter Withers. Further collaboration with the Council culminated in the launch of the Little Eltham Walking brochure and content for a Listening Post located outside Eltham library, both of which were launched in February 2025.

Images from the Society's collection are on Jigsaw Planet.

== Awards and recognition ==
Committee of Management members have had their long term service recognised via the Royal Historical Society of Victoria annual awards of Merit recognition scheme including long time Secretary Russell Yeoman in 1998 and Presidents Sue Law in 2006, Harry Gilham in 2009, Jim Connor in 2019 and Vice President Peter Pidgeon in 2021.

The Society's 50th anniversary in 2017 was acknowledged by Vicki Ward MP Member for Eltham in the Parliament of Victoria.

The Society was awarded the Shire of Nillumbik Community Group of the Year on Australia Day January 26, 2018.

Inaugural member Russell Yeoman was acknowledged for his 50 years service as Secretary by Vicki Ward MP Member for Eltham in the Parliament of Victoria in August 2019.

The occasion of the publication of the Society's 250th newsletter was acknowledged by Vicki Ward MP Member for Eltham in the Parliament of Victoria in February 2020.
