= Yan Yean =

- Town
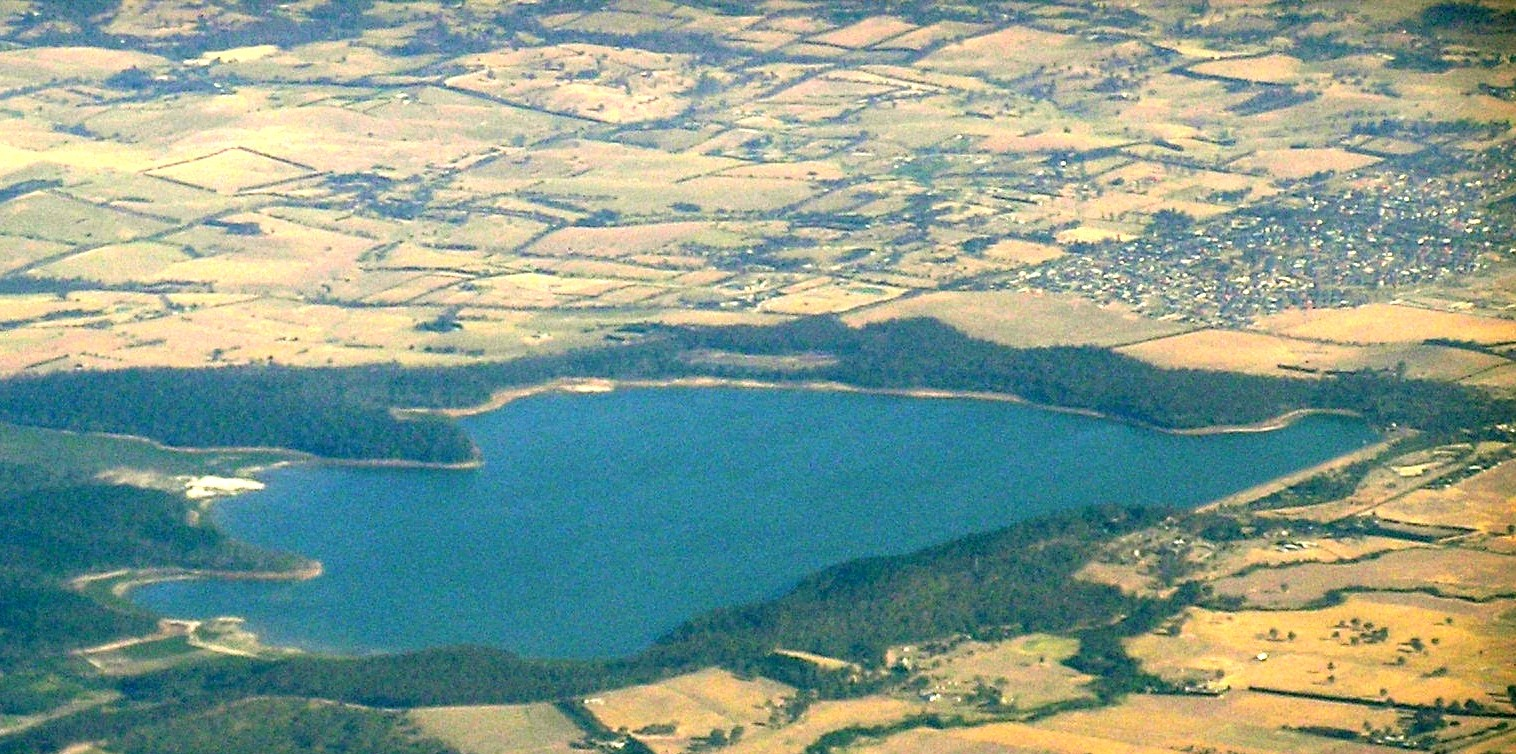
- Yan Yean Reservoir

- Interactive map of Yan Yean
- Coordinates: 37.571°S 145.108°E
- Country: Australia
- State: Victoria
- LGAs: City of Whittlesea; Shire of Nillumbik
- Location: 34 km (21 mi) from Melbourne

Government
  - State electorates: Yan Yean; Eildon
  - Federal division: McEwen
- Elevation: 150 m (490 ft)

Population
  - Total: 246 (2021 census)
- Postcode: 3755
Localities around Yan Yean
Eden Park	Whittlesea	Kinglake West
Woodstock	Yan Yean	Arthurs Creek
Wollert	Mernda	Doreen

Yan Yean is a locality in Melbourne, Victoria, Australia, 34 km north-east of Melbourne's central business district, located within the City of Whittlesea and Shire of Nillumbik local government areas. Yan Yean recorded a population of 246 at the 2021 census.

Yan Yean contains Yan Yean Reservoir. Melbourne's first reservoir, a 560 hectare lake with a capacity of 30,000 megalitres, was first established in December 1853 and provides water to Melbourne's northern and central suburbs. A park around the reservoir, managed by Parks Victoria, offers picnic, barbecue and walking facilities.

== History ==
Originally Yan Yean occupied quite a large area, and the first Yan Yean Post Office opened on 1 March 1859 and was replaced by Morang in 1861. The next Yan Yean Post Office opened in 1875 and was renamed Yan Yean South in 1892 (later Mernda). A Barber's Creek office (opened 1876) was renamed Yan Yean Railway Station in 1892, then Yan Yean in 1907 and closed in 1974.

== Today ==
Yan Yean is the home of Bears Castle.

The Northern Melbourne Institute of TAFE operate a 200 hectare training property at Yan Yean dedicated to training students in cattle and deer farming, aquaculture and the production of medicinal herbs and essential oils.

Golfers play at the Growling Frog Golf Course on Donnybrook Road.

The Yan Yean Tennis Club is a 6 tennis court District level tennis club at TH Hurrey Reserve in Yan Yean, where a $3.9 million refurbishment began in 2017.

Yan Yean also contains a cemetery, fruit and berry farm, stock feed and a tin shop.

== Future ==
Victoria's Big Build includes ongoing work to heavily upgrade Yan Yean Road running from Diamond Creek, likely due to Yan Yean being highly likely to be developed in the coming decades, following the ongoing development of Doreen and Mernda to the South.
