= Hurstbridge, Victoria =

Township in Victoria, Australia

Hurstbridge
- Town
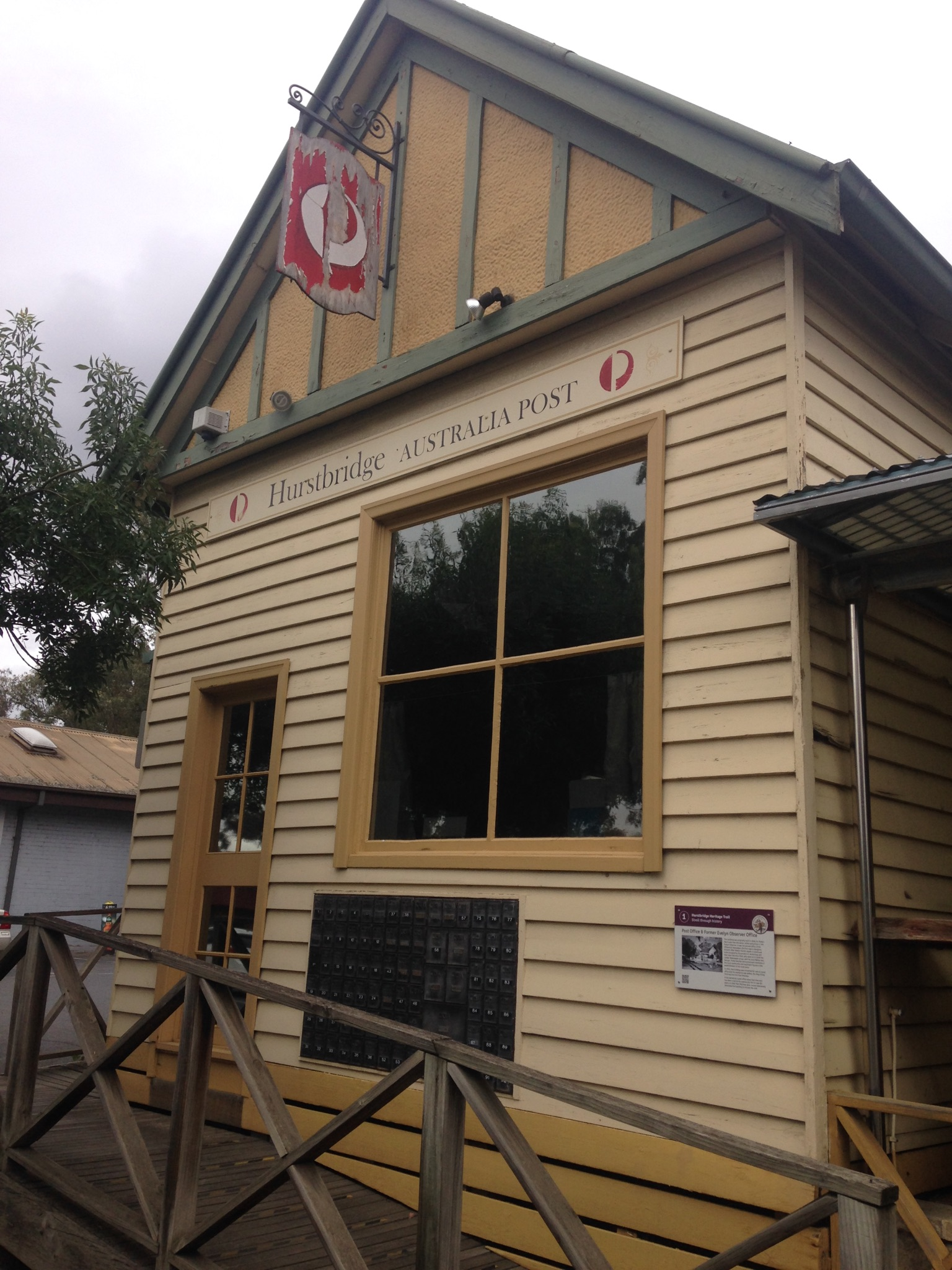
- Hurstbridge Post Office

- Interactive map of Hurstbridge
- Coordinates: 37°38′20″S 145°11′42″E
- Country: Australia
- State: Victoria
- LGA: Shire of Nillumbik
- Location: 28 km (17 mi) from Melbourne

Government
  - State electorate: Yan Yean
  - Federal division: McEwen

Area
  - Total: 14.8 km^{2} (5.7 sq mi)

Population
  - Total: 3,554 (2021 census)
  - Density: 240.1/km^{2} (621.9/sq mi)
- Postcode: 3099
Localities around Hurstbridge
Doreen	Nutfield	Cottles Bridge
Yarrambat	Hurstbridge	Panton Hill
Yarrambat	Diamond Creek	Wattle Glen

Hurstbridge is a town and suburb in Victoria, Australia, 28 km north-east of the Melbourne CBD, located within the Shire of Nillumbik local government area. Hurstbridge recorded a population of 3,554 at the 2021 census.

Hurstbridge lies between Wattle Glen to the south, Arthur's Creek to the north and Panton Hill to the east.

== History ==
Before colonisation, the land around Hurstbridge was occupied by the Wurundjeri-Willam clan, an Aboriginal Australian people of the Woiwurrung language group. The Wurundjeri-Willam clan were part of the larger Kulin alliance. Hurstbridge was first settled by colonists in 1842 by Cornelius Haley, a grazier. The area was originally known as Upper Diamond Creek, or Allwood, after the homestead built there on Haley's selection. The town was renamed in 1924. The town's current name is from the Hurst family. Henry Hurst worked for Haley, and in 1857 was joined by his father Robert, mother, and siblings. The Hursts took over from Haley and built the first log bridge across the Diamond Creek, upstream from the present Monash Bridge, in 1858. In 1866, Henry Hurst was fatally wounded by a bushranger, Robert Bourke. The latter was captured and tied to a wheel of a wagon under a tree (now known as Bourke's Tree) until troopers from nearby St Andrews (formerly Queenstown) arrived. Bourke was tried and found guilty of the murder and was later hanged.

For many years the area was characterised by orchards and nurseries, and in 1912 a railway line was extended to Hurstbridge to transport fruit to Melbourne. As a result of this rail connection, a settlement started developing near the bridge. A post office was opened in 1912 and the current single-lane bridge, designed by Sir John Monash, was completed in 1918. The township was originally known as Hurst's Bridge until 1915, and then as Hurst Bridge until about 1954. Further development of the town occurred in the Post-War years, and electricity was connected in 1957.

The artist Albert Tucker moved to a 5-acre (20,000 m^{2}) property in Hurstbridge in the 1960s, where he lived for many years. A series of paintings from the time depict the natural bushland around his property.

== Today ==
The area is home to a diverse mix of families, artists, musicians and people looking for a balance between city and country. The township services local residents and visitors from 60+ small businesses and artisan shops. A number of surrounding attractions include wineries, walking tracks, farmers' markets, and local artists' markets.

In 2022, the Diamond Creek Trail extension to Hurstbridge was completed. The extension makes a continuous trail from Hurstbridge to the CBD via the Yarra River Trail.

Hurstbridge's most iconic event is the annual Hurstbridge Wattle Festival. The festival is held on the last Sunday in August and is a significant cultural event that has its roots firmly planted in the early railway history of the area. Festival goers are able to view the wattles in a blaze of glory along the Diamond Creek as they approach the area. The whole of Hurstbridge takes part in the Festival, which sees various precincts set up throughout the suburb providing an extensive array of family entertainment, events, and activities.

Hurstbridge Station is served by regular trains to and from the Melbourne Central Business District.

On New Year's Day 2003 the local primary school was destroyed by fire when an air-conditioning unit malfunctioned. It was replaced in 2005 by a newly built school.

The late champion motor racing driver Peter Brock, who died in 2006, was raised in Hurstbridge, where he continued to live throughout his life.

== Facilities ==
Hurstbridge Primary School, first established in 1916 and occupying its current Main Road site since 1982 (now in buildings opened in 2005), provides education for children between the ages of 4–5 (Prep Year) and 12–13 (Year 6), following the curriculum set by the Victorian Curriculum and Assessment Authority.

Hurstbridge Post Office, at 794 Heidelberg-Kinglake Road, opposite the Hurstbridge railway station, occupies a building that was originally constructed in 1918 to serve as headquarters of the former Evelyn Observer local newspaper.

Hurstbridge Hall, at 974 Heidelberg-Kinglake Road, with a seating capacity of 120 and disabled access, provides facilities for public and private functions, dances, exercise classes, small productions, markets, and meetings.

The Hurstbridge Community Hub, at 50 Graysharps Road, provides community room hire and integrated community services, including early years daycare and preschool programmes and maternal and child healthcare services, as well as other services offered by local groups. In September 2020 a library hub was established in the foyer in partnership with Yarra Plenty Regional Library. The Hurstbridge Basketball Stadium is also situated on the same site.

== Sports ==
- Hurstbridge has a football team, which plays in the Northern Football League and is based at Ben Frilay Oval at 36 Graysharps Road. The Hurstbridge Netball Club is part of the Football Club.
- The suburb also has a cricket club, playing in the Diamond Valley Cricket Association and a basketball team, the Hurstbridge Hurricanes, who play in the Diamond Valley Basketball Association.

== Demographics ==
At the 2021 Australian census, Hurstbridge recorded a population of 3,554 residents living in 1,307 dwellings. A high percentage of residents were born in Australia (86.1%) compared to the state (65%), and fewer had both parents born overseas (16.2%) compared to the state (41.3%). 59.4% had no religious affiliation, 14.4% were Catholic, 7.9% were Anglican, and 2.9% were part of the Uniting Church. 96.9% of Hurstbridge residents lived in a detached house, with only 2.5% living in a semi-detached house or other dwelling.

== See also ==
- City of Whittlesea – Parts of Hurstbridge were previously within this local government area.
- Shire of Diamond Valley – Parts of Hurstbridge were previously within this former local government area.
- Shire of Eltham – Parts of Hurstbridge were previously within this former local government area.
