= Nutfield, Victoria =

Nutfield
- Town
- Interactive map of Nutfield
- Coordinates: 37.603°S 145.181°E
- Country: Australia
- State: Victoria
- LGA: Shire of Nillumbik
- Location: 30 km (19 mi) from Melbourne; 5 km (3.1 mi) from Hurstbridge

Government
  - State electorate: Yan Yean
  - Federal division: McEwen
- Elevation: 160 m (520 ft)

Population
  - Total: 158 (2021 census)
- Postcode: 3099

Nutfield is a locality in Victoria, Australia, 30 km north-east of Melbourne's Central Business District, located within the Shire of Nillumbik local government area. Nutfield recorded a population of 158 at the 2021 census.

== History ==
Nutfield Post Office opened around October 1911 and closed in 1964.

== See also ==
- City of Whittlesea – Parts of Nutfield were previously within this local government area.
- Shire of Eltham – Parts of Nutfield were previously within this former local government area.
