= Shaun Wilson-Miller =

Australian writer (1995–2012)

- Born: 23 January 1995
- Died: 26 May 2012 (aged 17)

Shaun Wilson-Miller was an Australian born with a congenital heart defect and who died on 26 May 2012 at the age of 17 years. Miller was born on 23 January 1995. Before Miller died, he lived with his father in the Melbourne suburb of Mill Park and went to school at Lalor North Secondary College up until Year 10.

Miller was an Essendon Bombers football fan and met his idol, Jobe Watson, on Channel 9's The Footy Show. Since the age of 13, Miller enjoyed being a HeartKids Victoria ambassador and a motivational speaker to many children.

Miller's funeral was held at Plenty Ranges Arts and Community Centre. Nearly 1,000 people attended and there were many tributes from around the world. Miller also posted his final goodbye on YouTube on 1 May 2012. Soon after uploading his "Final Goodbye", it had begun to receive large amounts of attention and grief from other viewers on the platform YouTube. As of 2023, the video has 7.8M+ views.

== Book ==
Author Shaun Miller published, An Awesome Ride, on 2 December 2012. Miller's dying wish was to publish his book which promotes being positive and never giving up on life. The book reveals how he met his first girlfriend, suffered domestic abuse and continued to be brave through his serious heart condition. Cameron Miller is promoting Miller's strong message nationally through book signings, radio and TV interviews and school guest appearances.

An Awesome Ride launched on Sunday 2 December at Kingston Arts and Cultural Centre with guest performances from Rachael Leahcar, Fatai Veveamatahau and Paula Parore. The evening was hosted by comedian Bev Killick and more than 100 people attended the concert that followed the book launch.

In May 2013, An Awesome Ride, won an Independent Publishers Book Award for Best Regional Non-Fiction (Australia/New Zealand .

In 2019 Penguin Random House published the autobiography of Miller's father, Cameron, with content from the original book. The book is titled An Awesome Ride Through a Father's Eyes and was co-authored with Andrew Clarke.

== Movie ==
Miller's father, Cameron Miller, is currently in negotiations with movie studios about the production of the movie An Awesome Ride.
