= Plenty, Victoria =

Plenty
- Suburb
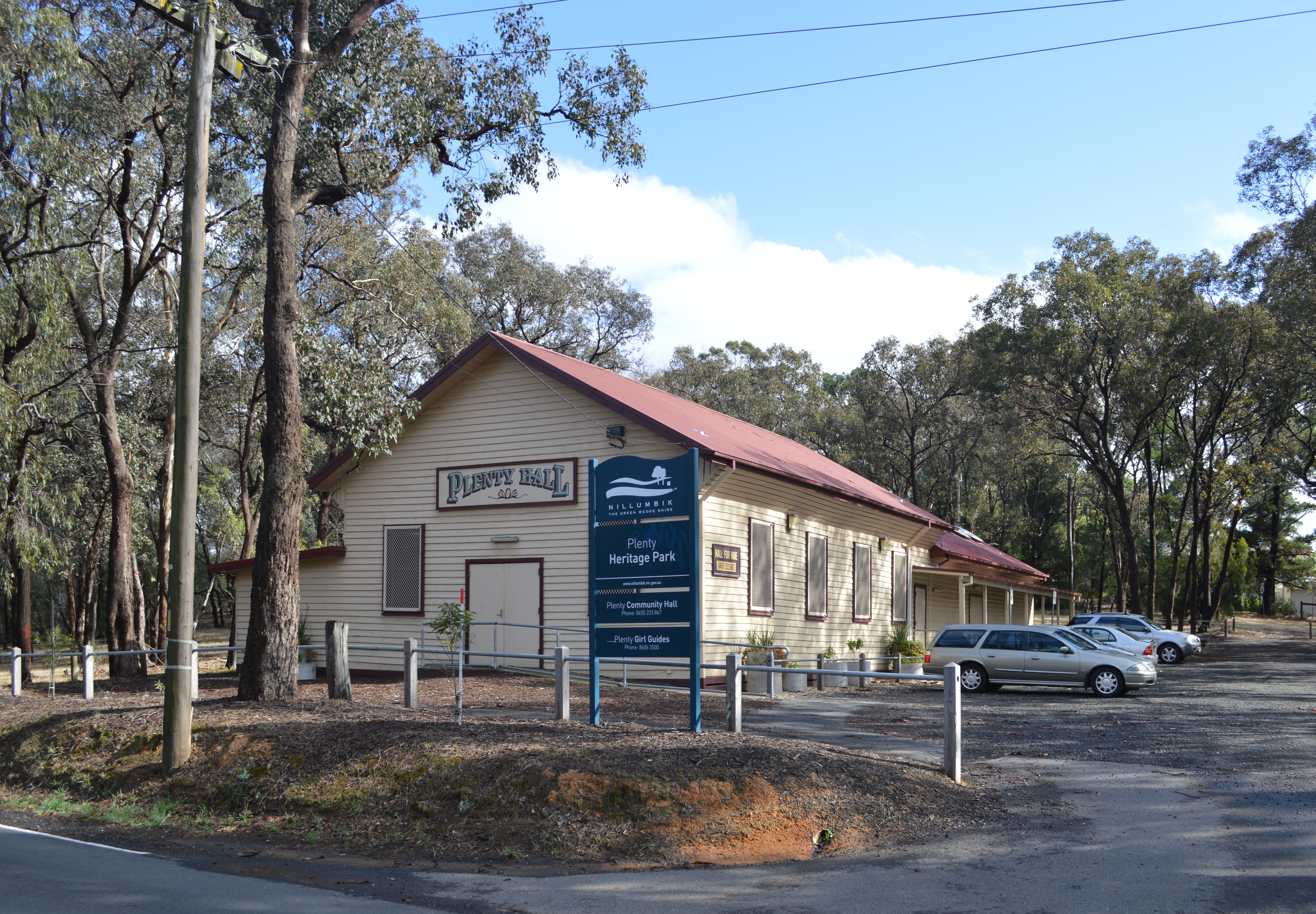
- Plenty Hall

- Interactive map of Plenty
- Coordinates: 37.669°S 145.117°E
- Country: Australia
- State: Victoria
- City: Melbourne
- LGA: Shire of Nillumbik
- Location: 21 km (13 mi) from Melbourne

Government
  - State electorate: Yan Yean
  - Federal division: Jagajaga

Area
  - Total: 1 km^{2} (0.39 sq mi)

Population
  - Total: 2,575 (2021 census)
  - Density: 2,600/km^{2} (7,000/sq mi)
- Postcode: 3090
Suburbs around Plenty
| South Morang | Yarrambat | Hurstbridge |
| Mill Park | Plenty | Diamond Creek |
| Bundoora | Greensborough | Diamond Creek |

Plenty is a suburb in Melbourne, Victoria, Australia, 21 km (13 mi) north-east of Melbourne's Central Business District, located within the Shire of Nillumbik local government area. Plenty recorded a population of 2,575 at the 2021 census.

Plenty is located within Greater Melbourne, beyond the Melbourne metropolitan area Urban Growth Boundary. It is a semi-rural area consisting mostly of large lots, with many being several acres in size. However, increasing urbanisation is evident near the border with the suburb of Greensborough. New housing estates are being established with the population in the area set to increase, however large areas of Plenty are still relatively untouched with development limited due to being in the green wedge.

== History ==
Plenty Post Office opened on 3 August 1923 and closed in 1979. An earlier office opened in 1853 and was replaced by Whittlesea in 1864.

Plenty Primary School on Howell Road was closed in the 1990s under the Kennett Government.

Plenty Cricket Club was formed in 1946 and continues to play today.

The Plenty Historical Society was formed in 2001.

== Main features and attractions ==
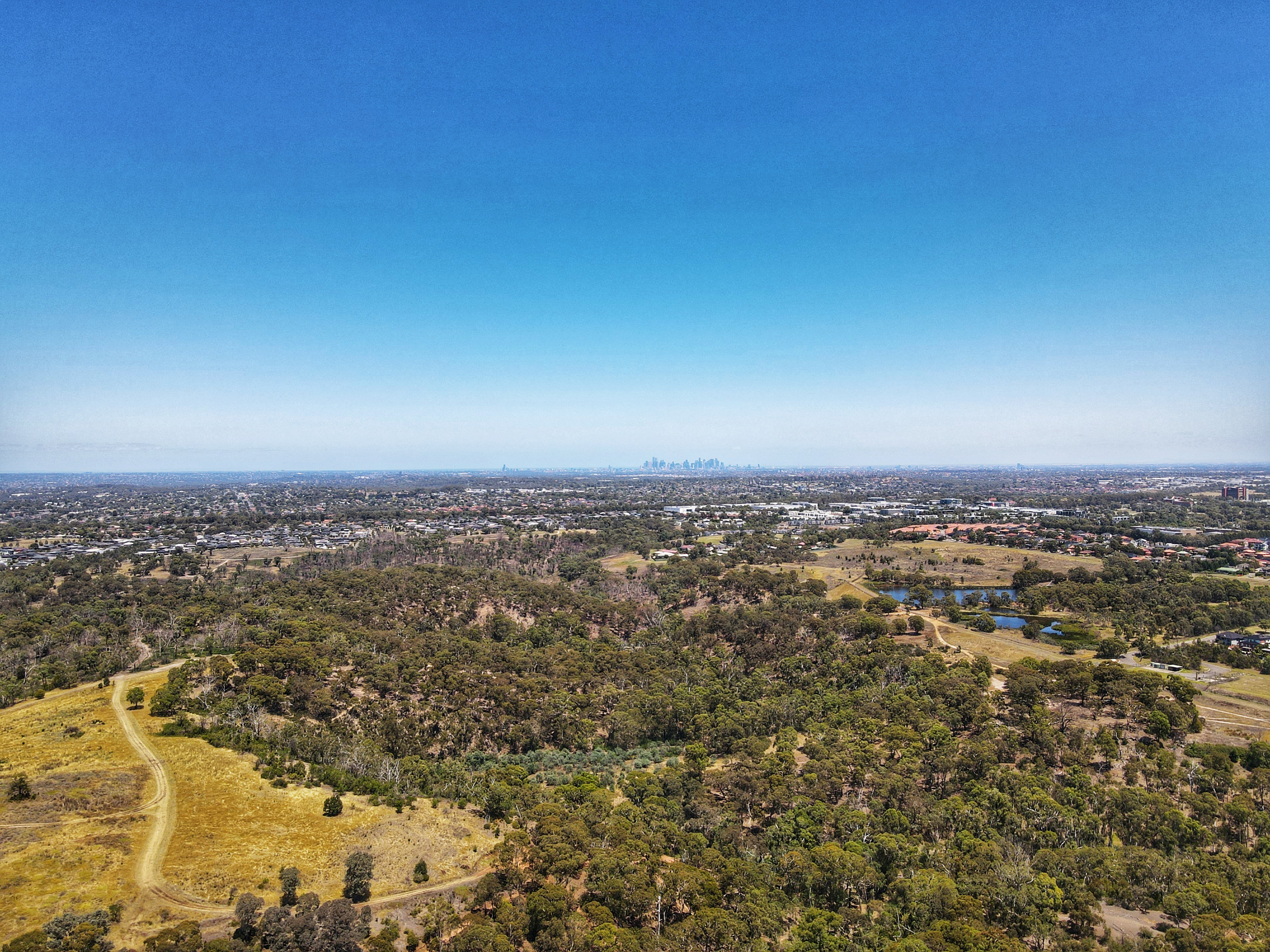
Yellow Gum Park at Plenty Gorge in January 2021

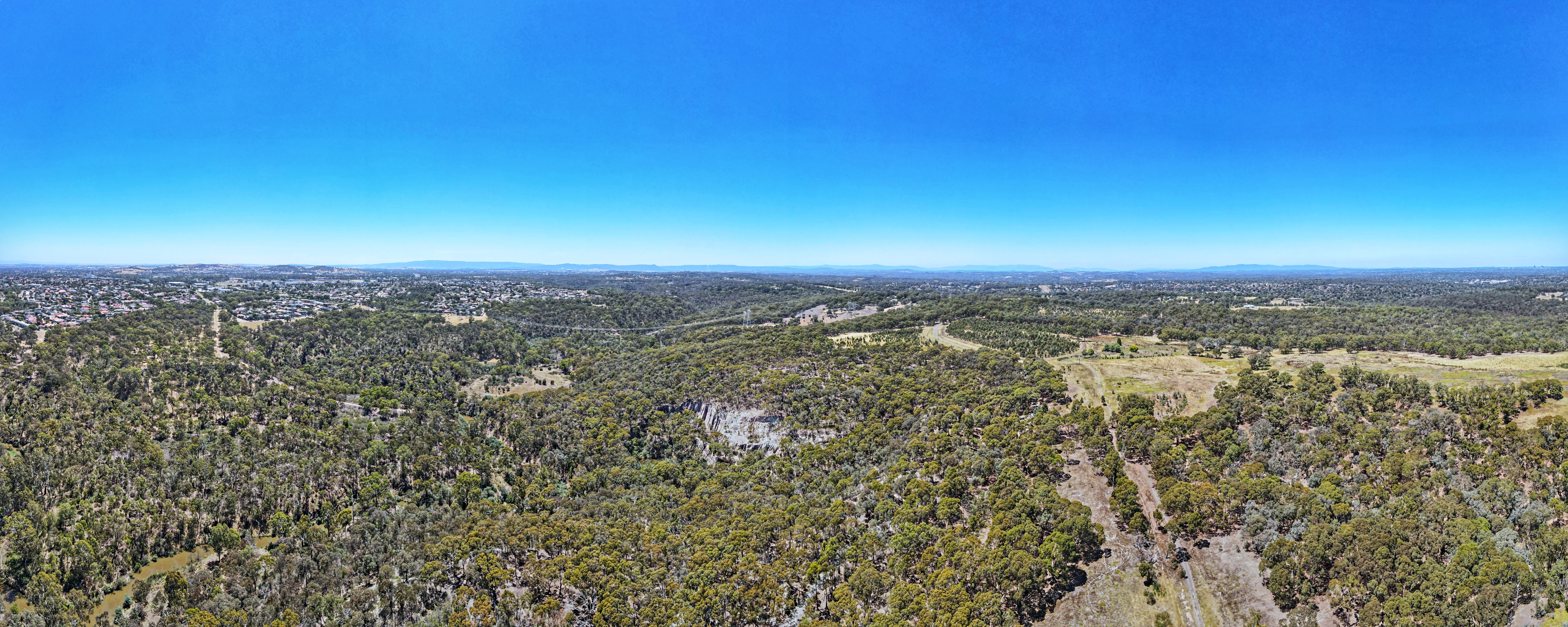
View of the Great Dividing Range from Plenty Gorge in January 2021

The Plenty River makes up the border between Mill Park and Plenty. "Blue Lake" is located in Yellow Gum Recreation Area named for the beautiful colours of the water owing to the mineral contents. Yellow Gum Recreation Area is located in the Plenty Gorge Parklands and offers many natural and cultural experiences. A bushfire in Plenty Gorge Park occurred on 30 December 2019 and burnt approximately 65 hectares, the affected areas have now reopened. The area know known as Plenty Gorge Park has been seasonally visited by the Wurundjeri people for tens of thousands of years.

Diamond Valley Library, Greensborough is the nearest public library operated by Yarra Plenty Regional Library.

== Transport ==
The main arterial running through Plenty is Yan Yean Road. Increased pressure is being placed on this road as it is used primarily by commuters travelling between the City and new estates in Doreen and surrounds, including Laurimar. Severe congestion is experienced during peak hours and it is often difficult to enter Plenty from Memorial Drive and River Avenue heading towards the City (traditional access routes). Throughout 2018 and 2019, Yan Yean Road was upgraded from a single-lane rural road into a two-lane divided Arterial Road, with traffic lights installed at Memorial Drive, River Avenue, and Browns Lane. This has greatly improved access for local residents of Plenty and improved congestion on Yan Yean Road.

Three metropolitan bus routes run along Yan Yean Rd. Since October 2010, SmartBus route 901 links Plenty with Melbourne Airport (T4), Broadmeadows, Epping, South Morang (Plenty Valley), Greensborough, Ringwood, and Frankston. It runs via Yan Yean Road, stopping at the Plenty Store/Plenty Fire Station every 15 minutes, much increasing the public transport connections in this area.

The nearest train stations are Diamond Creek or Greensborough, on the Hurstbridge line, and South Morang, on the Mernda line.

== Sport ==
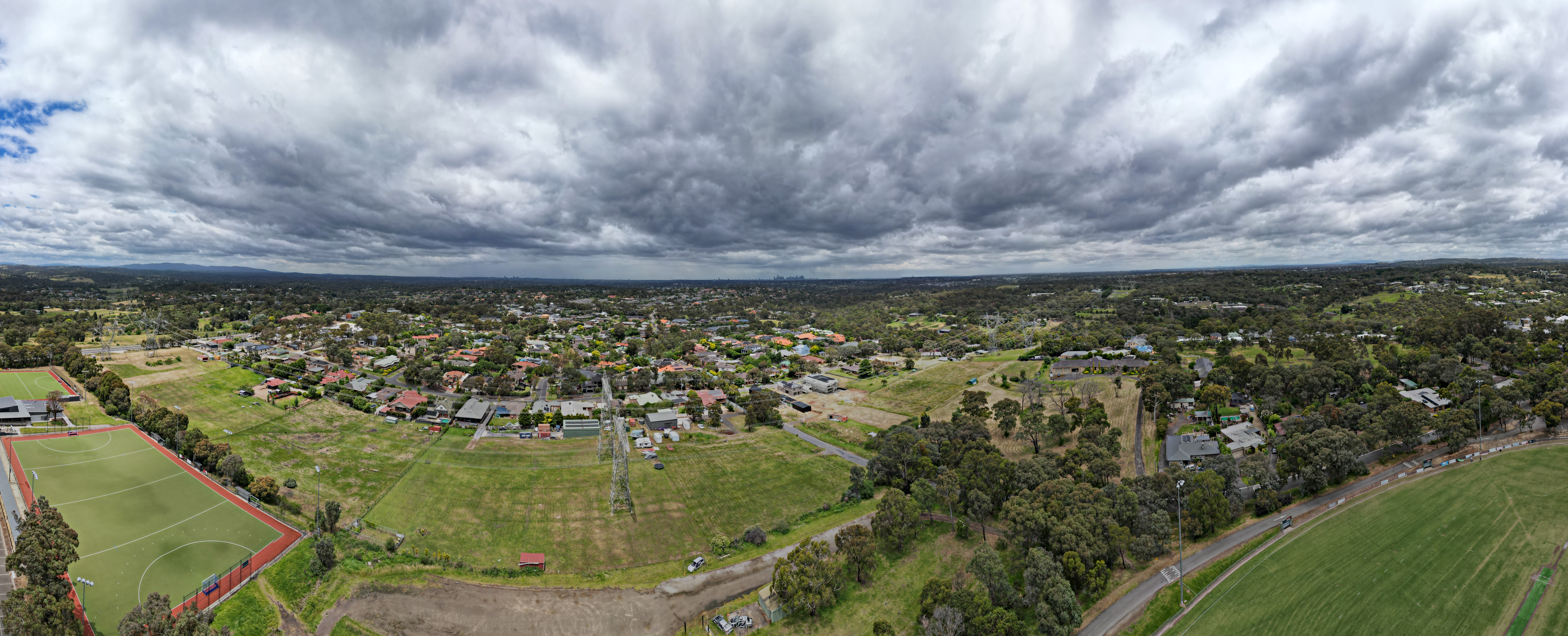
Plenty from above. Facing Melbourne CBD. December 2022

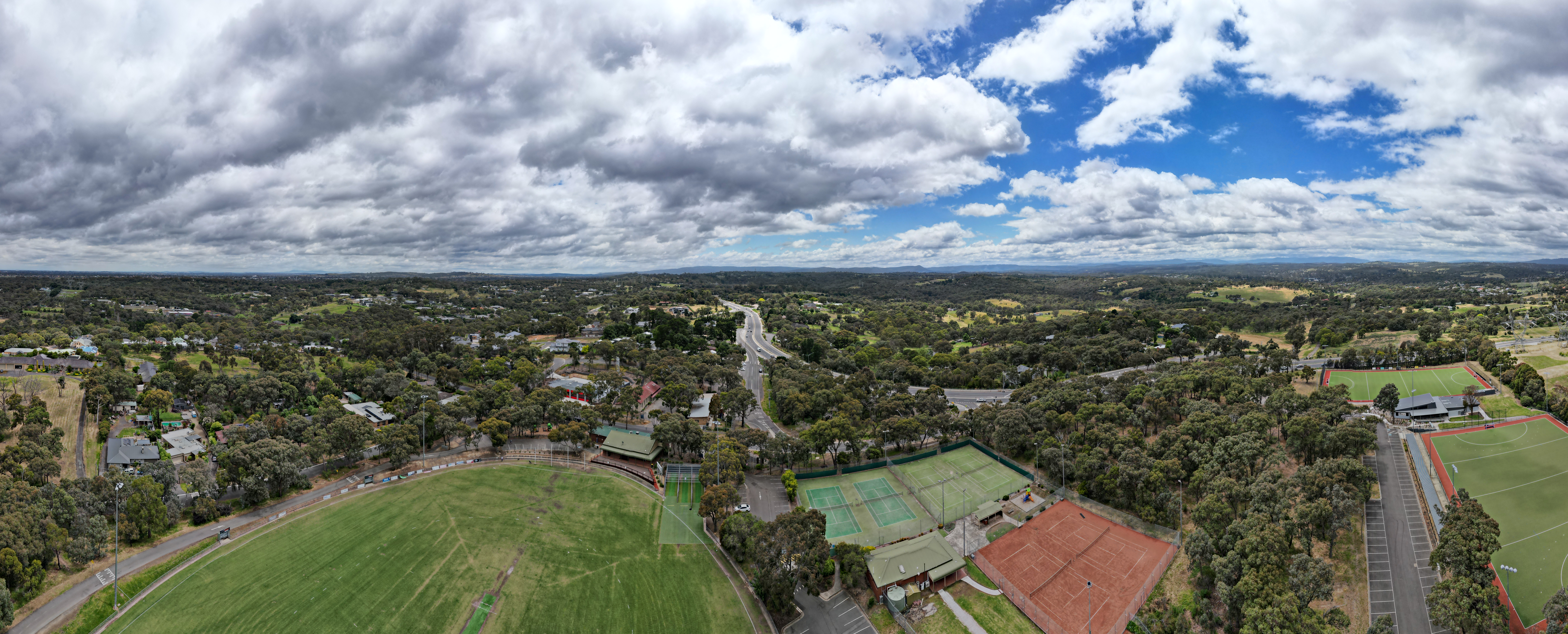
Aerial perspective of Plenty War Memorial Park. December 2022.

Plenty War Memorial Park is home to the Diamond Creek Women's Football Club at 21 Memorial Drive. DCWFC is a female-only Australia Rules club, with players ranging from 7 to 70 years old.

It is also home to Greensborough Hockey Club. The Plenty Cricket Club play in the Diamond Valley Cricket Association. Plenty Tennis Club play their home games at the Tennis courts at Plenty Park. Plenty Knights Basketball Club, who play in the Diamond Valley Basketball Association domestic competition, are based in Plenty.

== See also ==
- Shire of Diamond Valley – Plenty was previously within this former local government area.
