= Aurora, Victoria =

Housing estate in Melbourne, Australia

Coordinates: 37°37′12″S 145°00′47″E

Aurora is a housing estate in Melbourne, Victoria, Australia designed to provide homes with higher levels of energy and water efficiency. The plan is to build it over 15 years and to have 8500 residences.

== Location ==
Aurora is now located partly within the suburb of Epping (an outer northern suburb of Melbourne) and partly within the rural locality of Wollert. Aurora is in the City of Whittlesea council area. It is about 20 km from the Melbourne CBD and is approximately 668 ha in area. It is bound by the Hume Freeway (to Sydney), Epping Road, Craigieburn Road and O'Herns Road on the west, east, north and south sides respectively. It is north of the ring road and west of Plenty Road.

== Sustainability ==
Homes in Aurora will be expected to have an energy efficiency rating of at least 6 stars, achieved by using efficient appliances, solar-heating of water where possible, insulation of buildings and houses designed with good ventilation and orientation of windows. Streets are designed for optimal capturing of solar power. Aurora's water efficiency measures aim to have 54% less potable water consumed per person than normal houses, and are expected to discharge 90% less water into the sea. Water efficient appliances will be used to minimise consumption.

Rain gardens are used to trap stormwater ensuring that water is retained inland and water & pollutants are not washed into the sea. Stormwater captured from houses is drained into water tanks before being heated to supply domestic hot water. Wastewater/Sewage is drained to the suburb's wastewater treatment plant, where it is recycled for (non-potable) reuse, with 300 megalitres stored to meet the demand for non-potable water while the remainder can be sold.

== Transport ==
The suburb is designed to encourage walking and use of public transport. 20% of Aurora's land is parkland or reserves.

The Mernda railway line originally continued to Whittlesea but the line beyond Mernda has not been in use since the diesel service was discontinued. As part of the Aurora development it was anticipated that the government would extend an electrified railway line north-west to Aurora. Such a development would have provided an energy efficient public transport service to the city for residents of Aurora.

The proposal was costed between $76 million and $300 million, and would branch off the South Morang line at Lalor, with new stations at Epping Plaza, Aurora and Epping North. The extension of the suburban network to Aurora has been highlighted as a public transport priority. This proposal, however, is on hold indefinitely.
