= The letter (McCubbin) =

Painting by Frederick McCubbin

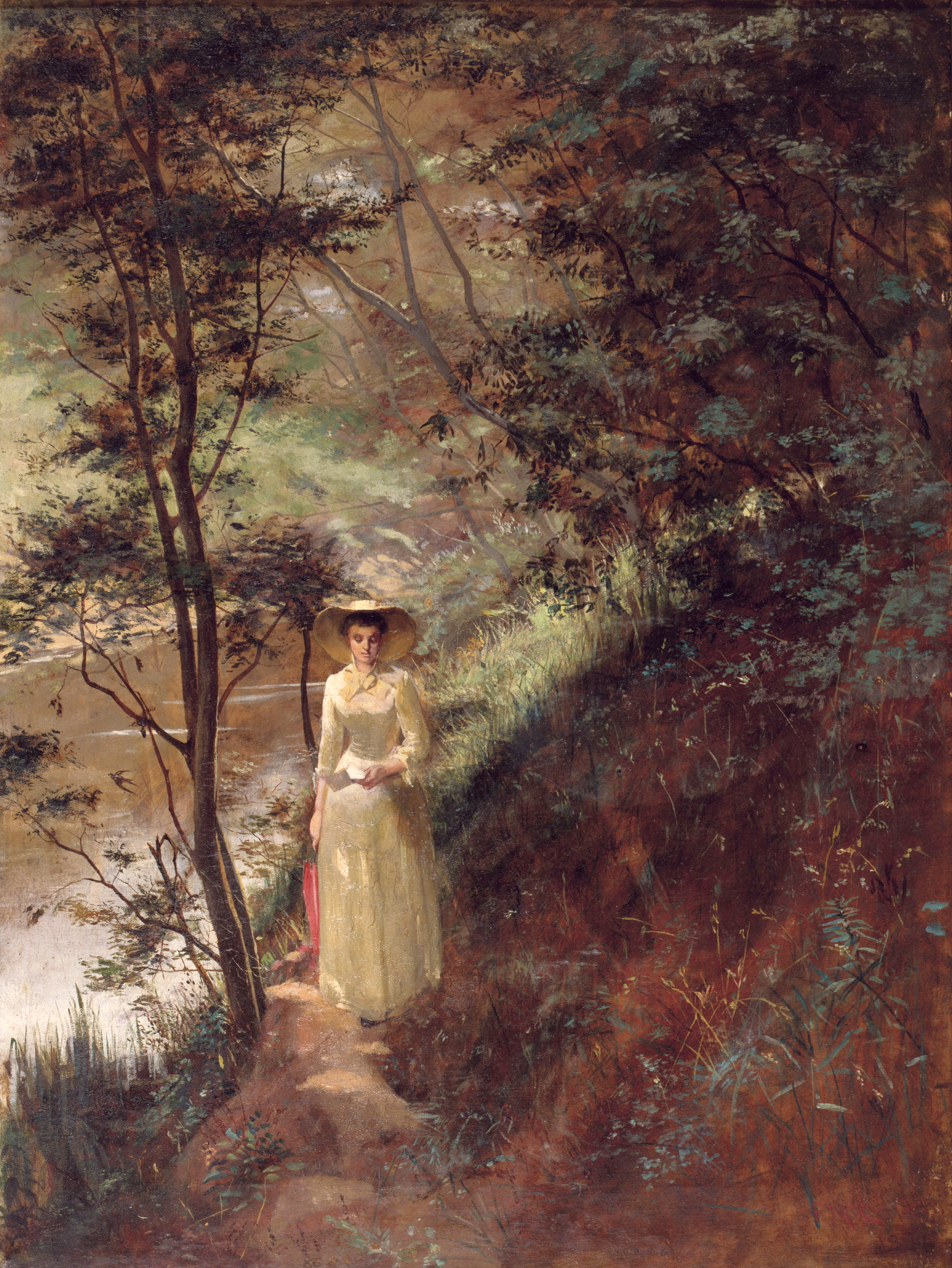
- Artist: Frederick McCubbin
- Year: 1884
- Medium: oil on canvas
- Dimensions: 69.1 cm × 51.0 cm (27.2 in × 20.1 in)
- Location: Art Gallery of Ballarat; Ballarat
- Website: artgalleryofballarat.com.au

The letter is an 1884 painting by the Australian artist Frederick McCubbin. The painting depicts a young woman reading a letter walking in the bush alongside a stream.

The model for the woman was the artist's sister Harriet McCubbin (known as "Polly"), an art student. The setting is believed to have been worked up from en plein air sketches of the Yarra River near Darebin Creek.

A privately held sister piece, featuring the woman reading the letter without the bush setting will be auctioned in November 2021.

The painting was acquired by the Art Gallery of Ballarat in 1946 and remains part of its collection.
