= Syd Billings =

Australian rules footballer

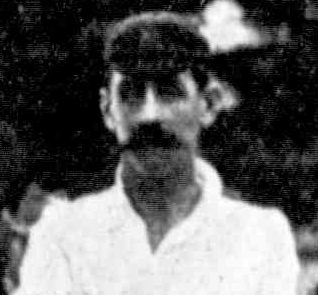

Personal information
- Full name: Sydney Charles Billings
- Born: 1 January 1879; Fitzroy, Victoria
- Died: 5 June 1915 (aged 36); South Morang, Victoria
- Original team: Rose of Northcote

Playing career^{1}
Years	Club	Games (Goals)
1905–1907	Fitzroy	32 (2)
- ^{1} Playing statistics correct to the end of 1907.

Sydney Charles Billings (1 January 1879 – 5 June 1915) was an Australian rules footballer who played with Fitzroy in the Victorian Football League (VFL).

== Career ==
Billings, a defender recruited from Rose of Northcote, was already 26 when he debuted for Fitzroy in the 1905 VFL season. Fitzroy were the reigning VFL premiers, but Billings broke into the side in the opening round and played 13 games in the home and away season. He didn't take part in the 1905 finals series, which ended with Fitzroy claiming another premiership. In the 1906 season, Billings played only the first seven rounds, but in the 1907 season he was a regular in the team, with 12 appearances. Often used as a full-back, Billings was said to be noted for his "brilliant high marking"

In 1908 he got a permit to return to Rose of Northcote. By this time he was also playing district cricket for the Northcote Cricket Club and in 1911–12 was a member of the club's first-grade premiership side. As a footballer he went on to play for Northcote in the Victorian Football Association (VFA), later Northcote-Preston as a result of a merger. He was cleared to the Williamstown Football Club in 1912. He played only three games for 'Town without kicking a goal in his only season for the Royal Blue and Golds.

== Personal life and death ==
Billings died in a car accident at Morang on the night of 5 June 1915, aged 36. He was a passenger in the car, which had to swerve into an embankment to avoid colliding with a wood dray. The back tyre burst and the occupants were tossed out of the vehicle. Billings appeared relatively unharmed, as he was able to go over and assist his companions in moving the car, but after giving it a lift lost consciousness. It was likely that he had suffered heart failure.

He was married to Luisa Billings, with whom he had two children, Charlie and Bessie. A concert was held at Northcote Town Hall to raise money for his family.
