= Mill Park, Victoria =

Mill Park
- Suburb
- View of Epping and Mill Park from Quarry Hills Park.

- Interactive map of Mill Park
- Coordinates: 37.671°S 145.062°E
- Country: Australia
- State: Victoria
- City: Melbourne
- LGA: City of Whittlesea
- Location: 18 km (11 mi) from Melbourne

Government
  - State electorates: Bundoora; Mill Park
  - Federal division: Scullin

Area
  - Total: 13.1 km^{2} (5.1 sq mi)

Population
  - Total: 28,712 (2021 census)
  - Density: 2,192/km^{2} (5,677/sq mi)
- Postcode: 3082
Suburbs around Mill Park
Epping	Epping	South Morang
Lalor	Mill Park	Plenty
Thomastown	Bundoora	Bundoora

Mill Park is a suburb of Melbourne, Victoria, Australia, 18 km north-east of Melbourne's central business district, located within the City of Whittlesea local government area. Mill Park recorded a population of 28,712 at the 2021 census.

Mill Park's boundaries are South Morang and Epping to the north, Plenty and the Blossom Park and Rivergum estates to the east, Bundoora and Thomastown to the south and Lalor to the west.

== History and development ==
The area is named after the flour mill built by George and Francis Coulstock on the Plenty River in the 1840s. The property was sold to Henry "Money" Miller (1809-1888). He bred racehorses and conducted a range of dairy and grazing activities, sufficient to occupy 65 persons housed in a village on the property. The Findon Hounds and the Findon Harriers Hunt Club—a name connected with Miller's residence—Findon in Kew, were at Mill Park.

The Mill Park property specialised in horse breeding into the next century and the Findon Harriers continued there until 1930. Mill Park's rural landscape was largely unaltered until the 1960s, apart from the opening of a quarry in 1964. Prior to 1957, the land today known as Yellow Gum Park where the quarry is located was part of the historic "Clear Hill" property, which stretched from the Plenty River east to Oatland Road. These lands were predominantly used for dairy farming along with grazing and minor cropping.

As a result of severe bushfires during 1957, the Clear Hill estate was subdivided into smaller allotments. The portion now known as Yellow Gum Park was purchased by Reid Quarries Pty Ltd who quarried the area to produce materials that were used in the construction of many of Melbourne's early 'Sky Scrapers'. Quarrying operations commenced during 1959 and Boral Australia took over the site in the 1960s. The plant was closed in the early 1970s because of ground water seeping into the quarry hole. The ground water seepage has produced the lake which many locals know as "Blue Lake".

Following on from residential development in Bundoora, subdivisions occurred in the 1970s and a kindergarten, pre-school centre and shopping complex were built by the end of the decade. The shopping centre has several historic place names: The "Stables Shopping Centre" and Redleap Avenue commemorate the solidly built Redleap racing stables on the Miller property and the Plough Hotel commemorates the Plough Inn which formed a nucleus village in the Mill Park area during the 1850s.

The street "Mill Park Drive" is a large oval ring, which was once a horse racing track. Many of the streets pay homage to past race horses, such as Phar Lap, Carbine, Eaglet, Whernside, Studley and Redleap.

During the 1980s Mill Park underwent rapid residential development, with State and church primary schools (Mill Park Primary School, Saint Francis Primary School). Mill Park Post Office opened on 1 August 1983.

There are several neighbourhood reserves, and three large ones in the west of Mill Park. A freeway reservation runs north–south, parallel to Mill Park's western boundary along Darebin Creek. The east of Mill Park extends to pollution-control wetlands which border the Plenty River. The area is serviced by two main shared paths; the Hendersons Road Drain Trail and the Darebin Creek Trail. The extreme north boundary is the Mernda railway line.

== Education ==
The continued rapid residential expansion spawned a state secondary college (Mill Park Secondary College) and recreational facilities and the RMIT Bundoora East Campus is inside Mill Park's border.

The Mill Park Secondary College opened in 1992, starting out with year 7 students only, with year 7 enrolments doubling in 1993. By 1994 there were 1000 students attending the college, and it was clear that the Campus would not physically support many more students. A Senior Campus was built on Civic Drive in Epping, and was operational in time for the original year 7 students of 1992 to attend year 11 in 1996. The Senior Campus originally taught year 11 and 12 students only (VCE); however, since Term 3, 2005, Year 10 students attend the Senior Campus.

Mill Park boasts both private and state Primary Schools in the form of St Francis Primary School, Mill Park Heights, Plenty Parklands, Findon and Mill Park Primary Schools.

== Demographics ==
The most common ancestries in Mill Park were Australian 16.0%, English 14.4%, Italian 12.5%, Macedonian 5.8% and Indian 5.4%.

== Modern Mill Park ==
Modern Mill Park consists of both the traditional Mill Park land and the expanding neighbourhood of Mill Park Lakes, located to the Northeast.

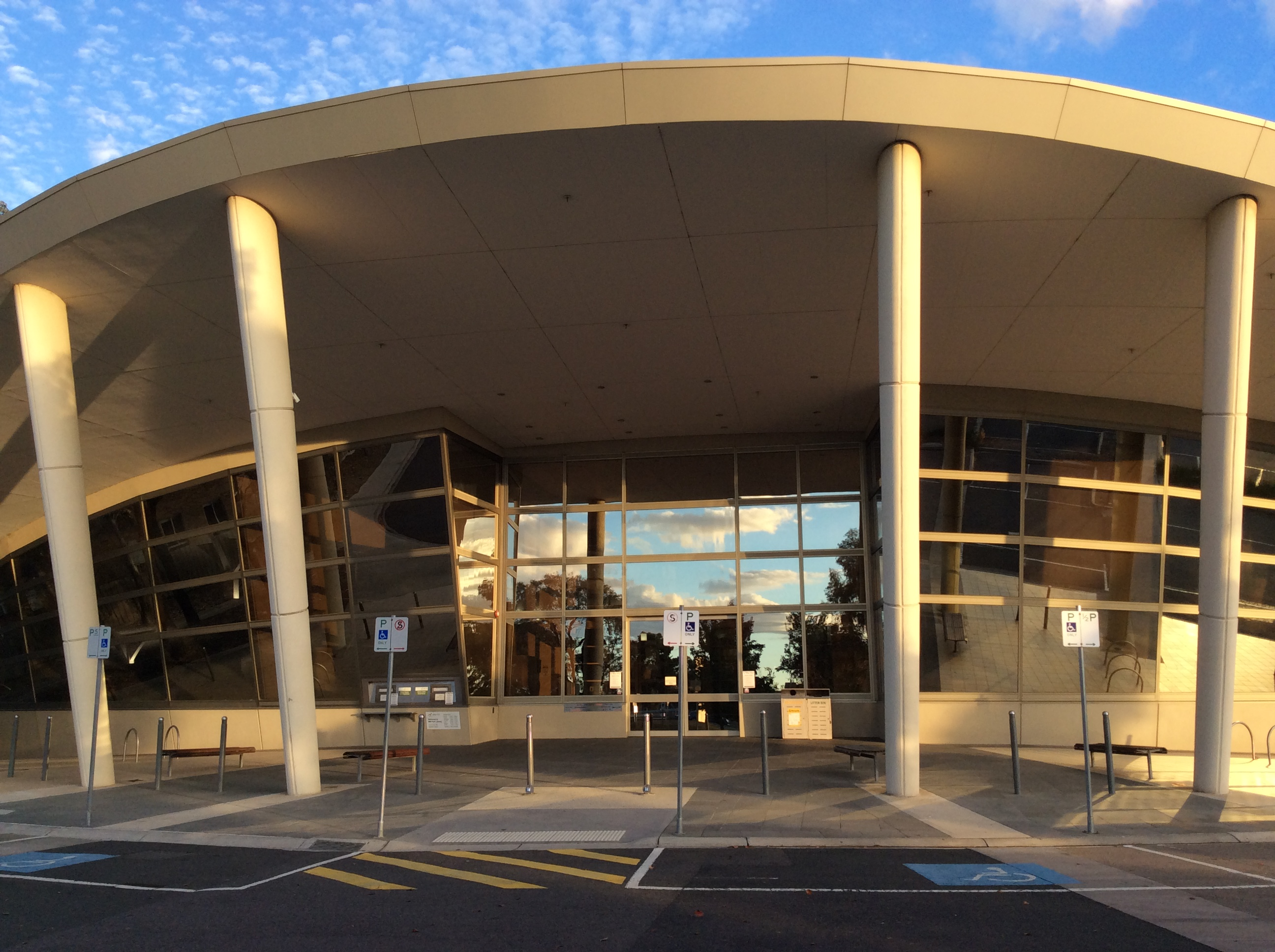
Mill Park Library

Shopping in Mill Park consists of The Stables Shopping Centre, located on Childs Road, and the Plenty Valley Shopping Centre, located on McDonald's Road.

Mill Park Plaza, located on the corner of Plenty Road & Development Boulevard, is a shopping strip containing retail and consumer outlets including TAB, Restaurants, Take-away Food, Medical Centre, Allied Health services, Swim Centre, Real Estate agency and Children's Childcare centre.

The Mill Park Library, constructed in 2002, is a large, modern and spacious building designed by Oaten Stanistreet Architects and well-used by the residents of Mill Park and other suburbs. It is managed by Yarra Plenty Regional Library.

Mill Park is home to community radio station Plenty Valley FM (3PVR, 88.6 MHz), at 284 Childs Road. The station is officially designated as emergency broadcaster for its broadcast area, which includes the shires of Nillumbik and Whittlesea.

The Mill Park Leisure Centre underwent a major $25 million renovation and re-opened in 2021.

== Sport ==
Mill Park Football Club, an Australian rules football team, competes in the Northern Football League and is based at Redleap Reserve behind the Stables Shopping Centre.

Mill Park Soccer Club, an Association football, team are based at Partridge Street Reserve. The senior men's team competes in the Victorian State League 2 North-West. The club's biggest win came in a 8–0 win against Old Ivanhoe Grammarians.

Mill Park serves as the northern suburbs home of softball. Northern District Softball Association is based in Mill Park Reserve on Morang Drive and is the only softball association in the area, the next closest being Fawkner Park based Melbourne Softball Association. N.D.S.A offers softball to all ages and abilities and has sent several players to State and National teams. Any Saturday in summer can see the park alive with children and adults alike.

== See also ==
- Electoral district of Mill Park
