= The Northern Hospital, Epping =

Coordinates: 37°39′12″S 145°0′51″E

The Northern Hospital
- Northern Health
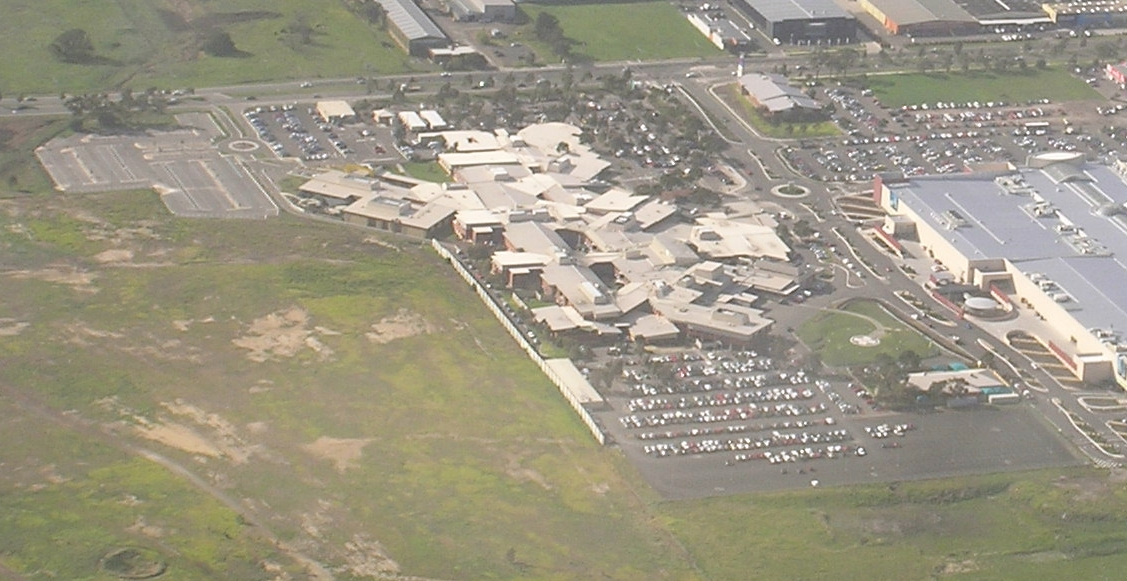
- The Northern Hospital from the south

Geography
- Location: Epping, Victoria, Australia

Organisation
- Affiliated university: The University of Melbourne; Deakin University; La Trobe University

Services
- Beds: 400

History
- Founded: 1998

Links
- Website: www.nh.org.au

The Northern Hospital (TNH) in Epping, Melbourne, Australia, is a major community hospital. It lies in the north of Melbourne, next to Pacific Epping.

It is a 400-bed hospital serving the northern suburbs of Melbourne, as well as the surrounding country areas of Victoria. The Northern Health catchment includes three of the state's six growth areas: Hume, Whittlesea and Mitchell, and the northern growth corridor population is projected to grow by 58 per cent between 2016 and 2031. It has the busiest emergency department in the state, treating approximately 100,000 patients each year.

The nursing wards are called units with the following names: Children Unit, Coronary Care, Intensive Care, Maternity and Women's Health, Medical, Surgical, Psychiatry, Short Stay Unit, Cardiovascular Laboratory, and Special Care Nursery.

The Northern Hospital is one of the clinical schools of the Melbourne Medical School.

On 1 November 2023, Kilmore District Health was merged with the Northern Hospital.
