= Darebin Creek =

Coordinates: 37°47′03″S 145°02′24″E

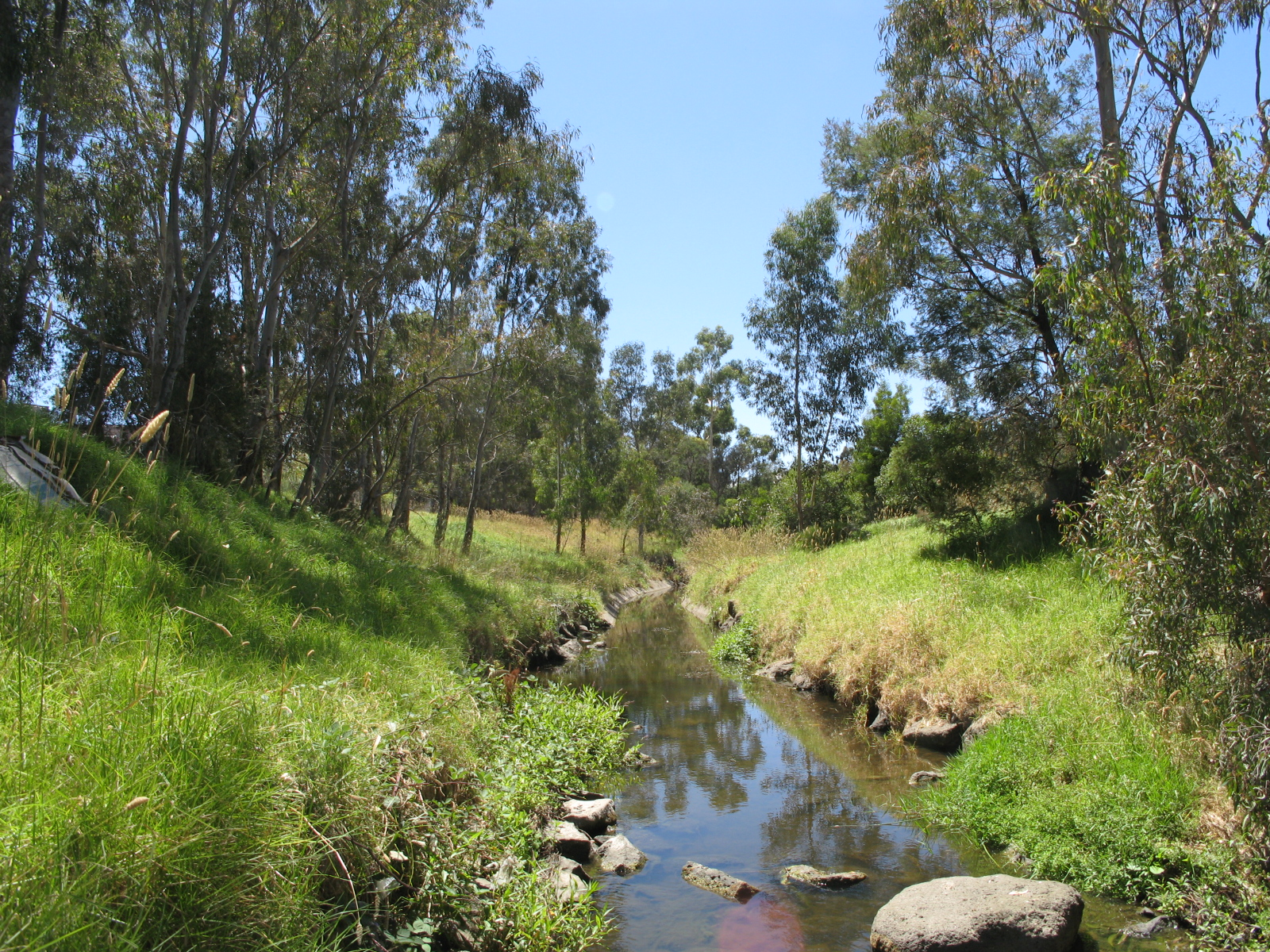
- Darebin Creek, through Heidelberg West

Location
- Country: Australia
- State: Victoria

Physical characteristics
- Length: ~30 km (19 mi)
- Basin size: Unknown

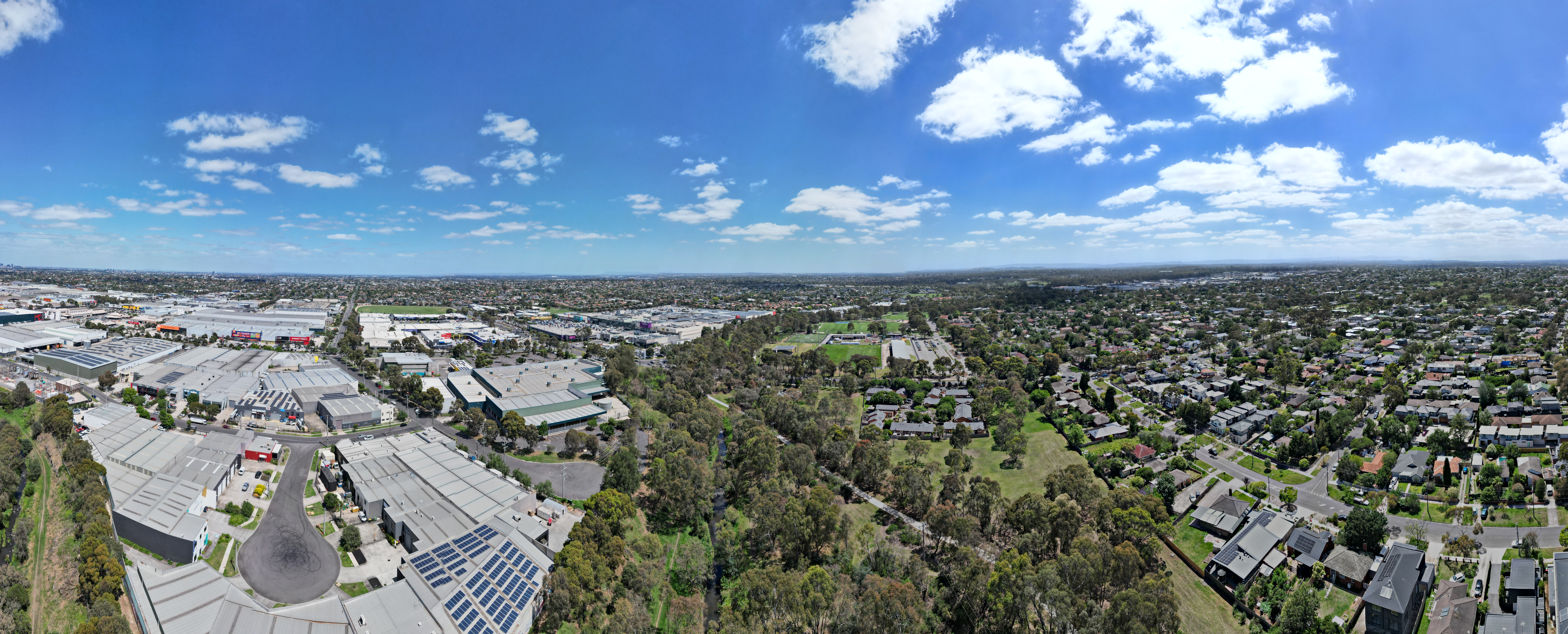
Darebin Creek, alongside Northland and its surrounds

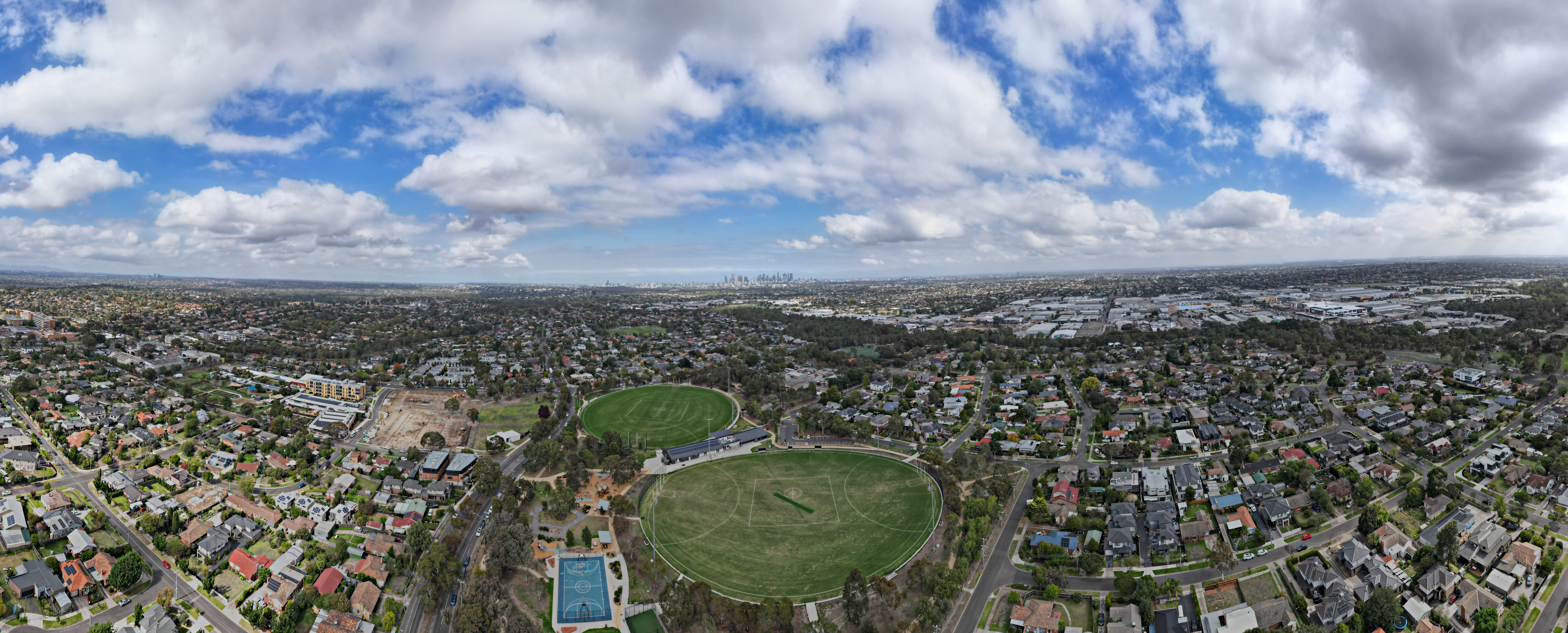
Darebin Creek at Bellfield from above, facing west to the Melbourne skyline

Darebin Creek is a creek that runs through the northern suburbs of Melbourne, Victoria, Australia. It is the main watercourse of the Darebin Valley and a major tributary of the Yarra River. For tens of thousands of years it was used as a food and tool source sustainably by the Wurundjeri people, Indigenous Australians of the Kulin nation alliance, who spoke variations of the Woiwurrung language group.

The creek rises on the northern urban fringe of Melbourne north of the suburb of Epping, following a general southerly route and meeting the Yarra at Alphington. The creek forms much of the municipal boundary between the City of Darebin and City of Banyule. Formerly an intermittent stream, increased stormwater runoff with urbanisation of the Darebin Creek catchment has resulted in permanent water flow.

The creek runs through Darebin Parklands, a large nature reserve one or two kilometres northwest of the junction at which the creek meets the Yarra. The Darebin Creek Trail runs along the banks in the lower reaches of the creek.

== Geography ==
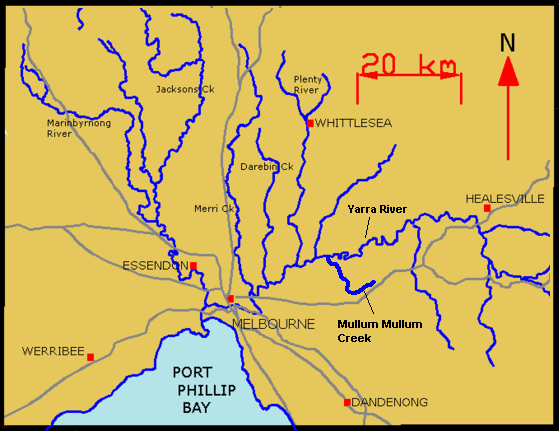
The Yarra River and its tributaries

The Darebin Creek's headwaters begin in Wollert, South Morang and even as far as Woodstock where they flow in a roughly southerly direction before meeting north of Epping.

=== Settlements ===
- Greater Melbourne - 3.8m

Alphington - 4,400
Ivanhoe - 10,600
Thornbury - 17,434
Preston - 29,925
Bundoora - 24,000
Lalor - 19,500
Epping - 19,200
South Morang - 12,300

- Wollert - 348
- Woodstock

== Parklands ==
Excellent examples of remnants of Melbourne’s early agricultural history can be seen within the Darebin Parklands in Alphington and Ivanhoe. The olive and other fruit trees within the park are more than a century old. The Darebin Creek Trail links many of these parks as it follows the course of the creek for much of its length. Below is a list of parklands that adjoin the Darebin Creek, listed from downstream to upstream:

- Yarra Bend Park
- Darebin Parklands
- Dundas Street Wetlands
- Olympic Park
- Sullivan's Park
- LaTrobe Wildlife Reserve
- Bundoora Park
