= Lalor, Victoria =

Lalor
- Suburb
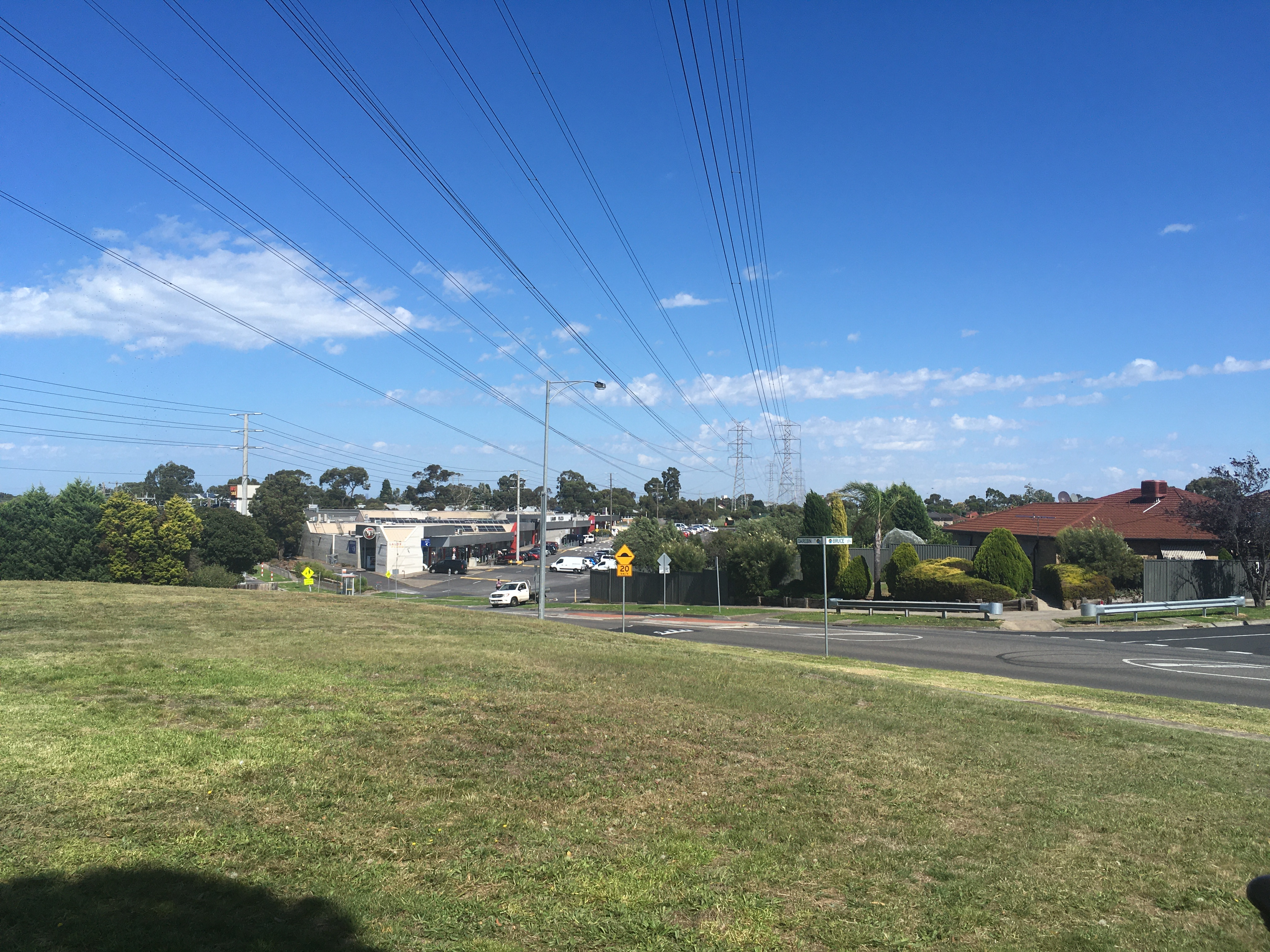
- Darebin Drive in Lalor

- Interactive map of Lalor
- Coordinates: 37.667°S 145.020°E
- Country: Australia
- State: Victoria
- City: Melbourne
- LGA: City of Whittlesea
- Location: 17 km (11 mi) N of Melbourne
- Established: 14 February 1947

Government
  - State electorate: Thomastown
  - Federal division: Scullin

Area
  - Total: 6.4 km^{2} (2.5 sq mi)
- Elevation: 95 m (312 ft)

Population
  - Total: 23,219 (SAL 2021)
- Postcode: 3075
Suburbs around Lalor
Campbellfield	Epping	Mill Park
Campbellfield	Lalor	Mill Park
Campbellfield	Thomastown	Bundoora

Lalor (/ˈlɔːlər/) is a suburb in Melbourne, Victoria, Australia, 17 km (11 mi) north of Melbourne's Central Business District, located within the City of Whittlesea local government area. Lalor recorded a population of 23,219 at the 2021 census.

Lalor was named in honour of Peter Lalor, a leader of the Eureka Stockade rebellion and later a member of the Victorian parliament. The suburb was named after the Peter Lalor Home Building Co-operative Society. In recent times, the mispronunciations /ˈleɪlɔːr, -lər/ has become predominant, whilst the Federal electorate of Lalor is still predominantly pronounced /ˈlɔːlər/.

The eastern and western borders of Lalor are defined by Darebin Creek and Merri Creek respectively.

== History ==
Lalor was originally a part of Thomastown. In 1945, Leo Purcell, while a patient at a military hospital on the Atherton Tableland, worked out a scheme to provide low-cost homes, that in February 1947 became known as the "Peter Lalor Co-operative Family Scheme", and with a group of ex-servicemen, formed the Peter Lalor Home Building Co-operative Society. The scheme was sponsored by the ex-servicemen's committee of the central executive of the Victorian Labor Party. They chose two hundred and fifty-eight acres east of today's Lalor railway station to be the site of the new developments, and the town planner Saxil Tuxen was hired to design a garden suburb.

Lalor Post Office was opened on 1 August 1949.

Although the Co-operative succeeded in beginning a program of house building, under-capitalization resulted in the venture being taken over by the War Service Homes Commission in 1954.

Originally built as the Mentone Fire Station, on the corner of Brindisi Street and Mentone Parade in Mentone in 1906, the building was relocated to 24 Vasey Street, Lalor, in 1957, to become the Lalor Fire Station. The Station was opened 30 January 1958, and was closed in 1997, and now served by the Epping Fire Station.

In 2010, Stockade Park was redeveloped. This site, enclosed by Paschke Crescent and leading to Rochdale Square, marks the location of the Peter Lalor home building co-operative's Stockade — an area that housed the tools and materials for the workers of the Co-operative that built Lalor.

=== Street names ===
Many streets in Lalor were named by the Peter Lalor Home Building Co-operative Society after prominent civilian and military figures.

== Education ==
In 1954, Lalor Primary School was opened, reaching an enrolment of 1,000 by 1971, when a further three primary schools were founded. Lalor North Primary School was established in 1971. Lalor East Primary School was established in 1972. Lalor West Primary School was opened in 1973 and merged with Lalor Park Primary School in 2011, to form Lalor Gardens Primary School.

Lalor Primary School was built on land owned by the Evans family, and held its 50th anniversary in 2004. Several of the surrounding streets are named after members of the Evans family (Evans Street, Ruth Street).

Lalor has two Catholic primary schools: St. Luke's Primary School Lalor, established in 1961, and St Catherine's Primary School, established in 1983.

Lalor also has three public secondary schools: Lalor Secondary College, previously known as Lalor High School, established in 1963, Peter Lalor College, previously Lalor Technical School, established in 1968, and reopened as the Peter Lalor Vocational College in 2012, and Lalor North Secondary College, previously known as Lalor North High School, established in 1977.

== Shopping ==
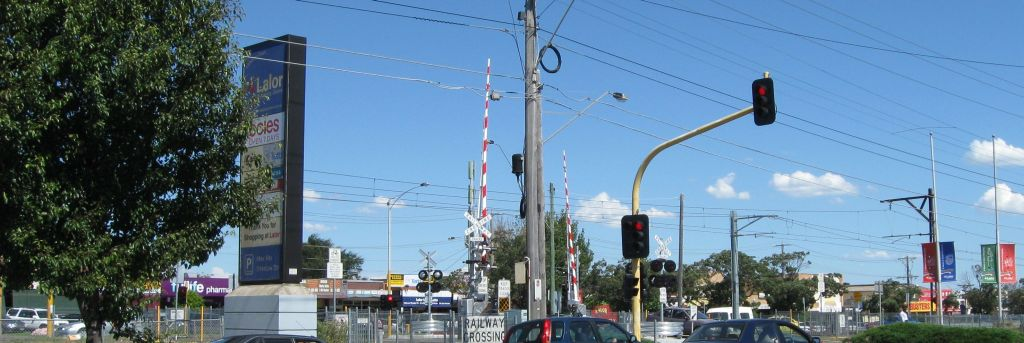
Lalor Shopping Centre viewed from Mann's Road Railway crossing

The Lalor Shopping Centre is located between Station Street and May Road, which parallels High Street—the main thoroughfare through Lalor—on the opposite side of the railway line. The land was previously owned by the Mann family. David Mann and his wife May (née Thomas, of Thomastown), who purchased it in 1920, and carried on dairy farming until it was sold in 1954. Retailers consist of many small specialty shops, as well as Coles and Woolworths supermarkets.

The Mann farmhouse, Bella Vista, stood just north of the Lalor Library in May Road.

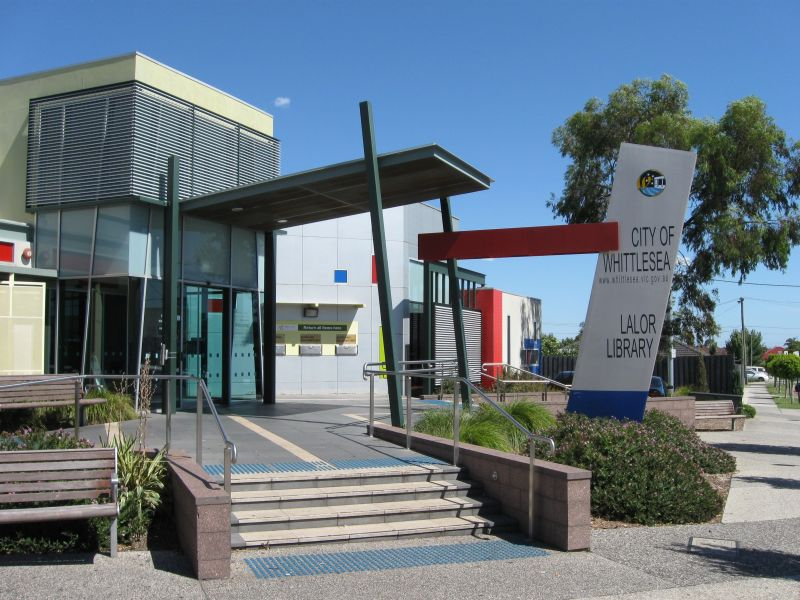
Lalor Library in May Road

Lalor Plaza in McKimmies Rd opened 1979 and Lalor Hub in Kingsway Drive are small enclosed shopping malls located respectively in the eastern and western residential areas of the suburb.

There are also a number of small shopping strips, including Rochdale Square Shops (named in commemoration of Rochdale, the first town built on co-operative principles), located near the Lalor railway station.

== Population ==
In the 2021 census, there were 23,219 people in Lalor. 47% of people were born in Australia. The next most common countries of birth were India 5.1%, Italy 4.7% and Macedonia 4.6%. 31.8% of people spoke only English at home. Other languages spoken at home included Arabic 10.6%, Macedonian 7.6%, Vietnamese 6.8%, Italian 6.3% and Greek 5.8%.

The most common responses for religion in Lalor were Catholic 22.7%, Islam 15.4 %, Eastern Orthodox 13.9% and No Religion 16.6%.

== Culture ==
- The Whittlesea Community Festival, celebrated since 1998, is held on the third Sunday in March in Lalor at the Whittlesea Public Gardens on Barry Road, regularly attracting more than 15,000 people.
- St Luke's Church holds La Festa di San Donato (The Festival of San Donato) annually in August.

== Recreation and leisure ==
The main public spaces for active recreation include the City of Whittlesea Gardens, which provides access to the Craigieburn Bypass Trail, Huskisson Avenue Reserve, a favourite spot for picnickers, V.R.Michael Reserve, Partridge Street Reserve, Lalor Reserve and W.A.Smith/Sycamore Reserves along the Darebin Creek, that provides a number of recreational facilities.

== Community facilities ==
An Lac Hanh Amitabha Hall, a Vietnamese Buddhist temple, is located in the suburb.

Lalor library is managed by Yarra Plenty Regional Library.

== Sport ==
- Lalor United Sloga Football Club was established in 1979.

Lalor have had up to three local Australian Rules Football teams competing in the Northern Football League:

- Lalor Bloods
- Lalor Stars folded in 2014
- West Lalor Dragons, established in 1973 folded in 2013. Ground now used for rugby league.

Lalor has two tennis clubs:

- Lalor Tennis Club, established in 1957 in Sydney Crescent, Lalor.
- West Lalor Tennis Club

Other sports include:

- The Lalor Bowling Club was established in 1962, and is located on the corner of Sydney Crescent and Gordon Street.
- The Lalor Stars Cricket Club was established in 1979, and is located at the W.A Smith Reserve in Darebin Drive.
- Lalor Parkrun was established in 2016, and meets every Saturday at 8am at City of Whittlesea Public Gardens, 158 Barry Road Lalor. Parkrun is a free 5 km timed walk or run put on for the community by the community.
- The Lalor Running Club was established in 2017, and organises several group runs for all abilities in Lalor and surrounds.

== Transport ==
=== Bus ===
Eight bus routes service Lalor:

- 357 : Wollert West – Thomastown station via Epping station. Operated by Dysons.
- 554 : Thomastown station – Thomastown station via West Lalor (clockwise loop). Operated by Dysons.
- 555 : Pacific Epping – Northland Shopping Centre via Lalor, Thomastown and Reservoir. Operated by Dysons.
- 556 : Pacific Epping – Northland Shopping Centre via Keon Park station. Operated by Dysons.
- 557 : Thomastown station – Thomastown station via West Lalor (anti clockwise loop). Operated by Dysons.
- 559 : Thomastown station – Thomastown station via Darebin Drive (anti clockwise loop). Operated by Dysons.
- 566 : Lalor – Northland Shopping Centre via Childs Road, Plenty Road and Grimshaw Street. Operated by Dysons.
- 570 : Thomastown station – RMIT University Bundoora Campus. Operated by Dysons.

=== Cycling ===
The Craigieburn Bypass Trail, which follows the Hume Freeway, runs to the west of the suburb and provides facilities for recreational and commuting cyclists.

=== Train ===
One railway station serves Lalor: Lalor, located on the Mernda line.

== See also ==
- Westgarthtown, an historic village within Lalor
