= Darebin Creek Trail =

Shared use path in Melbourne, Australia

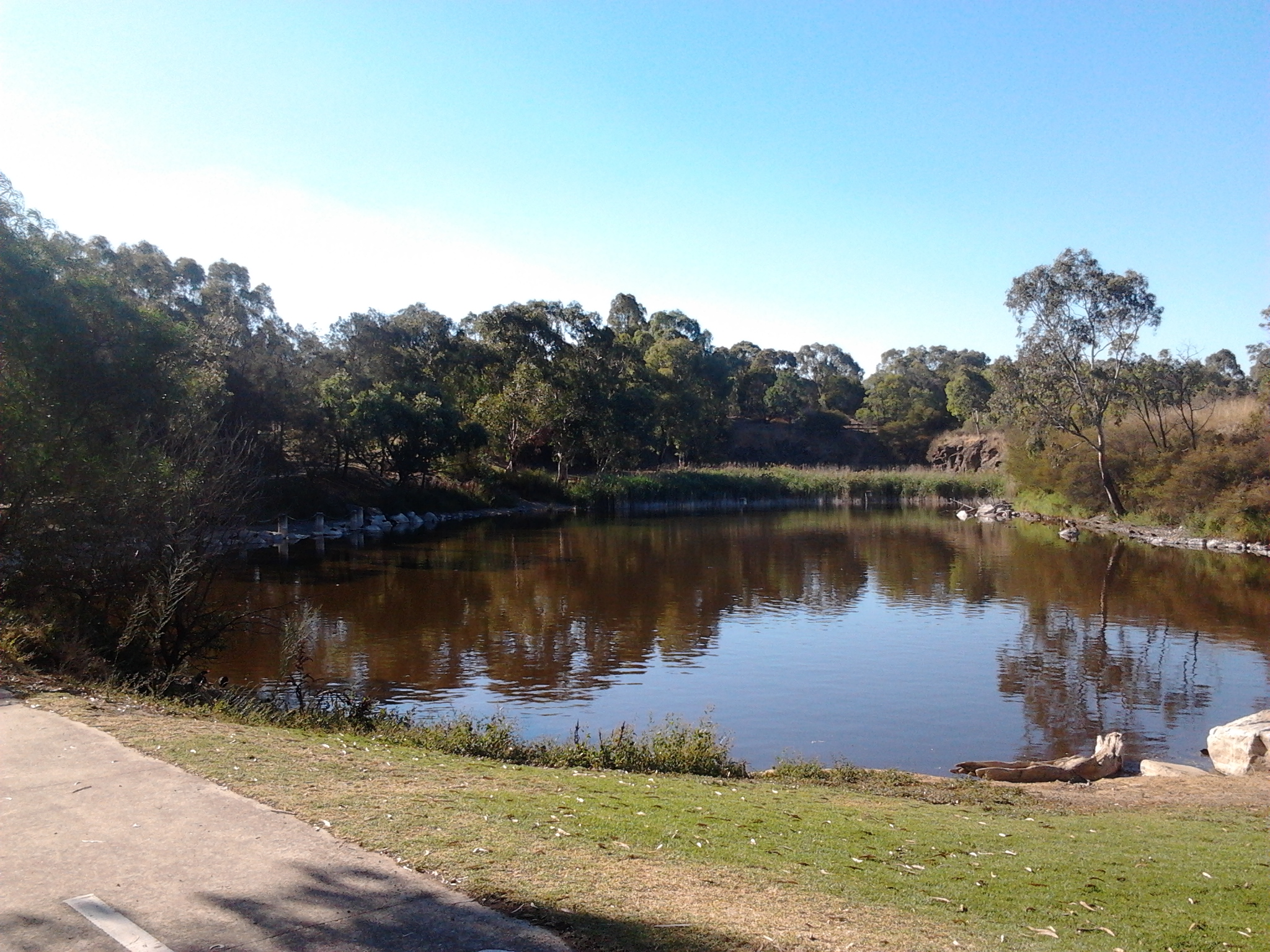
- Darebin Parklands on the Lower Darebin part of the trail
- Length: About 25 km
- Location: Melbourne, Victoria, Australia
- Difficulty: Medium
- Hazards: Gaps in the trail; Swooping magpies during breeding season
- Hills: Some uphill work along intersecting Western Ring Road trail (traveling North-East)
- Train(s): Epping, Darebin stations
- Tram: Route 86 tram

The Darebin Creek Trail is a shared-use path for cyclists and pedestrians which follows Darebin Creek in the inner and outer northern suburbs of Melbourne, Victoria, Australia.

The path consists of an 8-kilometre (5.0 mi) section north of the Western Ring Road and a 17-kilometre (11 mi) section south of the Western Ring Road. The two sections are separated by a 0.85-kilometre (0.53 mi) section of path along the Western Ring Road Trail.

Bicycle Victoria announced on 7 August 2009 on its web site that the Victorian Civil and Administrative Tribunal (VCAT) had approved the issuing of permits for the Lower Darebin Trail and associated bridge over the Yarra. Work on the Lower Darebin trail started late in 2010, and is expected to be completed in 2015.

== Route ==
The northern section starts on the very edge of suburban Melbourne next to open countryside. Travelling south through remnant vegetation and 2.2 km later, one arrives at Hendersons Rd. Epping railway station is 500m to the west along Hendersons Rd and the station is soon followed by Epping Plaza.

The path intersects with the Hendersons Road Drain Trail at Childs Road.

900m later the path forks to the left and right. After 2 km, McKimmies Road is approached. The path does not proceed under the road. It crosses McKimmies Road and continues on for 1.6 km through Thomastown East Reserve. A small wetland nearby harbours the growling grass frog.

The path intersects with the Western Ring Road Trail, travelling 850m east along the Western Ring Road Trail to where the Darebin Creek Trail continues to the south on its west bank, crossing under the Western Ring Road.

Leaving the Western Ring Road Trail the southern section starts by descending to the creek and tracking along the west bank of the creek. After crossing McCleans Road, the path splits in two, as it enters a Norris Bank Reserve. It rejoins at the far end of the reserve at Settlement Road.

On the south side of Settlement Road the path continues on the west side of the creek for 2.6 km until it reaches the eastern end of Rathcown Rd, by a paddock full of shaggy sheep where there is a new bridge crossing. (An on-road shortcut is to continue west along Rathcown Rd for 600 metres to a path on the left that re-connects to the Darebin Creek trail). The trail crosses to the eastern side where the path continues to a T-intersection where the path to the right follows the creek, left connects to Bundoora Park via Waters Way. An unsigned path looms up on the left, that leads to the Bundoora campus of La Trobe University and is surveyed by a lone park bench.

A footbridge crosses to the east bank of the creek 800 metres (2,600 ft) later. The trail continues south past another footbridge on the right (west) that leads to Northland Shopping Centre.

An asphalt section meets a crossing with a concrete section one kilometre (0.62 mi) later.

Three km later the trail meets the north end of Ford Grove. The trail continues past the south end of Ford Grove. After another 500m the trail forks at a wooden boardwalk section: to the east it crosses a footbridge. The trail continues westward towards Smith Street, passing under a large and high steel bridge that carries the Hurstbridge railway line, and then under the bluestone and concrete Darebin Creek Bridge (Heidelberg Road) before finishing at Sparks Reserve.

The pedestrian and cycling bridge spanning the Yarra River, connecting the Darebin Creek Trail to the Main Yarra Trail, was opened on 25 March 2018. Community advocacy groups worked over a twenty-year period to achieve this impressive outcome.

== Epping to South Morang rail extension ==
The extension of the rail line from Epping to South Morang intersects the Darebin Creek Trail in the vicinity of Sunrise Court and Maywood Drive, the Hendersons Road Drain Trail near Maywood Drive and the route to the City of Whittlesea's Mill Park Leisure Centre in Morang Drive.

== Connections ==
Dead end in the north at Porsche Crt. Intersects the Hendersons Road Drain Trail in Mill Park at Childs Rd and the Western Ring Road Trail in Bundoora.

Connects to the Main Yarra Trail in the south.

North end at 37.635830°S 145.034885°E. South end at 37.790095°S 145.042660°E.
