= Woodstock, Victoria =

Woodstock
- Town
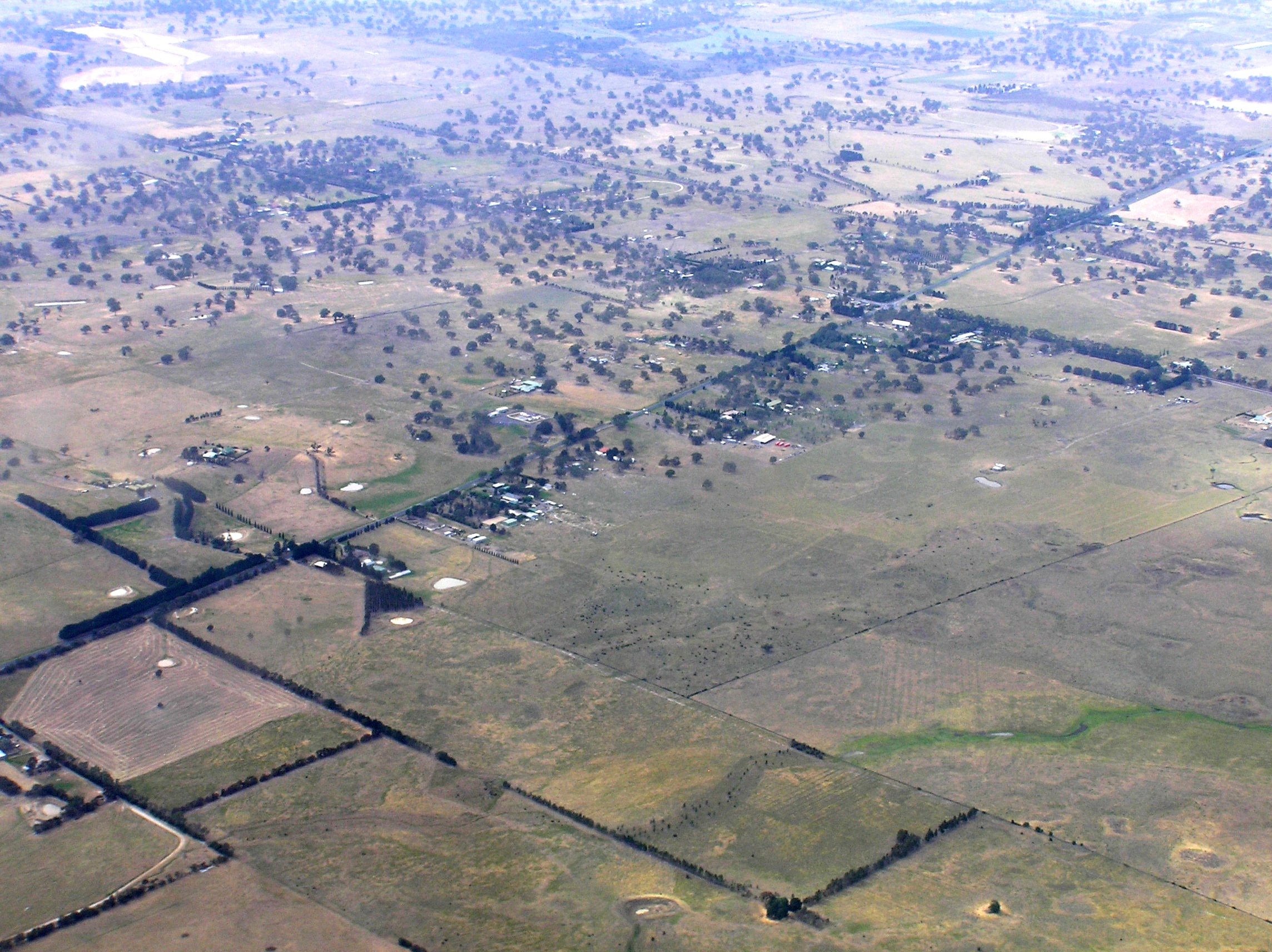
- Merriang Road area of Woodstock, from the north-west

- Interactive map of Woodstock
- Coordinates: 37.544°S 145.056°E
- Country: Australia
- State: Victoria
- LGA: City of Whittlesea

Government
  - State electorate: Yan Yean
  - Federal division: McEwen

Population
  - Total: 150 (2021 census)
- Postcode: 3751
Localities around Woodstock
Beveridge	Eden Park	Whittlesea
Donnybrook	Woodstock	Yan Yean
Wollert	Mernda	Mernda

Woodstock is a locality in Victoria, Australia, located just north of Melbourne's outer suburbs, located within the City of Whittlesea local government area. Woodstock recorded a population of 150 at the 2021 census.

Australian contemporary poet and author Robbie Coburn hails from Woodstock. Former Western Australian premier Philip Collier was born and raised in Woodstock.

== History ==
Woodstock Post Office opened on 9 January 1858 and closed in 1971. To the west Woodstock West Post office opened in 1877 and continued operating until 1959. In September 1876 a small timber Catholic church, known as the church of St. Patrick, was erected for local worshippers.

Deputations were made to the Victorian government during the 1890s to bring a railway line through the area. It was decided that the Sydney-Melbourne rail corridor would run to the west, parallel with the Hume Highway, and so the closest railway station is at Donnybrook, approximately 8 km (5 mi) away.

== Books on Woodstock ==
Jones, Michael Nature's Plenty: a history of the City of Whittlesea, Sydney, N.S.W. Allen & Unwin, 1992 ISBN 1863730761
