= Epping Secondary College =

School in Epping, Victoria, Australia

Coordinates: 37°38′41″S 145°02′00″E

Epping Secondary College is a secondary school located in Epping, Victoria, Australia. Education is provided for years 7–12 on one campus and offers VCE, VM and VET courses in years 11 and 12. The current principal is Neil baillie .

The school was founded in 1976 and built up in size slowly over the years. In 2025, the total student count is 1003. In 1990, Epping Park High School changed its name to Epping Secondary College.
