= Epping, Victoria =

Epping
- Suburb
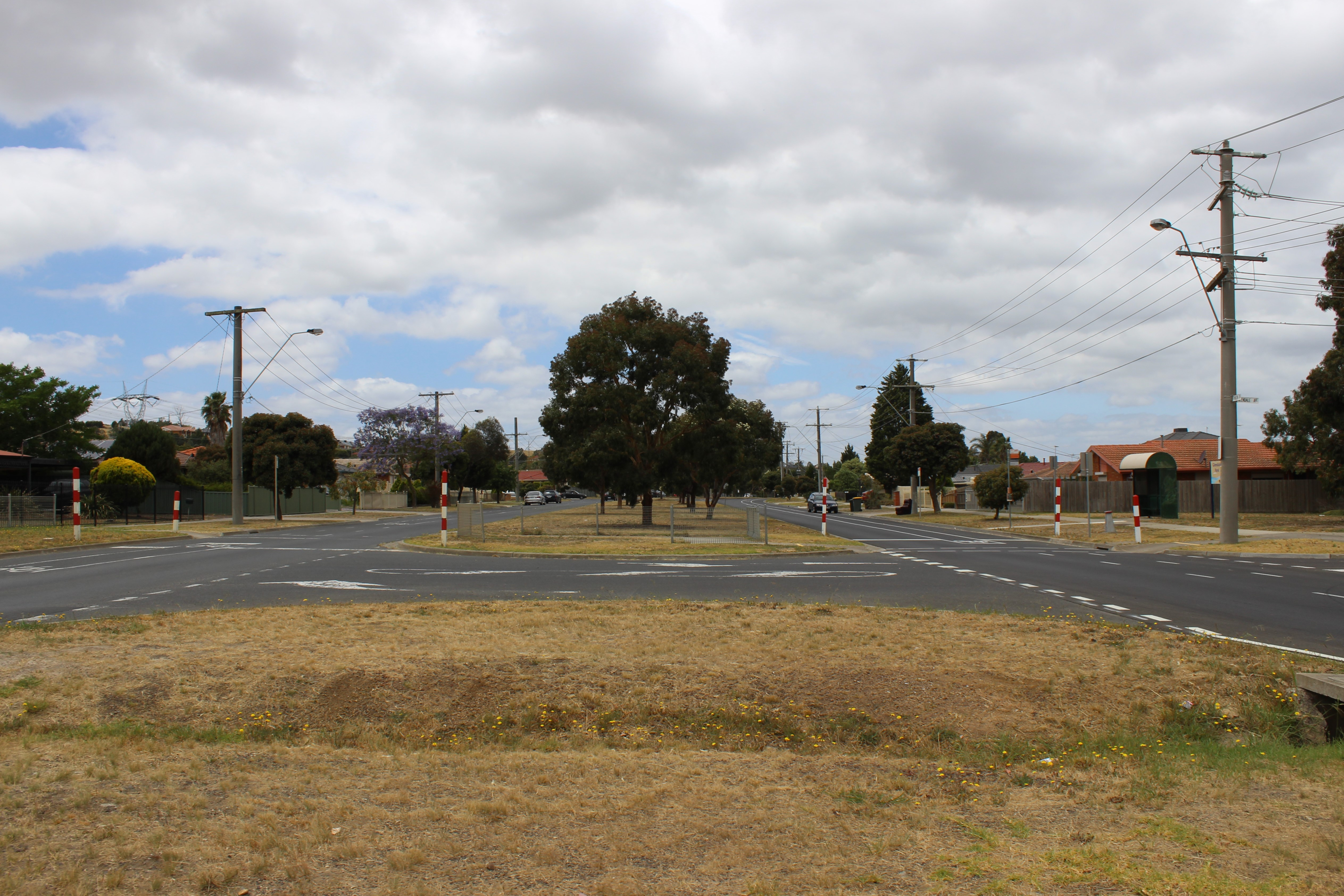
- Findon Road, Epping

- Interactive map of Epping
- Coordinates: 37°38′16″S 145°01′35″E
- Country: Australia
- State: Victoria
- City: Melbourne
- LGA: City of Whittlesea
- Location: 18 km (11 mi) N of Melbourne
- Established: 1853

Government
  - State electorates: Mill Park; Thomastown
  - Federal division: Scullin

Area
  - Total: 14.8 km^{2} (5.7 sq mi)
- Elevation: 137 m (449 ft)

Population
  - Total: 33,489 (SAL 2021)
- Postcode: 3076
Suburbs around Epping
Craigieburn	Wollert	South Morang
Somerton	Epping	South Morang
Campbellfield	Lalor	Mill Park

Epping is a suburb in Melbourne, Victoria, Australia, 18 km (11 mi) north of Melbourne's central business district, located within the City of Whittlesea local government area. Epping recorded a population of 33,489 at the 2021 census.

== Boundaries and terrain ==
Epping is bounded by Mill Park and Lalor to the south, Somerton to the west, South Morang to the east and Wollert to the north.

Epping has a mainly flat terrain though, towards the north, lie several large hills, which provide an excellent view of Melbourne. McDonalds Road and High Street are the main thoroughfares. The majority of commercial activity is located on High Street and Cooper Street, where Pacific Epping is located.

== History ==
A village reserve was surveyed in 1839, where Epping later developed. The village was named Epping, after Epping Forest, in 1853, by which time a hotel (from 1844) and a Catholic school were established. Epping Post Office opened on 1 September 1857. The Epping Road Board was established a year later. In 1870, the area around Epping became Darebin Shire, which was renamed Epping Shire in 1893, until it was united with Whittlesea Shire in 1915. By the time the Shire was created, Epping township contained several churches, hotels and a state school, as well as church school. Farmers of Irish origin predominated, but English, Scots and Germans settled there. There were several dairy farms. The Melbourne to Whittlesea railway (1889–1960) had a station at Epping, and the main areas to benefit were the transport of milk and quarry products.

The original Epping township is on higher ground west of the Darebin Creek (the Catholic Church being the only one not to have moved from lower flood-risk land). Several older buildings are constructed in bluestone, plentiful in the surrounding volcanic plains.

Major suburban development took place from the 1970s onwards, and the northern fringes of the area are currently in the process of being developed for housing.

During the 2020 COVID-19 pandemic, Epping was one of the more heavily affected areas of Melbourne, as it was host to several large virus outbreaks, including the Epping Gardens Aged Care outbreak, which claimed the lives of 38 elderly residents during the second wave in Melbourne.

In 2022, Major Road Projects Victoria are implementing the Epping Road upgrade, which includes adding extra lanes, new traffic lights, upgrading existing intersections and pedestrian lights, building a new shared walking and cycling path, adding on-road bicycle lands and installing safety barriers along the road.

== Facilities ==
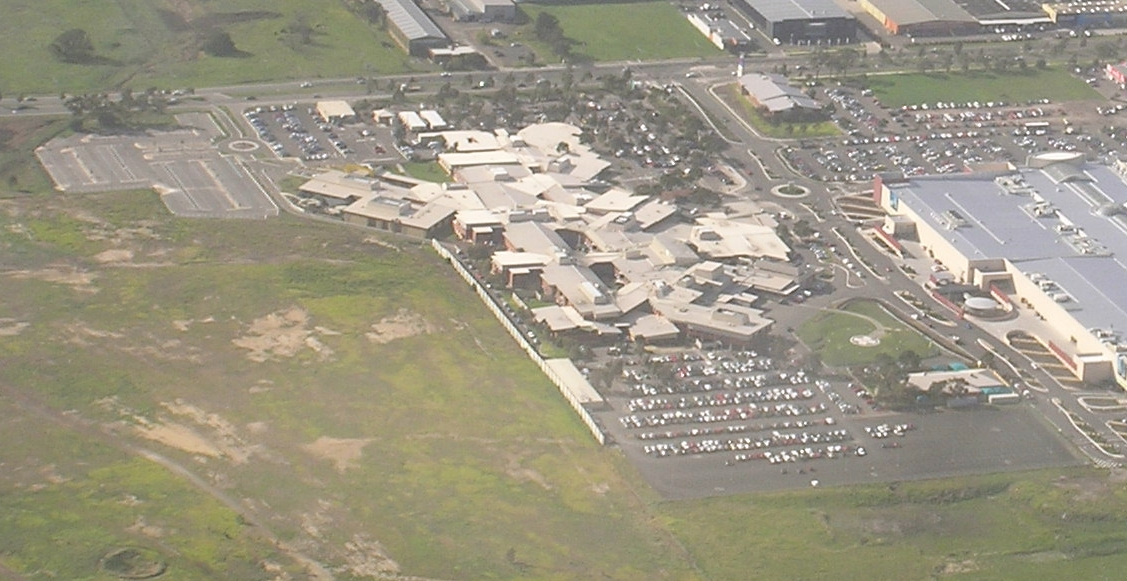
The Northern Hospital from the south

One of Melbourne's many shopping centres, Pacific Epping, is located 500 metres (550 yd) away from the Epping railway station. The Northern Hospital adjoins it. Dalton Village is a small shopping centre which is located on Dalton Road in Epping. There are many parks and reserves located throughout the suburb.

A public library click and collect service operates five days a week, with regular story time sessions at the Galada Community Centre Hub. It is managed by Yarra Plenty Regional Library. Their mobile library also stops weekly in Epping.

== Education ==
There are several government and private schools in Epping, including one of the biggest Catholic High Schools in Australia; St Monica's College, and the second largest public school in Victoria; Mill Park Secondary College, with its senior campus located in the east of Epping, as well as Epping Secondary College and Lalor North Secondary College. Primary schools include Epping Primary School, opening in 1872, Epping Views Primary School, Greenbrook Primary School, Meadow Glen Primary School and St Peter's Primary School.

Melbourne Polytechnic has a campus at Epping, which was developed in 1992 with State Government funding. Along with Melbourne Polytechnic rural training centres of Northern Lodge Equine Stud farm at Eden Park, a farm at Yan Yean and the Growling Frog Vineyard, the Epping campus of Melbourne Polytechnic is the largest provider in Victoria of training to the agriculture sector, offering courses from certificate to bachelor's degree level in Aquaculture, Equine Studies, Agriculture and Land Management and Viticulture and Winemaking. A new Green Skills Centre, built in 2009/2010, provides courses and training in renewable energy, sustainable design and building and construction. The campus boasts one of Victoria's few indoor recirculating aquaculture facilities. Many other vocational education and training courses are also available.

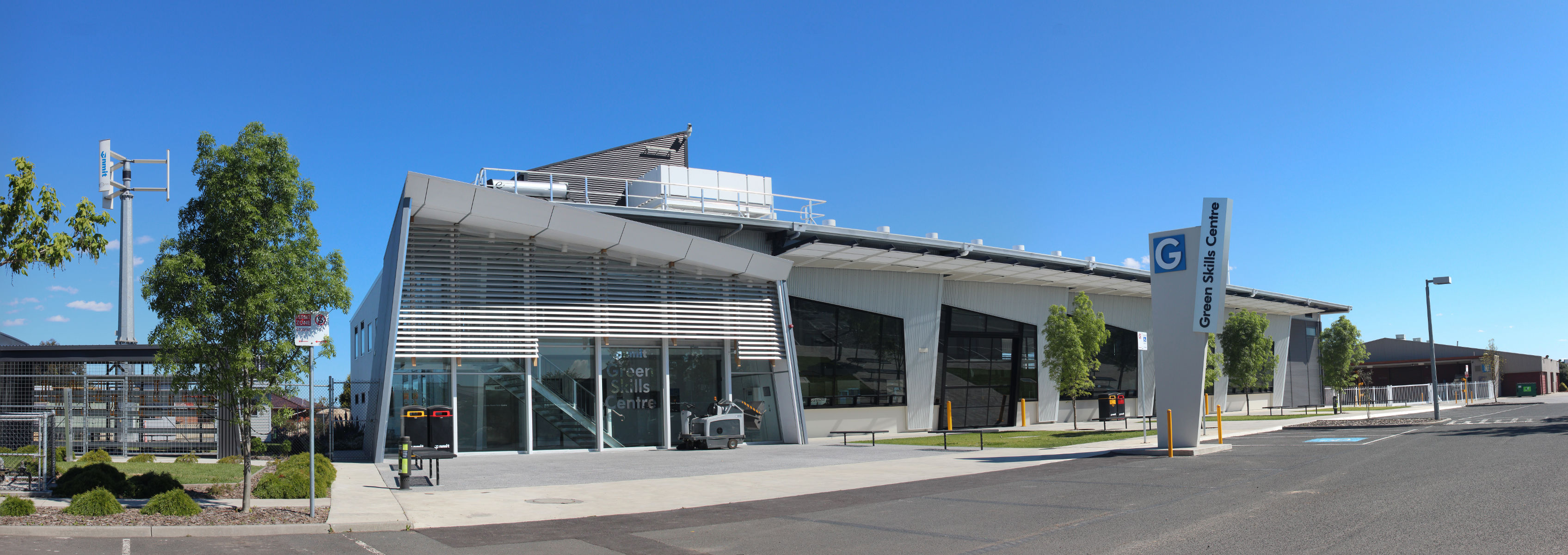
Green Skills Centre on NMIT Epping Campus rated by the Green Building Council of Australia as 5 GreenStar

== Transport ==
=== Bus ===
Nine bus routes service Epping:

- 356 : Epping station – Wollert East via Hayston Boulevard. Operated by Dysons.
- 357 : Wollert West – Thomastown station via Epping station. Operated by Dysons.
- 358 : Epping station – Wollert via Pacific Epping. Operated by Dysons.
- 555 : Pacific Epping – Northland Shopping Centre via Lalor, Thomastown and Reservoir. Operated by Dysons.
- 556 : Pacific Epping – Northland Shopping Centre via Keon Park station. Operated by Dysons.
- 566 : Lalor – Northland Shopping Centre via Childs Road, Plenty Road and Grimshaw Street. Operated by Dysons.
- 569 : Pacific Epping – South Morang station. Operated by Dysons.
- 577 : Pacific Epping – South Morang station via Findon Road. Operated by Dysons.
- SmartBus 901 : Frankston station – Melbourne Airport. Operated by Kinetic Melbourne.

=== Train ===
Epping is served by Epping station, which is located on the Mernda line.

== Sport ==
- Epping Football Netball Club, an Australian rules football team, competes in the Northern Football Netball League.
- Epping Tennis Club is also located next to the Epping Football Club.
- The Meadowglen International Athletics Stadium offers an international standard, all-weather synthetic athletics facility. It is managed by the City of Whittlesea.
- Epping City, an Association Football Club, competes in the Victorian State League 3.
- Epping Stadium is located off Harvest Home Road, and is currently the home ground of Whittlesea Ranges FC. The ground has hosted several clubs from the national leagues, including the National Soccer League and A-league.

== See also ==
- Aurora, Victoria
