= South Morang =

- Suburb
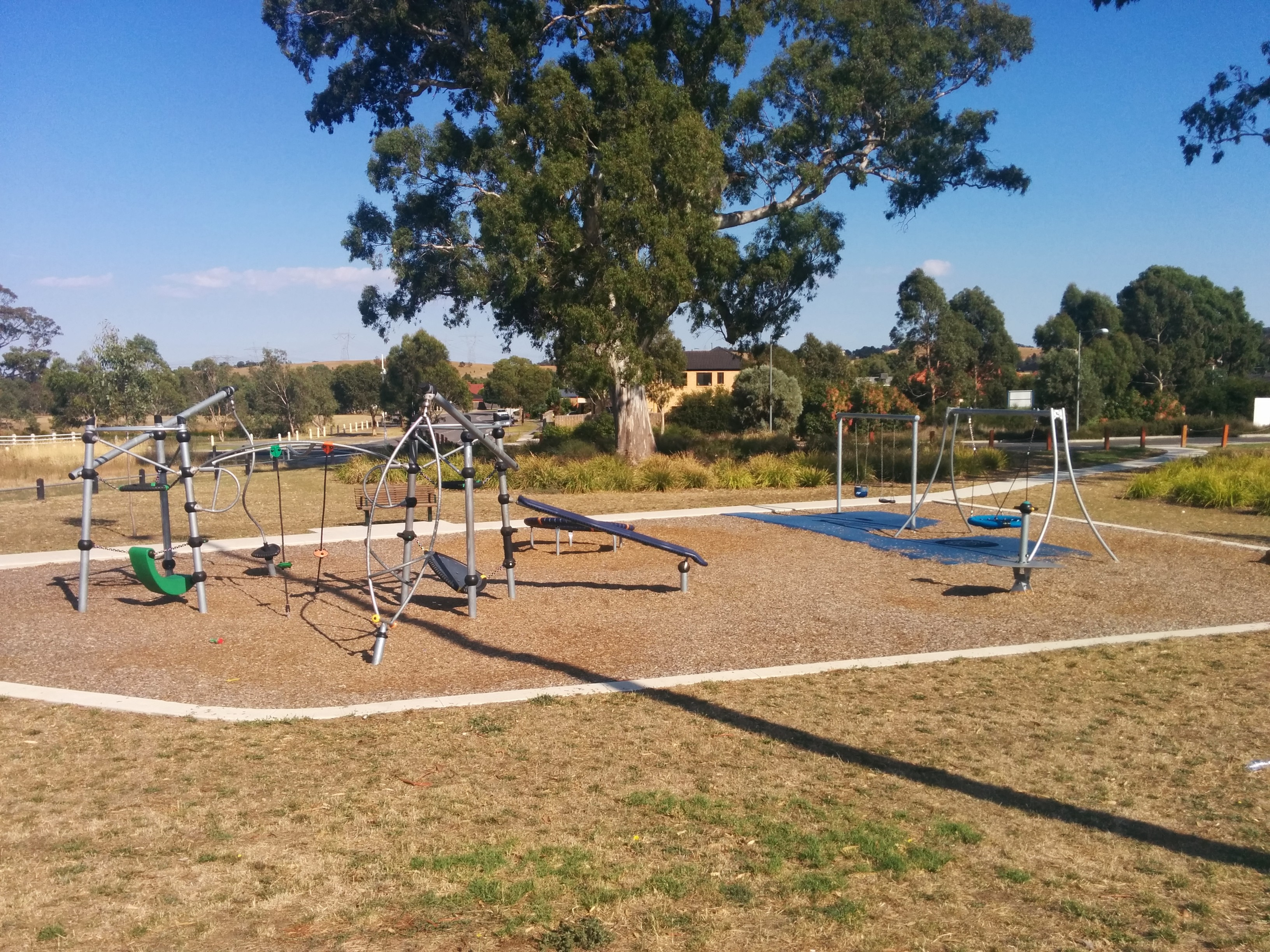
- Hillsview Recreation Reserve

- Interactive map of South Morang
- Coordinates: 37°38′S 145°05′E
- Country: Australia
- State: Victoria
- City: Melbourne
- LGA: City of Whittlesea
- Location: 20 km (12 mi) from Melbourne

Government
  - State electorate: Mill Park
  - Federal division: Scullin

Area
  - Total: 5.9 km^{2} (2.3 sq mi)

Population
  - Total: 24,989 (2021 census)
  - Density: 4,240/km^{2} (10,970/sq mi)
- Postcode: 3752
Suburbs around South Morang
Wollert	Mernda	Doreen
Epping	South Morang	Yarrambat
Lalor	Mill Park	Plenty

South Morang (/məˈræŋ/ mor-ANG) is a suburb of Melbourne, Victoria, Australia, 20 km north-east of Melbourne's central business district, located within the City of Whittlesea local government area. South Morang recorded a population of 24,989 at the 2021 census.

Originally known as Morang South, South Morang grew from a country area on the outskirts of Melbourne in the late 1990s/early 2000s to a suburban area with new estates being developed.

== History ==
Before the arrival of European explorers and farmers, the area now called South Morang was inhabited by the Wurundjeri balug and Wurundjeri Willam clans. South Morang was originally known as 'Morang South' until Morang itself was renamed by the locals to Yan Yean South in 1893 - as it is the suburb lying directly below Yan Yean. ‘Morang’ is an ancient aboriginal word meaning ‘sky’ or ‘cloud’. In 1824, William Hovell and Hamilton Hume were the first Europeans to set foot in what is now the City of Whittlesea when they were going from Sydney to Port Philip Bay. On 14 December 1824, they wrote in their journals:

Having passed through the first plain... myself and Mr Hume ascended a high but single hill. In front of which we saw a very gratifying sight. This was a very extensive plain extending from west to south-east for several miles, with patches of forest which appear to separate one plain from another. But the whole appeared in front, say south, to be level, but in parts in the plains some hills arose of a conical shape, with only here and there a few trees upon them. And all the soil of best quality.

The description showed that the land was good for farming, and it was settled by John Batman's pastoral group in the 1830s. Robert Hoddle surveyed the land in 1837. The land failed to sell at first and was opened to pastoral leases. It was leased by William Forlonge in 1846. By 1840, the area was owned by rich landowners. By the 1850s, the area was used for farming. Much evidence of the farming, such as dry stone walls, can still be seen today. In 1852, William Ford Cleeland bought 256 hectares and subdivided and sold the land, doubling his money. Individual land holdings have decreased in size over time.

Morang South Post Office opened on 24 November 1873. The post office has now moved to Westfield Plenty Valley.

The railway from Melbourne to here was finished in 1889. The old South Morang railway station served the Whittlesea steam railway line until the 1950s. It was further north than the current station.

== Facilities ==
Mill Park Library is the nearest public library and is managed by Yarra Plenty Regional Library.

== Today ==
South Morang's ethnically diverse surrounding suburbs (such as Mill Park and Epping) have added to its ethnic diversity as residents of those suburbs move to South Morang.

The most common ancestries in South Morang (According to the 2016 census) were Australian born 17.0%, English 16.3%, Italian 12.8%, Indian 7.2% and Macedonian 5.4%.

South Morang is also home to many sites of historical and cultural significance and figures, such as Farm Vigano and Le Page Homestead at Plenty Gorge Park

The Lakes South Morang P-9 School opened in 2007.

== Transport ==
South Morang is served by South Morang, Middle Gorge, and Hawkstowe railway stations, all of which are located on the Mernda railway line. The suburb is also served by numerous bus routes.

== Sport ==
South Morang Cricket Club competes in the Diamond Valley Cricket Association (formerly Eltham District Cricket Association) since 1937. 2022/23 saw the club win 4 premierships making it the most successful season in the clubs history. The club is also working hard to trace its roots back to the original club that dates back to 1883/84 Thanks to the hard work of club historian Jack Hoar.

South Morang Football Club, an Australian rules football team, competes in the Northern Football League and are based at Mill Park Lakes. Brownlow medallist Kevin Murray played football for South Morang after his retirement from the AFL.

It is also home to the Northern District Softball Association, with multiple clubs playing at its site in Mill Park.
