= Mill Park Secondary College =

Location
- 19–33 Civic Drive, Epping; 9–25 Moorhead Drive, Mill Park; Victoria; Australia; 37°38′45″S 145°3′46″E

Information
- Type: Public state-run high school
- Status: Open
- Staff: 175
- Teaching staff: 130
- Years offered: 7–12
- Enrolment: 1696 (2011)
- Slogan: Create Your Future
- Website: https://www.millparksc.vic.edu.au/

Mill Park Secondary College is a government high school located in Epping, Victoria, Australia with its Junior Campus located on Moorhead Drive Mill Park and its Senior Campus located on Civic Drive. The high school was built in the early 1990s for the residents of Mill Park, however due to population growth, a Senior campus was established around 1997 for students entering the years of 10, 11 and 12. In the current day, Mill Park Secondary College has approximately 1,820 students.

== Education ==
The school provides many levels of education ranging from a S.E.A.L. (select entry accelerated learning program) program to an "Extension" program (an advanced class that provides higher education to children who are not eligible for S.E.A.L. but are too advanced for mainstream) and Main Stream (normal classes for the standard of students). Other than SEAL, the school provides S.T.E.M. which is also known as Accelerated Science and Accelerated English.

Of students who left the school at the end of 2010 at least 98% of students found employment, while 100% of students went on to further education.

== Houses ==
All houses are named after horses that were raced in the twentieth century, and were owned by the owner of the Mill Park Stables. The houses are also used for The House challenge. Participating in athletics events would help earn points for your house.

- Redleap (Red House): All grades ending with the letter R (7AR 8BR 9CR)
- Eaglet (Yellow House): All grades ending with the letter E (7AE 8BE 9CE)
- Studley (Green House): All grades ending with the letter S (7BS 7AS 8BS 9CS)
- Whernside (Blue House): All grades ending with the letter W (7AW 8BW 9CW)
