= City of Whittlesea =

Coordinates: 37°33′S 145°05′E

- Local government area
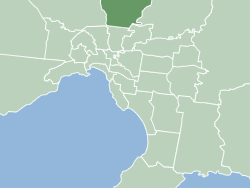
- Map of Melbourne showing City of Whittlesea

- Interactive map of City of Whittlesea
- Country: Australia
- State: Victoria
- Region: Greater Melbourne
- Established: 1862
- Council seat: South Morang

Government
  - Mayor: Lawrie Cox
  - State electorates: Bundoora; Eildon; Mill Park; Thomastown; Yan Yean
  - Federal divisions: Jagajaga; McEwen; Scullin

Area
  - Total: 490 km^{2} (190 sq mi)

Population
  - Total: 245,029 (2023)
  - Density: 500/km^{2} (1,295/sq mi)
- Website: City of Whittlesea
LGAs around City of Whittlesea
Mitchell	Mitchell	Murrindindi
Hume	City of Whittlesea	Nillumbik
Merri-bek	Darebin	Banyule

The City of Whittlesea is a local government area located in the outer northern suburbs of Melbourne, the state capital of Victoria, Australia. The city covers an area of 490 square kilometres (189.2 sq mi), and in June 2023, it had an estimated population of 245,029 and is one of Victoria's fastest growing Municipalities.

== History ==
What became the City of Whittlesea had its origins in two separate roads districts (an early, single-purpose form of local government). The first, Whittlesea Roads District, was incorporated on 12 December 1862. On 1 January 1875 it was amalgamated with the Merriang riding of the Shire of Darebin to create the Shire of Whittlesea. The second, Epping Roads District, was incorporated on 21 July 1870. It was then enlarged on 11 January 1859 and then again on 25 July 1864 to cover the Northcote area. On 26 September 1870 it was merged with Merriang Roads District, Upper Plenty Roads District and Woodstock Roads District to form the Shire of Darebin. Part of the Shire of Darebin was then excised to create the Shire of Jika in 1872, and, as stated above, Merriang riding was merged with the Whittlesea Roads District to form the Shire of Whittlesea in 1875. The Shire of Darebin was renamed the Shire of Epping on 22 March 1894. On 1 October 1915, the Shire of Epping was absorbed by the Shire of Whittlesea as part of a restructuring of local government outside the Melbourne metropolitan area in Victoria.

On 31 May 1955, parts of the City of Broadmeadows were annexed to Shire of Whittlesea and the neighbouring Shire of Bulla. The population grew rapidly as urbanisation reached the southern edge of the shire. In 1979 an internal redistribution took place creating the four ridings based on population and on 30 March 1988 it was proclaimed by the Governor of Victoria as a City, effective from 15 April of that year. Until the amalgamations of the mid-1990s, the city was 598.3 square kilometres (231.0 sq mi) in size.

On 15 December 1994, massive local government reform once again affected Whittlesea's boundaries, although unlike most, the City survived largely intact. 18% of its land area was ceded to entities created in 1994 – the Doreen and Arthurs Creek districts were lost to the new Shire of Nillumbik, while Kinglake West went to Shire of Murrindindi and Somerton to the City of Hume.

The City before the 1994 reforms (green) and the City's modern boundary (brown)

Until April 1993, the council met at the Shire Office at High Street and Houston Street, Epping, next to the primary school. In that month, it moved to its present headquarters in Ferres Boulevard, South Morang. The original premises in Epping is now a council depot.

The City of Whittlesea is a culturally diverse community with the 2021 Census recording that 41.9% of residents were born overseas.

Whittlesea 2040 is a long-term vision for the city and guides the council's work and future partnerships with the community and others.

== Council ==
After a three-month investigation into administrative and governing issues, on 20 March 2020 the Victorian state government dismissed Whittlesea council and replaced them with three administrators who governed for four years.

2024 ward boundaries. Expand the map and click on a ward to see the ward name.

=== Current composition ===
Party	Councillors
Independent	6
Labor	3
Independent Labor	1
Community Independents	1
Total	11

The current council, elected in 2024, is:

Ward	Councillor	Party	Notes
Bundoora	Daniela Zinni	Independent	
Epping	David Lenberg	Independent	
Ganbu Gulinj	Lawrie Cox	Labor	Mayor (since 2025)
Kirrip	Aidan McLindon	Community Independents	Previously vacant in 2025 after suspension of sitting councillor
Lalor	Michael Labrador	Independent	
Mernda	Jarrod Lappin	Labor	
Mill Park	Blair Colwell	Independent	Deputy Mayor (since 2025)
North	Christine Stow	Independent	
Painted Hills	Deb Gunn	Labor	
South Morang	Martin Taylor	Independent	
Thomastown	Chaman Tiwari	Independent Labor	

=== Wards ===
Historically, Shire of Whittlesea was divided into four ridings, each electing three Councillors. When it became a City in 1988, these were converted into wards:

- Centre Ward (formerly Yan Yean Riding, then Central Riding)
- East Ward (formerly Morang Riding, then South East Riding)
- West Ward (formerly Thomastown Riding, then South West Riding)
- North Ward (formerly Whittlesea Riding, then North Riding)

Over a number of elections there have been changes to the number of wards and Councillors. In 1994 Whittlesea was re-subdivided into nine wards, each with one Councillor. At the 2005 election the Victorian Electoral Commission reviewed the ward boundaries and composition. This resulted in three wards, each electing three Councillors.

At the 2012 General Election the three wards were retained, however changes were made to ward boundaries to reflect the municipality's growing population. In total eleven Councillors were elected:

- North Ward (3 Councillors)
- South-East Ward (4 Councillors)
- South-West Ward (4 Councillors)

Ahead of the October 2024 local government elections, the City of Whittlesea changed to an 11 single-Councillor ward structure, comprising 11 electoral wards with one Councillor per ward:

- Bundoora Ward
- Epping Ward
- Ganbu Gulinj Ward
- Kirrip Ward
- Lalor Ward
- Mernda Ward
- Mill Park Ward
- North Ward
- Painted Hills Ward
- South Morang Ward
- Thomastown Ward.

== Main suburbs ==
=== Bundoora ===
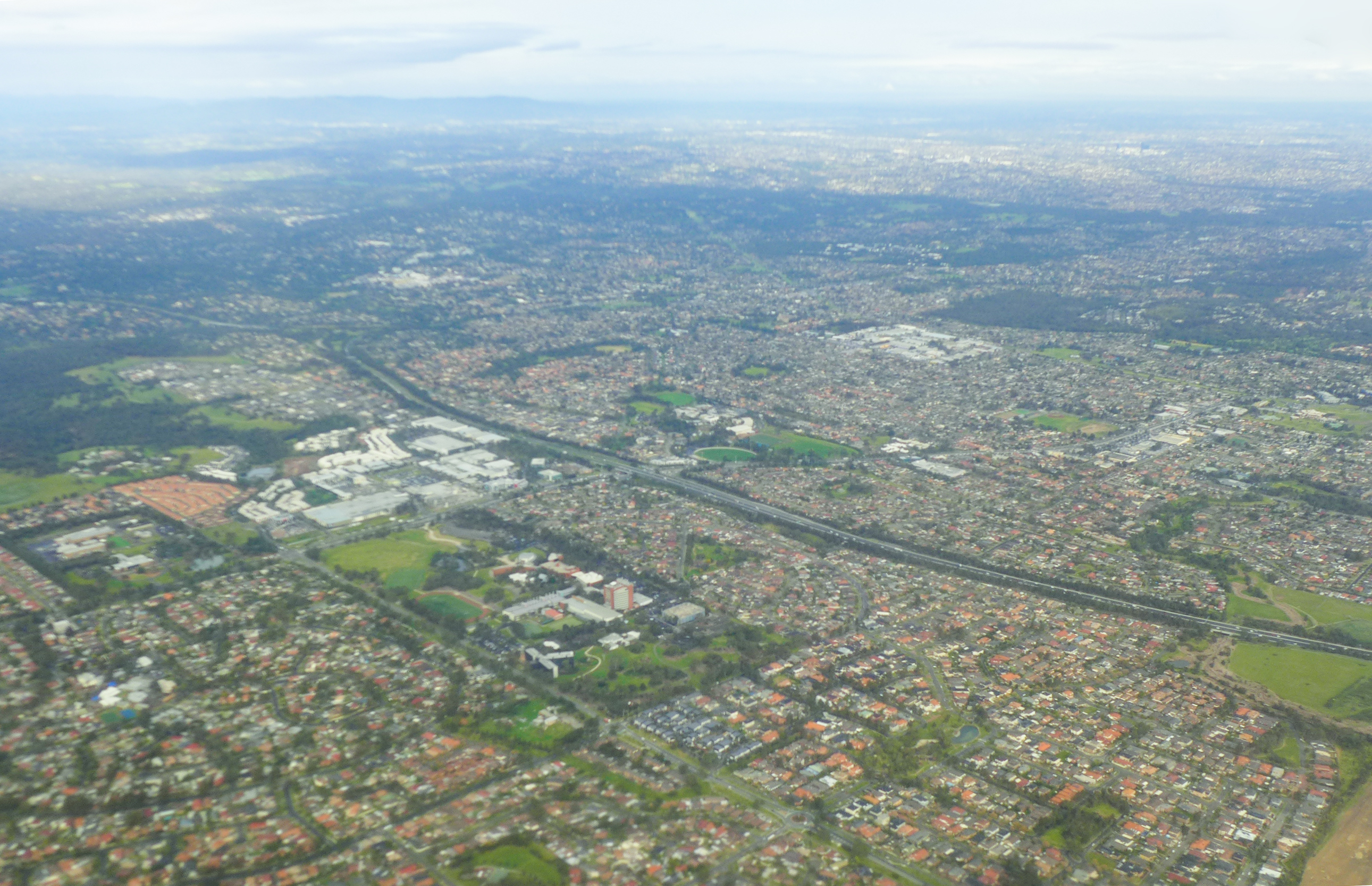
A birds-eye view of Bundoora, City of Whittlesea.

The traditional owners of the land now known as Bundoora were probably the Wurundjeri-willam clan. Bundoora was named after Keelbundoora, which was the name of the parish (land) where Bundoora exists today. Keelbundoora was also the name of the young boy present at the signing of the Batman treaty, a historic land agreement made by European settler, John Batman with the Aboriginal people of Melbourne in 1835. The treaty was later ruled invalid by the government of the day. Only a small part of Bundoora is within the City of Whittlesea boundary, the rest of the suburb is served by Darebin City Council and Banyule City Council.

=== Lalor ===
Lalor was established in 1947. Lalor was originally the home of a low-cost housing project that provided houses for ex-servicemen returning from World War II. The first primary school opened in 1954.

=== Thomastown ===
Legend has it that Thomastown was named after a local settler called Thomas who started a popular market garden in 1848. It was more than likely named after Thomastown in Ireland, a parish and market town in the County of Kilkenny, or a station on the Waterford to Kilkenny Junction railway. Thomastown East Primary school was opened in 1961.

=== Epping ===
Epping was named after the Epping Forest in Essex, England in 1853. The first hotel opened the same year. The first Catholic school was opened in 1844.

=== South Morang ===
South Morang is named after the Parish (or area) of Morang where the suburb exists today. The first primary school in South Morang was built in 1877 and the suburb has two major parks, Hawkstowe and Plenty Gorge Parklands. The Mernda railway line runs through the suburb, as in many other suburbs in the municipality.

=== Whittlesea ===
Whittlesea, as the township came to be called, was named after Whittlesey in England. Close to 1889 a railway from Whittlesea to Melbourne was established to transport goods produced in the region to Melbourne. Whittlesea station closed in 1959, with services ending at Lalor. The line has been progressively rebuilt and now ends at Mernda, opened in 2018.

=== Mill Park ===
Mill Park was named after Henry "Money" Miller who bred racehorses and conducted a range of dairy and grazing activities at his property named The Findon Hounds and the Findon Harriers Hunt Club until 1930. Residential development began in Mill Park in the 1970s.

=== Mernda ===
This area has grown from a population of 1316 in 2001 to 23,369 in 2021, and is anticipated to grow to around 40,000 people at full development. The name Mernda means "young girl" in the local Wurundjeri Aboriginal language. When Mernda was named in 1913 the township consisted of a school, a Methodist church, a store and a railway station. In the early 1900s there were many dairy farms in Mernda that supplied milk to Melbourne.

== Townships and localities ==
The 2021 census, the city had a population of 229,396 up from 197,491 in the 2016 census

Population
Locality	2016	2021
Beveridge^	2,330	4,642
Bundoora^	28,653	28,068
Donnybrook	169	2,100
Doreen^	21,298	27,122
Eden Park	1,204	1,194
Epping	32,395	33,489
Humevale	307	352
Kinglake West^	1,166	1,305
Lalor	22,594	23,219
Mernda	16,458	23,369
Mill Park	29,710	28,712
South Morang	24,060	24,989
Thomastown	20,523	20,234
Whittlesea	5,611	6,117
Wollert	9,060	24,407
Woodstock	150	150
Yan Yean^	252	246

^ - Territory divided with another LGA

== Population ==
Year	Population
1954	5,724
1958	8,350*
1961	11,490
1966	16,713
1971	30,327
1976	48,039
1981	65,657
1986	79,182
1991	95,672
1996	101,691
2001	113,784
2006	124,647
2011	154,880
2016	197,491
2021	229,396

== Previous mayors ==
There have been 23 mayors of Whittlesea since 1997. The mayor is elected yearly from amongst the elected Councillors to serve as leader of the council.
