= Eden Park, Victoria =

Eden Park
- Town
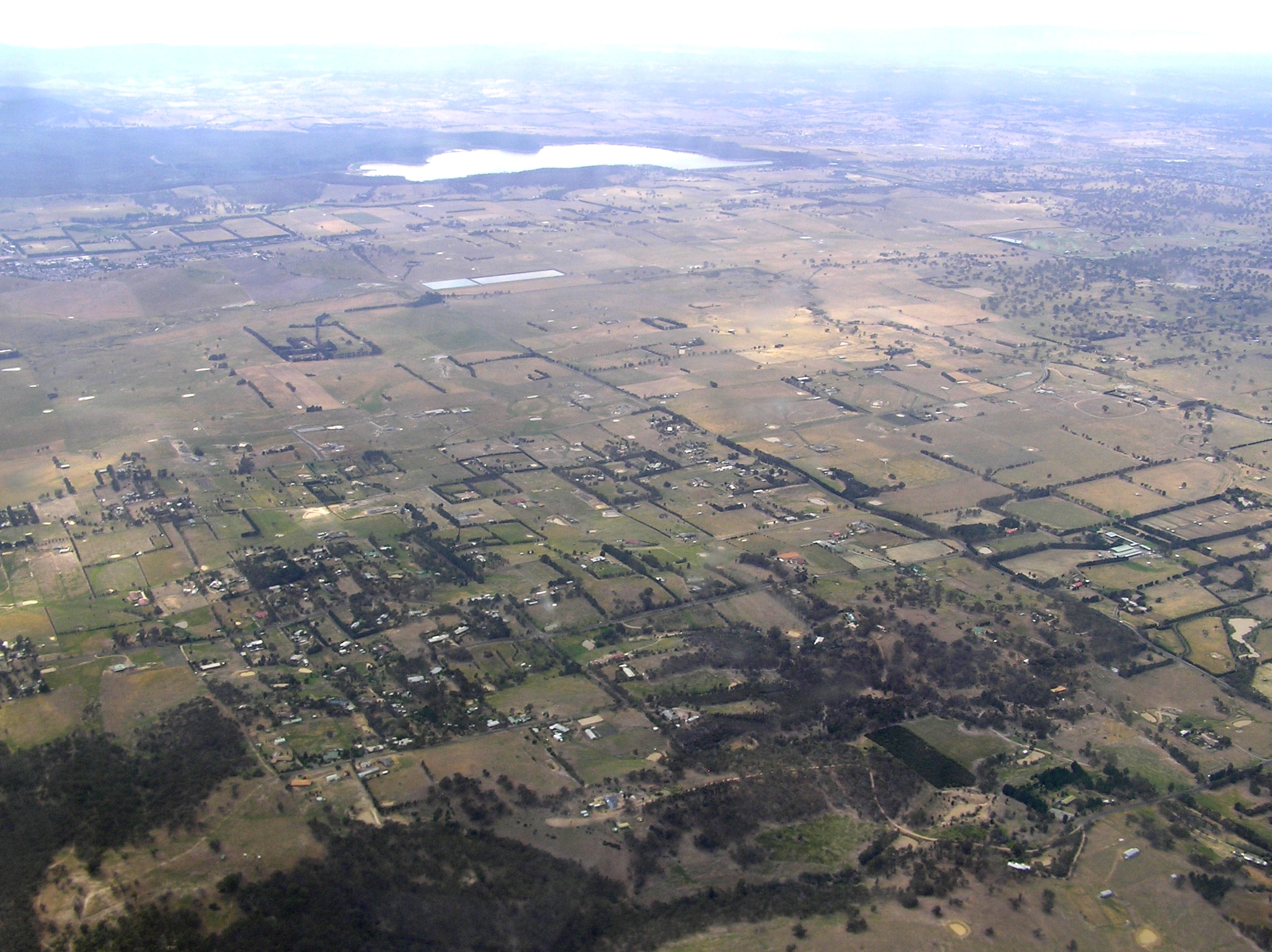
- Aerial view of Eden Park from the north-west

- Interactive map of Eden Park
- Coordinates: 37.489°S 145.070°E
- Country: Australia
- State: Victoria
- LGA: City of Whittlesea
- Location: 36 km (22 mi) NE of Melbourne; 4 km (2.5 mi) NW of Whittlesea

Government
  - State electorate: Yan Yean
  - Federal division: McEwen
- Elevation: 177 m (581 ft)

Population
  - Total: 1,194 (SAL 2021)
- Postcode: 3757
Localities around Eden Park
Upper Plenty	Upper Plenty	Whittlesea
Beveridge	Eden Park	Whittlesea
Woodstock	Woodstock	Yan Yean

Eden Park is a locality in Victoria, Australia, 36 km (22 mi) north-east of Melbourne's Central Business District, located within the City of Whittlesea local government area. Eden Park recorded a population of 1,194 at the 2021 census.

== History ==
Eden Park gets its name from an estate of the same name, which was sold by Ewen and Janet Robertson to an investor in 1888. Robertson originally acquired approximately 400ha in 1854 to build "Breadalbane", a twelve-roomed homestead. Much of the land is prone to erosion, which has limited development. Eden Park is an important part of Melbourne's Green Wedge.

A primary school in Eden Park existed from 1904 to 1942. Eden Park Post Office opened on 7 October 1905, and closed in 1971.

Melbourne Polytechnic has a training centre in Eden Park called Northern Lodge, which operates as a thoroughbred stud and vineyard for students undertaking equine studies, and courses in viticulture and winemaking. During 2011, there were community protests to stop the Eden Park Kangaroo Cull on the property.
