= Westfield Plenty Valley =

- Location: Mill Park, Victoria, Australia
- Coordinates: 37.6509368°S 145.0689697°E
- Opened: 2004-2005
- Owner: Dexus; Scentre Group
- Num. of stores: 182
- Num. of anchor tenants: 5
- Floor area: 62,942 m^{2} (677,500 sq ft)
- Floors: 2
- Parking: 2,650 spaces
- Website: www.westfield.com.au

Westfield Plenty Valley is a shopping centre in the suburb of Mill Park, Victoria, Australia. Until its expansion in 2008, it was known as Plenty Valley Town Centre and hosted one major store (Coles supermarket), and approximately 22 specialty stores.

Westfield began a re-development program for the centre in 2007, expanding the area to 62,942 square metres (677,500 sq ft), at a cost of approx $200 million. Westfield Plenty Valley has 18w stores, and is anchored by five major stores: Coles, Woolworths, Aldi, Target and Kmart. There are also 2,650 car spaces and a 600-seat food court. The centre opened on 22 May 2008.

== History ==
In 2004, a 50% shareholding was sold by Westfield to DB Real Estate.

=== Development ===
A new Myer department store was proposed but was abandoned by a company restructure.

On 2 February 2017, construction started on a Gold Class V/max Cinema complex and a line-up of new restaurants including Pancake Parlour and Grill'd as part of an $80 million redevelopment. The new complex had opened in March 2018.

== Tenants ==
Westfield Plenty Valley has five anchor tenants:

- Aldi
- Coles
- Kmart
- Target
- Woolworths

Other retailers in the centre include:

- Best & Less
- Chemist Warehouse
- JB Hi-Fi
- Priceline Pharmacy
- Rebel
- The Reject Shop
- Village Cinemas

== Transport links ==
South Morang railway station is adjacent to Westfield Plenty Valley and opened in April 2012.
