= Pacific Epping =

- Location: Epping, Victoria, Australia
- Coordinates: 37°39′07″S 145°01′23″E
- Opened: 29 October 1996; 30 years ago
- Owner: Queensland Investment Corporation
- Num. of stores: 213
- Num. of anchor tenants: 12
- Floor area: 74,036 m^{2} (796,920 sq ft)
- Floors: 2
- Parking: 3050 Aboveground car parks 950 underground car parks
- Website: www.pacificepping.com.au

Pacific Epping is a shopping centre in Epping, Victoria, a suburb of Melbourne, Australia. It opened in 1996. It is located on the corner of High Street and Cooper Street, 500 m (1,600 ft) away from Epping railway station, Melbourne, and approximately 20 km (12 mi) north of the Melbourne CBD. Until September 2013, the shopping centre was known as Epping Plaza. The centre is still sometimes referred to as Epping Plaza, including the Epping Plaza Hotel and the bus stops which are called Epping Plaza SC.

== History ==
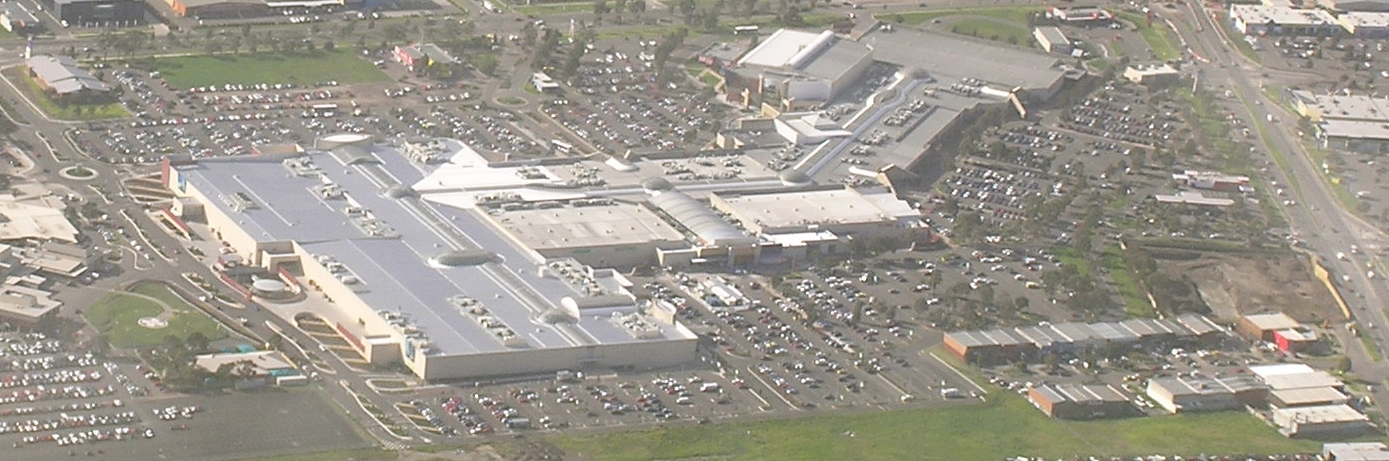
Pacific Epping prior to the construction of the Urban Diner.

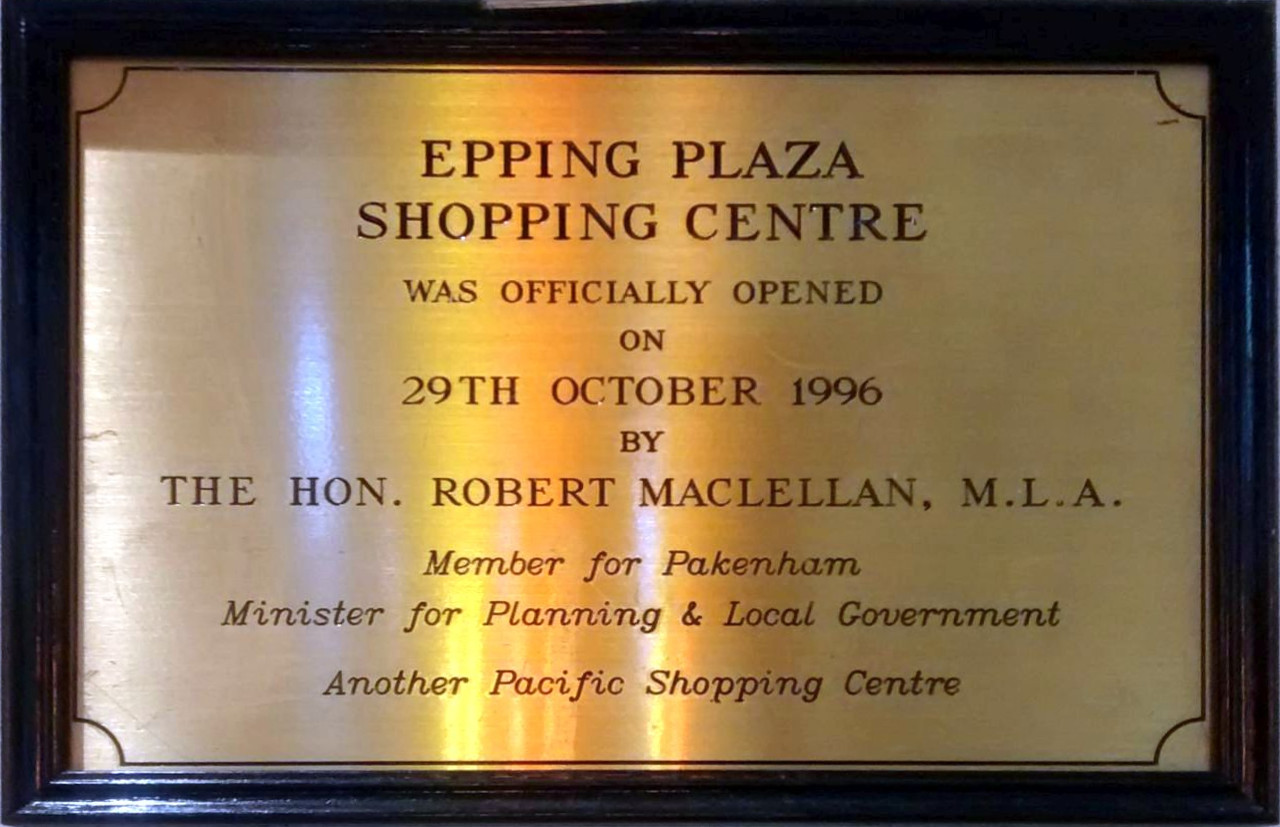
Official sign

Originally soft-opening in 1995 with only Target and Coles, and April 1996 with everything else, Epping Plaza Shopping Centre was officially opened on 29 October 1996 by The Hon. Robert Maclellan, M.L.A.

In November 1997, the dining and entertainment complex opened to the public, with a 10 auditorium Reading Cinemas complex (previously known as Epping 10 Cinema until Reading Cinemas' acquired Anderson Multiplex in 2004), Epping Plaza Hotel and indoor restaurants. However, TGI Fridays and La Familigia would not be added to this area until 2001.

In mid-2007, Epping Plaza underwent a major extension to the west of the existing plaza and the total number of stores grew to 218.

Further development in 2009 included the extension and refurbishment of the Fresh Food Hall, now named "Hunter & Gatherer". The area to the north of Hunter & Gatherer was also refurbished.

Between December 2012 and January 2013, construction commenced on the renovation of the dining and entertainment complex, later known by the time of its completion of the Urban Dining in October 2013, resulting in the removal of the indoor dining area which originally doubled as a shortcut to Reading Cinemas. Stage 5 added 11 restaurants and cafés in a street-style setting on the Cooper Street side of Epping Plaza, in addition to a renovation of Reading Cinemas and many of the surrounding dining and entertainment venues nearby, where Reading Cinemas built two extra auditoriums for Gold Lounge and rebuilt the front side of the interior, as well as a complete rebuild of the exterior itself. The completion of Stage 5 rebranded the shopping centre to Pacific Epping.

in June 2018 QIC assumed Management rights and 50% ownership of the centre.

Quest Apartment Hotels announced in January 2017 that it would build a 96-room hotel that would include an additional 1300sqm of new restaurants at Pacific Epping after securing a lease. Production has completed in late 2018, opening new dining and entertainment complexes to go along with it, further expanding the Urban Diner section.

In 2019, a 2-story childcare centre and gym were built near JB-Hi-Fi and ALDI.

Target closed its store in the centre in early 2021 and was replaced by Kmart.

In November 2023, the Hunter and Gatherer fresh food precinct closed to undergo further redevelopment; it reopened in December 2024, consisting of over 20 shops and a completely renovated Woolworths supermarket.

== Tenants ==
Major retailers in Pacific Epping include:

- Coles - supermarket
- Woolworths - supermarket
- Aldi - supermarket
- Big W - discount department store
- Kmart - discount department store
- Harris Scarfe - department store
- JB Hi-Fi - consumer goods
- Best & Less - apparel
- Cotton On Mega - apparel
- Reading Cinemas - movie theatres.

== Incidents ==
On 3 October 2006, a small fire broke out in cinema six of Reading cinemas forcing the evacuation 40 people. Water from fire sprinklers trigged by the blaze also caused damage to the Harris Scarfe department store located below the cinema. Police believe the blaze was deliberately lit.

On 3 December 2008, shoppers and staff at the shopping centre were evacuated after a wall fell five metres inside Big W's garden centre. Police initially feared Big W's northern wall, which was attached to the fallen one, could also collapse, adding "It was an absolute miracle no one died." The collapse caused Big W, surrounding stores and part of the underground car park to be evacuated and the Big W entrance to the centre to be closed off. It is thought that a burst pipe may have caused the collapse. No one was injured. Police praised the actions of the staff of Big W Epping and Epping Plaza.

One of the first cases of swine flu in Australia unconnected with foreign travel was detected at Epping Plaza. A staff member at McDonald's was diagnosed with swine flu virus, and the McDonald's branch was immediately closed.

On 21 June 2024, a gun was fired outside Pacific Epping. Two males, aged 16 and 22, self-reported to hospital due to injuries sustained from the incident.

== See also ==
- List of shopping centres in Australia
