= Wollert, Victoria =

Wollert
- Suburb
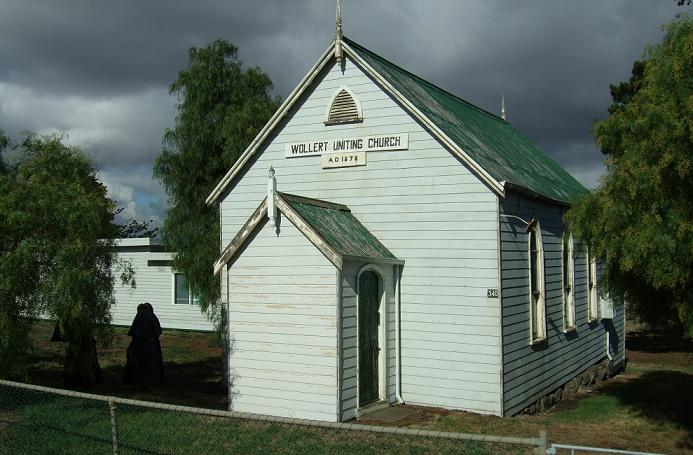
- Uniting church

- Interactive map of Wollert
- Coordinates: 37.597°S 145.033°E
- Country: Australia
- State: Victoria
- City: Melbourne
- LGA: City of Whittlesea
- Location: 27 km (17 mi) N of Melbourne; 6 km (3.7 mi) N of Epping

Government
  - State electorates: Thomastown; Mill Park; Yan Yean
  - Federal division: Scullin
- Elevation: 100 m (330 ft)

Population
  - Total: 24,407 (2021 census)
- Postcode: 3750
Suburbs around Wollert
Craigieburn	Donnybrook	Woodstock
Craigieburn	Wollert	Mernda
Epping	Epping	South Morang

Wollert (/ˈwɒlərt/ WOL-ərt) is a suburb of Melbourne, Victoria, Australia, 26 km north of Melbourne's central business district, located within the City of Whittlesea local government area. Wollert recorded a population of 24,407 at the 2021 census.

== History ==
=== Etymology ===
"Wollert" is a Woiwurrung word meaning "where possums abound", and the suburb takes its name from the land parish in which part of it is situated.

=== 19th century ===
From 1836 until the early 1850s, sheep raising was the main activity. Summerhill farm on Summerhill Road was built by Thomas Wilson, in the 1850s. He ran a dairy, pig and sheep farm. When he sold the property in 1886 it was regarded as one of the finest farming properties in Victoria at the time.

A bluestone house and outbuildings, a bluestone quarry and dry stone wall in Bindts Road, Wollert are considered of high local significance. Hehr's Pine Park Farm complex in Epping Road illustrates early German building practices the manner of which the resources of the land were put to use and the dairy and horse breeding industries.

In 1853, much of the land was subdivided into smaller farm lots, and necessary access roads laid out. During this period Wollert became a dairying community, with significant dairy production continuing for the Melbourne market until the 1960s. In more recent years, dairying has largely ceased and smaller-scale grazing and Wollert's quarrying and brickmaking facilities represent the suburb's main industries.

The first school, established by the Church of England, commenced in 1852. A bluestone Government school replaced it in 1877 and continued until 1994. The Wollert General Store is still in operation, but the adjacent Dance Palais is no longer is use. Wollert Post Office opened on 1 September 1876, closed in 1895, then reopened in 1902.

A Methodist Church was built in 1878 to replace an earlier one built in 1859. This church continued as the Wollert Uniting Church but later closed. The building has historic and social value for the City of Whittlesea. Its architecture expresses key characteristics of the Carpenter Gothic style, including timber cladding and lancet windows. In May 2022 Major Road Projects Victoria announced that they will be relocating and restoring the church as part of the Epping Road Upgrade. In April 2023 it was relocated to Carome Homestead in Mernda.

=== 20th century ===
During the late 1940s, several large Wollert properties were purchased by the Soldier Settlement. They were then subdivided and allocated to eligible ex-servicemen.

=== 21st century ===
During the early 2000's, Wollert began to sub-urbanise and experienced a surge in demographics. It was considered part of the list of 'Areas with the largest growth'

== Facilities ==
The Kirrip Hub Click & Collect Service with regular storytime sessions is managed by Yarra Plenty Regional Library. Their mobile library also stops weekly in Wollert.

== Economy ==
Australia's largest brickmaker, Brickworks Limited, operates a plant in Wollert.

== Education ==
There are five primary schools in Wollert:

- Wollert Primary School (opened 2022)
- Edgars Creek Primary School (opened 2021)
- Barrawang Primary School (opened 2023)
- Wirrigirri Primary School (opened 2025)
- Carlo Acutis Roman Catholic Primary School (opened 2025)

There are two secondary schools in Wollert:

- Edgars Creek Secondary College (established 2018)
- Wollert Secondary College (established 2023)

== Notable people ==
- Trent Cotchin – AFL footballer Cotchin Close named after him
