= St Helena, Victoria =

St Helena
- Suburb
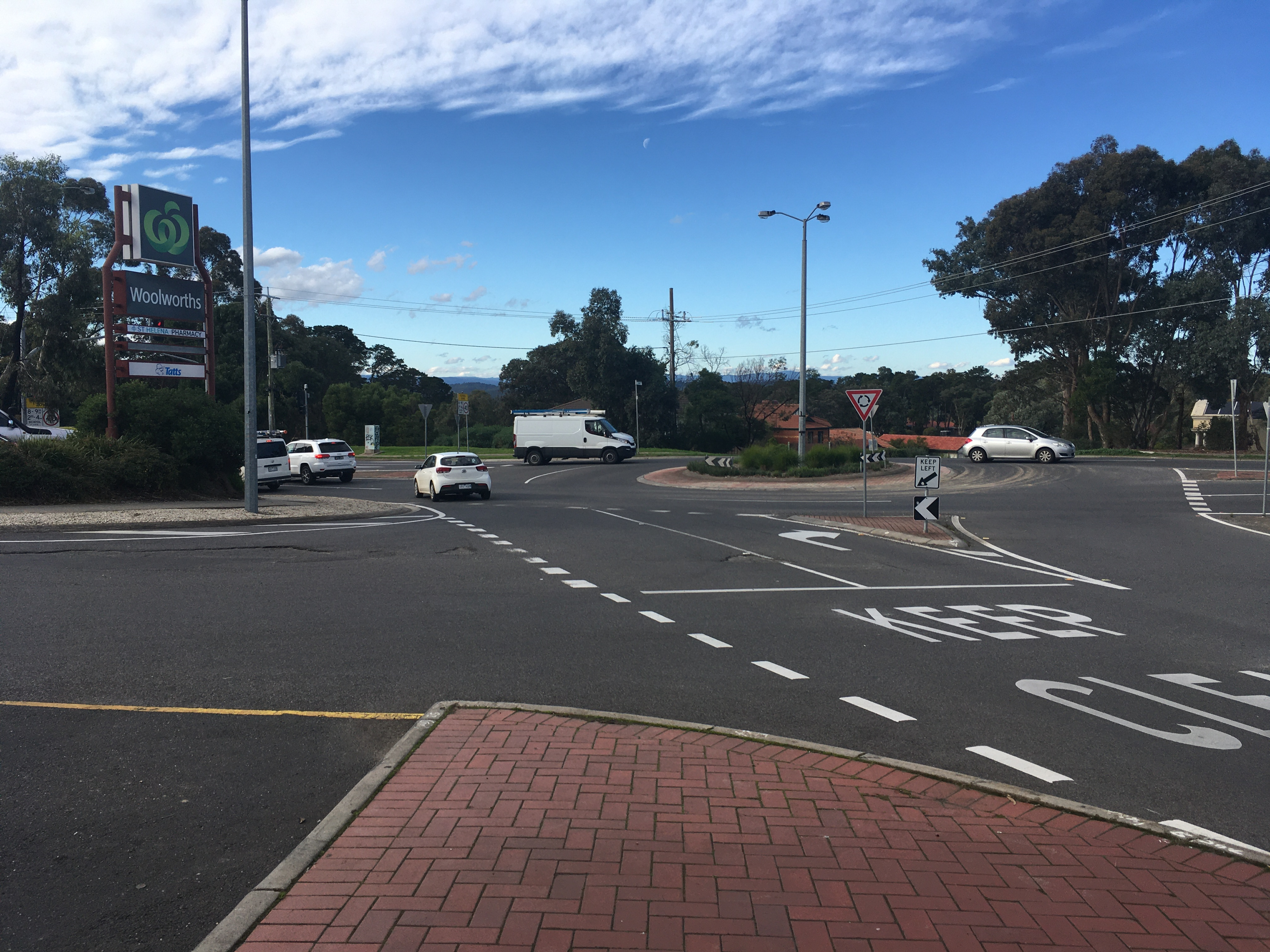
- Roundabout on Aqueduct Road, St Helena

- Interactive map of St Helena
- Coordinates: 37.686°S 145.137°E
- Country: Australia
- State: Victoria
- City: Melbourne
- LGA: City of Banyule
- Location: 21 km (13 mi) from Melbourne

Government
  - State electorate: Eltham
  - Federal division: Jagajaga

Area
  - Total: 1.8 km^{2} (0.69 sq mi)

Population
  - Total: 2,890 (2021 census)
  - Density: 1,610/km^{2} (4,160/sq mi)
- Postcode: 3088
Suburbs around St Helena
	Diamond Creek	Diamond Creek
Greensborough	St Helena	Eltham North
	Briar Hill	Eltham

St Helena (/həˈliːnə/ hə-LEE-nə) is a suburb of Melbourne, Victoria, Australia, 21 km north-east from Melbourne's Central Business District, located within the City of Banyule local government area. St Helena recorded a population of 2,890 at the 2021 census.

== History ==
St Helena was settled by Anthony Beale, who had previously lived on the island of Saint Helena in the Atlantic Ocean, working as the paymaster for the British East India Company. When St Helena reverted to British Government control in 1836, Beale retired and moved to England for three years with his wife and sixteen children. In the 1830s, he travelled to the Port Phillip district of New South Wales, travelling via Van Dieman's Land, where his son Onesophorous drowned in the Tamar River. In 1841, Beale took up a large pastoral lease on the Plenty River, including the area that is now known as St Helena. The Beales' cottage was called St Helena, after which the area become known.

After the death of Anthony Beales's wife, Katherine Rose, Beale built the Rose Chapel in their front garden in memory of her. Anthony and Katherine Beale, along with some of their children, are among those buried in the adjoining graveyard. The chapel and three acres of land were given to the Church of England, and it was consecrated as St Katherine's Church by the Bishop of Ballarat in 1842. Although it was burned by a bushfire in 1957, architectural drawings of it had recently been made, and the chapel was rebuilt. It is still in use today.

Major residential development began during the mid to late 1980s.

== Amenities ==
St Helena Marketplace is a shopping centre consisting of a Woolworths supermarket and smaller retailers such as Bakers Delight, pharmacy, and fast food eateries. At the same location is Myhealth St Helena.

Schools within St Helena are St Helena Secondary College, Glen Katherine Primary School, Holy Trinity Primary School and Plenty Valley International Montessori School.

There are a few medical clinics in St Helena and a Veterinary clinic.

Public library service is provided by Yarra Plenty Regional Library. The nearest library is Diamond Valley Library, Greensborough.

== Government areas ==
- Local government: Beale Ward in the City of Nillumbik.
- Victorian State electorate: Eltham, represented by Vicki Ward MP.
- Federal electorate: Jagajaga, represented by Kate Thwaites MP.

== Sport ==
St Helena is represented in basketball by the St Helena Saints Basketball Club, who play in the Diamond Valley Basketball Association. The club trains at St Helena Secondary basketball stadium. There are no other sporting teams that represent St Helena. However, Anthony Beale Reserve, which is in St Helena, is the home ground of the Greensborough Junior Football Club.

== See also ==
- Shire of Diamond Valley – St Helena was previously within this former local government area.
