= Greensborough railway station =

Railway station in Melbourne, Australia

Greensborough
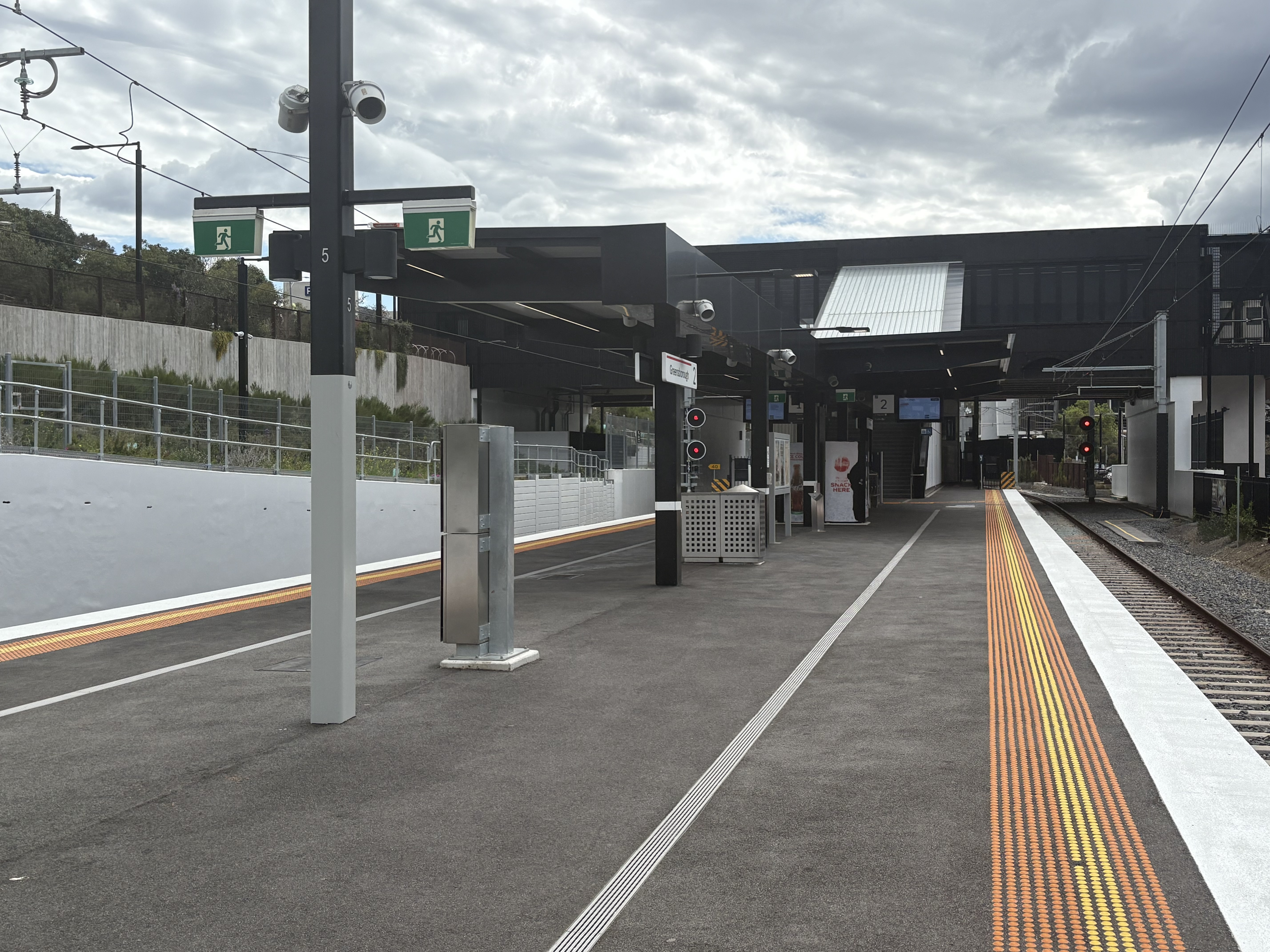
- North-west bound view from Platform 2, September 2025

General information
- Location: Para Road, Greensborough, Victoria 3088; City of Banyule; Australia
- Coordinates: 37°42′14″S 145°06′29″E
- System: PTV commuter rail station
- Owner: VicTrack
- Operator: Metro Trains
- Line: Hurstbridge
- Distance: 22.93 kilometres from Southern Cross
- Platforms: 2 (1 island)
- Tracks: 2
- Connections: Bus

Construction
- Structure type: Ground
- Parking: 212
- Cycle facilities: Yes
- Accessible: Yes—step free access

Other information
- Status: Operational, premium station
- Station code: GRN
- Fare zone: Myki zone 2
- Website: Public Transport Victoria

History
- Opened: 5 June 1902; 124 years ago
- Rebuilt: 3 April 1970; 30 April 2023
- Electrified: April 1923 (1500 V DC overhead)

Passengers
- 2005–2006: 741,508
- 2006–2007: 765,488 ▲3.23%
- 2007–2008: 841,846 ▲9.97%
- 2008–2009: 894,360 ▲6.23%
- 2009–2010: 913,732 ▲2.16%
- 2010–2011: 967,367 ▲5.86%
- 2011–2012: 946,150 ▼2.19%
- 2012–2013: Not measured
- 2013–2014: 762,576 ▼19.4%
- 2014–2015: 745,322 ▼2.26%
- 2015–2016: 815,378 ▲9.39%
- 2016–2017: 791,075 ▼2.98%
- 2017–2018: 685,654 ▼13.32%
- 2018–2019: 728,873 ▲6.3%
- 2019–2020: 588,050 ▼19.32%
- 2020–2021: 254,900 ▼56.65%
- 2021–2022: 266,050 ▲4.37%
- 2022–2023: 319,400 ▲20.05%
- 2023–2024: 411,400 ▲28.8%
- 2024–2025: 378,250 ▼8.06%

Services
Preceding station	Metro Trains	Following station
Watsonia towards Flinders Street	Hurstbridge line	Montmorency towards Hurstbridge
Watsonia towards Flinders Street	Hurstbridge line	Terminus
Track layout
Location

Greensborough station is a railway station operated by Metro Trains Melbourne on the Hurstbridge line, part of the Melbourne rail network. It serves the north-eastern suburb of Greensborough, in Melbourne, Victoria, Australia. Greensborough station is a ground level premium station, featuring an island platform. It opened on 5 June 1902, with the current station provided in April 2023.

Because of the curvature of the line, north-bound (Hurstbridge) services head south-east upon departing the station and, likewise, south-bound (Flinders Street) services head north-west. A number of peak-hour services to and from Flinders Street terminate at Greensborough.

== History ==
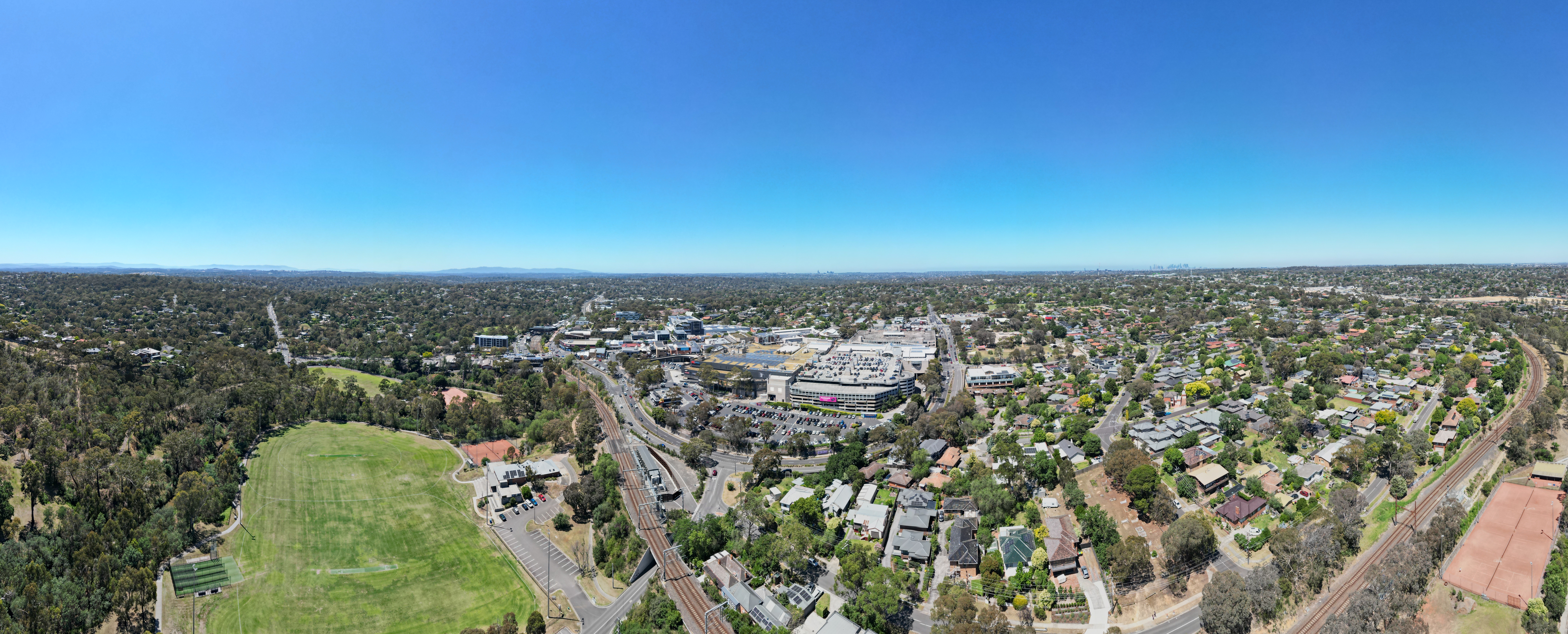
Greensborough, its shopping centre, railway line and surrounds aerial panorama

Greensborough station was a single-track, single platform station built in 1902, for service to (at the time) the outer north eastern suburb of Greensborough. At the time of construction, it was serviced by steam engines inbound and outbound from the Melbourne CBD, until the completion of the electrification from Heidelberg to Eltham in 1923.

The original platform was located on the south-western side of the station, where the current car-parking is located. The original track ran through the current island platform.

Due to the restrictions of only having one track out to Hurstbridge and only one through track, the trains were timetabled to arrive 3–4 minutes apart. The Hurstbridge service would collect passengers from the platform, then shunt out to a junction at the up end of the station, pull into a side track and wait 1–2 minutes for the Flinders Street service to arrive then depart, then continuing to Hurstbridge. Due to a much higher passenger count going to the city at the time, the Flinders Street service was given priority over the low passenger count toward Hurstbridge.

In the late 1960s and early 1970s, the station was upgraded to two tracks, and a single offset island platform was built. The station had a platform on the left and right, one for each direction. In 1969, the rebuilt station was provided and, on 3 April 1970, it officially opened. In 1977, a goods yard that existed at the station was closed to traffic. In 1979, the railway line between Greensborough and Macleod was duplicated.

On 21 June 1996, Greensborough was upgraded to a premium station.

On 15 May 2019, the Victorian State Government announced a plan to duplicate the line between Greensborough and Eltham, which included an upgrading of the station. The upgrade involved the building of an overpass and concourse, rebuilt station platforms and better accessibility in and around the station precinct. On 9 February 2021, final designs of the new station were released, and in mid-2021, early works on the project commenced. In 2022, the old station closed and was demolished to allow for major construction on the project, and the rebuilt station officially opened on 30 April 2023.

Until 2023, the timetabling for services to and from the station remained practically the same, due to the single-track railway between Greensborough and Hurstbridge, with only crossing loops located at Eltham and Diamond Creek. An Eltham/Hurstbridge service arrived approximately one minute before the Flinders Street service arrived, with both services departing at same time, allowing the outbound service clear passage to Eltham.

== Platforms and services ==
Greensborough has one island platform with two faces. It is serviced by Metro Trains' Hurstbridge line services. During peak hours, many trains terminate at Greensborough, and the track layout allows trains from either direction to run through either platform if required, meaning other services can still run through if a terminating train is occupying one of the platforms. However, the normal practice is that trains heading towards Flinders Street use platform 1, and trains heading towards Hurstbridge use platform 2 but during the peak hours trains to Hurstbridge use platform 1 alongside Flinders Street services that use both of the platforms and sometimes during disruptions they can use any platform because of the crossovers

Greensborough platform arrangement
Platform	Line	Destination	Service Type	Notes	Source
1	Hurstbridge line	Flinders Street	All stations and limited express services		
1	Hurstbridge line	Eltham, Hurstbridge	All stations	Peak hours only and during disruptions	
2	Hurstbridge line	Eltham, Hurstbridge	All stations		
2	Hurstbridge line	Flinders Street	All stations and limited express services	Peak hours only and during disruptions	

== Transport links ==
Kinetic Melbourne operates eight routes via Greensborough station, under contract to Transport Victoria:

- 385 : Whittlesea – Greensborough Plaza
- 514 : Eltham station – Glenroy station
- 517 : Northland Shopping Centre – St Helena
- 518 : Greensborough Plaza – St Helena West
- 566 : Lalor – Northland Shopping Centre
- 293 : Box Hill station – Greensborough
- SmartBus 901 : Frankston station – Melbourne Airport
- SmartBus 902 : Chelsea station – Westfield Airport West

Panorama Coaches operates one route to and from Greensborough station, under contract to Transport Victoria:

- 343 : to Hurstbridge station

== Gallery ==
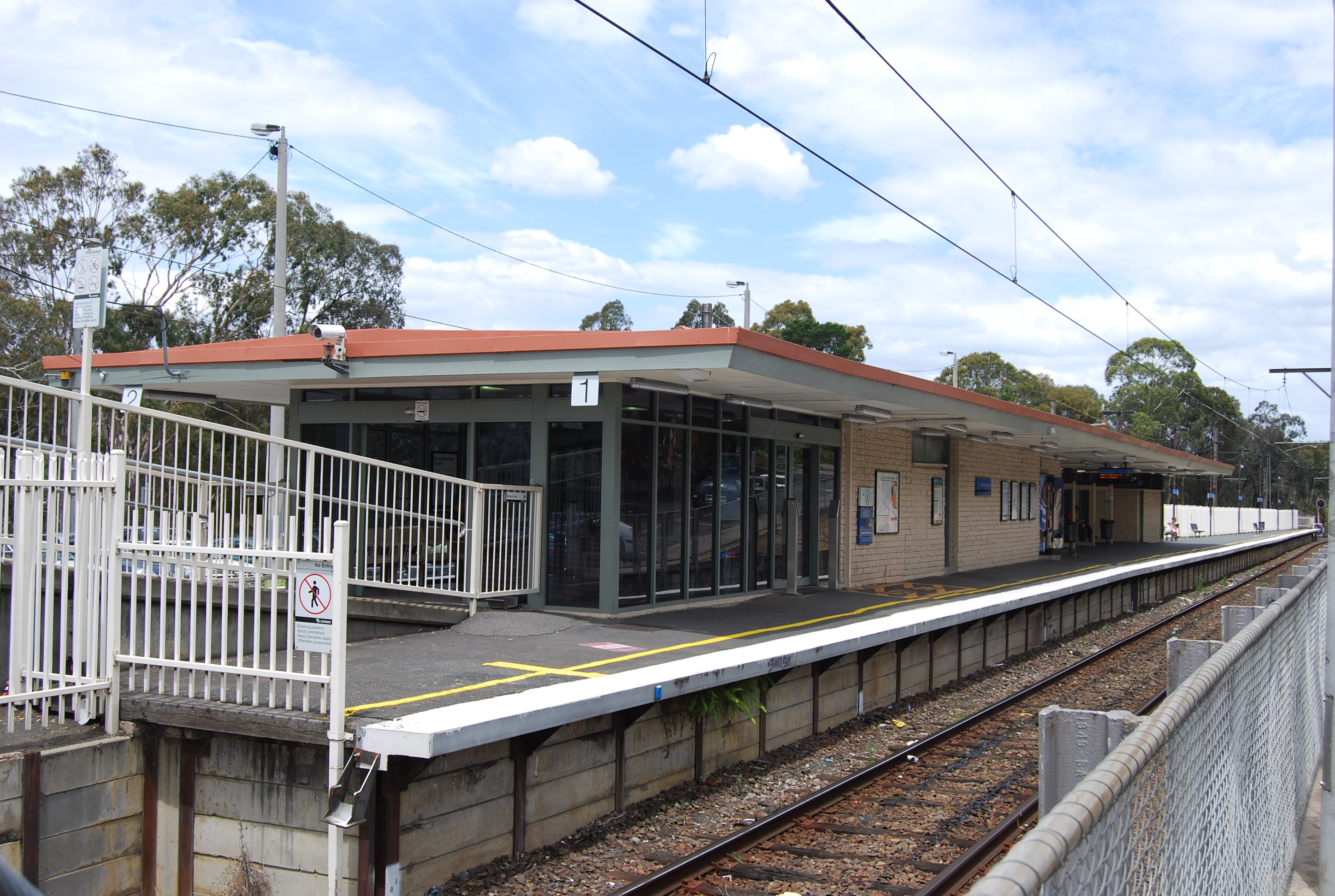
Southbound view of Platform 1 and station building, December 2008

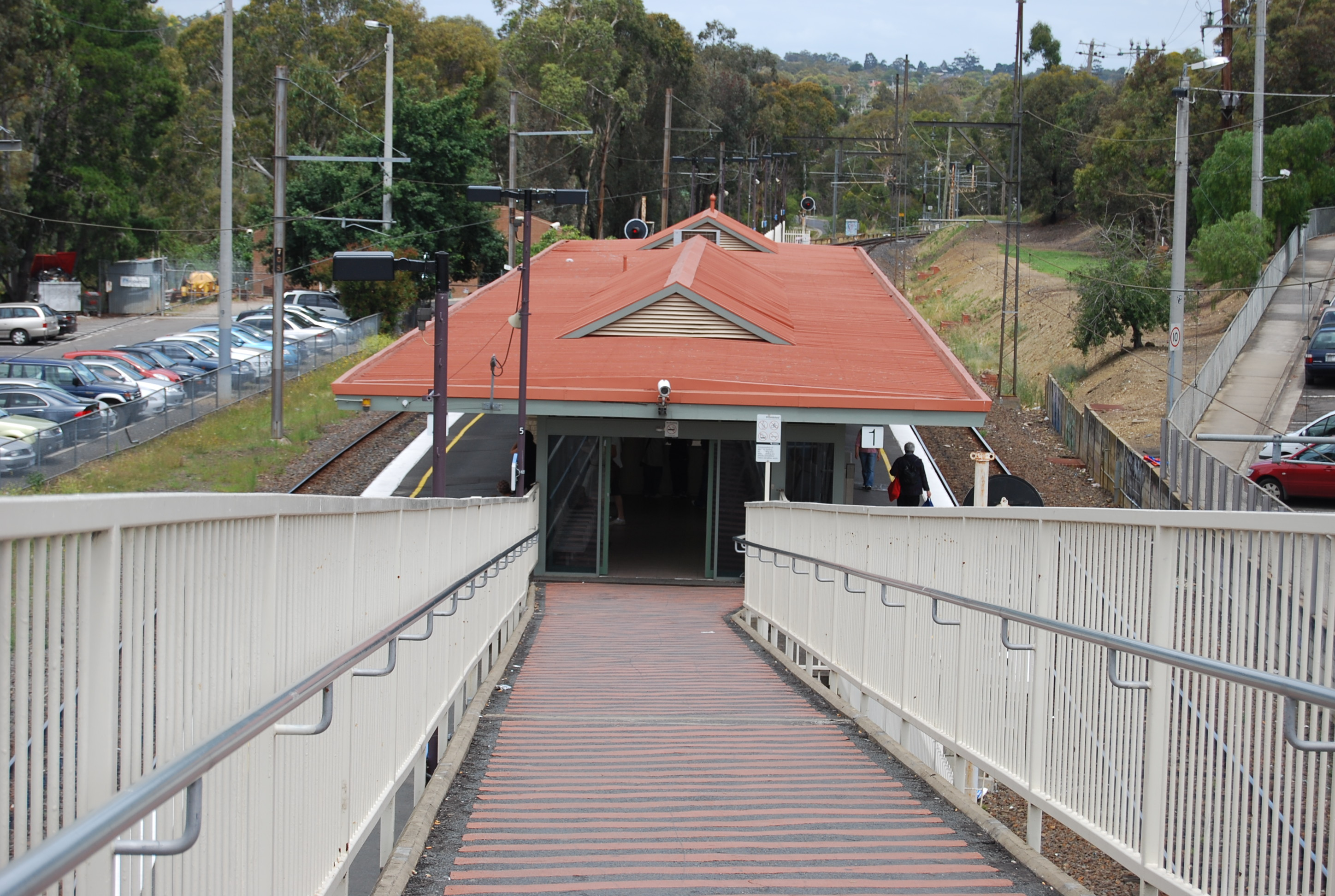
Station building and entrance, December 2008

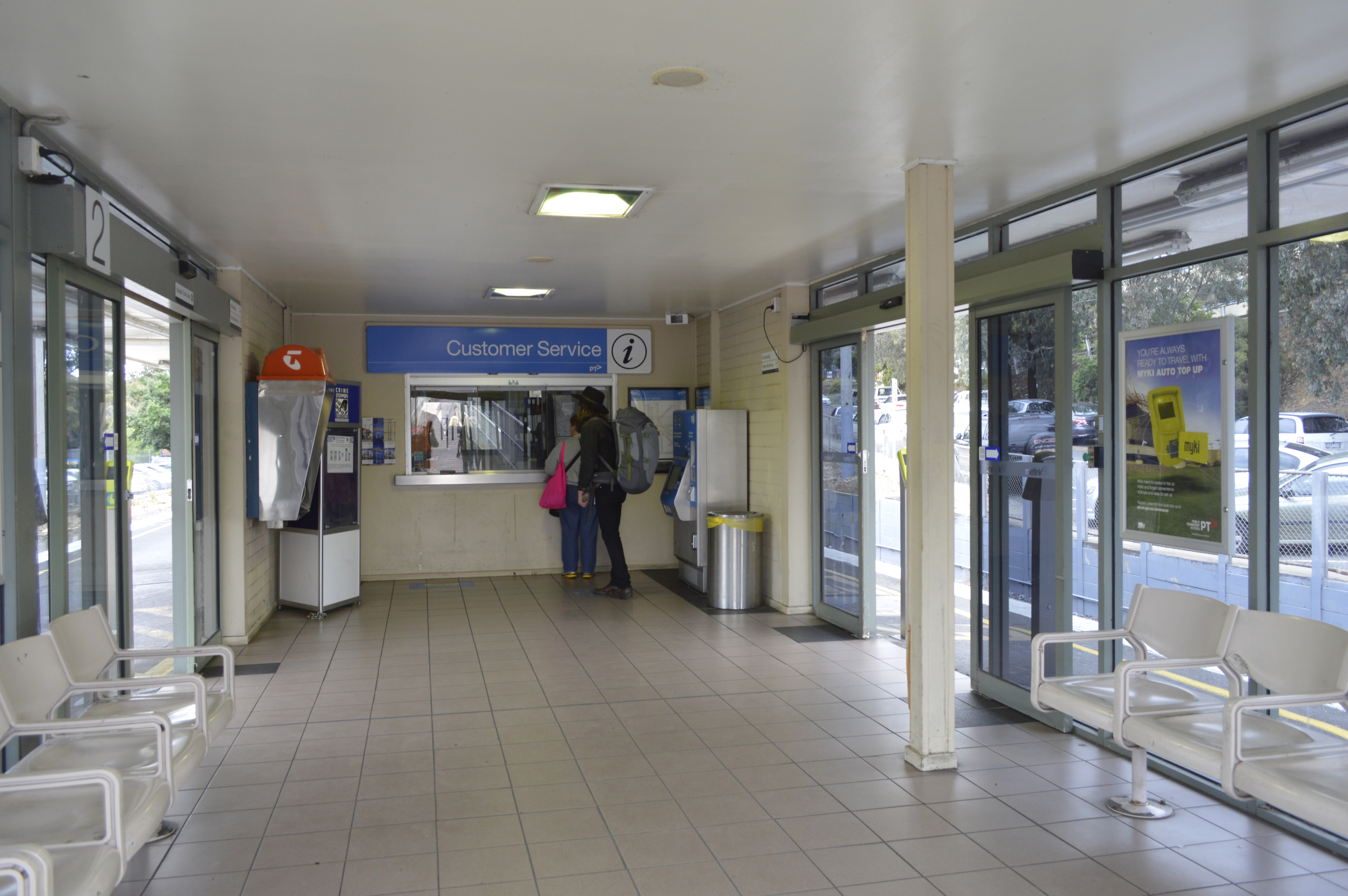
Enclosed waiting room, November 2013

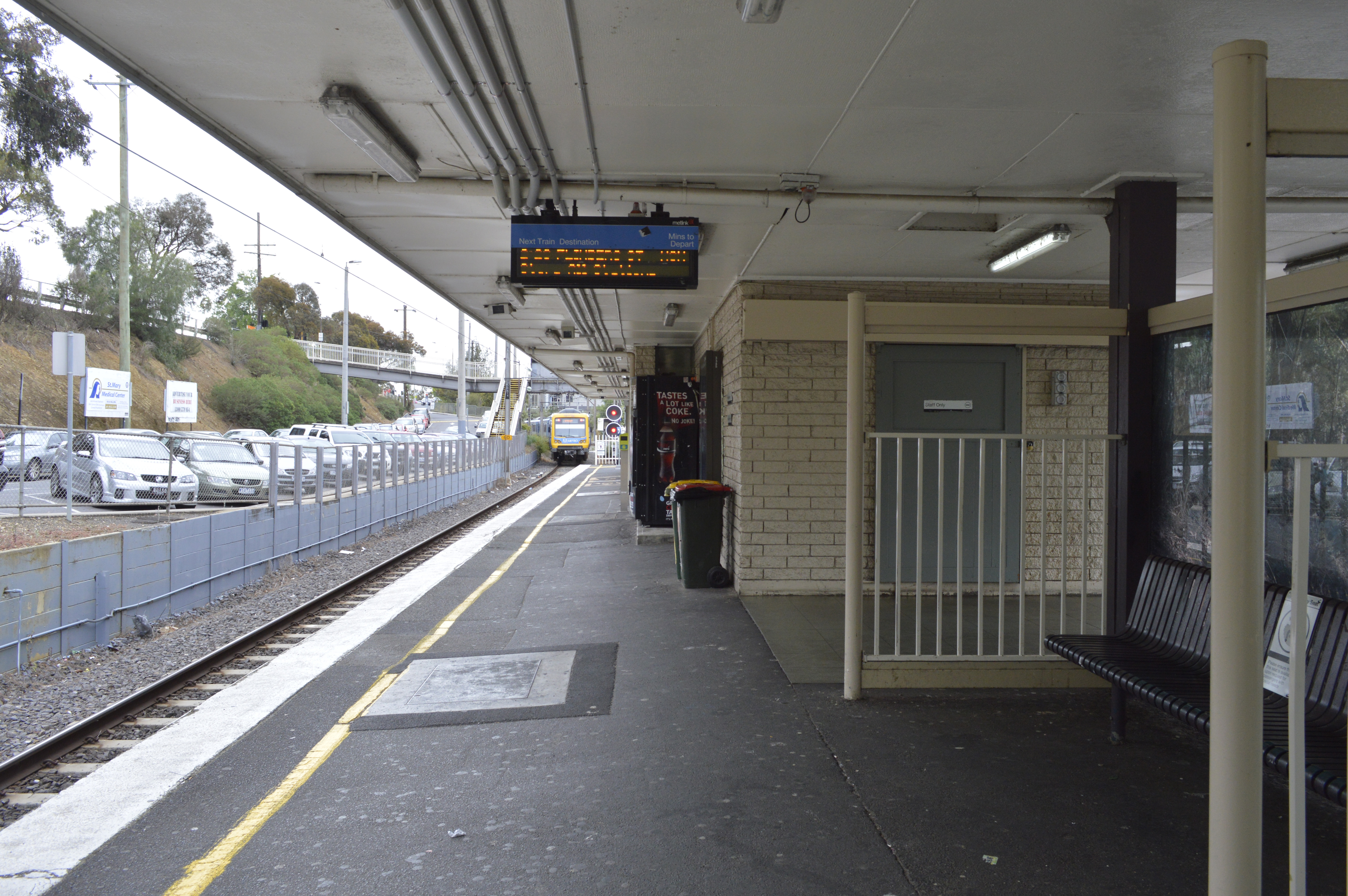
Northbound view from Platform 2,
November 2013

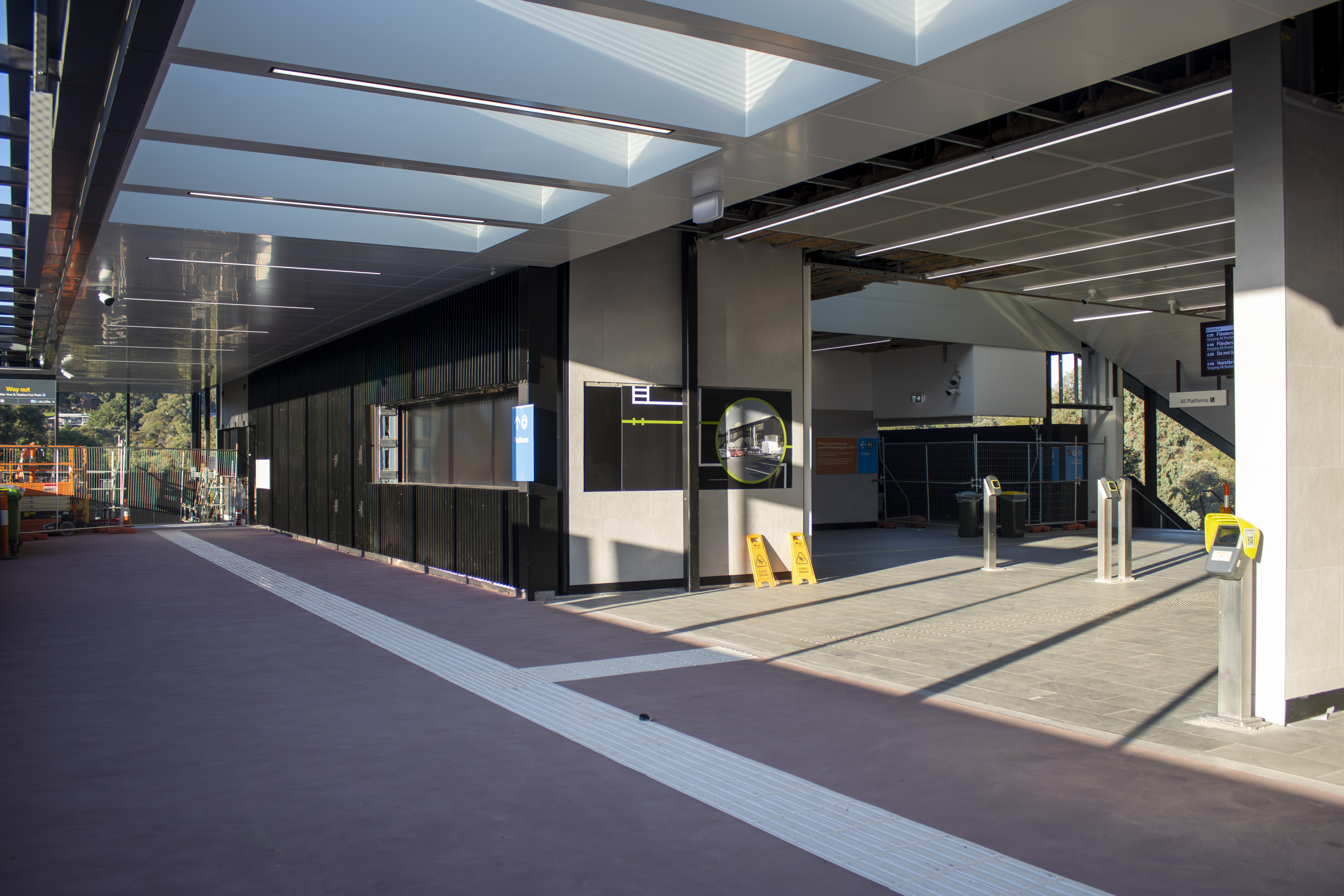
Station concourse and entrance, May 2023

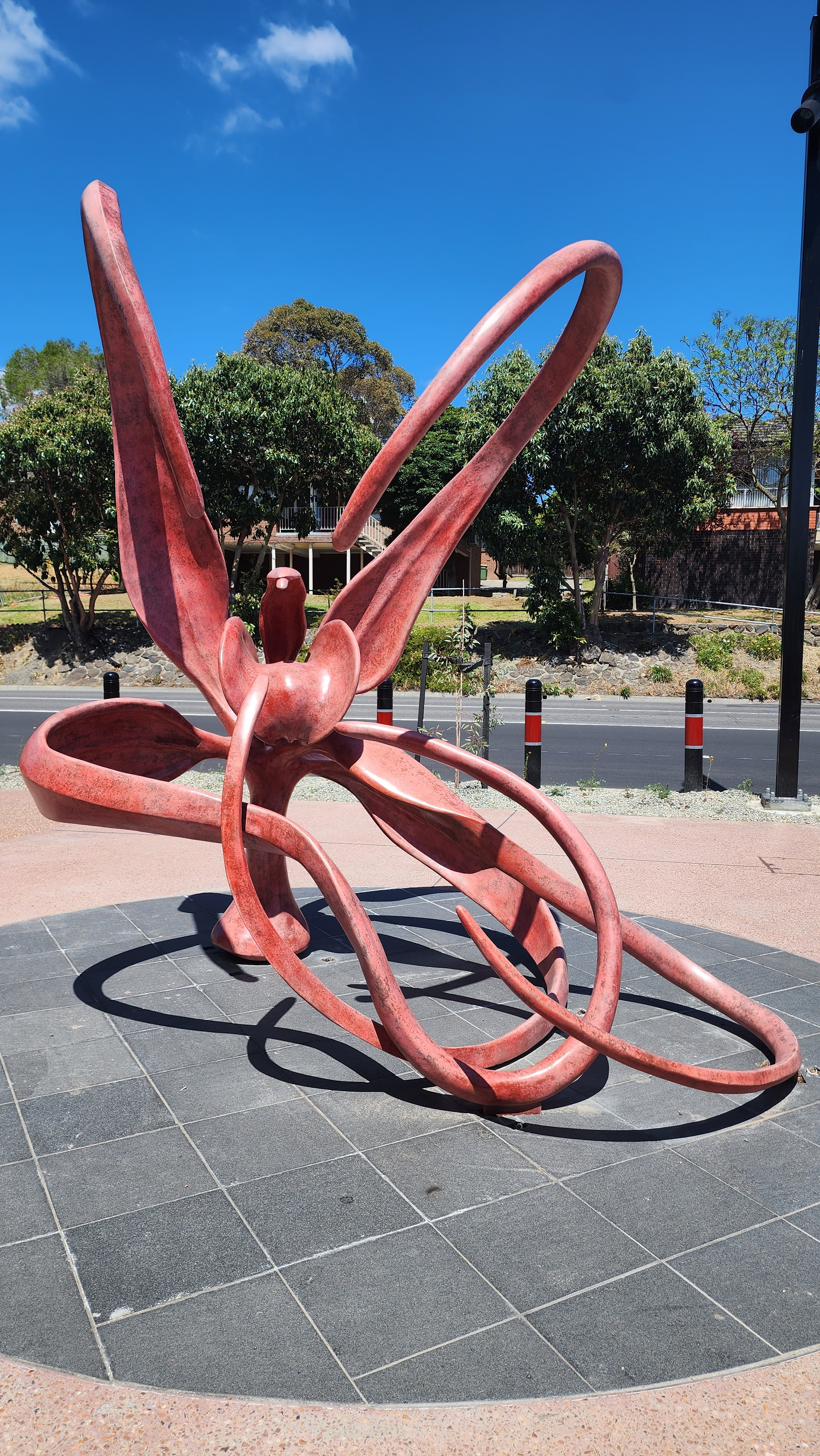
Orchid by Robyn Latham
