= Eltham North =

- Suburb
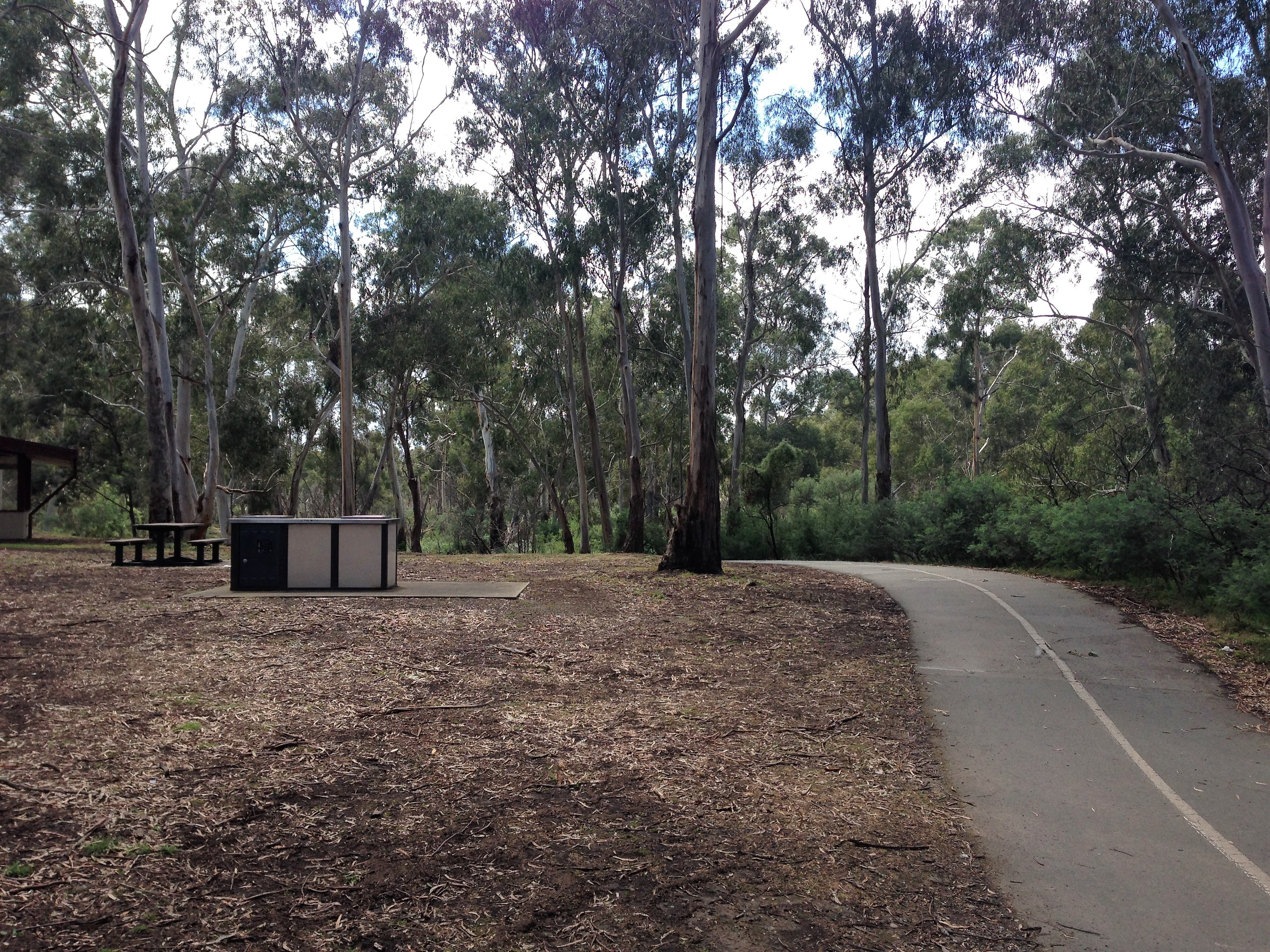
- Diamond Creek Trail, Eltham North

- Interactive map of Eltham North
- Coordinates: 37.698°S 145.144°E
- Country: Australia
- State: Victoria
- City: Melbourne
- LGAs: City of Banyule; Shire of Nillumbik
- Location: 21 km (13 mi) from Melbourne

Government
  - State electorate: Eltham
  - Federal division: Jagajaga

Population
  - Total: 6,830 (2021 census)
- Postcode: 3095
Suburbs around Eltham North
St Helena	Diamond Creek	Kangaroo Ground
Greensborough	Eltham North	Research
Briar Hill	Eltham	Research

Eltham North is a suburb of Melbourne, Australia. The suburb sits 21 km north-east of Melbourne's Central Business District, located within the City of Banyule and Shire of Nillumbik local government areas. Eltham North recorded a population of 6,830 at the 2021 census.

Originally an outlying rural part of Eltham, it became a separate locality with the opening of the Eltham North Primary School in 1925. At that time the locality was known as Glen Park, and the name was recorded in street directories until the 1960s. Nevertheless, the postal district was Eltham North.

Diamond Creek separates Eltham North from Eltham on its eastern edge. Eltham North shares the same postcode as Eltham (3095).

== History ==
Eltham North Post Office opened around 1934 and closed in 1966.

The graveyard was founded by Glen and Katherine for whom which the local Glen Katherine Primary school is named.

Eltham North, once known as Northern Eltham, was renamed in 1934 to Eltham North by the Mayor at the time.

== Facilities ==
Eltham North is part of Melbourne's "green wedge" and has numerous bushland reserves and playgrounds. The suburb is home to the Eltham North Adventure Playground, a substantial play area which was destroyed by fire in late 2017 and subsequently rebuilt. In May 2020 the Victorian State Government announced that a new off-lead park will be established in Eltham North.

The State primary school (Eltham North Primary School) is in the east of the suburb on Wattletree Rd. There is a kindergarten in Glen Park Road. Other schools within Eltham North include Glen Katherine Primary School, St Helena Secondary College and Holy Trinity Catholic Primary School.

The suburb is home to the North Eltham Wanderers Cricket Club, the Eltham Redbacks Football Club, and the Eltham North Jets Basketball Club.

Public Library facilities are provided by Yarra Plenty Regional Library. The nearest libraries are the Diamond Valley Library in Greensborough and the Eltham Library.

Eltham High School is operating a publicly accessible weather station since 2003, providing live and historical weather data.

== See also ==
- Shire of Diamond Valley – Eltham North was previously within this former local government area.
- Eltham North
- Eltham North Primary School
