= Montmorency, Victoria =

Montmorency
- Suburb
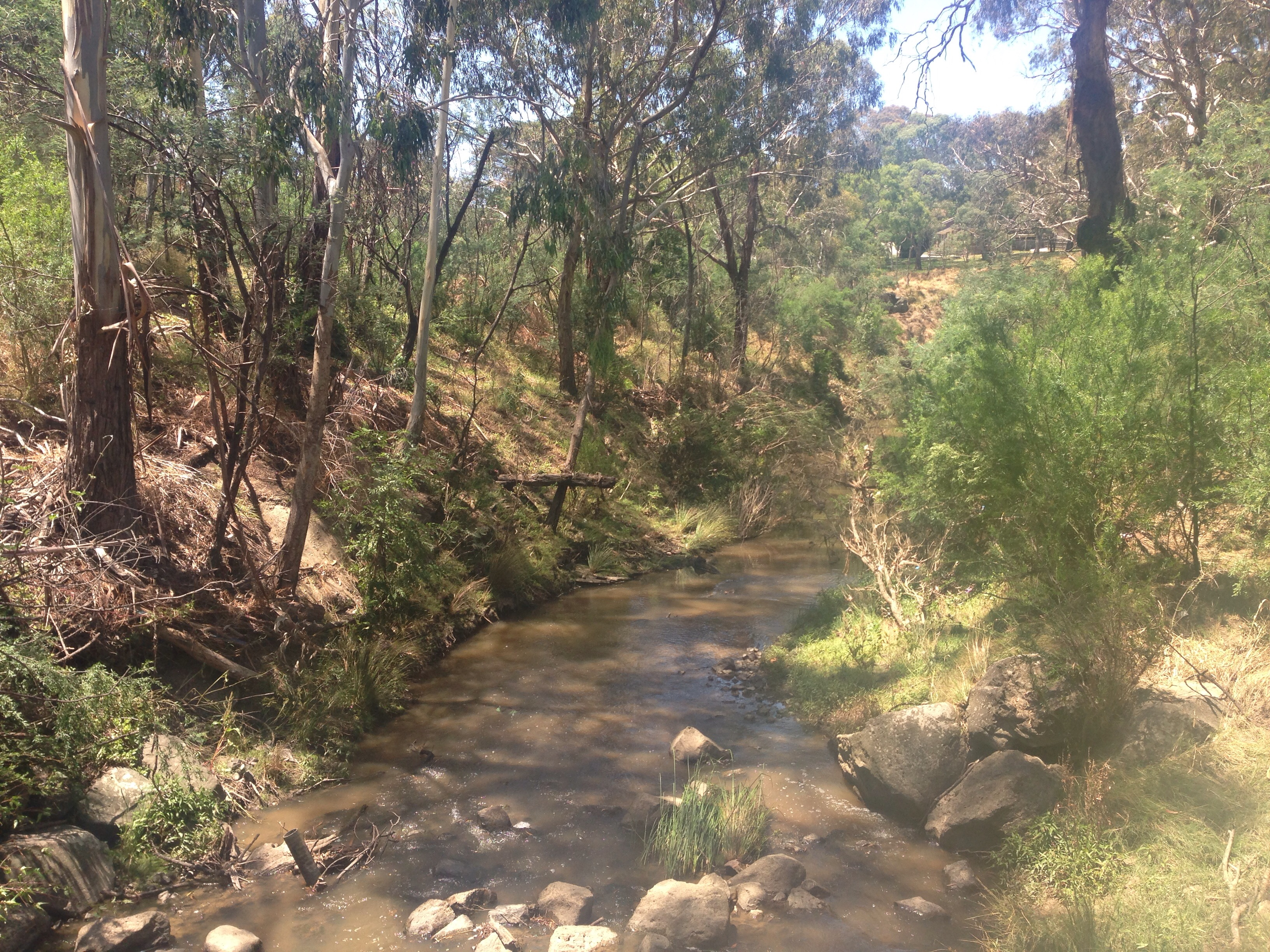
- Plenty River, Montmorency

- Interactive map of Montmorency
- Coordinates: 37.719°S 145.126°E
- Country: Australia
- State: Victoria
- City: Melbourne
- LGA: City of Banyule
- Location: 18 km (11 mi) from Melbourne
- Established: 1917

Government
  - State electorate: Eltham
  - Federal division: Jagajaga

Area
  - Total: 3.8 km^{2} (1.5 sq mi)

Population
  - Total: 9,250 (2021 census)
  - Density: 2,430/km^{2} (6,300/sq mi)
- Postcode: 3094
Suburbs around Montmorency
Greensborough	Briar Hill	Eltham North
Watsonia	Montmorency	Eltham
Yallambie	Lower Plenty	Eltham

Montmorency (/ˌmɒnməˈrɛnsi/ MON-mə-REN-see) is a suburb of Melbourne, Victoria, Australia, 18 km (11 mi) north-east from Melbourne's Central Business District, located within the City of Banyule local government area. Montmorency recorded a population of 9,250 at the 2021 census.

Montmorency was named after a local farm, Montmorency Estate, which in turn was named after the town of Montmorency, Val-d'Oise, where the French Enlightenment philosopher Jean-Jacques Rousseau lived briefly. Locals of Montmorency often refer to the suburb as "Monty", and the nickname is incorporated into some local business names.

== History ==
The first people on the land now known as Montmorency were the Wurundjeri-willam people.

Merchant Stuart Alexander Donaldson (1812–1867), the first Premier of New South Wales, owned the farming property known as "The Montmorency Estate" until the 1840s. The first evidence of a township was the building of a Presbyterian church in 1917 in the midst of small rural landholdings. Montmorency Primary School was opened in 1922, the year before Montmorency station was opened on the Hurstbridge railway line. Electricity was connected to the area in 1926. Montmorency Post Office opened around September 1923.

Whilst there was a residential nucleus from the 1920s, most of Montmorency consisted of orchards, dairying, and poultry farms until after the Second World War. The estimated population in 1922 was 200, including weekenders.

In 1950 the estimated population was 600, and facilities extended to two churches, a public hall, a sports ground and a tennis court. By the end of the decade the population had increased fivefold, although still with unoccupied building sites which had fine views. A modern shopping centre and factories had been built.

== Schools ==
- Montmorency Primary School
- Montmorency Secondary College – Opened in 1969
- Montmorency South Primary School
- St. Francis Xavier Catholic Primary School – Opened in 1932

== Facilities ==
The main commercial street is Were Street. A three-storey high ornamental aeration windmill stands at the corner of Were Street and Rattray Road. The footpaths of Were Street are inlaid with mosaic pictures representing scenes from oral histories of the suburb. This shopping strip is notable for the relatively low proportion of national chain stores and franchises among its businesses.

There is a second business precinct located 1.1 km to the south east of Were Street, on Grand Boulevard, mainly catering to small offices. In Mountain View Road there is an RSL which serves counter meals, a lawn bowls club, and the Montmorency Scout Hall with access to the Petrie Park Oval opposite all of these services. There is a Montmorency Bridge Club which originally met weekly in the Montmorency Primary School, beginning in about 2010. Since about 2015, the Club moved to more convenient premises in Eltham where it still meets on Tuesday evenings. Although it is not affiliated with the Victorian Bridge Association, it nevertheless has up to 32 players attending each week.

Montmorency Football Club, an Australian rules football team, competes in the Northern Football League. Its playing field and clubhouse are located at Montmorency Park in the green belt between Para Road and the Plenty River. Lower Plenty Football Club are also in the same league and are also based at Montmorency Park.

Montmorency has hilly parklands adjoining the Plenty River on its western side and several neighbourhood parks, particularly in its south-east sector.

Public library services are provided by Yarra Plenty Regional Library. The nearest libraries are Diamond Valley Library in Greensborough, Watsonia Library and Eltham library.

== Transport ==
Montmorency is close to outlying towns and suburbs such as Eltham, Greensborough, Templestowe and Doncaster, for it lies within the main feeder roads to these suburbs. The Box Hill 293, Frankston/Melbourne Airport 901 and Glenroy/Eltham 513/514 bus routes also service the area.

It lies on the Hurstbridge Line, and it takes around 48 minutes to reach Montmorency Station from the CBD of Melbourne.

== Notable people ==
- Sharin Anderson - musician, grew up in Montmorency
- Mark Fraser - footballer, born 1971
- Gotye - musician, born 1980
- Peter Helliar - comedian and broadcaster
- Dayyan Eng - film director, lived in Montmorency as a teenager
- Brett Wood - musician

== See also ==
- Shire of Eltham – Montmorency was previously within this former local government area
