= Willinda Park =

Coordinates: 37°42′39″S 145°6′37″E

Willinda Park, Greensborough is located at the end of Nell Street, Greensborough and is maintained by the City of Banyule and the Willinda Park Committee of Management.

Willinda Park has a polyurethane athletic track and is the home of Diamond Valley Little Athletics Centre, Diamond Valley Athletic Club and Ivanhoe Harriers

What is now Willinda Park was once market gardens owned by William and Beatrice Linda Holmes. Hence how the name Willinda was derived.

In 1963 and following William's death the Melbourne and Metropolitan Board of Works compulsorily acquired the majority of the Holmes property; a little over 9 acres (36,000 m^{2}) for drainage and sewerage purposes for the sum of 6927 pounds. As was common practice in these times the Melbourne and Metropolitan Board of Works made such land available to local councils as reserves, often for recreation purposes.

In April 1967, Linda Holmes voluntarily transferred a further small triangular section of land approximately 25 feet (7.6 m) x 80 feet (24 m) x 89 feet (27 m) in size to the Shire of Diamond Valley for $650 to assist in accessing the larger portion of land. This smaller section of land is still easily identifiable today as it forms part of the entrance to the park giving the property on the left (21 Talbot Street) with the red brick wall an angular appearance.

When the Diamond Valley Little Athletics Centre formed in 1967 work began in earnest to find a suitable home. While the view was held that any existing reserve in the shire would be suitable, A K Lines Reserve in Watsonia sat on the top of the list.

Prior to the centres first competition on 30 September 1967, Willinda Park which until that point in time had not been allocated to any sporting club was offered as a home by the Shire of Diamond Valley with Linda Holmes blessing.

Initially the Park was little more than a paddock; with only a 300-metre athletic track being able to be accommodated. Over the ensuing decades vast improvements have been made to the track surface and the adjoining facilities. Greensborough Soccer Club played matches for men, women and boys here until 1986.

Apart from three seasons when track improvement work was being undertaken; 1973/74 when competition was held at A K Lines Reserve, Watsonia. 1999/2000 and 2018/2019 when competition was held at Meadowglen International Athletic Stadium at Epping, athletic competition has been held at Willinda Park.

Today Willinda Park is a dedicated state of the art athletic facility with an international standard surface and lighting enabling twilight competitions to be held.

== Willinda Park Gallery ==
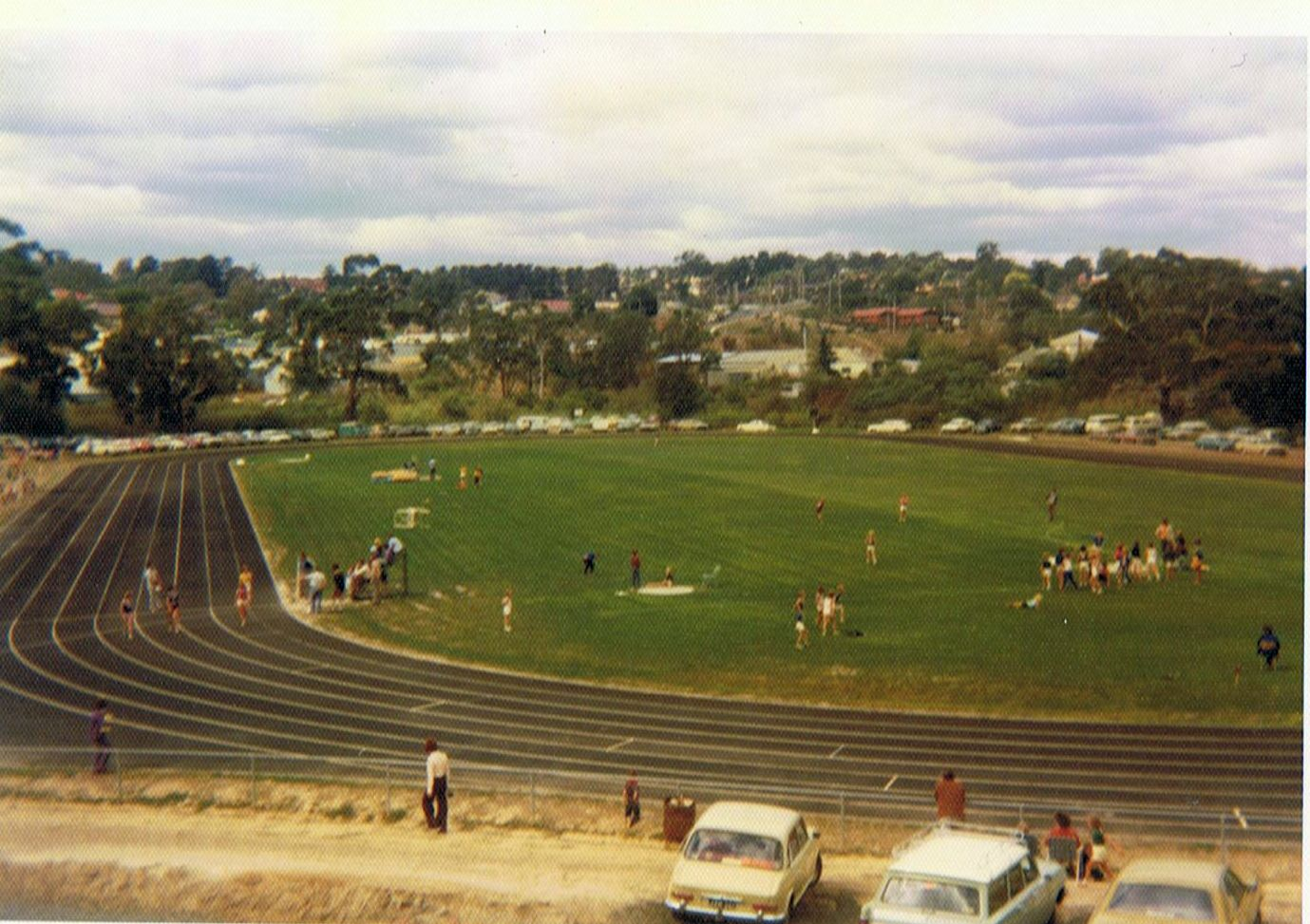
Willinda Park Circa 1975

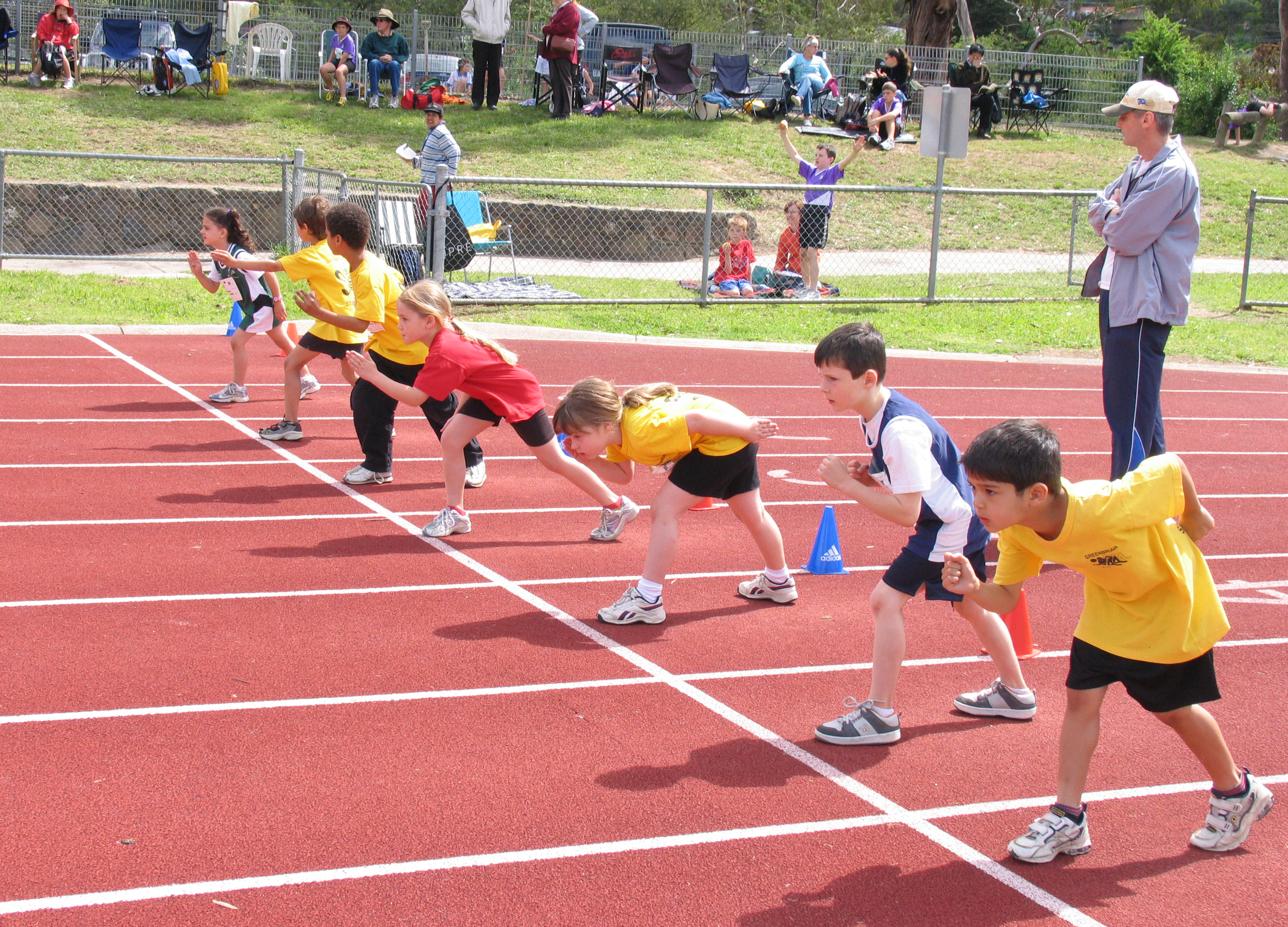
Willinda Park 2005
