= Diamond Valley United SC =

Diamond Valley United Soccer Club
- Full name: Diamond Valley United Soccer Club
- Nickname: The Valley
- Founded: 1986
- Ground: Partingtons Flat, Greensborough, Victoria
- Coach: Steven Clark
- League: Victorian State League Division 3 North-West
- 2023: 5th.

Diamond Valley United Soccer Club is a soccer club based in Greensborough, Victoria, Australia.

Greensborough SC played at Willinda Park, Greensborough, until 2003 when that ground became dedicated to athletics. The local members then joined Heidelberg-Bundoora to create Diamond Valley United Soccer Club in 1986. Notably, Eltham SC also merged with the club in 1989.

The old Greensborough SC was taken over by a Cypriot community who moved the club to City of Moorabbin with the new name of Bentleigh Greens SC. The colours were subsequently changed from green and white to all green.

Diamond Valley United Soccer Club is currently (2023) in Victorian State League Division 3 North-West and plays its home games at Partingtons Flat, Greensborough.
