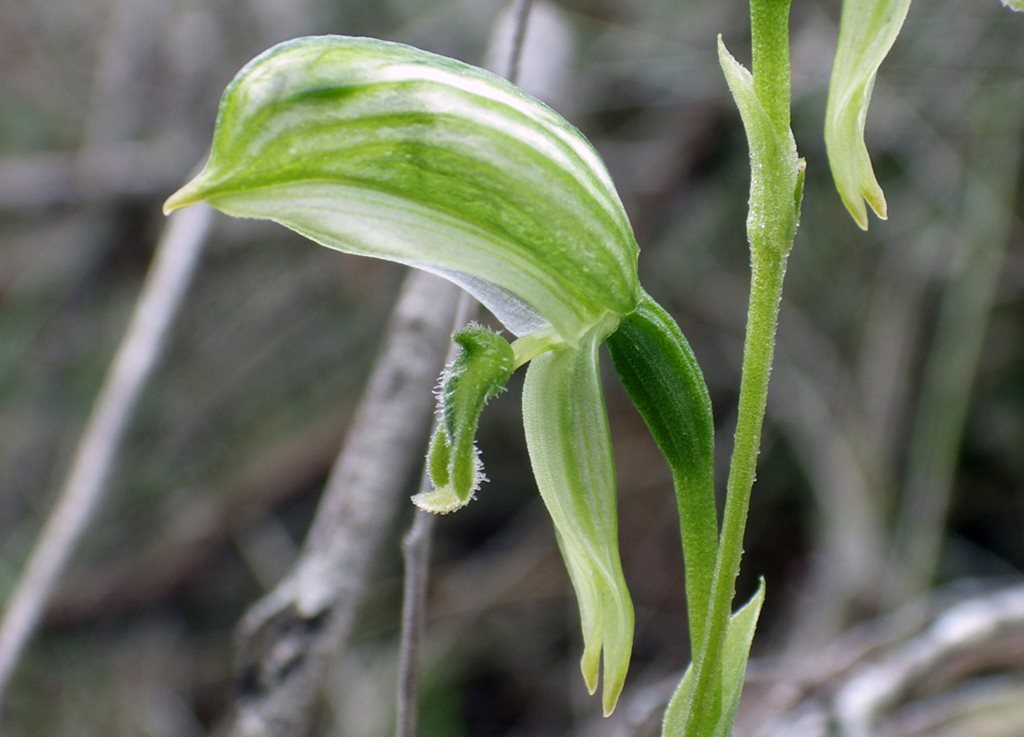
- In Grampians National Park

Scientific classification
- Kingdom: Plantae
- Clade: Tracheophytes
- Clade: Angiosperms
- Clade: Monocots
- Order: Asparagales
- Family: Orchidaceae
- Subfamily: Orchidoideae
- Tribe: Cranichideae
- Genus: Pterostylis
- Species: P. smaragdyna

Binomial name
- Pterostylis smaragdyna D.L.Jones & M.A.Clem.

Synonyms
- Bunochilus smaragdynus (D.L.Jones & M.A.Clem.) D.L.Jones & M.A.Clem.; Pterostylis sp. aff. longifolia (Greensborough); Pterostylis longifolia auct. non R.Br.: Weber, J.Z. & Bates, R. in Jessop, J.P. & Toelken, H.R. (ed.) (1986)

= Pterostylis smaragdyna =

Emerald-lip leafy greenhood

Species of orchid

Pterostylis smaragdyna, commonly known as emerald-lip leafy greenhood, is a plant in the orchid family Orchidaceae and is endemic to south-eastern Australia. Flowering plants have up to ten translucent green flowers with darker green markings. The flowers have an insect-like labellum which is green with a darker green mound at the "head" end. Non-flowering plants have a rosette of leaves but flowering plants lack the rosette, instead having five to seven stem leaves.

== Description ==
Pterostylis longifolia, is a terrestrial, perennial, deciduous, herb with an underground tuber. Non-flowering plants have a rosette of between three and five lance-shaped leaves, each leaf 10–45 mm (0.4–2 in) long and 4–8 mm (0.2–0.3 in) wide. Flowering plants have up to ten translucent green flowers with darker green markings on a flowering spike 200–500 mm (8–20 in) high. The flowering spike has between five and seven linear to lance-shaped stem leaves which are 20–100 mm (0.8–4 in) long and 3–5 mm (0.1–0.2 in) wide. The dorsal sepal and petals are fused, forming a hood or "galea" over the column with the dorsal sepal having a short point on its tip. The lateral sepals turn downwards, 16–19 mm (0.6–0.7 in) long, 7–8 mm (0.28–0.31 in) wide and joined for most of their length. The labellum is insect-like, 7–8 mm (0.28–0.31 in) long, about 4 mm (0.2 in) wide, pale green with a dark geen stripe along it centre and a dark green mound on the "head" end. Flowering occurs from June to August.

== Taxonomy and naming ==
Pterostylis smaragdyna was first formally described in 1993 by David Jones and Mark Clements and the description was published in Muelleria from a specimen collected near Diamond Creek. The specific epithet (smaragdyna) is from the Latin word smaragdinus meaning "emerald green", referring to the colour of the labellum of this species.

== Distribution and habitat ==
Emerald-lip leafy greenhood grows in dry forest and woodland in the south-east corner of New South Wales, central Victoria including the outer suburbs of Melbourne and in the south-east of South Australia.
