= Division of Jagajaga =

Australian federal electoral division

Coordinates: 37.729°S 145.117°E

Jagajaga Australian House of Representatives Division
- Interactive map of electorate boundaries from the 2025 federal election
- Created: 1984
- MP: Kate Thwaites
- Party: Labor
- Namesake: Three Wurundjeri elders
- Electors: 121,332 (2025)
- Area: 137 km^{2} (52.9 sq mi)
- Demographic: Outer metropolitan

The Division of Jagajaga is an Australian Electoral Division in the state of Victoria. It is located in the north-eastern suburbs of Melbourne, and lies north of the Yarra River. As of 2025, the division contains the entire City of Banyule and parts of the Shire of Nillumbik and City of Whittlesea local government areas.

The area is predominantly residential and light industrial, and includes the Australian Army's Simpson Barracks, the Heidelberg Repatriation Hospital, the Mercy Hospital for Women and the Austin Hospital.

Four Legislative Assembly Districts are represented in the Division, namely Ivanhoe, Eltham, Bundoora, and Eildon. The Legislative Council Regions of North-Eastern Metropolitan and Northern Victoria are also represented.

== Geography ==
Since 1984, federal electoral division boundaries in Australia have been determined at redistributions by a redistribution committee appointed by the Australian Electoral Commission. Redistributions occur for the boundaries of divisions in a particular state, and they occur every seven years, or sooner if a state's representation entitlement changes or when divisions of a state are malapportioned.

When the division was created in 1984, it replaced the eastern half of the Division of Batman, a portion of Division of Scullin (around Bundoora and Watsonia), and a portion of the abolished Division of Diamond Valley (Yallamie and Viewbank). In 1989, the division lost areas to the north (north of Grimshaw Street) and to the south (Ivanhoe East and Eaglemont), but expanded eastwards up to Eltham. The division was further expanded eastwards in 2003 and 2010 to include North Warrandyte and Kangaroo Ground respectively, with minimal changes to its western and southern boundaries. In 2018, the division lost its eastern half east of Eltham (inclusive) to the Division of Menzies, but gained areas to the north such as Diamond Creek and Plenty. This boundary change was reversed in the following redistributions in 2021 (except North Warrandyte) and 2024 (re-gaining North Warrandyte).

Since 1994 (except a brief period between 2018 and 2021), the entire City of Banyule is contained within the division's boundaries, and the division shares its western and southern boundaries with the City of Banyule boundaries most of the time. The division is also bordered by the Yarra River to the south throughout the division's existence, and since 2010 (except between 2018 and 2024), it is bordered by the river between Ivanhoe East and Kangaroo Ground.

As of the 2024 redistribution, the division covers the City of Banyule and parts of the Shire of Nillumbik and City of Whittlesea local government areas, covering an area of approximately 137 square kilometres. It comprises the suburbs of Bellfield, Briar Hill, Eaglemont, Eltham, Eltham North, Greensborough, Heidelberg, Heidelberg Heights, Heidelberg West, Ivanhoe, Ivanhoe East, Lower Plenty, Montmorency, North Warrandyte, Plenty, Rosanna, St Helena, Viewbank, Yallambie, Watsonia and Watsonia North; the township of Kangaroo Ground; and parts of Bundoora and Macleod.

== History ==
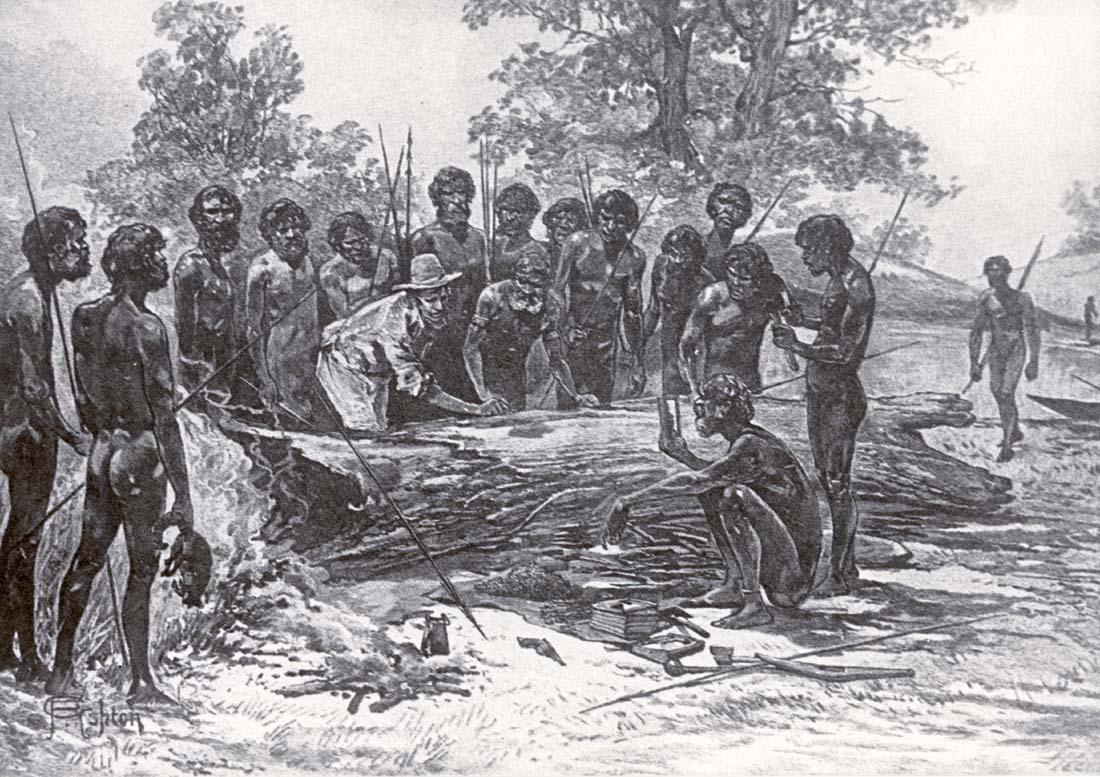
The Wurundjeri Aboriginal Australian men believed to have made the Batman Treaty with John Batman. The division's namesake comes from three of these elders.

The Division was proclaimed at the redistribution of 14 September 1984, and was first contested at the 1984 election. It was named after three Wurundjeri Aboriginal Australian men who supposedly made the Batman Treaty with the party of early colonial settler and one of the founders of Melbourne, John Batman in 1835.

The Division has always been a marginal-to-safe Labor seat. It was first held by Peter Staples, who was the previous member for Diamond Valley. Staples served as a minister under Bob Hawke and Paul Keating. Staples retired in 1996 and was replaced by Jenny Macklin, who has held the seat prior to her retirement in 2018. Macklin served as Deputy Leader of the Australian Labor Party under Simon Crean, Mark Latham and Kim Beazley, as well as a minister under Kevin Rudd and Julia Gillard. In 2018, Macklin announced her retirement from politics. Kate Thwaites replaced Macklin as Labor's candidate for the area and subsequently won the seat in the 2019 Australian federal election.

== Members ==
Image	Member	Party	Term	Notes
	Peter Staples (1947–)	Labor	1 December 1984 – 29 January 1996	Previously held the Division of Diamond Valley. Served as minister under Hawke and Keating. Retired
	Jenny Macklin (1953–)	Labor	2 March 1996 – 11 April 2019	Served as minister under Rudd and Gillard. Retired.
	Kate Thwaites (1980–)	Labor	18 May 2019 – present	Incumbent

== Election results ==
2025 Australian federal election: Jagajaga
Party	Candidate	Votes	%	±%
Labor	Kate Thwaites	47,284	42.56	+1.81
Liberal	Chris Parr	32,724	29.45	+0.21
Greens	Jy Sandford	17,334	15.60	−1.09
Independent	Chris Kearney	5,167	4.65	+4.65
One Nation	Leslie Ralph	4,297	3.87	+1.56
Family First	Rae Rancie	2,775	2.50	+2.50
Independent	Abdi Mohamed	1,518	1.37	+1.37
Total formal votes		111,099	97.13	+0.93
Informal votes		3,288	2.87	−0.93
Turnout		114,387	94.33	+2.20
Two-party-preferred result
Labor	Kate Thwaites	69,858	62.88	+0.67
Liberal	Chris Parr	41,241	37.12	−0.67
Labor hold		Swing	+0.67	

== Opinion polling ==
=== 2022–2025 ===
Date	Firm	Sample size	Margin of error	Primary vote						2PP vote	
Date	Firm	Sample size	Margin of error	ALP	LIB	GRN	IND	ONP	OTH	ALP	LIB
3 May 2025	2025 federal election			42.6%	29.4%	15.6%	6.0%	3.9%	2.5%	62.9%	37.1%
1–29 Apr 2025	YouGov (MRP)	10,822	—	38.8%	27.2%	17.6%	6.6%	5.4%	4.3%	60.8%	39.2%
3 Feb – 1 Apr 2025	Accent/RedBridge (MRP)	9,953	—	43%	32%	13%	—	—	12%	61%	39%
27 Feb – 26 Mar 2025	YouGov (MRP)	10,217	—	37%	30.2%	16.9%	7.7%	4.8%	3.4%	58.2:%	41.8%
22 Jan – 12 Feb 2025	YouGov (MRP)	8,732	—	36.1%	32%	15.2%	8%	5.2%	3.6%	56.2%	43.8%
29 Oct – 20 Nov 2024	Accent/RedBridge (MRP)	4,909	—	41%	37%	12%	—	—	10%	56%	44%
10 Jul – 27 Aug 2024	Accent/RedBridge (MRP)	5,976	—	40%	35%	16%	—	—	9%	59%	41%
Feb – May 2024	Accent/RedBridge (MRP)	4,040	—	39%	33%	18%	—	—	10%	61%	39%
21 May 2022	2022 federal election			40.9%	29.2%	16.7%	3.1%	2.3%	7.9%	62.4%	37.7%
