= Eltham Redbacks FC =

Australian semi-professional soccer club based in Eltham North, Victoria

Eltham Redbacks
- Full name: Eltham Redbacks Football Club
- Nickname: Redbacks
- Founded: 1967; 59 years ago (as Eltham Soccer Club)
- Ground: Eltham North Reserve; Eltham North, Victoria
- Capacity: 1,000
- Head coach: George Katsakis (Men's); Jonathan Barrientos (Women's)
- League: Victorian Premier League Men's; National Premier Leagues Victoria Women (Women's)
- 2026: VPL 1, Semi-finalists (Men's); VPLW, 1st (Champions) (Women's)
- Website: elthamredbacks.com.au
Home colours	Away colours

Eltham Redbacks Football Club is an Australian semi-professional soccer club based in Eltham North, Victoria. Founded in 1967 as Eltham Soccer Club, the club competes in Victorian Premier League 1 Men and National Premier Leagues Victoria Women (NPLW).

== History ==
The club was established in 1967 as Eltham Soccer Club, initially training and playing at Eltham Lower Park. During the 1980s, the club relocated to its permanent base at Eltham North Reserve.

In 1989, the senior club merged temporarily with Diamond Valley United to compete under the name Eltham-Diamond Valley United, while junior and women's teams continued operating independently under the Eltham North banner.

=== State League rise (2009-2024) ===
In 2009, the club formally rebranded as the Eltham Redbacks Football Club. Over the next decade, the senior men's squad climbed through the Football Victoria State League tiers.

In 2017 Eltham Redbacks won the Victorian State League 2 South-East championship, earning promotion to State League 1.

In 2024, the club claimed the Victorian State League 1 South-East title, securing promotion into the National Premier Leagues/Victorian Premier League structure for the first time.

=== VPL and NPLW era (2025-present) ===
In their debut 2025 season in Victorian Premier League 2, the senior men finished as league runners-up to achieve consecutive promotions into Victorian Premier League 1. In 2026, the men's team reached the VPL 1 semi-finals before appointing experienced Victorian coach George Katsakis as senior head coach ahead of the 2027 season. Former New Zealand international Marco Rojas joining the club's youth and senior coaching setup for 2027.

In 2026, the senior women's team coached by Jonathan Barrientos won the Victorian Premier League Women's (VPLW) championship, earning promotion to National Premier Leagues Victoria Women for 2027.

== Ground and facilities ==
Eltham Redbacks play their home matches at Eltham North Reserve, located on Wattletree Road in Eltham North. The venue features multiple playing pitches, floodlighting, pavilion facilities, and a spectator capacity of approximately 1,000.

In 2019, Eltham North Reserve had $4million government investment to upgrade ageing facilities.

== Club structure ==
The club maintains a membership of over 1,000 registered players across MiniRoos, community juniors, Victorian Youth Premier League (VYPL) squads, senior men's and women's teams, and over 35s/Masters programs.

== Honours ==
=== Men's ===
- Victorian Premier League 2
  - Runners-up (1): 2025
- Victorian State League 1 South-East
  - Champions (1): 2024
- Victorian State League 2 South-East
  - Champions (1): 2017

=== Women's ===
- Victorian Premier League Women's (VPLW)
  - Champions (1): 2026
