= Banyule =

Banyule may refer to places in Australia named after an Indigenous Australian word for "hill":

- Banyule, Victoria, a locality within Heidelberg, Victoria
- Banyule City Council, a local government area in Victoria
- Banyule Homestead, historic property in Victoria

== See also ==
- Banyuls-sur-Mer
