= Diamond Creek =

- Suburb
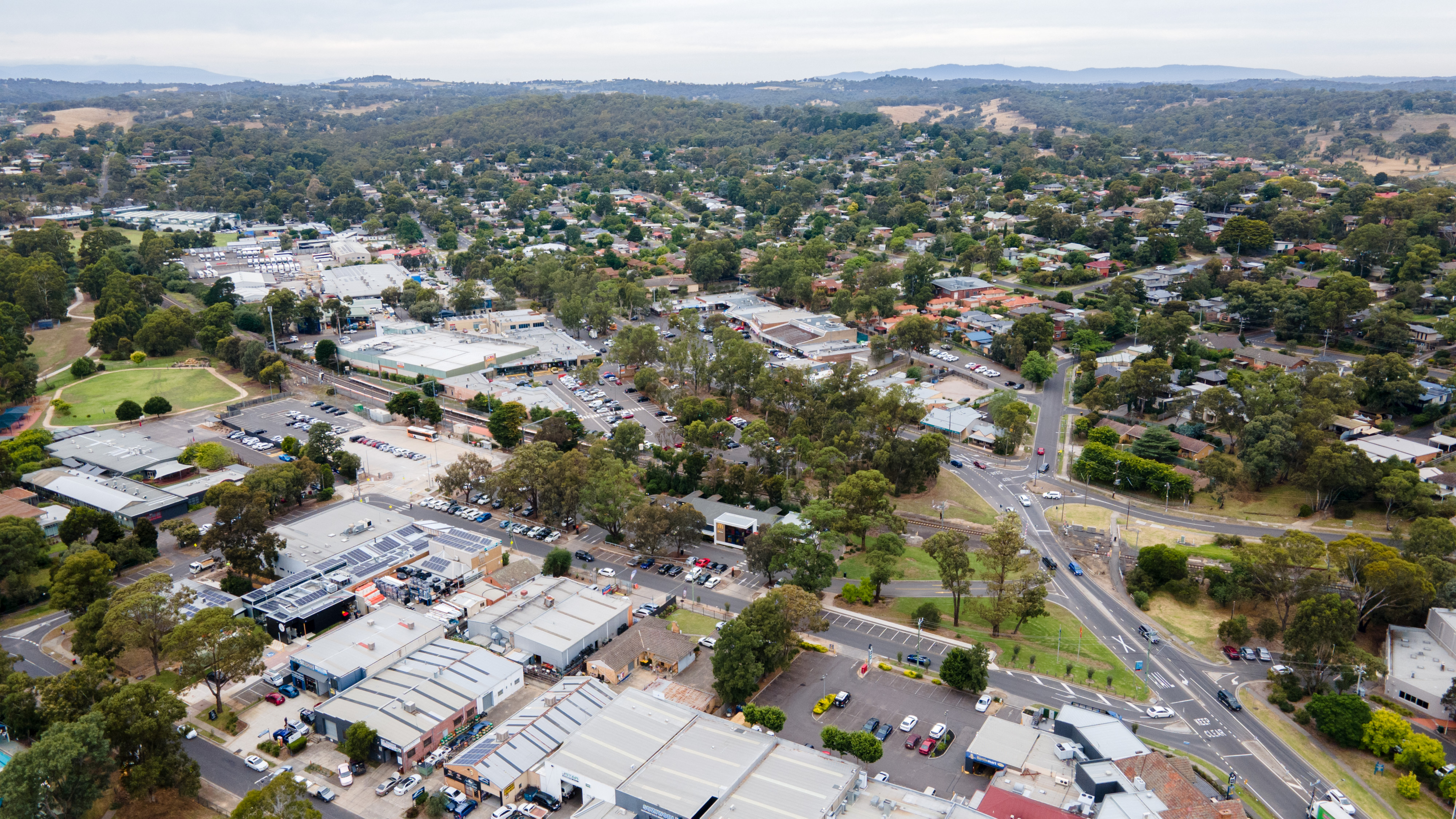
- View of central Diamond Creek looking north-east in January 2021.

- Interactive map of Diamond Creek
- Coordinates: 37.671°S 145.155°E
- Country: Australia
- State: Victoria
- City: Melbourne
- LGA: Shire of Nillumbik
- Location: 23 km (14 mi) from Melbourne; 7 km (4.3 mi) from Hurstbridge
- Established: 1841

Government
  - State electorates: Eltham; Yan Yean
  - Federal division: McEwen

Area
  - Total: 18.3 km^{2} (7.1 sq mi)

Population
  - Total: 12,503 (2021 census)
  - Density: 683.2/km^{2} (1,770/sq mi)
- Postcode: 3089
Suburbs around Diamond Creek
Yarrambat	Hurstbridge	Wattle Glen
Plenty	Diamond Creek	Kangaroo Ground
Greensborough	Eltham North	Research

Diamond Creek is a suburb of Melbourne, Victoria, Australia, 23 km north-east of Melbourne's Central Business District, located within the Shire of Nillumbik local government area. Diamond Creek recorded a population of 12,503 at the 2021 census.

== History ==
There are two ideas about where Diamond Creek got its name. Victoria's Register of Geographic Names says that it was because of the way the stones glistened in the creek water. Local legend says it is because of a bull who was trying to cross a creek. The bull had a diamond shaped white patch on its head and found difficulty crossing the creek. Thus the Bullocky named the town after the bull with the diamond shape on its head and the creek it drowned in.

The Ellis family were pioneers of the District and benefactors of the Nillumbik cemetery gateway. Ellis Cottage, a rubble-stone hipped roof cottage contains its original fabric and is considered historically significant and is on the Victorian Heritage database.

Gold was first discovered in Diamond Creek in 1863 by Messrs Peers, Haley and Wilson. The Diamond Creek mine was opened some years after gold was first discovered and dug 700 feet vertical and 300 feet underlay. The value of gold taken from the mine was reported to be between £1,000,000 and £2,000,000 Australian at the time.

In 1867, the Nillumbik cemetery at Diamond Creek was established. It occupies an area of two acres between Main and Edinburgh Streets and is positioned on high ground above Sawpit Creek and the Diamond Creek floodplain. It is laid out in a grid formation. A brick and rendered archway was built in 1897. The cemetery is considered significant and is listed on the Victorian heritage database.

From 1894 to 1969 there were a number of bushfires. In 1894, houses and stock were destroyed.

In the postwar years, population increased dramatically in Diamond Creek and its neighbouring areas. The Diamond Valley Shire was created out of the northern part of the Shire of Heidelberg in 1964. Further population growth occurred throughout the 1970s. The early 20th century saw a decline in the orchard industry, as orchards in Melbourne's eastern townships such as Doncaster and Nunawading, fell into favour due to better marketing. Diamond Creek remained relatively untouched during the boom in recreational travel that followed the popularity of the motor car.

Diamond Creek was home to a Donkey Shelter from 1997 to 2012, which provided accommodation and care for neglected donkeys from around the state of Victoria. In 2012, this moved to Tongala.

== Geography ==
The Diamond Creek Shopping Centre and railway station are located on the banks of Diamond Creek, and the Hurstbridge railway line follows the course of Diamond Creek northwards from Eltham to its terminus at Hurstbridge.

== Schools ==
Schools in Diamond Creek include Diamond Valley College, Plenty Valley International Montessori School, Sacred Heart Primary School, Diamond Creek Primary School, Diamond Creek East Primary School. The Diamond Creek East Primary School opened in 1970.

== Facilities ==
The St John's Anglican church complex in Main Street includes a Sunday school and parish hall. The church is amongst the oldest buildings in the Shire of Nillumbik, built about 1867. It has three stained glass windows. The complex is considered significant and is listed on the Victorian Heritage Register.

On the other side of St John's is Ashton Manor, previously known as The Abbey. It was a reception centre and very popular for weddings and other celebrations. It is now the location for Tobin Brothers Funerals.

Nillumbik Historical Society was formed in 1973 and is situated in the Ellis Cottage historical precinct.

The Diamond Creek Community Centre is jointly administered by the Shire of Nillumbik and the YMCA, and provides a venue for basketball, gymnasium and group fitness classes, child care, community classes and public and private functions. The centre also houses Nillumbik's Maternal and Child Health Service. The Community Centre served as an evacuation point, providing emergency accommodation, first aid and government relief to local residents affected by the February 2009 Victorian bushfires. Diamond Creek has two football clubs, Diamond Creek Football Club and Diamond Creek Women's football club playing in the Northern Football League.

The Rotary Club of Diamond Creek organise the annual Diamond Creek Town Fair, a community event held in September. It commences with a parade which features local schools, scouting groups, child care centres and community groups. The fair offers food, crafts and fairground attractions, rides, wood chopping, local community stallholders, and entertainment. It traditionally concludes with an evening torchlight parade by the local CFA units and a fireworks display.

Diamond Creek Little Athletics Club is one of the eight clubs competing weekly at the Diamond Valley Little Athletics Centre at Willinda Park Greensborough.

Diamond Creek also has a busy CFA (Country Fire Authority) volunteer fire brigade, which attends to over 230 emergency calls annually. The brigade was established in 1942. In 2005, a new emergency services centre was built on the Main Hurstbridge Rd, which includes CFA, Metropolitan Ambulance Service and Police facilities. The Diamond Creek CFA brigade has approximately 60 members, one pumper, two tankers, a slip on ute and a Toyota Hilux FCV, as well as an extensive collection of modern, advanced firefighting equipment and training facilities.

Diamond Creek is serviced by the Diamond Valley Division of St John Ambulance Australia (Victoria). St John Ambulance provides emergency pre-hospital care to local events in Diamond Creek, such as the Town Fair, Pet Expo, Fun Runs and many other local events. The Diamond Valley division is based in Greensborough.

In 1981, an opportunity shop opened to raise funds for the Austin Hospital in Heidelberg. It raised over $2 million in its 30-year operation until its closure in 2011 when the building was deemed unsafe. In February 2013, the shop re-opened after a benefactor donated funds for the hospital to meet the cost of the renovations.

The Diamond Creek OM:NI discussion group was formed in 2010. They meet at the Diamond Creek Netball Club

A new dedicated ambulance home base was opened in April 2019. Paramedics were previously housed in the emergency services complex with police and firefighters. The branch features a spacious garage for vehicles, rest and recline areas, a training room and kitchen, The branch provides 24-hour emergency care.

A Tram Cafe opened in October 2020. This is a fully refurbished W Class Melbourne tram acquired from the Victorian State Government after a successful application by the Rotary Club of Diamond Creek, Diamond Creek CFA, Diamond Creek Men's Shed and Nillumbik Shire Council. The cafe features a large deck and pergola and state of the art playground. Araluen, a disability support service in Diamond Creek, run the cafe three days a week.

Diamond Creek is serviced by Yarra Plenty Regional Library's Mobile Library.

== Notable residents ==
- Melbourne Football Club footballers Edward Cordner and his four sons Ted, Don, Denis and John.
- Gordon Coventry - champion VFL footballer with Collingwood Football Club.
- Syd Coventry - champion VFL footballer with Collingwood Football Club.
- Lachlan Murphy - professional Australian rules footballer playing for the Adelaide Football Club in the Australian Football League (AFL).
- Kimberley Starr - award-winning Australian novelist.
- Kate Moloney- Netballer

== See also ==
- Shire of Diamond Valley – Diamond Creek was previously within this former local government area.
