= Briar Hill, Victoria =

Briar Hill Melbourne, Victoria
- Coordinates: 37.708°S 145.115°E
- Population: 3,220 (2021 census)
  - Density: 2,480/km^{2} (6,420/sq mi)
- Postcode(s): 3088
- Area: 1.3 km^{2} (0.5 sq mi)
- Location: 18 km (11 mi) from Melbourne
- LGA(s): City of Banyule
- State electorate(s): Eltham
- Federal division(s): Jagajaga
Suburbs around Briar Hill:
	Greensborough
Greensborough	Briar Hill	Eltham
	Montmorency

Briar Hill is a suburb of Melbourne, Victoria, Australia, 18 km north-east from Melbourne's Central Business District, located within the City of Banyule local government area. Briar Hill recorded a population of 3,220 at the 2021 census.

== History ==
Briar Hill Post Office opened on 1 September 1924. Briar Hill primary school was opened

== Education ==
Briar Hill Primary School, which was first established in 1927. Sherbourne Primary School, opened in approximately 1973

== Facilities ==
Public library service is provided by Yarra Plenty Regional Library. The nearest libraries are at Greensborough, Watsonia and Eltham.

== Notable people ==
Melbourne-based metal band Twelve Foot Ninja come from Briar Hill.

== See also ==
- Shire of Diamond Valley – Parts of Briar Hill were previously within this former local government area.
- Shire of Eltham – Parts of Briar Hill were previously within this former local government area.
