= City of Banyule =

Coordinates: 37°44′00″S 145°05′00″E

- Local government area
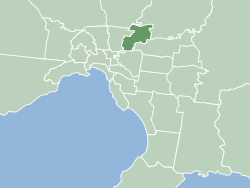
- Map of Melbourne showing Banyule

- Interactive map of City of Banyule
- Country: Australia
- State: Victoria
- Region: Greater Melbourne
- Established: 1994
- Council seat: Greensborough

Government
  - Mayor: Alison Champion
  - State electorates: Bundoora; Eltham; Ivanhoe
  - Federal division: Jagajaga

Area
  - Total: 63 km^{2} (24 sq mi)

Population
  - Total: 126,236 (2021 census)
  - Density: 2,004/km^{2} (5,190/sq mi)
- Website: City of Banyule
LGAs around City of Banyule
Whittlesea	Nillumbik	Nillumbik
Darebin	City of Banyule	Nillumbik
Yarra	Boroondara	Manningham

The City of Banyule is a local government area in Victoria, Australia in the north-eastern suburbs of Melbourne. It was created under the Local Government Act 1989 and established in 1994 as an amalgamation of former councils. It has an area of 63 square kilometres (24.3 sq mi) and lies between 7 and 21 km from central Melbourne. In 1994 it had a population of 116,000. In June 2018 Banyule had a population of 130,237. The Yarra River runs along the City's southern border while its western border is defined by Darebin Creek.

The City moved their main offices from Ivanhoe to Greensborough in 2017. A brand-new civic centre was constructed, including three-level offices to accommodate 320 council staff, community and function rooms.

== History ==
The area was originally occupied by the Wurundjeri, Indigenous Australians of the Kulin nation, who spoke variations of the Woiwurrung language group.

The City was named after the Indigenous Australian term Banyule or "Banyool", and was originally the name of a locality within the former City of Heidelberg before being adopted as the name of the new Council during the amalgamation of local government areas in Victoria. It was formed in December 1994 from the merger of the City of Heidelberg with parts of the Shires of Diamond Valley and Eltham.

The City also has some significant heritage within its boundaries. Significant buildings listed on the Victorian Heritage Register include:

- Charterisville (1840)
- Banyule (1846)
- Ravenswood (1891)
- Chadwick House (1904)
- Heidelberg Town Hall (1937)

There are a number of housing estates designed by leading early 20th Century architects Walter Burley Griffin and Marion Mahony Griffin and by property developer Albert Victor (A.V.) Jennings, some of the most significant art deco buildings in Melbourne, and the world's first Olympics athletes' village.

Banyule is the birthplace of the Heidelberg School of Art, which was formed when a group of artists, including Tom Roberts, Arthur Streeton, Frederick McCubbin, Walter Withers, Charles Conder and others moved to a shack on Mount Eagle (now known as Eaglemont) and began painting the landscape in a uniquely Australian way during the late 1880s.

=== Former councils ===
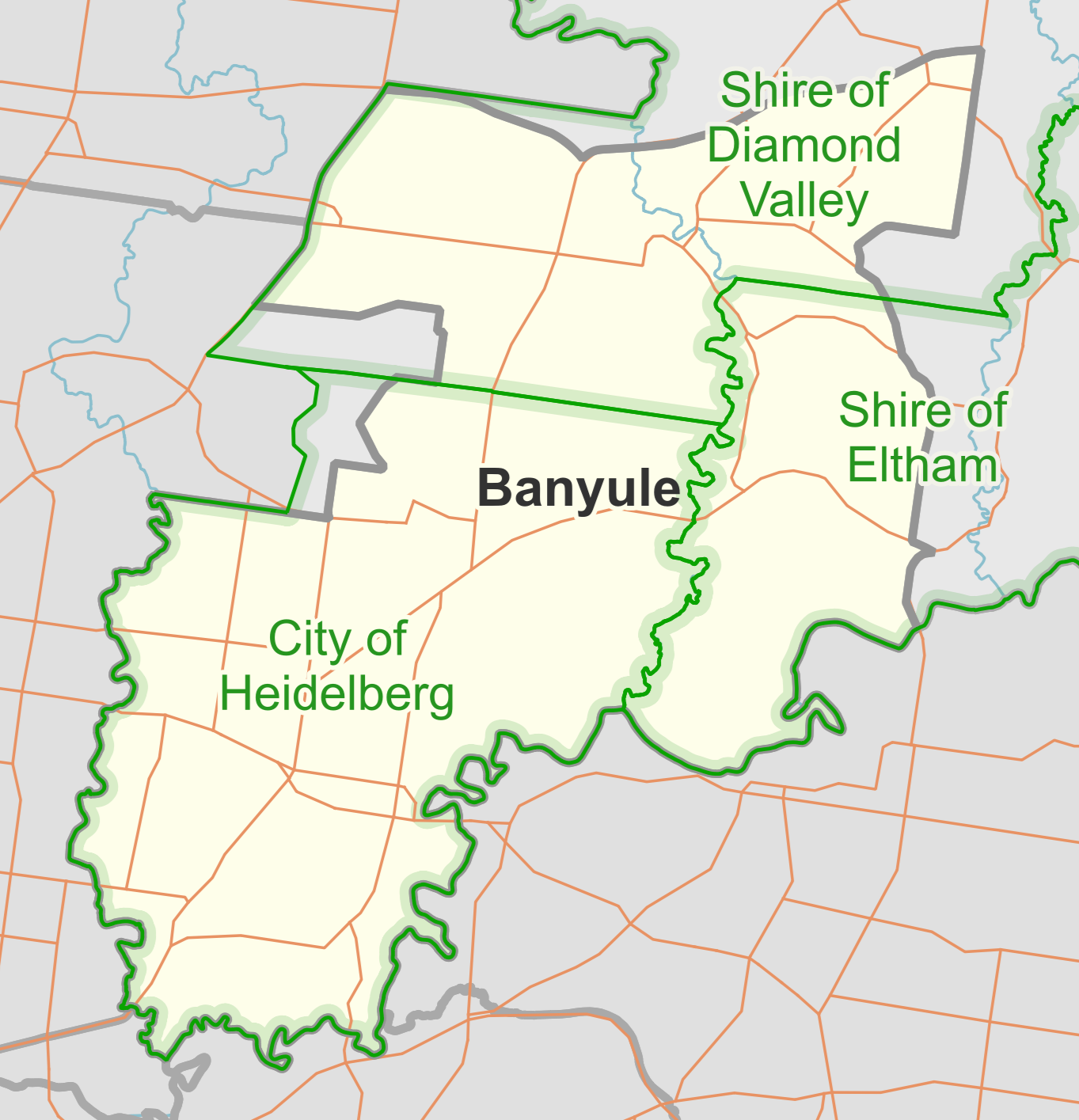
The City of Banyule's predecessor LGAs (green) as they were in 1994

Former councils which formed part of Banyule council's current jurisdiction prior to their amalgamation include:

- City of Heidelberg (all apart from the Bundoora Health precinct)
- Shire of Diamond Valley (all apart from the area north of Greensborough Highway, the Bundoora Health precinct and the eastern part of Eltham North)
- Shire of Eltham (suburbs of Montmorency and Lower Plenty only).

== Council ==
City of Banyule

Leadership
- Mayor: Alison Champion
- Deputy Mayor: Rick Garotti

Structure
- Council political groups: Independent (7); Greens (1)

Meeting place
- Nellie Ibbott Chambers, Ivanhoe Library and Cultural Hub, Ivanhoe, Victoria, Australia

2020 and 2024 ward boundaries. Expand the map and click on a ward to see the ward name.

The councillors of the City of Banyule as of October 2026 are:

Ward	Party	Councillor	Notes
Bakewell	Independent	Mark Di Pasquale	
Beale	Independent	Nicola Rooks	Elected in 2026 by-election
Chelsworth	Independent	Alida McKern	
Griffin	Greens	Peter Castaldo	
Grimshaw	Independent	Rick Garotti	Deputy Mayor
Hawdon	Independent	Matt Wood	
Ibbott	Independent	Alicia Curry	
Olympia	Independent	Mary O'Kane	
Sherbourne	Independent	Alison Champion	Mayor

== Election results ==
=== 2024 ===
2024 Victorian local elections: Banyule
Party	Votes	%	Swing	Seats	Change
Independent	43,924	66.58	−5.83	6	Steady
Greens	14,446	21.90	+9.24	2	Steady
Independent Labor	2,632	3.99	-5.57	1	Steady
Victorian Socialists	2,506	3.80	+3.80	0	Steady
Independent Liberal	2,461	3.73	−0.76	0	Steady
Formal votes	65,969	97.06	-0.37		
Informal votes	1,995	2.94	+0.37		
Total	67,964			9	

=== 2020 ===
2020 Victorian local elections: Banyule
Party	Votes	%	Seats	Change
Independent	57,081	72.41	5	Steady
Greens	9,975	12.65	2	▲1
Independent Labor	7,535	9.56	2	▲1
Independent Liberal	3,542	4.49	0	Steady
Animal Justice	699	0.89	0	Steady
Formal votes	78,832	97.44		
Informal votes	2,074	2.56		
Total	80,906		9	

== Townships and localities ==
The 2021 census, the city had a population of 126,236 up from 121,865 in the 2016 census.

Population
Locality	2016	2021
Bellfield	1,793	1,996
Briar Hill	3,152	3,220
Bundoora^	28,653	28,068
Eaglemont	3,873	3,960
Eltham North^	6,805	6,830
Greensborough^	20,821	21,070
Heidelberg	6,225	7,360
Heidelberg Heights	6,087	6,758
Heidelberg West	5,545	5,252
Ivanhoe	12,171	13,374
Ivanhoe East	3,815	3,762
Lower Plenty	3,891	3,962
Macleod^	9,769	9,892
Montmorency	8,960	9,250
Rosanna	8,498	8,616
St Helena	2,923	2,890
Viewbank	6,923	7,030
Watsonia	5,214	5,352
Watsonia North	3,814	3,799
Yallambie	4,117	4,161

^ - Territory divided with another LGA

== Notable people ==
- Cate Blanchett
- Mark Bresciano
- Alisa Camplin
- Jenny Macklin
- Ben Mendelsohn
- Brent Stanton
- Sam Bramham
- John McAll
- Gotye

== Facilities ==
Ivanhoe Library, Rosanna Library and Watsonia Library are operated by Yarra Plenty Regional Library. A mobile library service to West Heidelberg is also operated by Yarra Plenty Regional Library.

Heidelberg Historical Society is a varied group of people with a shared interest in understanding and preserving the history of Heidelberg and surrounding suburbs.

Warringal Conservation Society is a community group which advocates for the green spaces of Banyule and beyond.

U3A Banyule provides learning opportunities especially for people of 50 years and older.

== See also ==
- City of Heidelberg
