= Shire of Diamond Valley =

Coordinates: 37°41′S 145°07′E

- Local government area
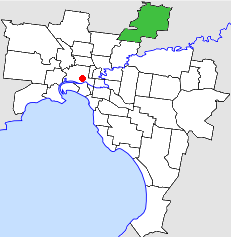
- Location in Melbourne

- The extent of the Shire of Diamond Valley
- Country: Australia
- State: Victoria
- Region: Northeast Melbourne
- Established: 1964
- Council seat: Greensborough

Area
  - Total: 74.38 km^{2} (28.72 sq mi)

Population
  - Total: 64,400 (1992)
  - Density: 865.8/km^{2} (2,242.5/sq mi)
- County: Evelyn, Bourke
LGAs around Shire of Diamond Valley
Whittlesea	Whittlesea	Eltham
Whittlesea	Shire of Diamond Valley	Eltham
Preston	Heidelberg	Eltham

The Shire of Diamond Valley was a local government area about 20 kilometres (12 mi) northeast of Melbourne, the state capital of Victoria, Australia. The shire covered an area of 74.38 square kilometres (28.72 sq mi), and existed from 1964 until 1994.

== History ==
The name relates to the lowlands to the west of Diamond Creek, a tributary of the Yarra River, which flows through nearby Eltham.

The Diamond Valley can be defined in geographical terms as the area bounded by the Plenty River, the Yarra, the Christmas Hills ridge to the east and the Great Dividing Range to the north.

Land in the area was first incorporated as part of the Heidelberg Road District on 12 October 1860, which became a shire on 27 March 1864, and was proclaimed as the City of Heidelberg on 11 April 1934. On 30 September 1964, the North Ward of the City of Heidelberg was severed, and incorporated as the Shire of Diamond Valley.

In 1863, the Diamond Reef was discovered by Thomas Wright Soady on Dr John Blakemore Phipps property, which stretched from Reynold's Road to the Diamond Creek.

In 1972, eight years after the Shire of Diamond Valley was established, a Civic Centre was constructed in Greensborough, serving as the headquarters for the local council. That building remained the council's home until 1994.

On 15 December 1994, the Shire of Diamond Valley was abolished; areas south of the Metropolitan Ring Road and the Greensborough Highway merged with the City of Heidelberg, into the newly created City of Banyule, while areas north were merged with parts of the City of Whittlesea and the Shire of Eltham, into the newly created Shire of Nillumbik. A small area in the shire's southwest, north of La Trobe University and including the Gresswell Forest Nature Reserve, was transferred to the City of Darebin.

The Diamond Valley Civic Centre in Greensborough is still used by Nillumbik Shire Council.

== Wards ==
The Shire of Diamond Valley was divided into four ridings, each of which elected three councillors:

- South West Riding
- South East Riding
- Centre Riding
- North Riding

== Suburbs ==
- Briar Hill (shared with the Shire of Eltham)
- Bundoora (shared with the Cities of Preston and Whittlesea)
- Diamond Creek
- Eltham North
- Greensborough*
- Hurstbridge (shared with the City of Whittlesea and Shire of Eltham)
- Macleod (shared with the City of Heidelberg)
- Plenty
- St Helena
- Watsonia
- Watsonia North
- Wattle Glen (shared with the Shire of Eltham)
- Yarrambat

* Council seat.

== Population ==
Year	Population
1961	15,631#
1966	22,993
1971	36,245
1976	45,461
1981	50,503
1986	55,122
1991	60,738

* Estimate in the 1958 Victorian Year Book.
# The Shire of Diamond Valley was created in 1964. Source of population: 1968 Victorian Year Book.
