= Kate Thwaites =

Australian politician (born 1980)

The Honourable Kate Thwaites MP
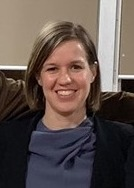
- Thwaites in 2019

Member of the Australian Parliament for Jagajaga
- Incumbent
- Assumed office 18 May 2019
- Preceded by: Jenny Macklin

Personal details
- Born: 19 January 1980 (age 46) Melbourne, Victoria, Australia
- Party: Labor
- Children: 2
- Education: RMIT University
- Occupation: Politician
- Website: www.katethwaites.com

Kate Lynne Thwaites (born 19 January 1980) is an Australian politician. She is a member of the Australian Labor Party (ALP) and has been a member of the House of Representatives since the 2019 federal election, representing the Division of Jagajaga in Victoria. She is currently serving as the Special Envoy for Climate Change Adaptation and Resilience in the Albanese government. She was a journalist and public servant before entering parliament.

== Early life ==
Thwaites was born in Melbourne on 19 January 1980. Her father was a lawyer and her mother was a schoolteacher.

Thwaites grew up in the suburb of Rosanna. She holds the degrees of Bachelor of Arts and Master of International Development from RMIT University.

== Career ==
In 2002, Thwaites began working at 2CUZ, an Indigenous community radio station in Bourke, New South Wales. She later worked for ABC News until 2008, when she joined Oxfam Australia as a media adviser. She later worked as a senior adviser to Labor MP Jenny Macklin and as communications director at the Victorian Department of Health and Human Services. She also worked with the National Disability Insurance Agency in Geelong.

== Politics ==
In July 2018, Thwaites won Labor preselection for the Division of Jagajaga, following Macklin's retirement. According to The Guardian, her victory was "almost a direct result of Josh Burns' win in Macnamara, with the Labor left concerned about its female representation". She retained Jagajaga for the ALP at the 2019 federal election with a small positive swing. Thwaites was returned as the member for Jagajaga at the 2022 Federal Election with an increased margin of over 12% of the two party preferred vote.

In 2021, Thwaites co-authored a book, Enough Is Enough, with her predecessor Jagajaga member, Jenny Macklin.

In April 2023, Thwaites co-signed an open letter to Prime Minister Anthony Albanese calling for an urgent boost to JobSeeker, Youth Allowance, and other support payments. In the same month she joined others advocating for an expansion of the single parenting payment to include more mothers.

In July 2024, she was appointed Assistant Minister for Ageing, for Social Security and for Women in the first Albanese ministry.

Following the Labor government's re-election in the 2025 Australian federal election, Thwaites was named Special Envoy for Climate Change Adaptation and Resilience in the second Albanese ministry, with her assistant ministry roles ending.

== Personal life ==
Thwaites has two young children. She has a residential property in Rosanna in Victoria and in Kingston in ACT. She has an investment property in Collingwood.

She is a member of the Community and Public Sector Union and is a member of Emily's List.

Parliament of Australia
Preceded by Jenny Macklin	Member for Jagajaga; 2019–present	Incumbent
