= Greensborough, Victoria =

Greensborough
- Suburb
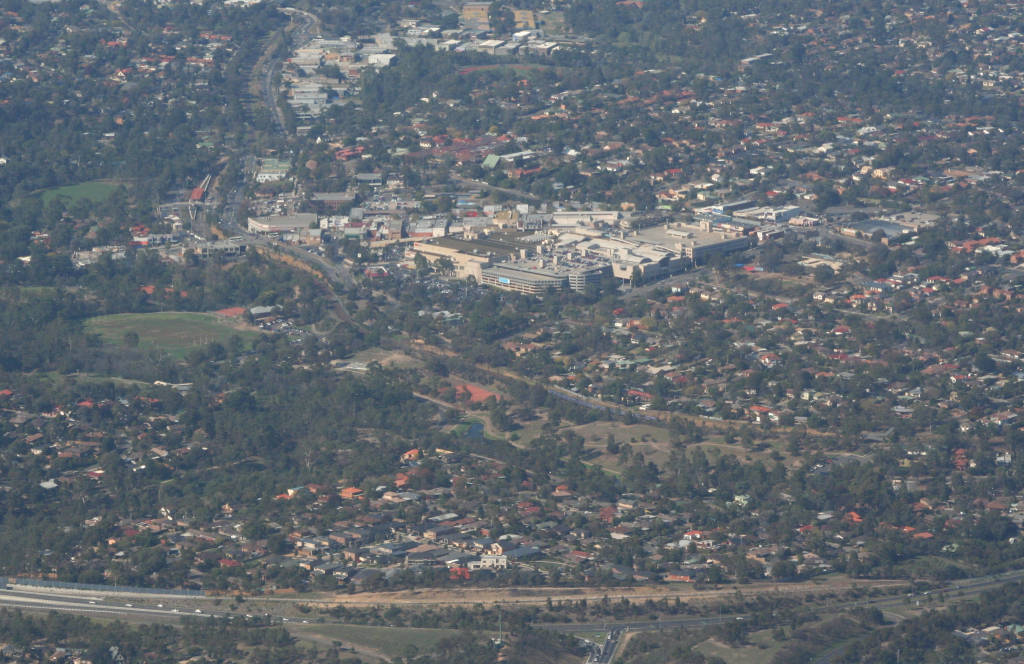
- Aerial view from the north, Greensborough Bypass just in foreground, Greensborough Plaza in centre of image, and Greensborough railway station to left.

- Interactive map of Greensborough
- Coordinates: 37.686°S 145.117°E
- Country: Australia
- State: Victoria
- City: Melbourne
- LGAs: City of Banyule; Shire of Nillumbik
- Location: 17 km (11 mi) from Melbourne CBD

Government
  - State electorates: Bundoora; Eltham
  - Federal division: Jagajaga

Area
  - Total: 11.3 km^{2} (4.4 sq mi)

Population
  - Total: 21,070 (2021 census)
  - Density: 1,865/km^{2} (4,829/sq mi)
- Postcode: 3088
Suburbs around Greensborough
Bundoora	Plenty	Diamond Creek
Watsonia North	Greensborough	St Helena
Watsonia	Montmorency	Briar Hill

Greensborough is a suburb of Melbourne, Victoria, Australia, 17 km (11 mi) north-east from Melbourne's Central Business District, located within the City of Banyule and Shire of Nillumbik local government areas. Greensborough recorded a population of 21,070 at the 2021 census.

== Etymology ==
The suburb was named after settler Edward Bernard Green, who was also the district mail contractor. Formerly it was known as Keelbundoora.

== History ==
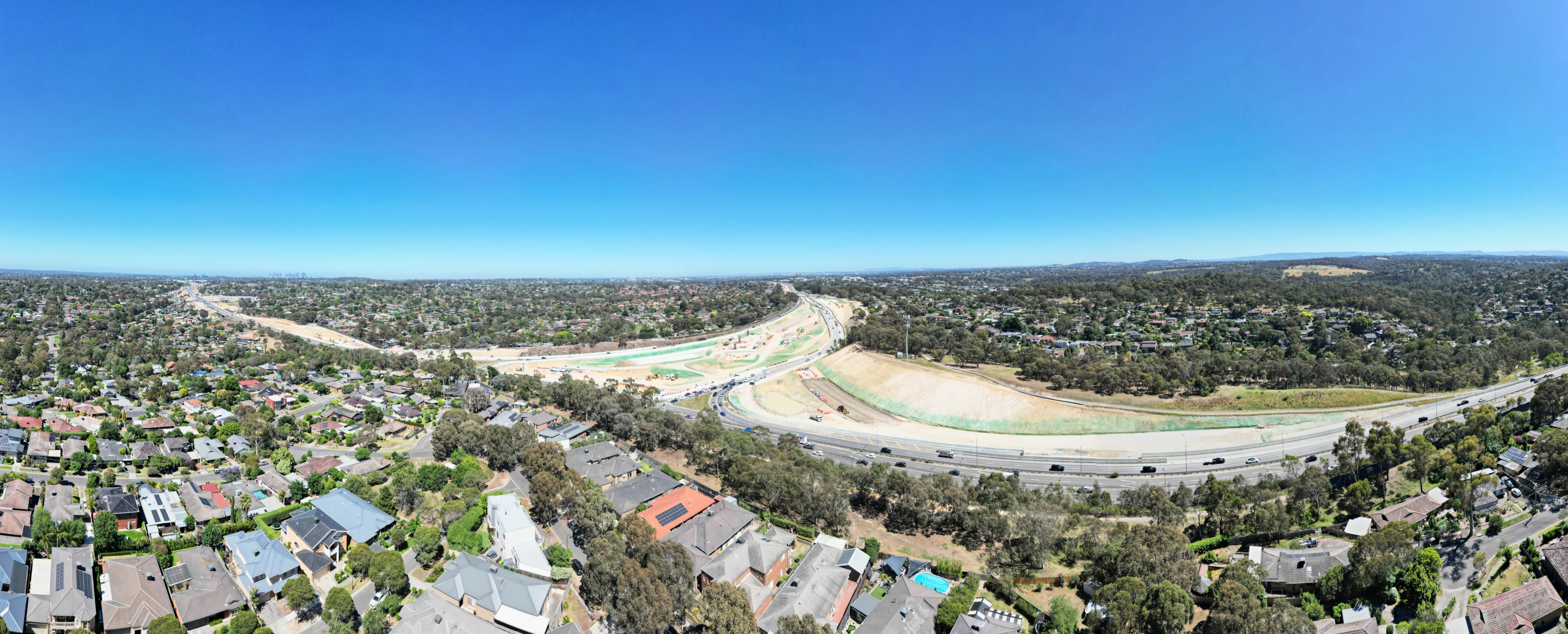
North East Link where Greensborough meets the M80

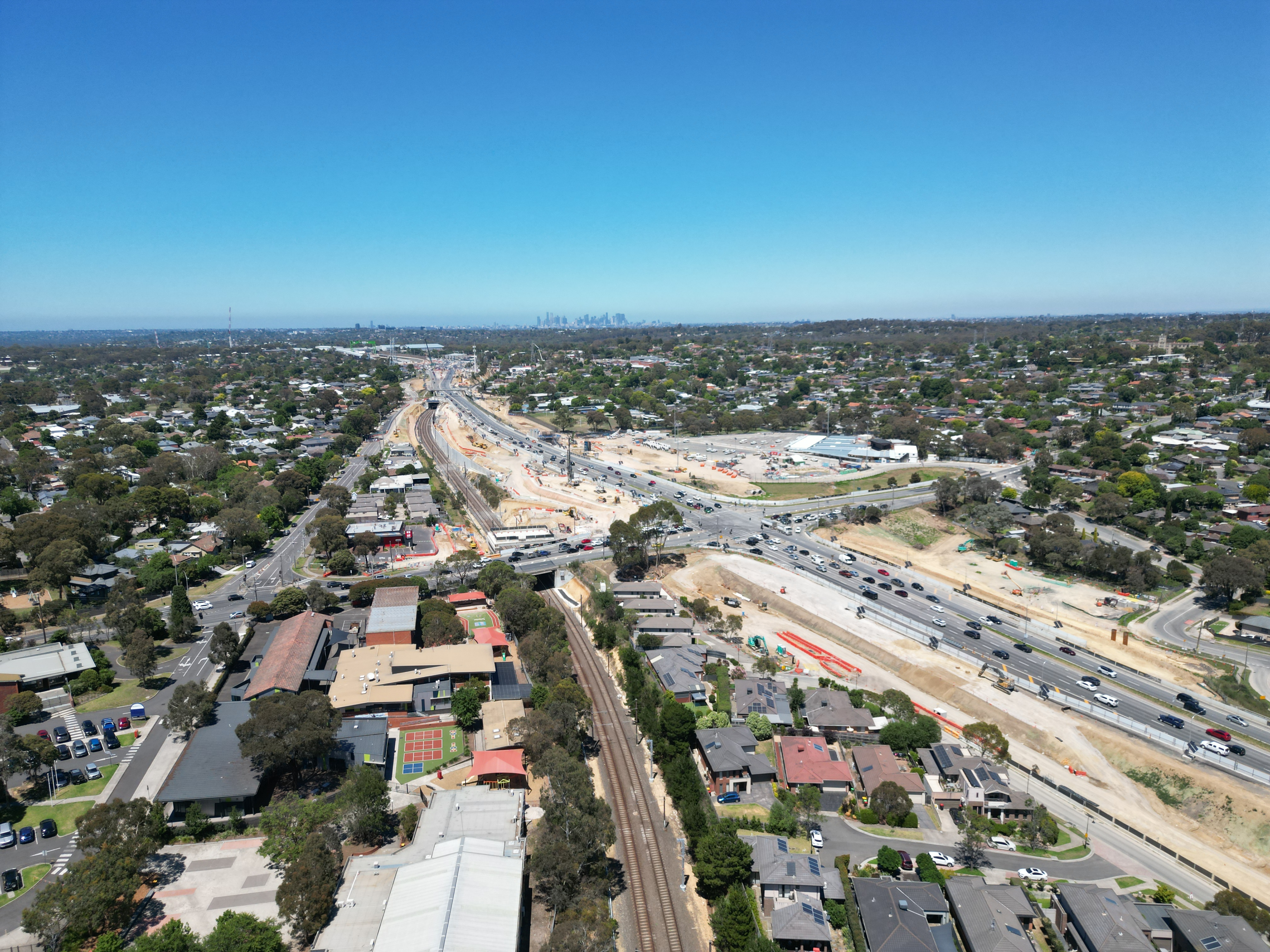
North East Link section at Greensborough facing the Melbourne skyline

In 1838, Henry Smythe, a Crown grantee, purchased 259 hectares for £544, from John Alison. The boundaries of this land included Gold Street in the North, Macorna Street in the West, Grimshaw Street in the South and Plenty River in the East. In 1841, he sold this land for £1600 to Edward Bernard Green, after whom Greensborough derived its name.

The township was established in the late 1850s, with the Post Office opening on 17 July 1858. In 1842, Charteris Lieutenant Robert Whatmough started his own orchard. Whatmough's knowledge of botany was extensive, and he had published a comprehensive book on Botany after arriving in Australia. By 1871, Greensborough had a population of 167 and by 1933 had grown to 940.

In 1845, a small private school was established. The school was a slab hut with a large fireplace that filled the end wall. A teacher, Mr. Purcell, charged two shillings per week for each of his twenty pupils. The building was destroyed by fire and another school did not re-open until 1854. There is very little information about the school or the teaching methods of Mr. Purcell.

A telegraph line connecting Greensborough and Diamond Creek with Heidelberg was completed in 1888. From 27 July 1888, a telephone link across the line was added so that telegrams could be sent or received by telephone.

During the 1880s and 1890s, Diamond Valley became popular with excursionists from inner Melbourne. Tourism increased with the advent of the railway line in the twentieth century. Greensborough was noted for its fishing (cod, perch, blackfish and eels). Another leisure pursuit that was taken up by visitors was shooting. Rabbit and hares were plentiful and the hotel provided accommodation for weekend visitors.

The Diamond Valley Football Association was formed in 1922 at Diamond Creek and initially consisted of teams from Kangaroo Ground, Eltham, Diamond Creek, Templestowe, Greensborough, and Warrandyte.

There are 13 plaques installed from the corner of Grimshaw and Henry Street, down Grimshaw and left into Main Street featuring historical information.

=== Greensborough Hotel ===
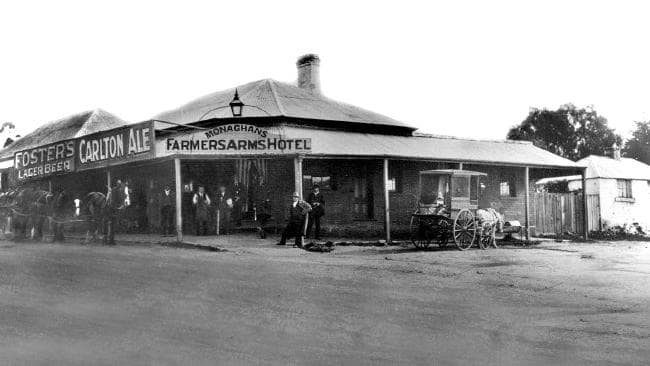
The Farmer's Arms Hotel on Main Street in 1925 before it was demolished to make way for the Greensborough Hotel

In 1864, the Greensborough Hotel, formally known as the Farmers Arms Hotel, was built by Englishman James Iredale. It served as a stopping point for travellers on their way to the goldfields further north. By law, a lit lantern was required as a sign of welcome to those needing a well-earned rest or to refresh their horses. The hotel was demolished and rebuilt in 1925 by then-owner Denis Monahan.

According to the architectural magazine Building, by 12 July 1926:

the Greensborough Hotel, by architects Sydney Smith, Ogg and Serpell, 349 Collins Street, Melbourne, has been well thought out, and the three sources of income - the bar, the dining room and the residential section, although all under easy supervision from the office, are kept absolutely distinct, so that visitors to any of these three sections are separate.

The hotel is an example of the interwar Spanish Mission style. It is one of the few early twentieth-century buildings remaining in the area and has become a landmark in the commercial centre of Greensborough.

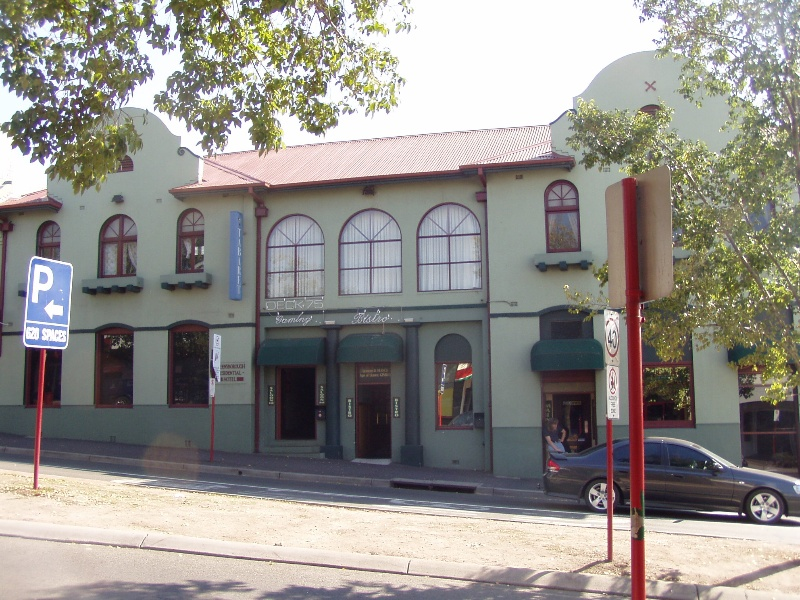
Greensborough Hotel

== Geography ==
Greensborough borders the beginning of the Green Wedge, an area of bush land that runs northward into Eltham and Diamond Creek. The Plenty River, a tributary of the Yarra River, runs through Greensborough, joining the Yarra at Templestowe.

== Government ==
In 2017, Banyule City Council moved their main offices to Greensborough from Ivanhoe as part of the wider "One Flintoff" project which included new offices and community facilities that were built above WaterMarc. The civic centre includes three level offices to accommodate 320 Council staff, community and function rooms. The centre was designed by Peddle Thorp.

The Shire of Nillumbik also operates it offices located in Greensborough at the site of the former Diamond Valley offices, next to the Diamond Valley library.

== Amenities ==
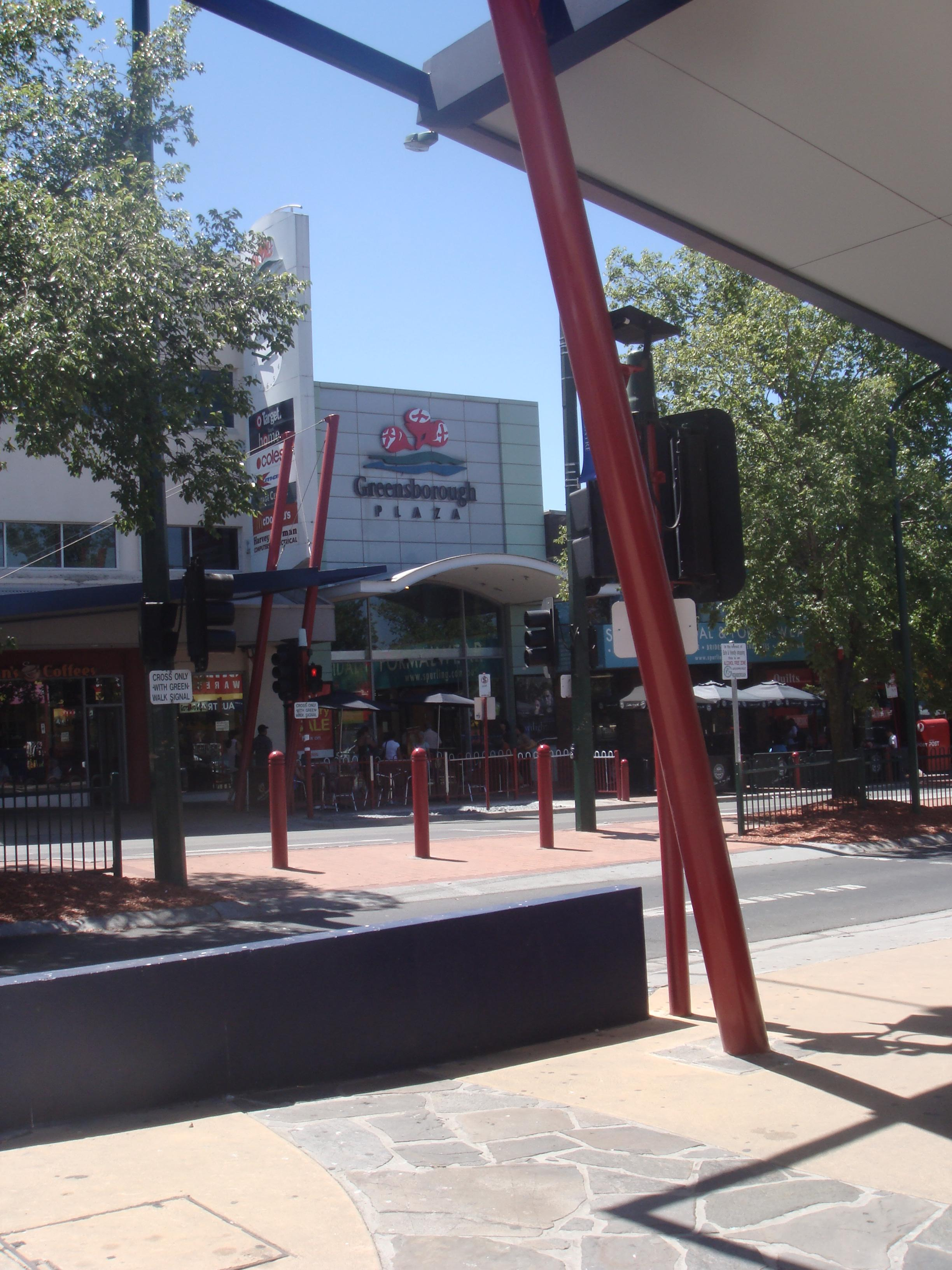
Greensborough Plaza

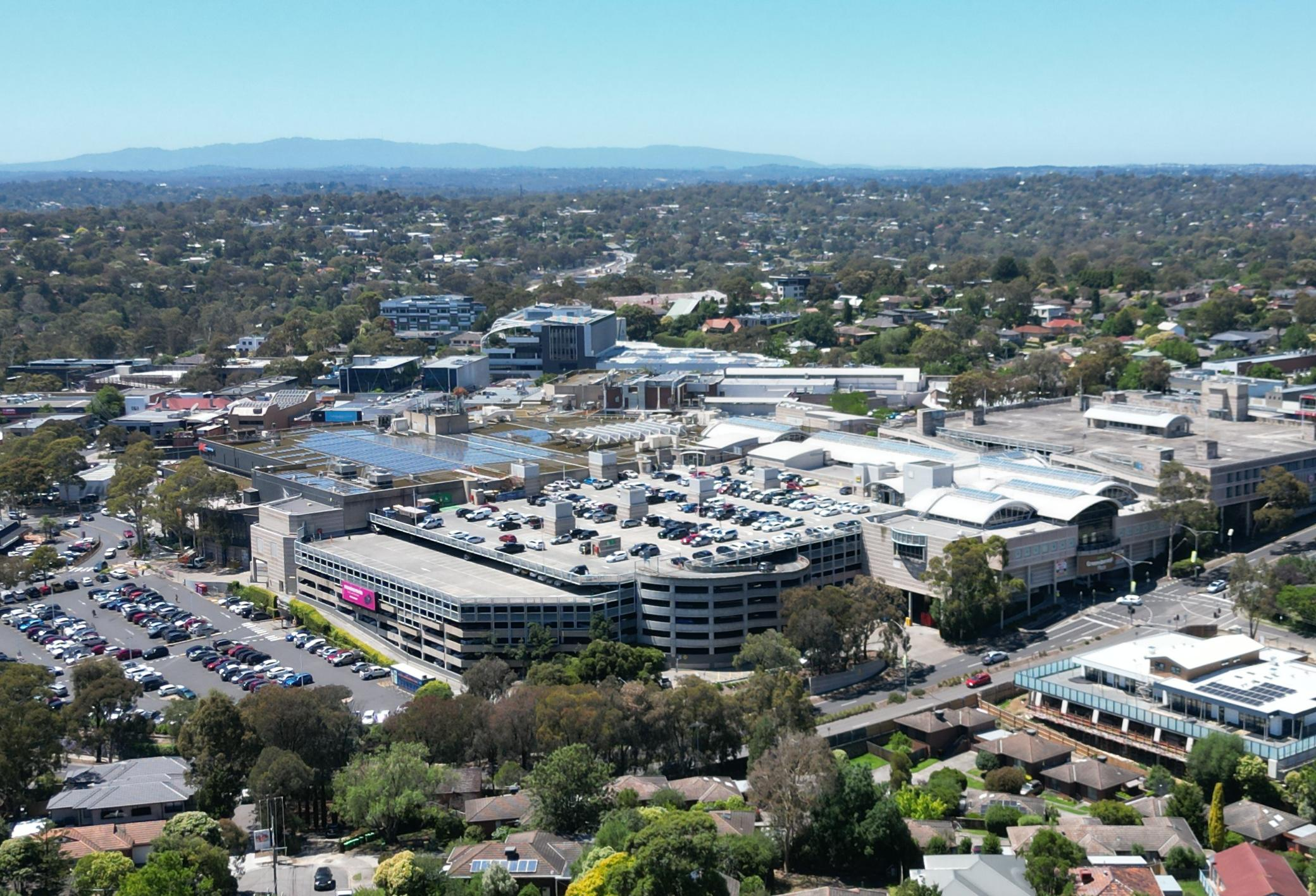
Greensborough Plaza facing Main Street with the Dandenong Ranges

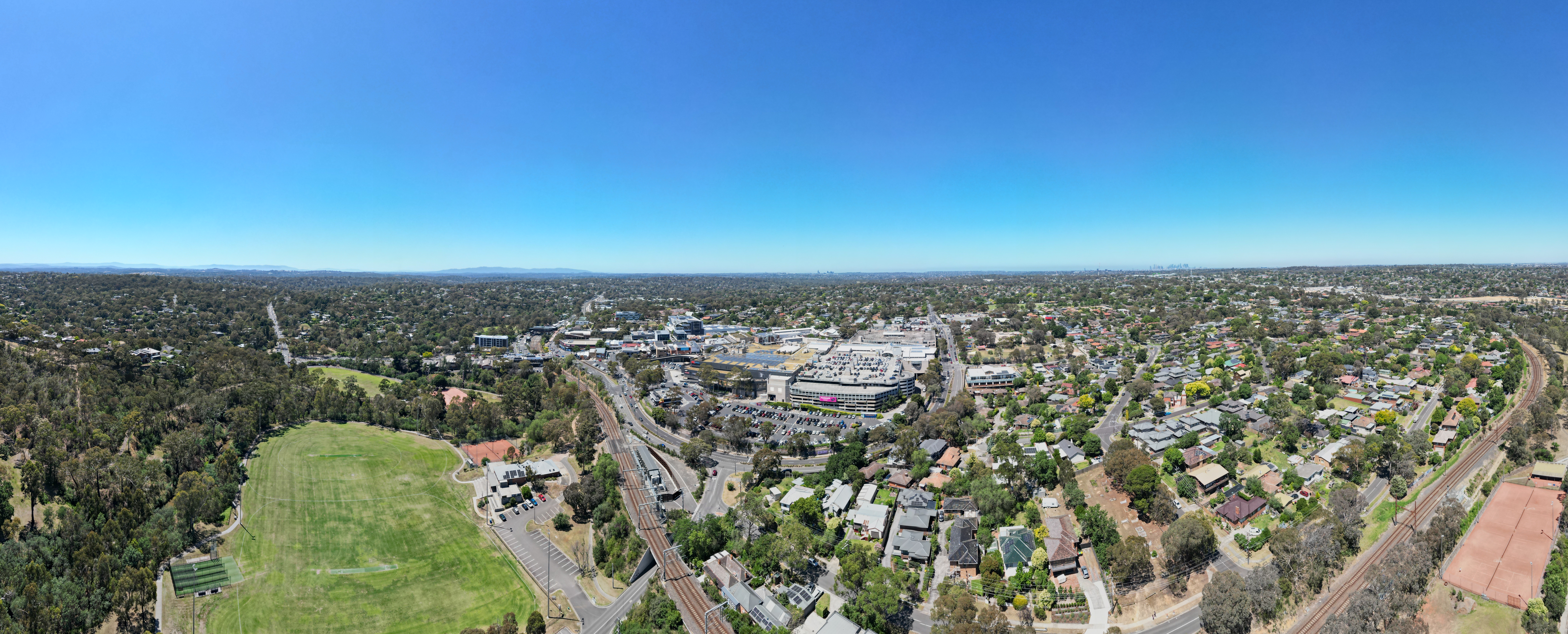
Greensborough Plaza and surrounds aerial panorama

Greensborough's main retail area is Main Street. Greensborough Plaza is a major regional shopping centre which services Melbourne's north-eastern suburbs. It was built in 1976 and has since undergone numerous renovations from a small shopping centre into a multi-storey facility.

In 2009, the Greensborough Town Centre was set to receive a major upgrade although most of the improvements were delayed or cancelled due to the 2008 financial crisis. Following this time, several new facilities were built, including a new aquatic centre, WaterMarc, a multi-level car park and Greensborough Walk, a new pedestrian promenade connecting Main Street with Watermarc.

Diamond Valley Library, Civic Drive, Greensborough is operated by Yarra Plenty Regional Library.

The Greensborough Historical Society is a local history group which aims to collect, catalogue, preserve and share the history and heritage of Greensborough.

== Transport ==
=== Road ===
Greensborough and the surrounding suburbs is serviced by a network of roads including the Greensborough Highway, which bypasses the town centre and connects to the Metropolitan Ring Road. The main street is Main Street which runs into Diamond Creek Road, while other main arterials include Para Road which runs south and Grimshaw Street which runs west.

=== Rail ===
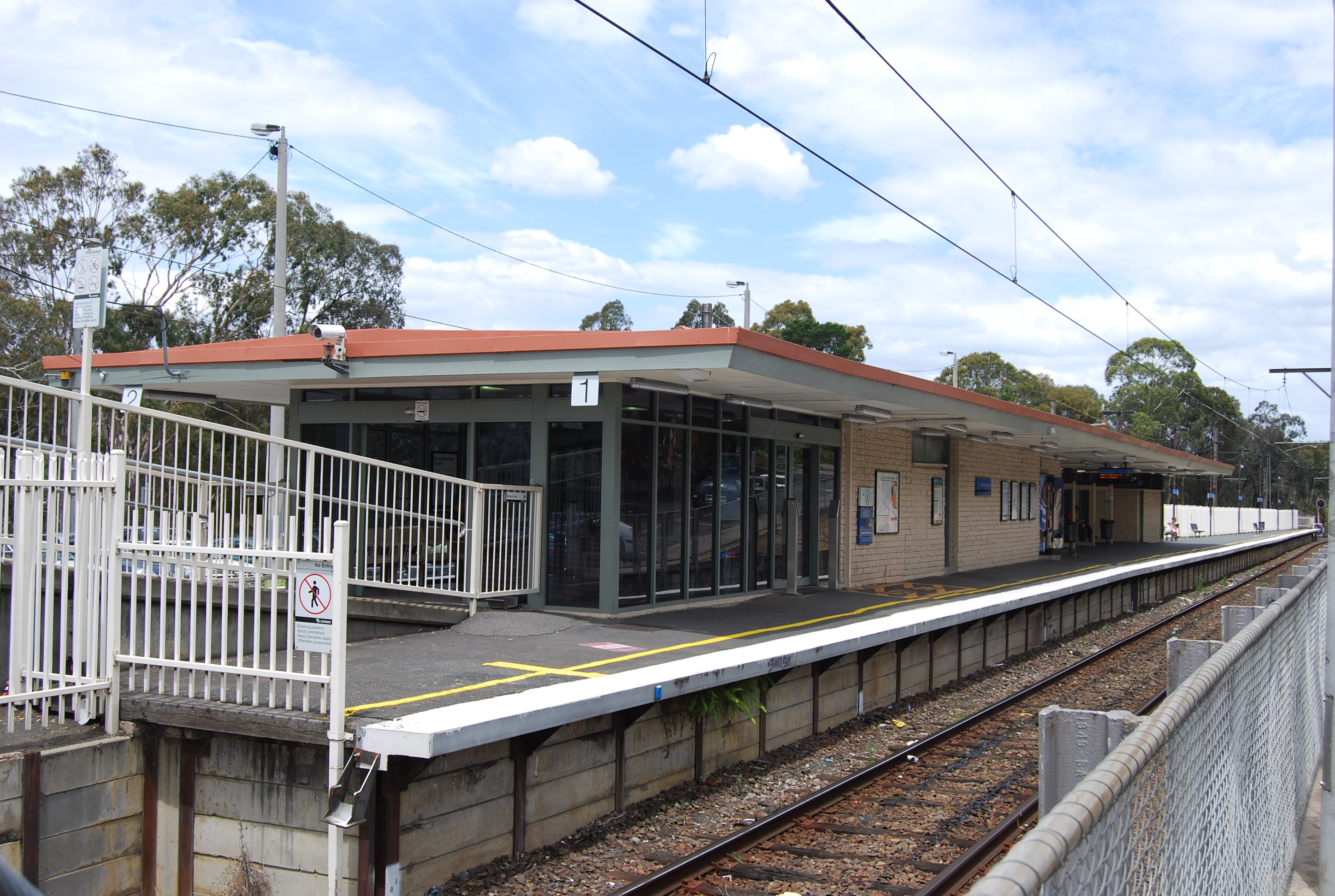
Greensborough Railway Station

Greensborough railway station services the central area of Greensborough. It is a staffed station on the Hurstbridge railway line with an island platform.

=== Bus ===
The suburb serves as a major hub for bus services for the surrounding area, with most services departing from the Main Street terminal. To this end, pedestrian links between the station and Main Street were due to be upgraded in between 2010 and 2015 as part of the Greensborough Project development to improve public transport connectivity. These links have not yet been re-proposed by either local, state or federal governments.

== Education ==
The first government primary school opened in 1875. Greensborough College is a high school with approximately 518 students, located between Greensborough and Watsonia. Greensborough is also home to several primary schools including Greensborough Primary School, located next to Greensborough Plaza and established in 1878, St Mary's Catholic Primary School, St Thomas the Apostle Catholic Primary School, Greenhills Primary School, Watsonia Heights Primary School and Apollo Parkways Primary School.

The Greensborough Melbourne Polytechnic campus reopened in 2017 aided by a $10 million state government investment after initially closing in 2013.

== Sport and recreation ==
In 1972, eight years after the Shire of Diamond Valley was established, a Civic Centre was constructed in Greensborough, serving as the headquarters for the local council. That building remained the council's home until 1994, when council amalgamations saw the creation of the Shire of Nillumbik.

In 1976, a new sports stadium, the Diamond Valley Sports and Fitness Centre, was built on land adjacent to the council offices in Greensborough.

Greensborough Football Club plays in the Northern Football League. Diamond Valley United Soccer Club also play at Partington's Flat and currently compete in Victorian State League Division 2.

Greensborough has a polyurethane athletic track at Willinda Park, which is the home of the Diamond Valley Little Athletics Centre, the largest Little Athletics Centre in Victoria with over 750 athletes, the Diamond Valley Athletic Club and the Ivanhoe Harriers.

The DVE Aquatic Club also operates out of Watermarc.

Greensborough is also home to multiple tennis clubs including; St Mary’s tennis club, which has two court locations and Greensborough tennis club. Both of which are located along the Plenty River. The Grace Valley Tennis Club was established in 1979 with en tout cas courts built in Central Park.

The Greensborough Bypass Trail is a shared use path for cyclists and pedestrians. It starts at Grimshaw Street.

== Parks, gardens and reserves ==
Andrew Yandell Reserve, Greensborough is located at 37 St. Helena Road, Greensborough, Victoria. The site occupies over six hectares of indigenous bushland maintained by the City of Banyule. The Yandell Habitat Reserve is of local historic, scientific, social, and aesthetic significance to the City of Banyule.

Willinda Park is located at the end of Nell Street, near the Plenty River Trail.

== Notable residents (current and historical) ==
- Johnny Chester, Singer songwriter
- Tracey Grimshaw, Journalist and television presenter
- Michael Hill, cricketer
- Sarah Abo, co-hosts breakfast program Today
- Karen Martini, Chef, restaurateur, writer and television presenter
- Denise Scott, comedian, actor, television and radio presenter

== See also ==
- Shire of Diamond Valley – Greensborough was previously within this former local government area.
- City of Banyule – Greensborough is currently within this local government area.
