= Electoral district of Eltham =

State electoral district of Victoria, Australia

Eltham Victoria—Legislative Assembly
- Interactive map of electoral district boundaries from the 2022 state election
- State: Victoria
- Created: 1992
- MP: Vicki Ward
- Party: Labor Party
- Namesake: Eltham
- Electors: 44,820 (2018)
- Area: 73 km^{2} (28.2 sq mi)
- Demographic: Outer metropolitan/semi-rural

The electoral district of Eltham is an electoral district of the Victorian Legislative Assembly. It is an outer metropolitan electorate and contains Eltham, Lower Plenty, Montmorency, Research, St Helena, Diamond Creek, Wattleglen as well as parts of Greensborough, Briar Hill and Kangaroo Ground.

Eltham was created prior to the 1992 election and although it had a notional Labor margin of 4.3%, it was easily won by Wayne Phillips for the Liberal Party with a swing of over 14%. Phillips held the seat before being defeated in the 'Brackslide' of 2002.

The current member is Labor MP Vicki Ward.

== Members for Eltham ==
Member	Party	Term
Wayne Phillips	Liberal	1992–2002
Steve Herbert	Labor	2002–2014
Vicki Ward	Labor	2014–present

== Election results ==
2022 Victorian state election: Eltham
Party	Candidate	Votes	%	±%
Labor	Vicki Ward	19,509	44.5	−5.3
Liberal	Jason McClintock	15,615	35.6	−1.2
Greens	Alex Grimes	5,897	13.5	+3.0
Family First	Hugh Stubley	1,118	2.5	+2.5
Animal Justice	Catriona Marshall	995	2.3	+2.3
Democratic Labour	Leila Karimi	710	1.6	−0.2
Total formal votes		43,844	96.7	+1.1
Informal votes		1,507	3.3	−1.1
Turnout		45,351	92.7	−1.5
Two-party-preferred result
Labor	Vicki Ward	25,870	59.0	−1.5
Liberal	Jason McClintock	17,974	41.0	+1.5
Labor hold		Swing	−1.5	

=== Graphical summary ===
Two-party-preferred vote results in Eltham View source data.
