= Springthorpe Estate =

Residential estate in Macleod, Melbourne

Coordinates: 37°42′59″S 145°03′47″E

Logo of the Springthorpe Estate in Macleod, Victoria, Australia

The Springthorpe Estate, often shortened to Springthorpe, is a residential housing estate with an area of approximately 50 hectares located in the Melbourne suburb of Macleod in Victoria, Australia. It is surrounded by the Dunvegan Estate and Cherry Street Grasslands to the east, Gresswell Forest Nature Conservation Reserve to the north, La Trobe University to the west and La Trobe University and Macleod Estate to the south.

== History ==
Map of the Springthorpe Estate in Macleod, Victoria, Australia.

The Springthorpe Estate traces its origins to the colonial land sales in the Colony of Victoria, when Crown Portions 9 and 10 in the Parish of Keelbundoora, County of Burke (covering modern-day Macleod and Bundoora) were sold to Neil McLean on 5 February 1840 for £816. After purchase, Neil McLean named both properties ‘Strathallan’. McLean's brother, Malcolm, took over the land in 1842, but then returned to Scotland with his wife and children in the late 1850s, leaving an agent in control. Much of the flatter land was cleared of vegetation for farming aside from some of the large river red gums (Eucalyptus camaldulensis). The agent leased portions of the land to several tenant farmers for grazing, dairying, and other activities.

Charles Henry James MLC purchased the Strathallan estate from the McLean family in December 1888 for £234,000 but his purchase was subject to protracted legal battles and disputes that continued until 1891, by which time Mr. James was bankrupt.

A large part of the Strathallan Estate east of Plenty Road (covering most of Crown Porton 10) was subsequently acquired by the Crown in 1907 for the establishment of the Mont Park Asylum, which covered a substantial part of what is now the Springthorpe Estate.

Ownership of the remaining portion of the Strathallan property (covering all of Crown Portion 9 and a little of Crown Portion 10 to the east of modern-day Springthorpe Estate) then transferred to the Commercial Bank of Australia in 1902.

The Commercial Bank of Australia subdivided the land into three portions. On 18 December 1908, the bank sold the northernmost and central sections to Edith Jessie Macleod for £6000, or approximately £15 per acre. The press of the time credited Edith Macleod's husband, Malcolm Anderson Macleod, with owning the land but this was not the case. (The southern portion of the bank's holding was sold to Michael Le Grand in 1911 and covers modern-day Golf Links Estate and Macleod Estate). The central section, which consisted of a thin strip of land measuring 31.51 hectares was sold to the State Government of Victoria on 19 December 1908 for £2375, or £30 per acre to enable the construction of a branch railway line from the Hurstbridge railway to the neighbouring asylum.

The timing and methods by which the strip of land was acquired for the railway line indicates likely corruption. The land transfer was examined as part of the 1909 Royal Commission on the Acquisition of Certain Estates by Sir Thomas Bent. The enquiry found that the purchase price was excessive. Engineers then discovered that the land was too steep to accommodate the proposed railway line, so a land swap had to be arranged between Edith Macleod and the Crown for some of her remaining land holdings nearby. The land swap was enabled by the Mont Park Land Act 1910 (Vic.), which enabled the construction of the Mont Park branch line from Macleod station to the asylum in a north-westerly direction.

Map showing the layout of the Mont Park asylum complex in the 1990s, with institution names overlaid, prior to closure.

Over successive decades, several institutions were variously established on the asylum lands:

- Mont Park Hospital
- Macleod Repatriation Hospital (administered by the Commonwealth)
- Gresswell Rehabilitation Centre
- Plenty Hospital

Many of these institutions were subsequently merged into North Eastern Metropolitan Psychiatric Services (NEMPS) in 1991, before being progressively closed-down in the 1990s. At this time, the Urban Land Authority took control of the land on behalf of the State Government in order to have it sold for residential subdivision. Some of the land was transferred to La Trobe University or set aside for reserves.

In 1998, developer Urban Pacific Pty. Ltd. won the State Government tender to redevelop the land as a housing estate in a project worth $180 million.

== Land sales ==
Land sales commenced in 2003 and continued for five years whilst the estate was developed in 14 stages.

== Other features ==
The Springthorpe Estate contains several community assets, including:

- Cascade Reserve
- Ernest Jones Reserve
- Village Common Reserve
- Springthorpe Country Club
- Springthorpe Retirement Village
- Various buildings belonging to La Trobe University

== Etymology ==
The name Springthorpe commemorates Dr. John Springthorpe of the Mont Park Hospital.
