= Dunvegan Estate =

Residential estate in Macleod, Melbourne

Coordinates: 37°43′07″S 145°04′12″E

The Dunvegan Estate is a residential housing estate with an area of approximately 50 hectares located in the Melbourne suburb of Macleod in Victoria, Australia. It is surrounded by the Hurstbridge Railway line to the east, Gresswell Forest Nature Conservation Reserve to the north, Springthorpe Estate and Cherry Street Grasslands to the west and the Macleod (Victoria Cross) Estate to the south.

== History ==
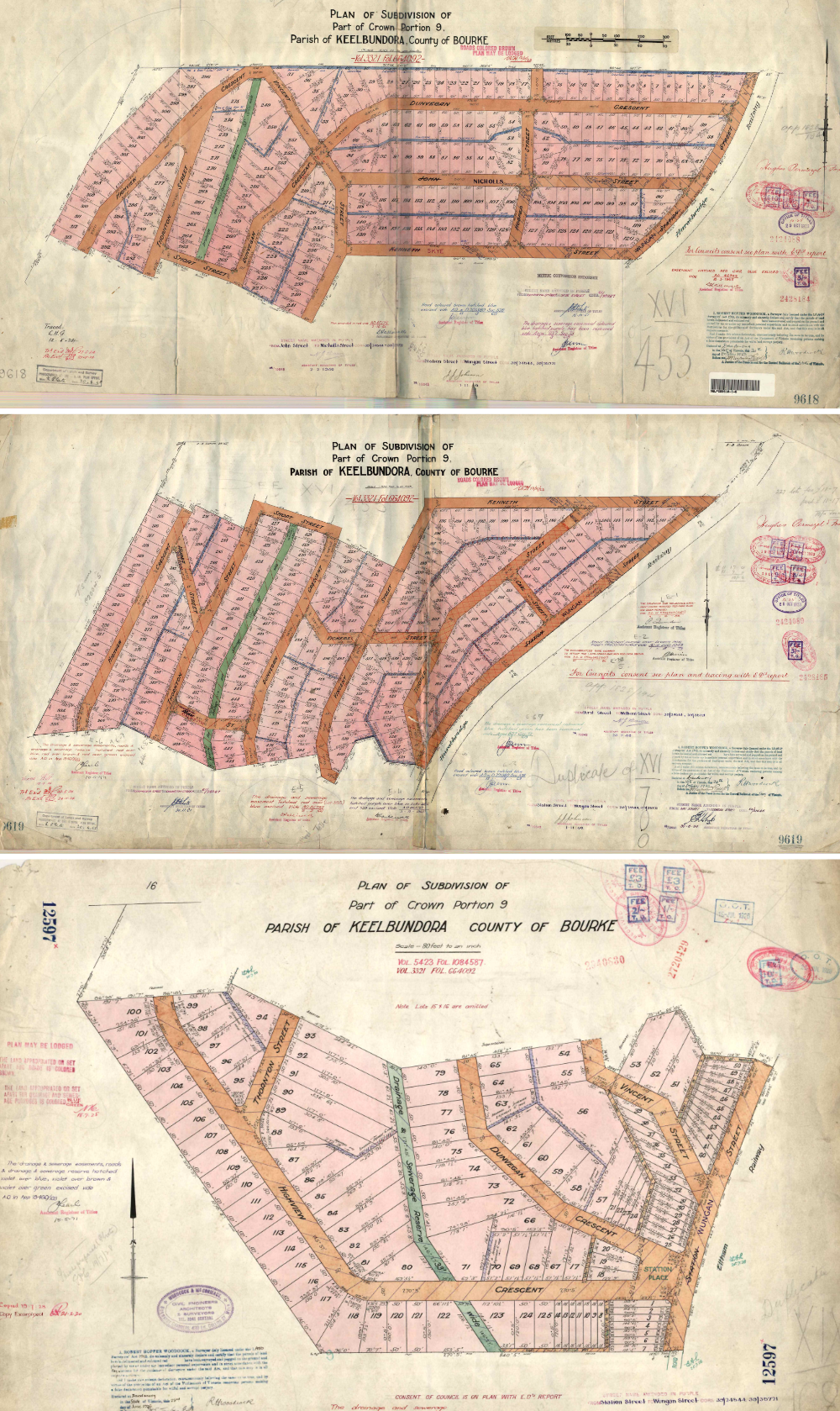
The original survey plans for the Dunvegan Estate from 1923 by Robert Hopper Woodcock.

The Dunvegan Estate traces its origins to the colonial land sales in the Colony of Victoria, when Crown Portions 9 and 10 in the Parish of Keelbundoora, County of Burke (covering modern-day Macleod and Bundoora) were sold to Neil McLean on 5 February 1840 for £816. After purchase, Neil McLean named both properties 'Strathallan'. McLean's brother, Malcolm, took over the land in 1842, but then returned to Scotland with his wife and children in the late 1850s, leaving an agent in control. Much of the flatter land was cleared of vegetation for farming aside from some of the large river red gums (Eucalyptus camaldulensis). The agent leased portions of the land to several tenant farmers for grazing, dairying, and other activities.

Charles Henry James MLC purchased the Strathallan estate from the McLean family in December 1888 for £234,000 but his purchase was subject to protracted legal battles and disputes that continued until 1891, by which time Mr. James was bankrupt. Ownership of a large portion of the property (covering all of Crown Portion 9 and a little of Crown Portion 10) then transferred to the Commercial Bank of Australia in 1902.

The Commercial Bank of Australia subdivided the land into three portions. On 18 December 1908, the bank sold the northernmost and central sections to Edith Jessie Macleod for £6000, or approximately £15 per acre. The press of the time credited Edith Macleod's husband, Malcolm Anderson Macleod, with owning the land but this was not the case. (The southern portion of the bank's holding was told to Michael Le Grand in 1911). The central section, which consisted of a thin strip of land measuring 31.51 hectares was sold to the State Government of Victoria on 19 December 1908 for £2375, or £30 per acre to enable the construction of a branch railway line from the Hurstbridge railway to the neighbouring Mont Park asylum.

The timing and methods by which the strip of land was acquired for the railway line indicates likely corruption. The land transfer was examined as part of the 1909 Royal Commission on the Acquisition of Certain Estates by Sir Thomas Bent. The enquiry found that the purchase price was excessive. Engineers then discovered that the land was too steep to accommodate the proposed railway line, so a land swap had to be arranged between Edith Macleod and the Crown for some of her remaining land holdings nearby. The land swap was enabled by the Mont Park Land Act 1910 (Vic.), which enabled the construction of the Mont Park branch line from Macleod station to the asylum in a north-westerly direction.

Edith Macleod's remaining land on the west of the Hurstbridge railway line was then bordered to the south, west and north by Mont Park Asylum lands with only a narrow access point at Devonshire Road in modern-day Watsonia. This area was surveyed in 1923 by Robert Hopper Woodcock to create the "Dunvegan Estate".

Sales of land in the first release commenced in 1924. Land in the second release went on sale in 1928 and was marketed as the "Macleod Railway Estate". Both residential lots and shop sites were offered for sale in the estate without any roads or services, including water, sewerage, gas, electricity or telephony. There was no direct access to any existing shops or the Macleod railway station. Consequently, there was no development on the estate between 1924 and the late 1950s.

== Replanning ==
The final layout of the Dunvegan Estate in the 1980s after replanning.

In 1954, the Housing Commission of Victoria started to actively purchase lots in the Dunvegan Estate with a view to developing the whole area. Properties were acquired by private negotiation. The 1954-5 Annual Report for the Housing Commission notes that 192 lots were acquired in Macleod that year. A further 18 lots was acquired in 1955–6, 58 in 1956–7, 3 in 1957-8 and 3 in 1958–59.

The City of Heidelberg council also took an interest in the development of the estate and voted in 1959 to re-plan the area after a few residences were constructed. In 1960, the council voted to undertake the re-planning and redevelopment of the estate itself. Local resident and qualified town planner Henry (Harry) Pottage was commissioned to develop the scheme.

Part of Pottage's scheme involved the compulsory acquisition of properties to allow for road realignments. This led to friction between council and the Housing Commission (who owned many of the affected properties) about the scope of the project. To resolve the tension, the City of Heidelberg and the Housing Commission agreed to partition the estate into two areas of responsibility; the City of Heidelberg would re-plan the northern section (north of Highview Crescent and Skye Street) and the Housing Commission would redevelop the southern section.

The City of Heidelberg realigned Wungan Street away from the railway line, created Iona Court and redirected Hooper, Nicholls and Skye Streets as part of its re-planning works in the north. In the southern section, the Housing Commission negotiated with the Mont Park Hospital to transfer Crown land to enable to connection of Wungan Street to Cherry Street and thus provide better access to the estate. These negotiations ultimately lead to the establishment of the Harry Pottage Memorial Reserve and the Macleod Recreation and Fitness Centre.

== Land Sales ==
On 17 November 1969, following the realignment of Wungan, Nicholls and Skye Streets, the City of Heidelberg sold 24 of its lots to the Housing Commission for $38,200. (Between 1974 and 1979, the Housing Commission sold all of these lots; some to low-income families and the rest on the open market). In 1971, the City of Heidelberg sold most of its remaining lots to L.G. & F.J. Nickson Pty. Ltd. (Nickson Homes) who constructed houses on them from 1972.

In the southern section, the Housing Commission commenced residential land sales in 1976. In March that year, the Commission sought applications from people who wished to purchase one of 32 lots for $12,000 but who earned less than $200 per week (exclusive of overtime). Purchasers would enter into a covenant that they would build within three years and interest would be charged at 8.5% per annum. Separately on 24 April 1976, a private estate agent conducted an auction of 35 of the Housing Commission's lots on the open market for an average of $18,672 with the highest price being $19,400 for one of the lots. This generated significant public controversy.

Subsequently, the Housing Commission sold most of the residential lots in the Dunvegan Estate on the private market between 1976 and 1986 with a small number of lots being retained for the construction of public housing.

In 1982, the Housing Commission (which was now known as the Ministry of Housing) proposed building 47 "cluster housing" units in the centre of the estate. There was widespread concern from residents about this proposal. After extensive consultation the Ministry of Housing abandoned the proposal, choosing instead to scatter additional public housing lots throughout the estate.
