= Strathallan Estate =

Residential estate in Macleod, Melbourne

Coordinates: 7°43′16″S 145°04′37″E

Strathallan Estate is a residential housing estate with an area of approximately 70 hectares located in the Melbourne suburb of Macleod in Victoria, Australia. It is bounded by the Hurstrbridge railway line to the west, Wattle Drive to the north, Greensborough Highway to the east and the Golf Links Estate to the south.

== History ==
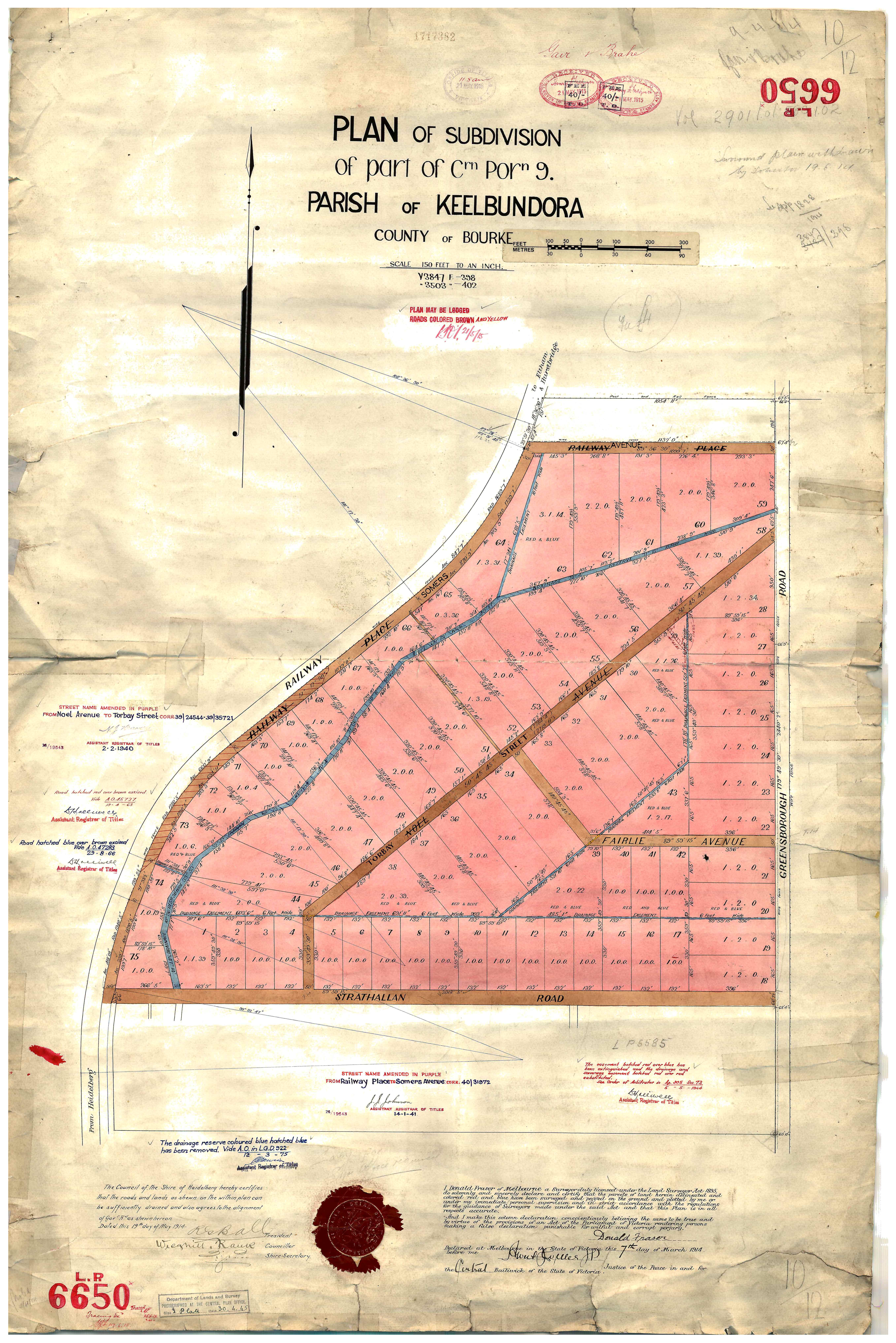
The original plan of subdivision for Part 2 of the Strathallan Estate in Macleod, Victoria, Australia.

The Strathallan Estate traces its origins to the colonial land sales in the Colony of Victoria, when Crown Portions 9 and 10 in the Parish of Keelbundoora, County of Burke (covering modern-day Macleod and Bundoora) were sold to Neil McLean on 5 February 1840 for £816. After purchase, Neil McLean named both properties ‘Strathallan’. McLean's brother, Malcolm, took over the land in 1842, but then returned to Scotland with his wife and children in the late 1850s, leaving an agent in control. Much of the flatter land was cleared of vegetation for farming aside from some of the large river red gums (Eucalyptus camaldulensis). The agent leased portions of the land to several tenant farmers for grazing, dairying, and other activities.

Charles Henry James MLC purchased the Strathallan estate from the McLean family in December 1888 for £234,000 but his purchase was subject to protracted legal battles and disputes that continued until 1891, by which time Mr. James was bankrupt. Ownership of a large portion of the property (covering all of Crown Portion 9 and a little of Crown Portion 10) then transferred to the Commercial Bank of Australia in 1902.

The Commercial Bank of Australia subdivided the land into three portions. On 18 December 1908, the bank sold the northernmost and central sections to Edith Jessie Macleod for £6000, or approximately £15 per acre. The press of the time credited Edith Macleod's husband, Malcolm Anderson Macleod, with owning the land but this was not the case. (The southern portion of the bank's holding was told to Michael Le Grand in 1911). The central section, which consisted of a thin strip of land measuring 31.51 hectares was sold to the State Government of Victoria on 19 December 1908 for £2375, or £30 per acre to enable the construction of a branch railway line from the Hurstrbridge railway to the neighbouring Mont Park asylum.

The timing and methods by which the strip of land was acquired for the railway line indicates likely corruption. The land transfer was examined as part of the 1909 Royal Commission on the Acquisition of Certain Estates by Sir Thomas Bent. The enquiry found that the purchase price was excessive. Engineers then discovered that the land was too steep to accommodate the proposed railway line, so a land swap had to be arranged between Edith Macleod and the Crown for some of her remaining land holdings nearby. The land swap was enabled by the Mont Park Land Act 1910 (Vic.), which enabled the construction of the Mont Park branch line from Macleod station to the asylum in a north-westerly direction.

== Land Sales ==
A map of a portion of Macleod showing Part 1 (green) and Part 2 (blue) of the Strathallan Estate.

Lots in the Strathallan Estate were sold in two stages:

- Part 1 consisted of residential-sized blocks, typically measuring 1000 square metres in area. This is the area south of Strathallan Road exchanged under the Mont Park Land Act 1910 (Vic.). This area was surveyed by Henry Vine Champion in 1910 and lots were offered for sale later that year.
- Part 2 was surveyed by Donald Fraser and consisted of larger 1- or 2-acre lots that went on sale from 1913. Land sales were initially slow, but many bundles of lots were purchased that were subsequently subdivided into smaller residential estates.

Edith Macleod was unable to sell some of the lots in Strathallan Estate Part 2. Some of these were re-surveyed and sold as smaller residential lots in the Skye Estate (1925) or Portree Estate (1926).

== Other Features ==
The Strathallan Estate contains several community assets, current and former, including:

- Macleod Primary School (now closed and merged with Macleod Secondary College to create Macleod College)
- Macleod College
- Winsor Reserve
- Regis Macleod Aged-Care Home

== Etymology ==
The naming of the Strathallan Estate is unrelated the nearby Strathalan homestead (note the different spelling) after which the Baptcare Strathalan Aged-Care Homes are named.
