= Golf Links Estate =

Residential estate in Macleod, Melbourne

Coordinates: 37°43′44″S 145°04′27″E

The Golf Links Estate is a residential housing estate with an area of approximately 59 hectares located in the Melbourne suburb of Macleod in Victoria, Australia. It is bounded by the Hurstrbridge railway line to the west, Strathallan Estate to the north, Greensborough Highway to the east and the suburb of Rosanna to the south.

== History ==
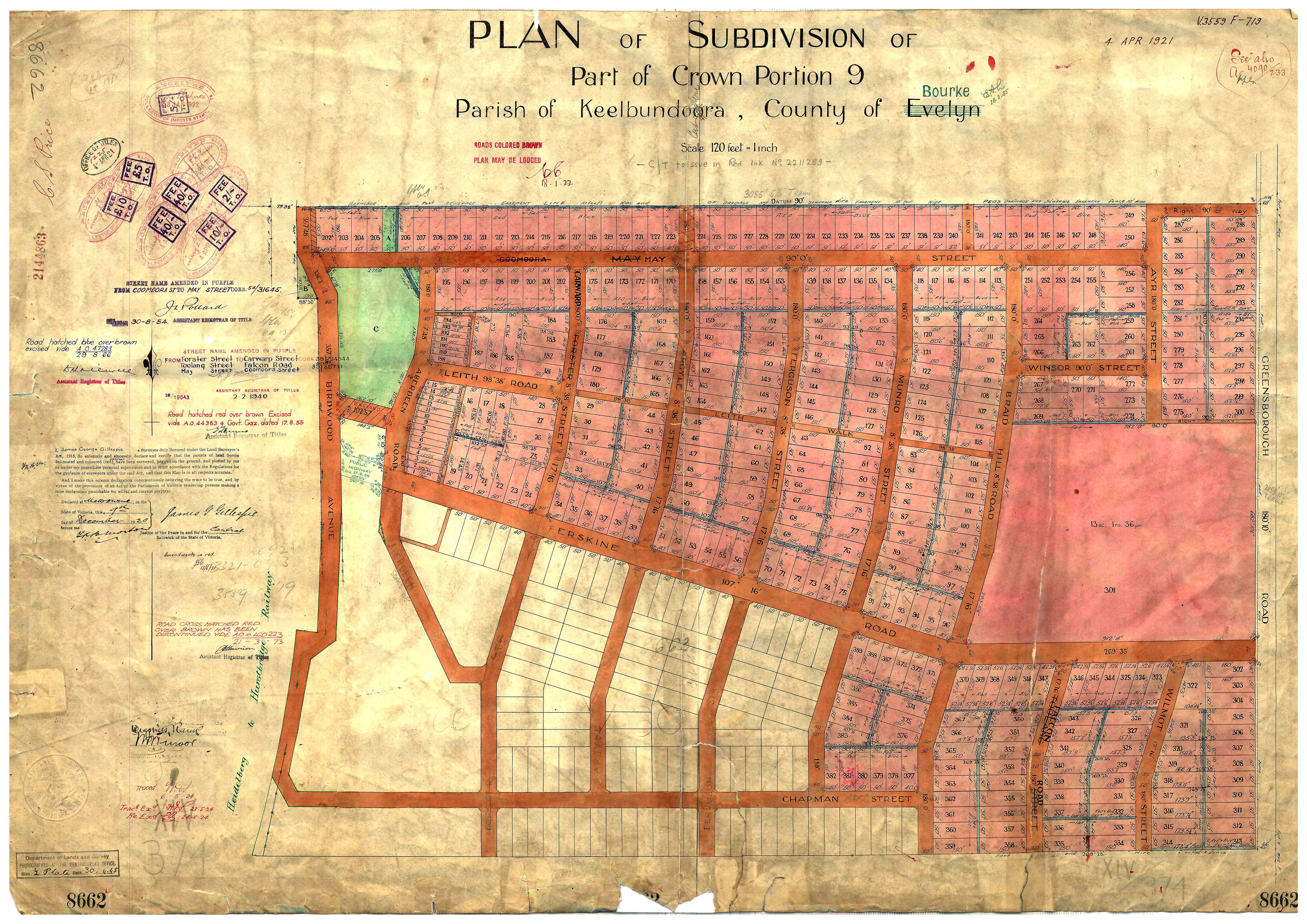
Lodged Plan for part of the Golf Links Estate in Macleod, Victoria, Australia by James George Gillespie.

The Golf Links Estate traces its origins to the colonial land sales in the Colony of Victoria, when Crown Portions 9 and 10 in the Parish of Keelbundoora, County of Burke (covering modern-day Macleod and Bundoora) were sold to Neil McLean on 5 February 1840 for £816. After purchase, Neil McLean named both properties ‘Strathallan’. McLean's brother, Malcolm, took over the land in 1842, but then returned to Scotland with his wife and children in the late 1850s, leaving an agent in control. Much of the flatter land was cleared of vegetation for farming aside from some of the large river red gums (Eucalyptus camaldulensis). The agent leased portions of the land to several tenant farmers for grazing, dairying, and other activities.

Charles Henry James MLC purchased the Strathallan estate from the McLean family in December 1888 for £234,000 but his purchase was subject to protracted legal battles and disputes that continued until 1891, by which time Mr. James was bankrupt. Ownership of a large portion of the property (covering all of Crown Portion 9 and a little of Crown Portion 10) then transferred to the Commercial Bank of Australia in 1902.

The Commercial Bank of Australia subdivided the land into three portions. On 18 December 1908, the bank sold the northernmost and central sections to Edith Jessie Macleod. The southern portion of the bank's holding was sold to Michael Le Grand in 1911.

Le Grand died on 12 July 1914 and bequeathed his estate to his wife Annie Le Grand. She obtained title in 1916. In 1919, Le Grand sold her remaining interests to the Freehold Assets Company Limited, who organised to have the area surveyed for subdivision into the Golf Links Estate. The surveyor was James George Gillespie.

The estate is notable because of the large area of land that the developers set-aside for parks and recreation around the Macleod railway station.

== Land sales ==
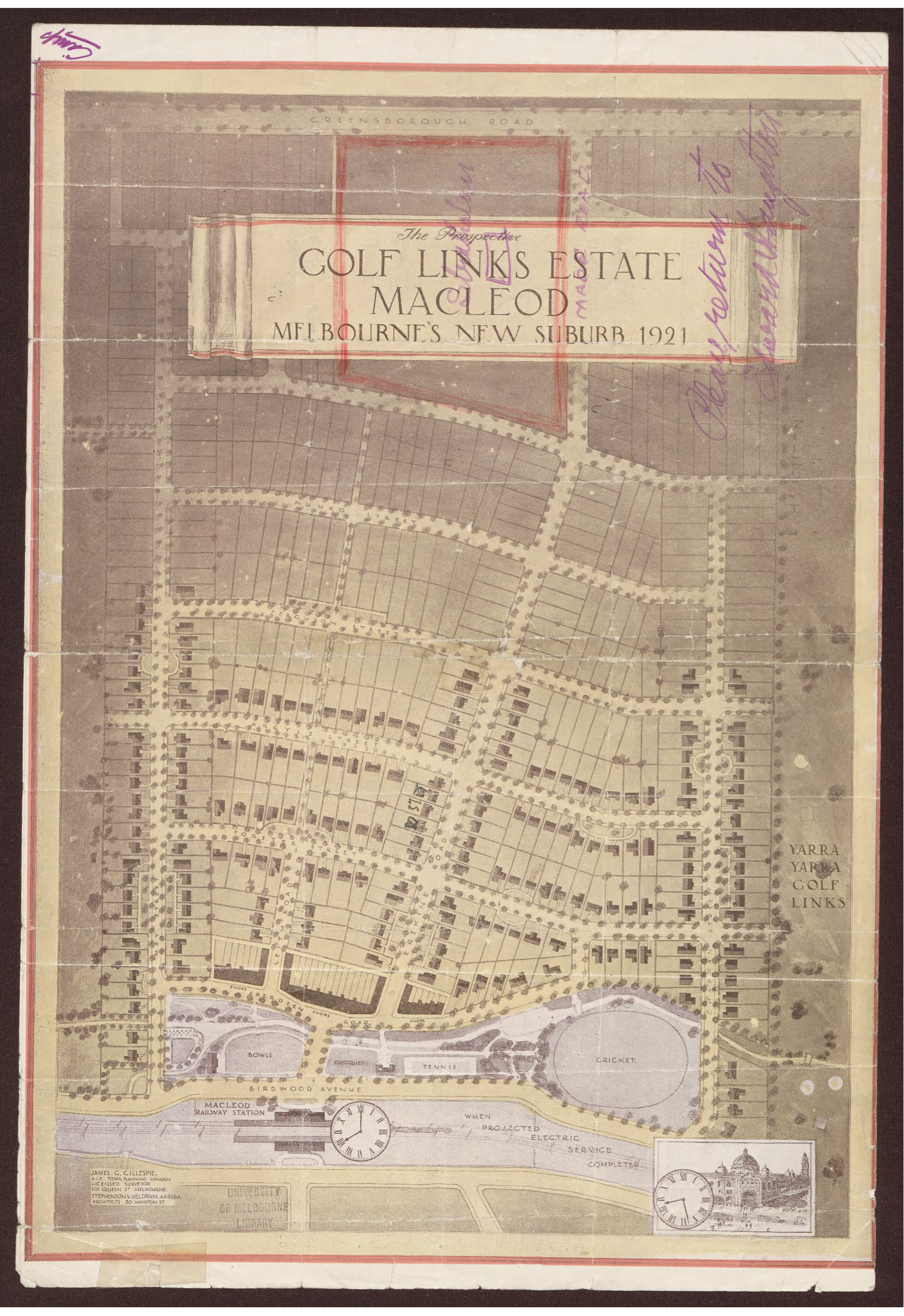
Advertising brochure for Golf Links Estate in Macleod (1921)

Lots in the Golf Links Estate were first advertised for sale in 1921 and were marketed by Coghill & Haughton.

The estate included several hundred residential lots as well as two-dozen shop sites, situated around parklands adjacent to the Macleod railway station. This area became Macleod Park and the shops became the Macleod Village Shopping Centre.

== Other features ==
The Golf Links Estate contains several community assets, current and former, including:

- Macleod Park
- Macleod Hall
- Macleod Preschool
- The eastern entrance to the Macleod station
- Strathalan Aged Care Home
- A portion of Macleod College
- A portion of Rosanna Park

== Etymology ==
The Golf Links Estate is named after the former Rosanna Golf Links that originally bordered the south of the estate. This area is now known as Rosanna Park.
