= Royal Australian Corps of Signals =

- Active: 1901 – present
- Country: Australia
- Allegiance: Australian Army
- Branch: Australian Regular Army
- Type: Field army
- Role: Military communications
- Size: 6 regular regiments
- Mottos: Latin: Certa Cito; Swift and Sure
- Colors: Light blue, over dark blue, over green.
- March: Combination of "Begone Dull Care" and "Click Go The Shears" (quick march), "Princess Royal" (slow march)
- Engagements: RASigs are not awarded battle honours. However, they were awarded the Meritorious Unit Citation FCU Cambodia.

Commanders
- Colonel-in-Chief: Anne, Princess Royal

The Royal Australian Corps of Signals (RASigs) is one of the 'arms' (combat support corps) of the Australian Army. It is responsible for installing, maintaining, and operating all types of telecommunications equipment and information systems. The motto of the Signals Corps is Certa Cito and is translated as 'Swift and Sure', signifying the aim of the signal service – that communication be carried out with maximum speed and certainty. Like their British counterparts, the Royal Australian Corps of Signals' flag and hat badge feature Mercury, the winged messenger of the gods, affectionately referred to by members of the corps as "Jimmy" (the origin dates back to the merge with Engineers when the Engineer's band's Drum Major had a "Jimmy" on his staff).

Modern Army command and control systems demand reliable, high-speed transfer of large volumes of data. The communications systems provided by Signals must keep pace with modern information technology. The control of the electromagnetic spectrum offers a decisive advantage in modern warfare and Electronic Warfare, listening to or interfering with enemy electronic transmissions, is a critical contribution by the Signals Corps to the Army's combat capability.

On the battlefield, Signals provides commanders with the means of controlling the battle using road and air dispatch services, radio, microwave, and satellite links. A high technology computer switched digital network, capable of providing a high quality, high capacity, secure communications network is being introduced.

The Corps has recently taken over the responsibility for Army Information Systems. Signal Corps personnel now control large integrated information systems and are responsible for the installation and operation of local area networks using state-of-the-art computer equipment.

Specialist roles in the Corps include: Communication System Operator (known in the Corps as "Operators"), Telecommunications Technician (known as "Techs" or "Techies"), Electronic Warfare Operator (known as "Bears" from being primarily posted to a base near Cabarlah (Koala), Queensland) and Information Systems Technician (known as "Geeks"). Members of the 152nd Signals Squadron are commonly called "chooks" by SASR troops.

== History ==
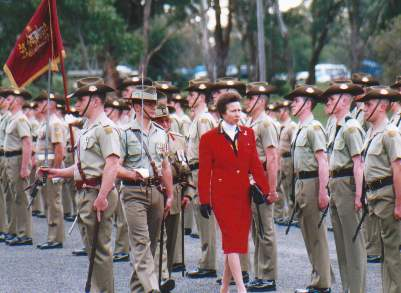
Princess Anne passes behind The Princess Anne Banner at the 75th anniversary parade for the Royal Australian Corps of Signals

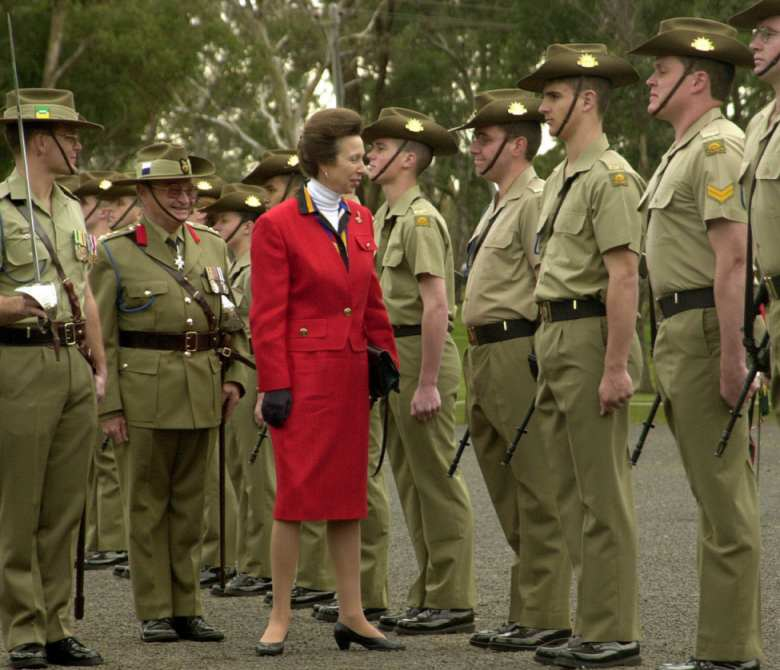
Princess Anne inspects troops at the 75th anniversary parade for the Royal Australian Corps of Signals

The Princess Anne Banner

The Princess Anne Banner

Australia has the unique distinction of having had the first regularly formed signal unit in the British Empire. The Corps began in 1869 as a small "torpedo and signals corp", located in New South Wales and Victoria. These units existed until 1882 when they were disbanded. In 1885, a "signalling corps", composed of one officer and twelve other ranks, was created in South Australia and remained active until 1901.

After the inception of the Commonwealth Forces, an "Australian Corps of Signallers" was formed on 12 January 1906. This day is recognised as the Signal Corps' birthday. The Corps remained as a self-contained unit until 1911 when it was merged with Australian Engineers.

On 1 January 1925, the Australian Corps of Signals was formed and all Signals units were separated from the Australian Corps of Engineers.

At the conclusion of World War II, a silver salver was presented to the Australian Corps of Signals by Princess Mary as a memento of the co-operation between the Royal Corps of Signals and the Australian Corps of Signals throughout the Second World War.

On 10 November 1948, His Majesty King George VI conferred the title "Royal" on the Australian Corps of Signals. The day is recognised a "Corps Day", and commemorative functions are held on, or as near as possible to, 10 November each year.

Approval was given by Her Royal Highness, Princess Anne, The Princess Royal, the Signals Corps' Colonel-in-Chief, on 10 September 1980 for the Corps to carry a banner bearing her Cipher. The banner is known as "The Princess Anne Banner", and was presented to the Signals Corps by the then Governor-General, The Right Honourable Sir Ninian Stephen on 29 November 1986.

On 5 July 2000, a parade was held for her Royal Highness, Princess Anne, The Princess Royal at Simpson Barracks, Watsonia, marking the 75th anniversary of the Corps.

In the Australia Day Honours List, 2014. The FCU Cambodia was awarded the Meritorious Unit Citation. The Citation is kept in trust with the DFSS. The Citation streamer “FCU Cambodia” is affixed to the head of The Princess Anne Banner. In addition, FCU members and AFP were invited to receive the keys to the City of Sydney on 9/9/1993. About 350 members were on parade. *(Platypus No41 AFP)

== Structure ==
The Royal Australian Signals Corps has a number of regiments and squadrons which support Regular Army, Army Reserve, and Special Operations units and Formations. The Australian Army's two Divisions and each Regular Army Brigade have a Signal Regiment directly supporting their Headquarters, Special Operation Regiments are supported by an Independent Signal Squadron.

In January 2021, the 8th Signal Regiment was established as a National Signal Regiment. Under the new structure, Independent Signal Squadrons within the Army Reserve were amalgamated under the command of the Regimental Headquarters. Whilst the Squadrons are now under the command of 8th Signal Regiment, they are responsible for providing direct support to Reserve Brigades located within their respective states and territories.

On the 09 November 2025, the Chief of Army issued an Order of the Day for the re-raising of the 2nd Signal Regiment. This would include the re-raising of the 110th Signal Squadron to be positioned under the regimental headquarters alongside 145th Signal Squadron. This regiment would continue its support of the 17th Sustainment Brigade and expand to other elements as required.

=== Regular Army ===
- 1st Signal Regiment – 1st Division in Enoggera, Queensland
  - HQ Squadron
  - 100th Logistic Support Squadron
  - 101 Signal Squadron
- 1st Combat Signal Regiment – 1st Brigade in Darwin
  - Operational Support Squadron
  - 104th Signal Squadron
  - 105th Signal Squadron
- 3rd Combat Signal Regiment – 3rd Brigade in Townsville
  - HQ Squadron
  - 102nd Signal Squadron
  - 103rd Signal Squadron
- 7th Combat Signal Regiment – 7th Brigade in Enoggera, Queensland
  - HQ Squadron
  - 139th Signal Squadron
  - 140th Signal Squadron
- 7th Signal Regiment (Electronic Warfare) – 1st Division in Cabarlah
  - 71st Squadron
  - 72nd Squadron
  - 73rd Squadron
  - 138th Signal Squadron
  - Operations Support Squadron
- 2nd Signal Regiment – 17th Sustainment Brigade in Sydney
  - 110th Signal Squadron
  - 145th Signal Squadron
  - Operational Support Troop

=== Army Reserve ===
- 8th Signal Regiment – 2nd Division, Randwick Barracks in Sydney
  - 141st Signal Squadron - Supporting the 11th Brigade at Gallipoli Barracks in Brisbane and Lavarack Barracks in Townsville
  - 142nd Signal Squadron - Supporting the 5th Brigade at Holsworthy Barracks in Liverpool
  - 143rd Signal Squadron - Supporting the 8 OSU and 2nd Division from HMAS Harman in Canberra
  - 144th Signal Squadron - Supporting the 9th Brigade at Keswick Barracks in Adelaide
  - 108th Signal Squadron - Supporting the 4th Brigade at Simpson Barracks in Melbourne and from Derwent Barracks in Hobart
  - 109th Signals Squadron - Supporting the 13th Brigade at Irwin Barracks in Perth
  - Operational Support Squadron - Supporting the 2nd Division at Randwick Barracks in Sydney

=== Special Operations Command ===
- 126th Signal Squadron (2nd Commando Regiment) in Holsworthy, New South Wales
- 152nd Signal Squadron (Special Air Service Regiment) in Perth
- 301st Signal Squadron (1st Commando Regiment) in Randwick, New South Wales

== Colours ==
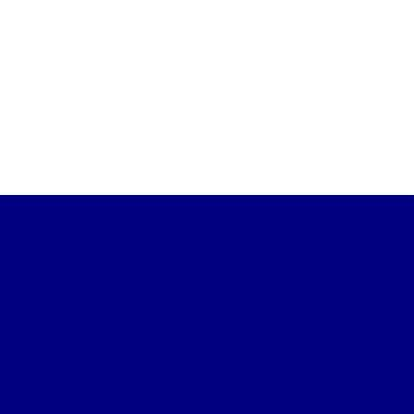
Tactical recognition flash

Domestic colours

The Royal Australian Corps of Signals has two sets of colours, tactical and domestic. The Tactical colours are White on Royal blue. White symbolises the ribbons wound on the Caduceus of the god Hermes and the Blue representing the Royal Colours. The domestic colours, sky blue on dark blue on dark green, represent the three mediums of communication: air, sea, and land.

== Training ==
Soldiers joining the Signals Corps are given training specific to their field at the Defence Force School of Signals after first graduating from recruit training at the Army Recruit Training Centre, Kapooka. The School of Signals is a tri-service educational facility located on Simpson Barracks in Watsonia, Victoria. It is the home of the Signals Corps and the centre for defence training in communications and information systems for the Australian Defence Force. The school was previously located at Balcombe, before moving to Watsonia in the late 1960s. though Balcombe was maintained as a training location for some Signals and Army apprentice courses into the 1980s. The School also has an Electronic Warfare wing, called the Joint Telecommunications School, located on Borneo Barracks in Cabarlah, Queensland.

After successful completion of the 80-day recruit course at Kapooka, all soldiers joining the Signals Corps, regardless of specialisation, first complete an eight-day Common Corps course which provides basic Royal Australian Corps of Signals skills in radio, line laying and computing and is a prerequisite for all Australian Regular Army RA Sigs trade courses. The course (and most subsequent training) is held at Defence Force School of Signals, Simpson Barracks, Macleod, Victoria. On successful completion of the Common Corps course, students will be placed in a holding platoon while they wait for their trade course to start. During this time students may be placed on other courses, such as driver training.

Specialist Roles:

- Battlespace Communications Specialist: Battlespace Communications Specialist (renamed from Communication Systems Operator in 2020) conduct initial training that is a 21-week course in which trainees are instructed in the operation and maintenance of military High Frequency (HF) and Very High Frequency (VHF) radios, satellite communications (SATCOM), frequency hopping and cryptographic equipment all whilst working in small teams called Detachments. Battlespace Communication Specialists are also trained to deploy computer networks as a part of radio networks and to operate computer-based communications applications. This training is conducted in a range of simulated environments based upon dismounted, vehicle and Command Post operations.
- Telecommunications Technician: Telecommunications Technician training is a 72-week course that incorporates all aspects of the telecommunications communications equipment used in RA Sigs Units. Subjects include telecommunications cabling, satellite theory and equipment stations, circuit switch networks, docking, telephone systems and local and wide-area computer networks.
- Electronic Warfare Operator: The Electronic Warfare Operator course is delivered in two parts due to the security clearance requirements. It trains ARA trainees in Electronic Warfare and Signal Intelligence fundamentals, including basic language skills and typing.
  - Part One is of 22 weeks duration and is delivered at the Australian Defence Force School of Languages, RAAF Williams, Laverton, Victoria.
  - Part Two is of 36 weeks duration and is delivered at Defence Force School of Signals, Electronic Warfare Wing, Borneo Barracks, Cabarlah, Queensland.

To commence Part Two training, trainees must have a Top Secret Positive Vetted (TSPV) clearance, which depending on the individual and on personal history can take from 6 to 12 months to acquire. Both the ADF School of Languages and the Defence Force School of Signals (DFSS) are tri-service training facilities and also train Navy and Air Force personnel.

- Information Systems Technician: Training incorporates a wide variety of Information Technology (IT) subjects including fundamentals of computing, diagnosing hardware and software problems, network operating systems, installation of applications and peripheral devices, operating a help desk, data communications and operation of a Deployable Local Area Network (DLAN).
- Cyber Analyst: Operate on the new frontier of combat, using state-of-the-art technology to defend our systems and platforms against malicious cyber activity.

== Equipment ==
Flag of the RASigs

Project Parakeet is the Army's mobile Battlefield Telecommunications Network (BTN) which was introduced into service in the mid-1990s through Project JP65. At the time of its introduction, Project Parakeet was considered to be a highly advanced military communications system. It included secure voice and data trunking services.

In 2002, the Defence Force commenced the multi-phase Project JP2072 Battlespace Communications System, including combat net radio and trunk communications replacement.

Phase 2A of Project JP 2072 is replacing the ageing fleet of Wagtail (VHF), Raven (VHF/HF) and Pintail (V/UHF) hand-held / man portable tactical radios and the AN/PSC-5 / 5D SATCOM.

The Army is introducing new Harris tactical radios:-

- AN/PRC-152 handheld (V/UHF) Software Defined Radio (SDR)
- AN/PRC-150 manpack (HF) SDR
- AN/PRC-117F manpack wideband Satellite Communications (SATCOM)
- AN/PRC-117G manpack multiband SATCOM

In September 2015, Boeing was awarded Phase 2B to replace Parakeet known as Project Currawong by 2020 using digital wideband voice, data and video services over wireless and wired infrastructure.

== Order of precedence ==
Preceded by Royal Australian Engineers	Australian Army Order of Precedence	Succeeded by Royal Australian Infantry Corps
