= Macleod Estate =

Residential estate in Macleod, Melbourne

Coordinates: 37°43′38″S 145°03′54″E

Macleod Estate, often referred-to as Victoria Cross Estate or VC Estate, is a residential housing estate with an area of approximately 35 hectares located in the Melbourne suburb of Macleod in Victoria, Australia. It is bounded by the Hurstbridge railway line to the east, Dunvegan Estate to the north, Waiora Road to the west and the suburb of Rosanna to the south.

== History ==
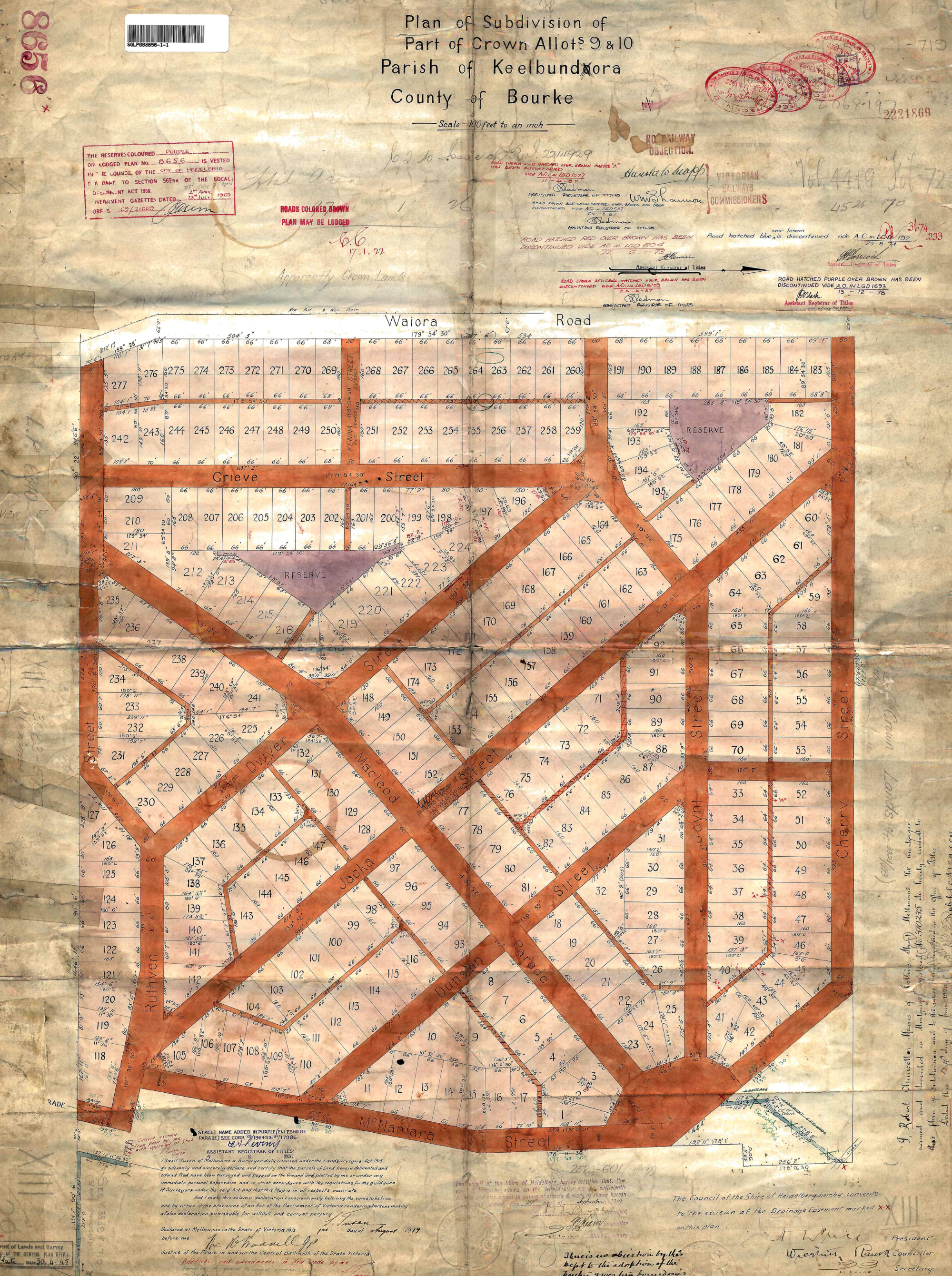
The original 1919 survey by Saxil Tuxen for the Macleod Estate in Macleod, Victoria, Australia.

The Macleod Estate traces its origins to the colonial land sales in the Colony of Victoria, when Crown Portions 9 and 10 in the Parish of Keelbundoora, County of Burke (covering modern-day Macleod and Bundoora) were sold to Neil McLean on 5 February 1840 for £816. After purchase, Neil McLean named both properties ‘Strathallan’. McLean's brother, Malcolm, took over the land in 1842, but then returned to Scotland with his wife and children in the late 1850s, leaving an agent in control. Much of the flatter land was cleared of vegetation for farming aside from some of the large river red gums (Eucalyptus camaldulensis). The agent leased portions of the land to several tenant farmers for grazing, dairying, and other activities.

Charles Henry James MLC purchased the Strathallan estate from the McLean family in December 1888 for £234,000 but his purchase was subject to protracted legal battles and disputes that continued until 1891, by which time Mr. James was bankrupt. Ownership of a large portion of the property (covering all of Crown Portion 9 and a little of Crown Portion 10) then transferred to the Commercial Bank of Australia in 1902.

The Commercial Bank of Australia subdivided the land into three portions. On 18 December 1908, the bank sold the northernmost and central sections to Edith Jessie Macleod. The southern portion of the bank's holding was sold to Michael Le Grand in 1911.

Le Grand died on 12 July 1914 and bequeathed his estate to his wife Annie Le Grand. She obtained title in 1916. She sold a portion of land adjacent to the Hurstbridge Railway line to the Victorian Railway Commissioners in 1916 (to enable the establishment of railway sidings in Macleod) and another portion to the Crown in 1918 to enable the establishment of the Mont Park branch line.

In 1919, Le Grand sold her remaining interests in the land. The area was subsequently prepared for subdivision into the Macleod Estate. The surveyor was Saxil Tuxen, who designed a scheme with several internal reserves and had all of the streets named after Victoria Cross recipients (which is why it has come to be known colloquially as the Victoria Cross Estate).

== Land Sales ==
Current property boundaries and features in the Macleod Estate.

Lots in the Macleod Estate were first advertised for sale in 1919. Most of the development in the estate occurred after the 1940s.

== Other Features ==
The Macleod Estate contains several community assets, current and former, including:

- The western entrance to the Macleod station.
- John McRobbie Reserve
- VC Estate Reserve
- Macleod Scout Hall

Lots in Macnamara Street, between Jacka and Dunstan Streets were subdivided into shop sites in the 1950s, although this wasn't part of the original estate plan. These once included a petrol station/garage, post office and milk bar.

In 2014, the City of Banyule upgraded street signage and installed information panels in the Macleod Estate to highlight the history of the soldiers after whom the streets are named.
