= Yallambie =

- Suburb
- Interactive map of Yallambie
- Coordinates: 37.726°S 145.104°E
- Country: Australia
- State: Victoria
- City: Melbourne
- LGA: City of Banyule
- Location: 19 km (12 mi) from Melbourne

Government
  - State electorate: Ivanhoe
  - Federal division: Jagajaga

Area
  - Total: 3.1 km^{2} (1.2 sq mi)

Population
  - Total: 4,161 (2021 census)
  - Density: 1,342/km^{2} (3,480/sq mi)
- Postcode: 3085
Suburbs around Yallambie
Watsonia	Greensborough	Montmorency
Macleod	Yallambie	Lower Plenty
Rosanna	Viewbank	Lower Plenty

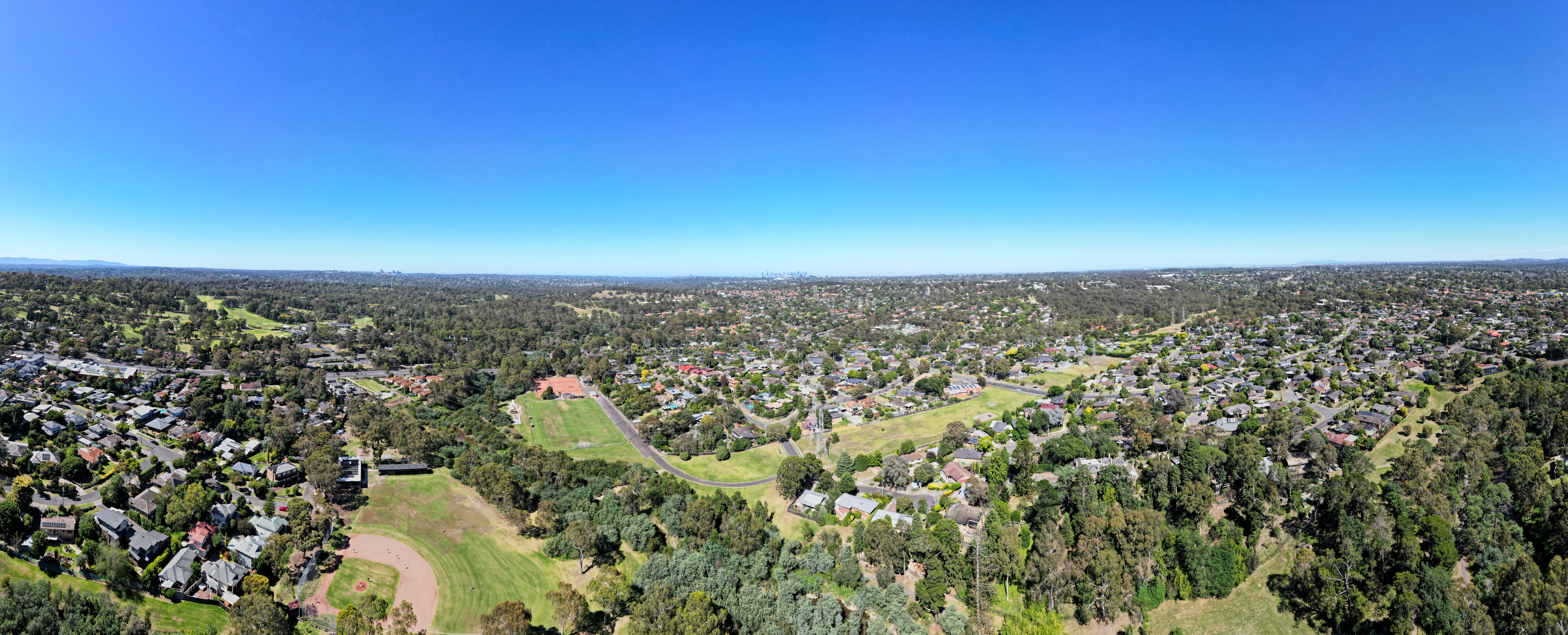
Yallambie aerial panorama facing the Melbourne skyline. February 2024.

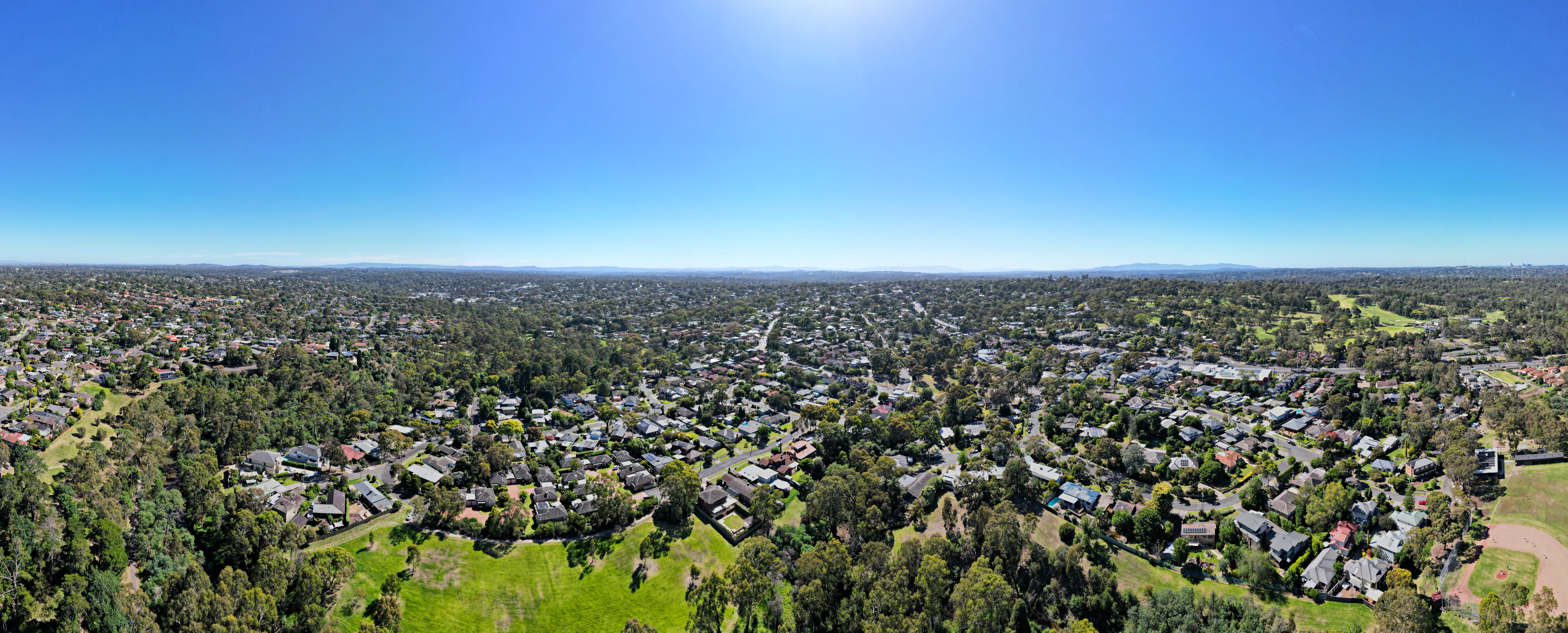
Yallambie aerial panorama facing the Melbourne skyline. February 2024.

Yallambie (/jəˈlæmbi/ yə-LAM-bee) is a suburb of Melbourne, Victoria, Australia, 15 kilometres north-east from Melbourne's Central Business District, located within the City of Banyule local government area. Yallambie recorded a population of 4,161 at the 2021 census.

Yallambie is a residential suburb stretched between Greensborough Road to the west and the Plenty River on its east. Its southern border is Lower Plenty Road and Yallambie Road in the north. It shares the same postcode as neighbouring Macleod.

== History ==
=== 20th century ===
The predominant feature in Yallambie is the Simpson Army Barracks. Originally known as the Watsonia Military Camp, it was set up during the Second World War. Yallambie is also home to the Air Force Cadets and the Defence Force School of Signals.

Yallambie's residential population almost doubled when a large parcel of reserved land behind the barracks was converted to residential use following rationalisation of military facilities during the late 1980s. This parcel of land is now known as the Streeton Views Estate.

Yallambie has never had a post office of that name, however the Simpson Barracks Post Office opened on 31 March 1987, replacing the Macleod office open since 1923, and was closed in 1996. A Watsonia Military office was open from 1942 until 1946 and a Watsonia Camp office was open from 1948 until 1952.

=== 21st century ===
During the early 2000s, the 'Cascades' estate was developed adjacent to grassed areas along the water feature.

== Geography ==
=== Landmarks ===
Yallambie is home to the Federal Government agency Australian Radiation Protection and Nuclear Safety Agency (ARPANSA).

== Education ==
Yallambie is home to Streeton Primary School, which is a combination of 2 previous schools called Watsonia South Primary School & Yallambie Primary School which is located on the old Yallambie Primary School site. Streeton is named after well known artist Arthur Streeton. Yallambie's main pre-school facility is Yallambie Park Pre-School, which is located on the same road as Streeton Primary School.

The public library service is provided by Yarra Plenty Regional Library. The nearest library is at Watsonia or Rosanna.

== Sports ==
Banyule City SC is a soccer club located at Yallambie Park and the senior team currently compete in the FFV State League Division 1.

== See also ==
- City of Heidelberg – Yallambie was previously within this former local government area.
- Electoral district of Ivanhoe
