= Greensborough College =

Location
- Watsonia, Victoria; Australia
- Coordinates: 37°42′33″S 145°5′26″E

Information
- Type: Co-educational state school
- Principal: Pauline Barker
- Years offered: 7–12
- Enrolment: 450
- Campus: Greensborough, Victoria
- Colour(s): Blue, grey & yellow
- Slogan: Strive For Excellence
- Newspaper: Greensborough Focus (fortnightly newsletter)
- Yearbook: The Retrospective
- Website: http://www.greensc.vic.edu.au/

Greensborough College is a school in the Greensborough and Watsonia district in the suburbs of Melbourne, Australia.

Greensborough College currently caters for approximately 450 students and is a co-educational government secondary school. Students range from Year 7 to Year 12. As of 2020 the college accepts enrolments from across Melbourne, including but not limited to: Greensborough, Watsonia, Montmorency, St Helena, Mill Park, South Morang and Doreen.

== History and information ==
Greensborough College occupies the site formerly known as the Watsonia Technical School. The nearby Watsonia High School and the Watsonia Technical School were merged to form Greensborough Secondary College for the beginning of the 1990 school year, with the high school campus serving as a senior school for years 11 and 12, and the larger technical school used as a junior campus. It was renamed Greensborough College when the former high school campus was closed in 1992. It is currently a co-educational school.

== Curriculum ==
Greensborough College offers its Year 10, 11 and 12 students a choice between the Victorian Certificate of Education (VCE) and Victorian Certificate of Applied Learning (VCAL).

Year 7, 8 and 9 students follow the Victorian Curriculum as set by the Victorian Curriculum and Assessment Authority. Students complete core subjects of English, Mathematics, Science, Physical Education, Humanities, Pastoral Care (CONNECT), Health and are introduced to subjects in Music, STEM, Drama, Studio Arts, Media, Visual Communication and Design, Italian, Automotive, Woodwork and Food Technology.

== Campus ==
As at December 2020, Greensborough College is undertaking Stage 2 of upgrades and modernisation via the Victorian School Building Authority. In the 2019-20 Victorian State Budget, the school received $994,700. In 2020, the school received $8.95 million.

As part of the North East Link Project, the Victorian School Building Authority and Banyule City Council are currently upgrading Sporting Facilities at Greensborough College. This includes a new multi-use sports pavilion, Australian Rules/Cricket Oval, soccer pitch, running track, electronic scoreboards and light towers. This project is scheduled for completion in June 2021.

== Notable alumni ==
Gabby Newton (Graduated 2019)

Matthew Temple (Graduated 2017)
