= Watsonia, Victoria =

Watsonia
- Suburb
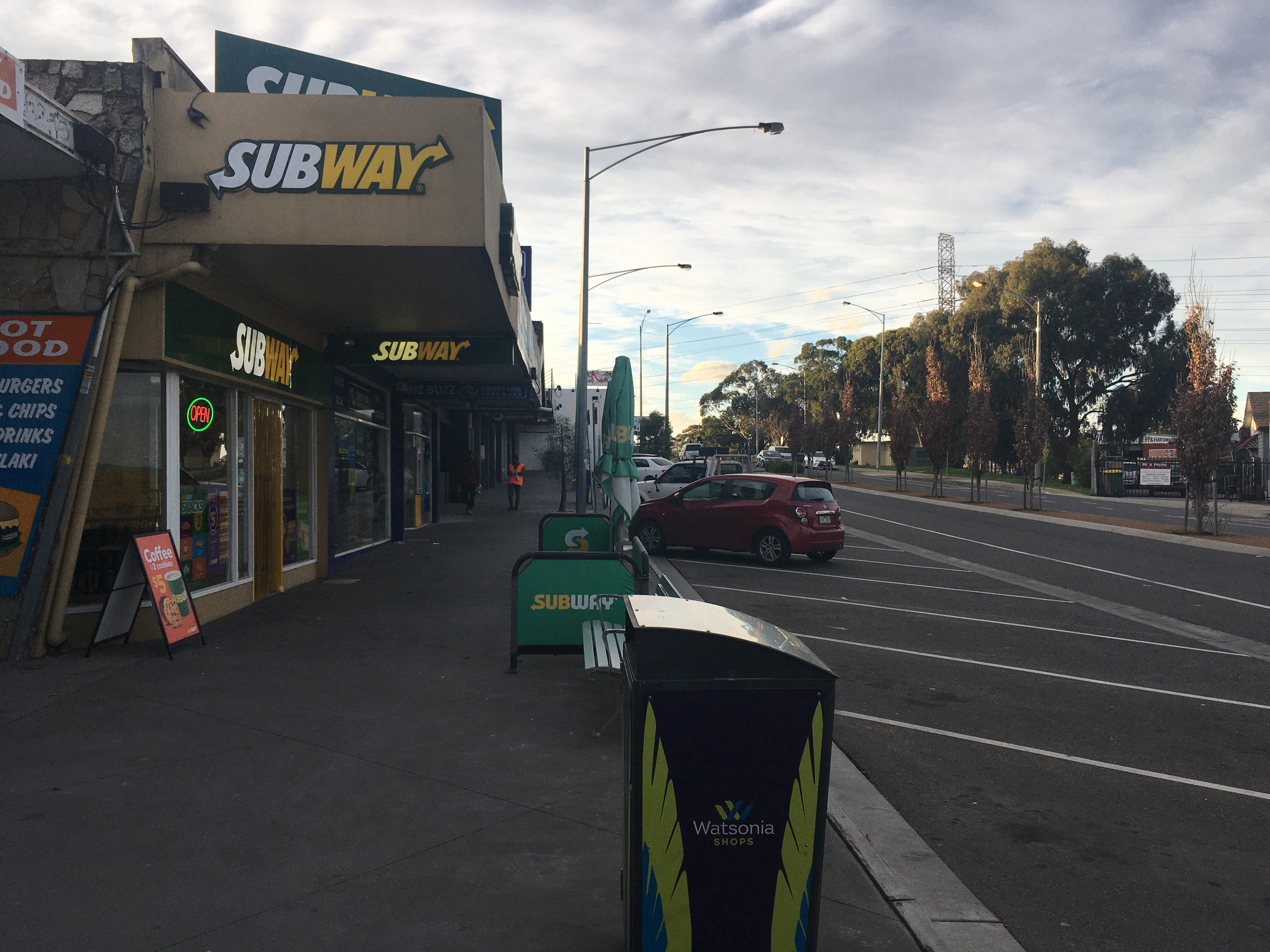
- Shops on Watsonia Road, Watsonia

- Interactive map of Watsonia
- Coordinates: 37.708°S 145.083°E
- Country: Australia
- State: Victoria
- City: Melbourne
- LGA: City of Banyule
- Location: 16 km (9.9 mi) from Melbourne
- Established: 1924

Government
  - State electorates: Bundoora; Ivanhoe
  - Federal division: Jagajaga

Area
  - Total: 2.4 km^{2} (0.93 sq mi)

Population
  - Total: 5,352 (2021 census)
  - Density: 2,230/km^{2} (5,780/sq mi)
- Postcode: 3087
Suburbs around Watsonia
Bundoora	Watsonia North	Greensborough
	Watsonia	Greensborough
Macleod	Yallambie	Yallambie

Watsonia is a suburb of Melbourne, Victoria, Australia, 16 km north-east of Melbourne's Central Business District, located within the City of Banyule local government area. Watsonia recorded a population of 5,352 at the 2021 census.

== History ==
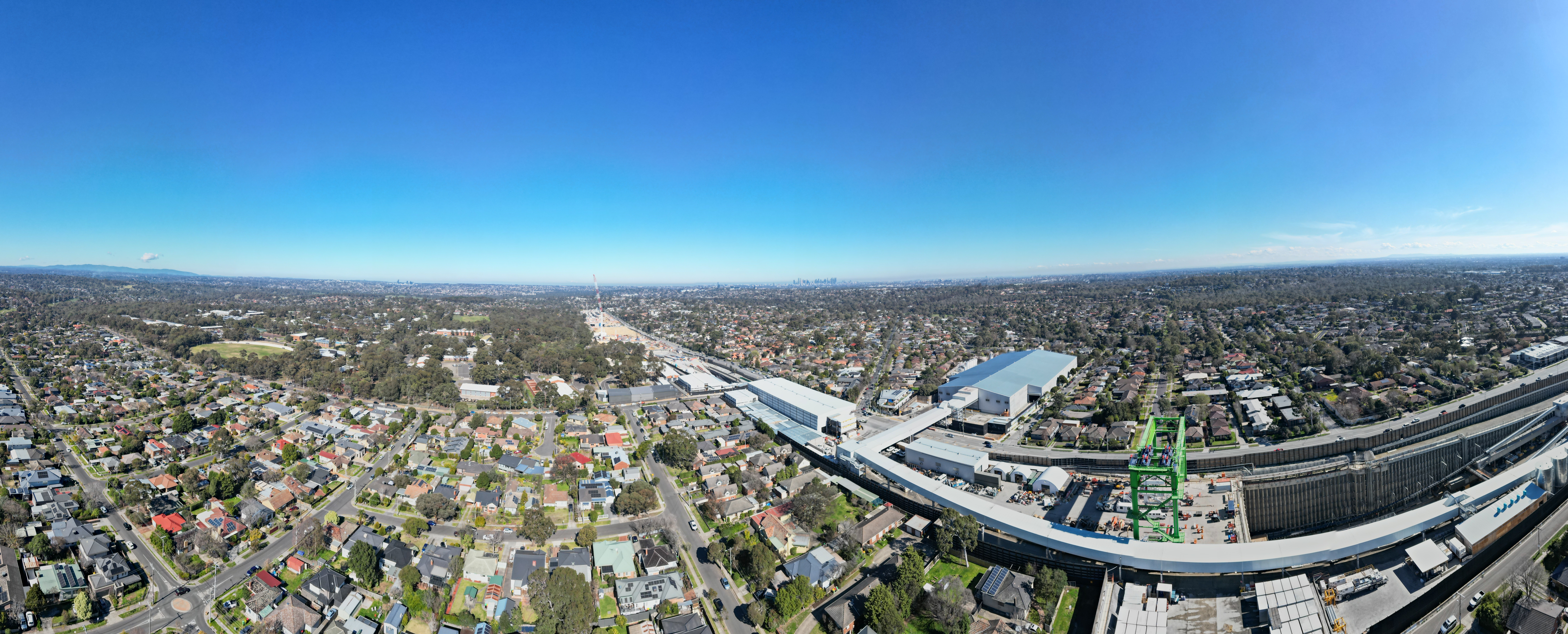
Watsonia facing the Melbourne skyline, with the Northeast Link Big Build

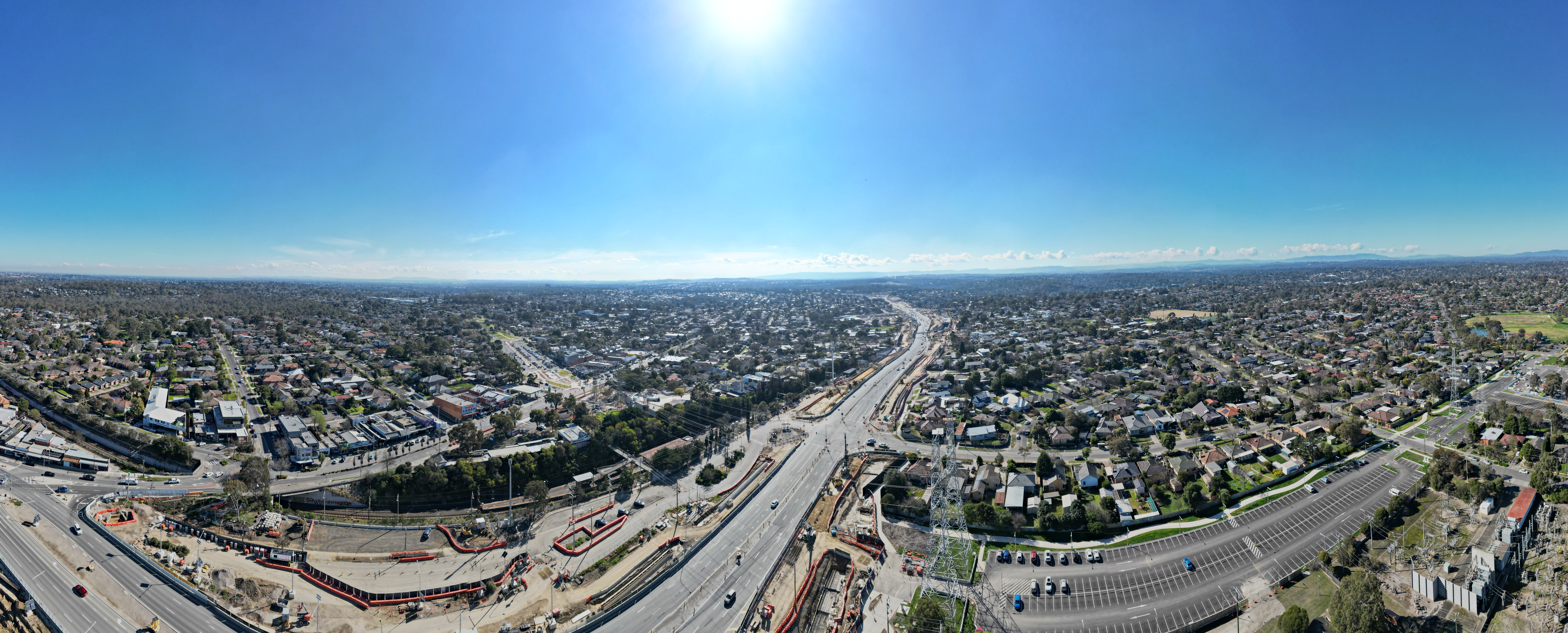
Watsonia facing north, with the Northeast Link Big Build in 2025

Watsonia originally belonged to the Wurundjeri people. It is named after early property developer and landowner Frank Watson.

Watsonia was surveyed by Robert Hoddle in 1838 as part of the parish of Keelbundora, for subdivisional sale as farms. Until the 1870s, much of Watsonia remained part of the vast property holdings of John Brown. The Grace Park area was purchased in 1877 by Frederick Augustus Nell, and then by Frank Watson in the early twentieth century. Watson subdivided the property for housing in 1924. The area remained primarily rural until the 1940s, when property prices became affordable.

Watson and other local landowners paid for the establishment of a railway station in order to attract property buyers. Subdivision commenced with the sale of 44 allotments from the Grace Park Estate, next to the new railway station, in June 1924. Watsonia railway station was named after Mr. F. Watson and was opened on Monday 23 June 1924, between the existing Macleod and Greensborough Stations. It was initially intended to be called Collins. Watsonia Post Office opened around 1934.

In 1931, 40 acres of land at Watsonia was purchased to build a novitiate for the Jesuit Order of the Roman Catholic Church. November 1932, a foundation stone was laid for the construction of a Jesuit seminary. The studies and retreat house was opened in 1934. In 1974, the Watsonia Institure of social welfare opened on the site. Months later plans to use the site as a periodic detention centre were rejected by the local community. In 1979, the land was donated to the Catholic Archdiocese of Melbourne by the Society of Jesus (Jesuits) for the purpose of building a Catholic secondary school. Loyola College was established in 1980 and is set on 27 acres. It is a member of the Ignatian Network, a group of Jesuit and non-Jesuit schools worldwide. In 1973 Concord School opened in Grimshaw Street, a specialist school.

Watsonia Station is in Zone 2 on the Hurstbridge railway line and is currently served by Metro Trains Melbourne. The North East Link Project will impact Watsonia, with a tunnel being constructed from Watsonia to Bulleen. There will also be a new tree-lined Greensborough Road boulevard from Watsonia to Rosanna.

Loyola College Alumni Association organise an annual classic car show.

== Demographics ==
According to the 2011 Census, 78.0% of Watsonia residents were born in Australia. The most common countries of birth other than Australia are England 2.3%, China (excluding SARs and Taiwan) 2.0%, India 1.3%, Italy 1.0% and Sri Lanka 0.8%.

== Landmarks ==
The Simpson Army Barracks, Yallambie was originally known as the Watsonia Military Camp during World War II. This complex was built on the property formerly owned by Ainslie Meares. In 1951, surrounding land was purchased for the extension of the barracks.

Local schools include Watsonia Primary School, Greensborough College and Loyola College.

Watsonia Library is a bright, modern, well-equipped community library located in Watsonia's shopping precinct with ample parking and adjacent to the Watsonia train station. It is a branch of Yarra Plenty Regional Library

== Sport ==
Watsonia Football Club, an Australian Rules football team, competes in the Northern Football League.

== Popular culture ==
The early 2000s punk indie band Klinger has a song called Watsonia.

LGBT romance film Of An Age is set in Watsonia.

== See also ==
- Shire of Diamond Valley – Watsonia was previously within this former local government area.
