= Parakeet (communication system) =

Australian army service

Parakeet is an Australian Army mobile battlefield communication system, developed by AWA Defence Industries. Parakeet utilises a satellite radio system, which supports remotely deployed units, allowing communication for land forces.

== Development ==
It was first introduced into service in the mid-1990s through project JP65. Parakeet was considered (at the time) advanced military communications. This included secure voice and data trunking services.

Project JP2072 was raised in 2017, to upgrade its sub-systems. As described in the project summary, Parakeet was developed as a Battlespace Communications System Land (BCS-L), aiming to replace older, less effective Battlefield Telecommunications Network (BTN). It was operated by Royal Australian Corps of Signals (RASIGS) personnel.
