= Simpson Barracks =

Coordinates: 37°43′23″S 145°05′35″E

Simpson Barracks is an Australian Army facility in the suburb of Yallambie in Melbourne, Victoria, Australia. It is named after Major General Colin Hall Simpson, Signals Officer-in-Charge of Allied Land Forces during the Second World War.

Simpson Barracks is home to the DFSS (Defence Force School of Signals), Financial Services Unit, Defence Force School of Music, and the headquarters of 4th Brigade. It also has depots for 4th/19th Prince of Wales's Light Horse Regiment and 108th Signals Squadron. It also is the main workshop for 105 Field Workshop (RAEME). It also houses the Victorian Headquarters for the Australian Army Cadets, 402 Squadron, Australian Air Force Cadets and 39 Army Cadet Unit Watsonia.

Simpson Barracks was constructed out of red brick which was the style in the mid-1930s and during the Second World War, red brick was discarded in favour of timber buildings clad with corrugated galvanised iron or asbestos sheet.

The Simpson Barracks Post Office opened on 31 March 1987 replacing the Macleod office open since 1923, and was closed in 1996. A Watsonia Military Post Office was open from 1942 until 1946 and a Watsonia Camp office was open from 1948 until 1952.

Simpson Barracks also has its own chapel, where over 250 weddings have been celebrated since it opened in 1971. It was modelled on the chapel in Nui Dat in South Vietnam. The Simpson Barracks Chapel has seating capacity for 80 people, and has a regular Eucharist/Mass. Baptisms and funerals are also held there.

The Royal Australian Army Corps of Signals Museum and Royal Australian Army Pay Corps Museum are located at Simpson Barracks.
