= Macleod College =

- Melbourne, Victoria; Australia

Information
- Type: Co-educational public government school
- Motto: Hold Fast and Murus Aheneus Esto, meaning "Be thou a wall of brass".
- Principal: Mario Panaccio
- Colours: Red, green, yellow and white
- Website: http://www.macleod.vic.edu.au/

Macleod College is a co-educational, Prep to Year Twelve school located on the corner of May and Carwarp Streets, Macleod, Melbourne, Australia. Information on the Primary can be found at macleodcollegeprimary.edublogs.org. The College grew out of the merger of Macleod High School and Macleod Primary School in 2000. It has two sister schools, the Geschwister Scholl Gymnasium (GSG) in Düsseldorf, Germany, and the Hauibei Experimental School in the Anhui province in China and has an international student program.

Macleod College is next to the Macleod railway station and Macleod kindergarten. It shares facilities with the adjacent Banyule NETS stadium.

In 2010 Macleod College obtained funds through the National School Pride Program to renovate its Year Seven area to an open-plan design and the Primary Schools for the 21st Century program to build a new wing for Grade 3-6 students.

== Student computers ==
In 2012 Macleod College started its 1:1 ICT Program. Every student from Year 7 to 12 has the option to purchase an iPad or computer. Suggestions are given, though other options can be taken. Students who cannot afford a computer can request a computer from the school, and it may be supplied. The school also has a large library that is full of desktop computers.

== Macleod College Music Academy ==
Macleod College has a strong history of music education. It was established as one of four Victorian specialist music schools in the 1970s and continues to maintain high standards of music performance. One in five students at Macleod College are currently involved in the music performance program.

== VET hairdressing ==
Macleod College has a dedicated hairdressing training salon to deliver the VET hairdressing course. Eleven schools in the Northern Metropolitan zone send students to Macleod College to do the course.

== Student destinations ==
The Department of Education's On Track data shows that 90.7% of Macleod College students that completed Year 12 in 2013 and applied for university or TAFE/VET places received an offer; 74.1% were offered a university place and 16.7% were offered a TAFE/VET course place.
