= Macleod, Victoria =

Macleod
- Suburb
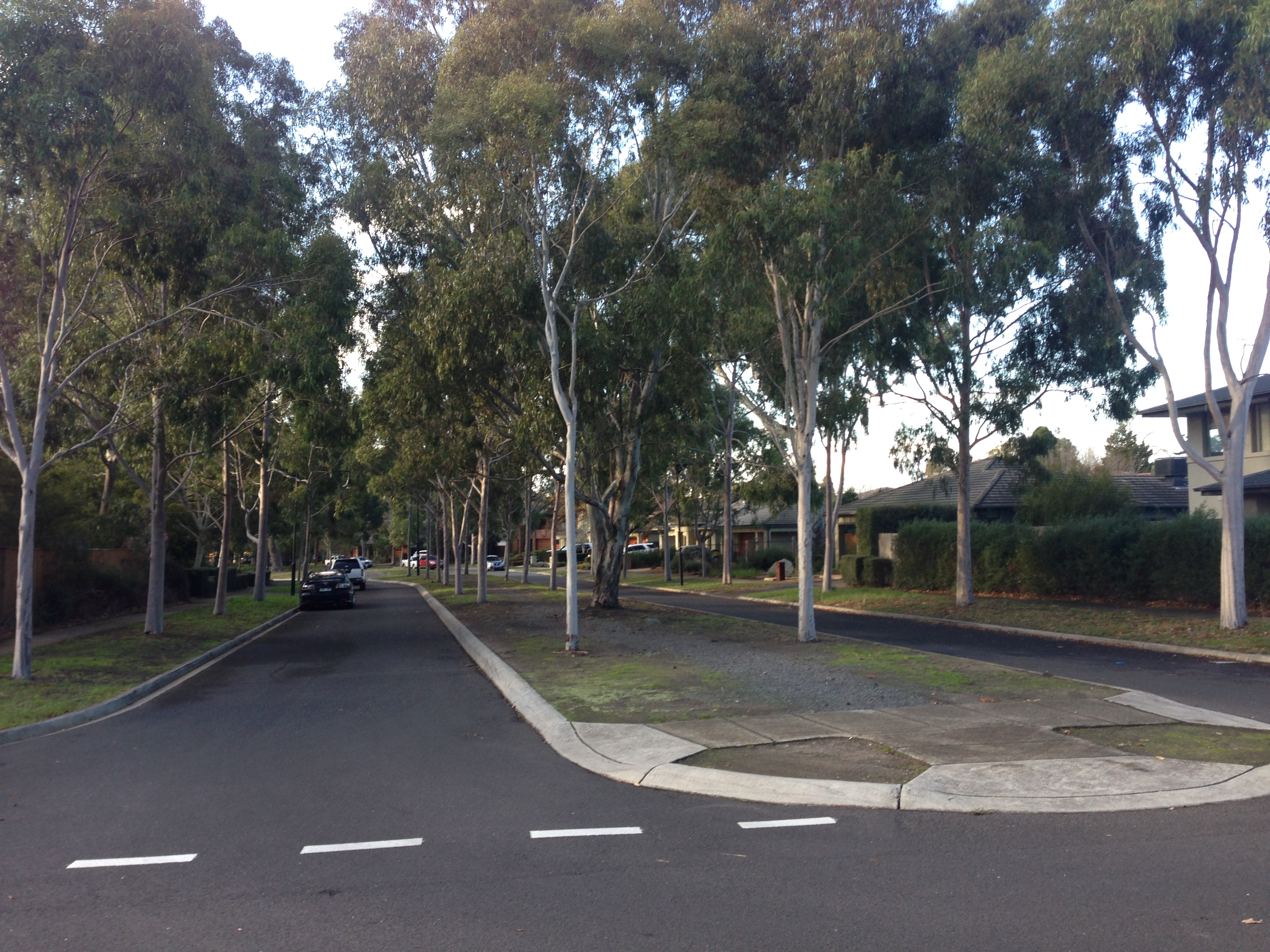
- Springthorpe Estate, Macleod

- Interactive map of Macleod
- Coordinates: 37.714°S 145.066°E
- Country: Australia
- State: Victoria
- City: Melbourne
- LGAs: City of Darebin; City of Banyule
- Location: 14 km (8.7 mi) NE of Melbourne

Government
  - State electorates: Ivanhoe; Bundoora
  - Federal divisions: Cooper; Jagajaga

Area
  - Total: 2.7 km^{2} (1.0 sq mi)

Population
  - Total: 9,892 (2021 census)
  - Density: 3,660/km^{2} (9,490/sq mi)
- Postcode: 3085
Suburbs around Macleod
Bundoora	Bundoora; Watsonia	Watsonia
Bundoora	Macleod	Yallambie
Heidelberg Heights; Heidelberg West	Rosanna	Yallambie

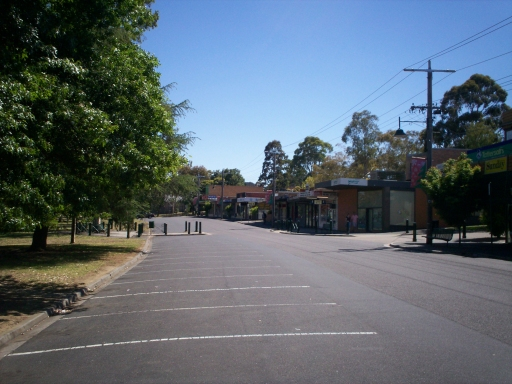
Macleod Shops

Macleod is a suburb in Melbourne, Victoria, Australia, 14 km (8.7 mi) north-east of Melbourne's Central Business District, located within the Cities of Banyule and Darebin local government areas. Macleod recorded a population of 9,892 at the 2021 census.

Macleod West refers to the predominantly residential locality to the west of the railway line and station.

== History ==
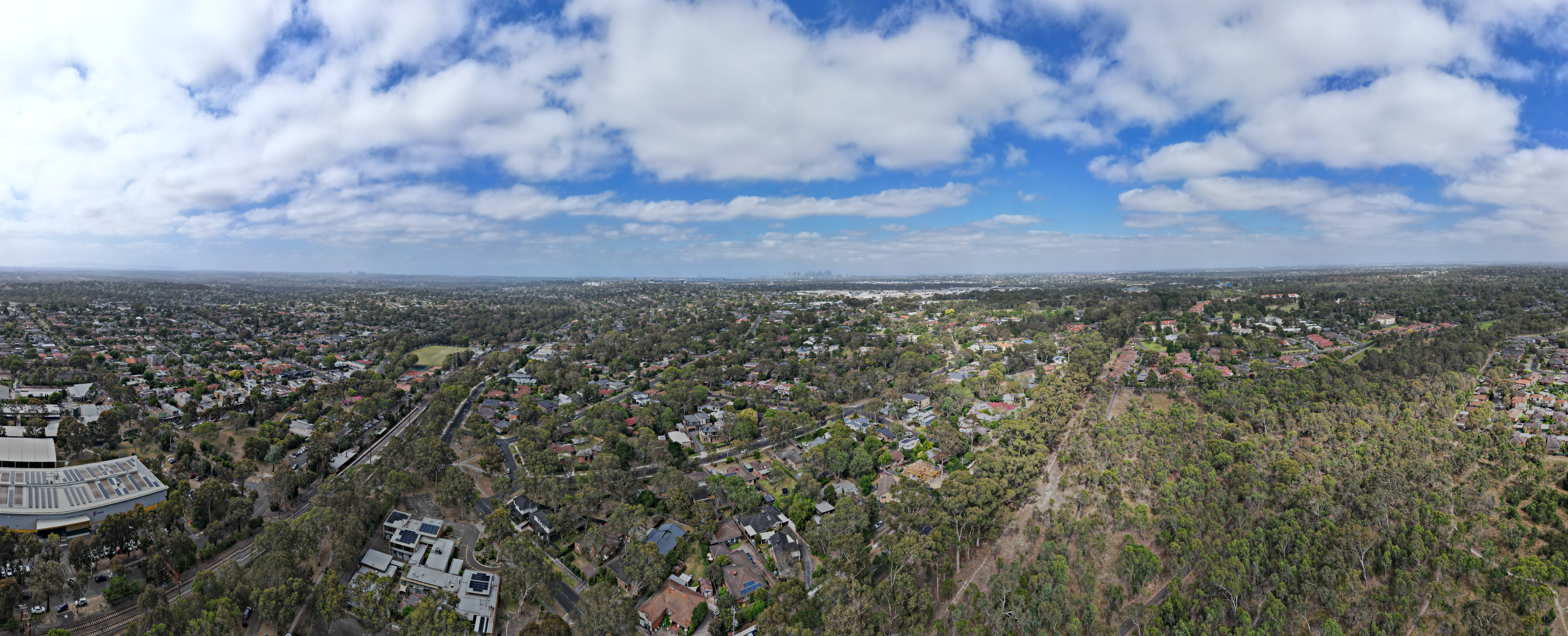
Aerial panorama of Macleod facing west towards the Melbourne skyline. February 2024.

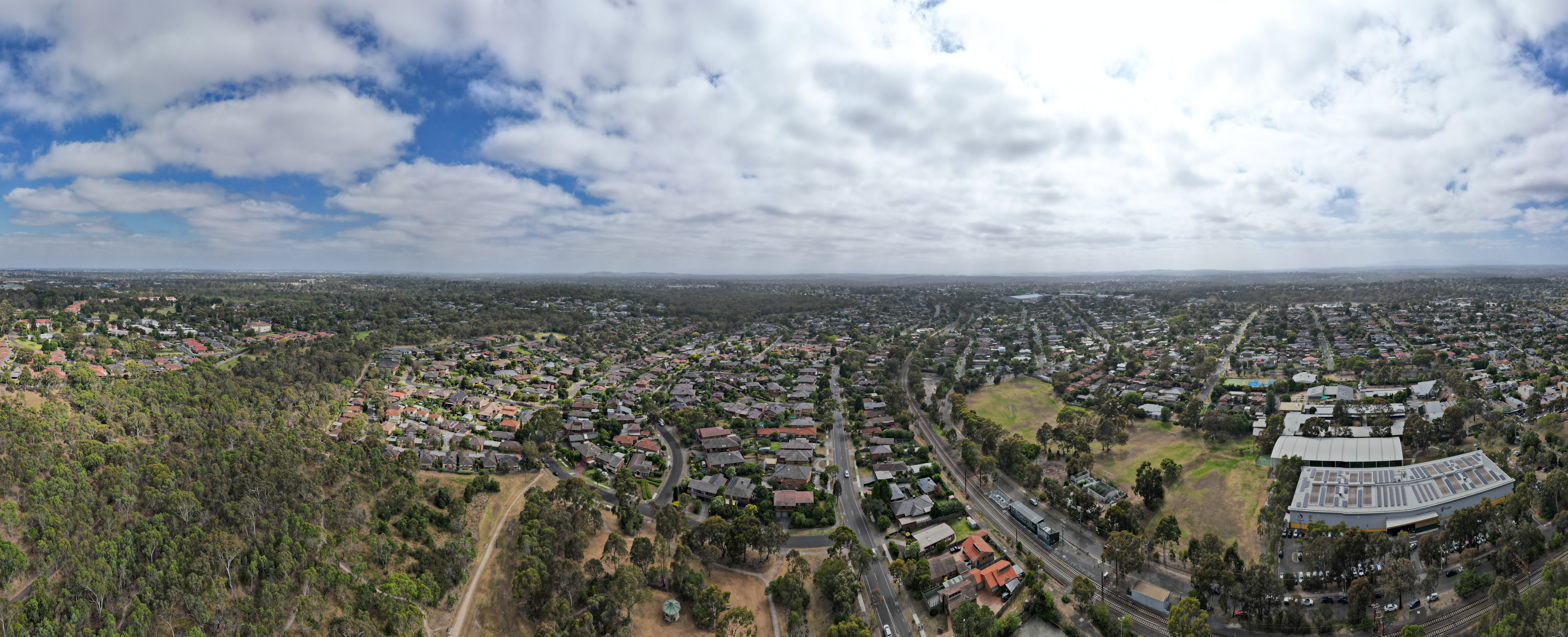
Aerial panorama of Macleod facing east towards the Dandenong Ranges. February 2024.

Modern-day Macleod traces its origins to the colonial land sales in the Colony of Victoria. Crown Portions 9 and 10 in the Parish of Keelbundoora, County of Burke were sold to Neil McLean on 5 February 1840 for £816. After purchase, Neil McLean named his property "Strathallan". McLean’s brother, Malcolm, took over the land in 1842, but then returned to Scotland with his wife and children in the late 1850’s, leaving an agent in control. Much of the flatter land was cleared of vegetation for farming aside from some of the large river red gums (Eucalyptus camaldulensis). The agent leased portions of the land to several tenant farmers for grazing, dairying, and other activities.

Charles Henry James MLC purchased the Strathallan estate from the McLean family in December 1888 for £234,000 but his purchase was subject to protracted legal battles and disputes that continued until 1891, by which time Mr. James was bankrupt. Ownership of a large portion of the property (covering all of Crown Portion 9 and a little of Crown Portion 10) then transferred to the Commercial Bank of Australia in 1902.

On 18 December 1908, Edith Jessie Macleod paid £6000 for 400 acres from the Commercial Bank, or approximately £15 per acre. The press of the time credited Edith Macleod's husband, Malcolm Anderson Macleod, with owning the land but this was not the case. On 19 December 1908, a portion of this land measuring 31.51 hectares was sold to the State Government of Victoria for £2375, or £30 per acre to enable the construction of a branch railway line from the Hurstrbridge railway to the neighbouring Mont Park asylum. The timing and methods by which the strip of land was acquired for the railway line was likely corrupt. The land transfer was examined as part of the 1909 Royal Commission on the Acquisition of Certain Estates by Sir Thomas Bent. The enquiry found that the purchase price was excessive.

One of the first residential subdivisions in Macleod occurred on 12 November 1910 when Edith Macleod auctioned 133 allotments from an area marketed as the Strathallan Estate, fronting Greensborough Road, Strathallan Road, Edward Street and Railway Place (Somers Avenue). At the time the area comprising Macleod and Rosanna was called North Heidelberg. The suburb of Macleod was later named after Malcolm Anderson Macleod, who was a prominent local resident.

Macleod railway station opened in 1911, 9 years after the railway line passed through.

Macleod Post Office opened on 11 December 1923, located in the general store on the south-west corner of Greensborough and Strathallan Roads. It was replaced by the Simpson Barracks office in 1987. Macleod West Post Office opened in 1954 on McNamara Street, between Dunstan and Ruthven Streets.

The first Aberdeen Road shops were built in the early to mid-1950s, between Erskine Road and Leith Road.

Macleod Primary School was built in 1926 on 4.5 acres of land on Greensborough Road, between Coolie Avenue and Fairlie Avenue.

Macleod High School opened on 31 May 1954 after a one-week delay caused by the condition of unmade roads, which prevented furniture deliveries. The headmaster was Mr. F. J. Meyer. The initial enrolment consisted of 70 boys and 160 girls.

Multiple subsequent housing estates were established in the twentieth century, including the Macleod (Victoria Cross) Estate, Golf Links Estate and the Dunvegan Estate. The Springthorpe Estate was built in the 2000s when the Mont Park Hospital was closed.

== Demographics ==
In Macleod, 68.5% of people were born in Australia. Excluding Australia, the most common countries of birth were China (excludes SARs and Taiwan) 3.4%, England 2.8%, India 1.8%, Italy 1.6%, and Malaysia 1.1%. 71.4% of people only spoke English at home. Other languages spoken at home included, Mandarin 3.9%, Italian 2.9%, Cantonese 1.3%, Greek 1.2% and Macedonian 1.2%.

== Education ==
Macleod has three high Schools, Macleod College, Charles La Trobe College, and Ivanhoe Grammar (University Campus).

== Facilities ==
Public library services are provided by Yarra Plenty Regional Library. The nearest library is Watsonia Library.

== Sport ==
Macleod's local Australian rules football team is the Macleod Kangaroos, who play in Division 1 of the Northern Football League (NFL), and are based at De Winton Park in Rosanna. They are affiliated with the Macleod Junior Football Club (known as the Eagles), who play in the Yarra Junior Football League (YJFL). The junior football club is based at Macleod Park.

Macleod's cricket team is the Macleod Eagles. They play in the Diamond Valley Cricket Association (DVCA) and are based at Macleod Park, known as "The Nest".

The Banyule & Districts Netball Association, located in Somers Avenue, is an affiliated member of Netball Victoria. They run NetSetGo, junior and senior netball competitions. They have a four court indoor stadium and two additional outdoor courts (if required).

There is also a local basketball team called the Banyule Hawks, whose home ground is the Macleod Recreation Centre.

== Transport ==
=== Bus ===
Three bus routes service Macleod:

- 514 : Eltham station – Glenroy station via Greensborough. Operated by Dysons.
- 548 : Kew (Cotham Road) – La Trobe University. Operated by Ventura Bus Lines.
- 561 : Macleod – Pascoe Vale station via La Trobe University. Operated by Dysons.

=== Train ===
Macleod is served by one railway station: Macleod, located on the Hurstbridge line.

== See also ==
- City of Heidelberg – Parts of Macleod were previously within this former local government area.
- Shire of Diamond Valley – Parts of Macleod were previously within this former local government area.
