= Mont Park railway line =

Railway line in Australia

Mont Park

Overview
- Status: Dismantled
- Connecting lines: Hurstbridge line
- Stations: 1

Service
- Type: Melbourne suburban service
- Services: Freight only

History
- Opened: August 28th 1911
- Closed: June 30th 1964

Technical
- Number of tracks: Single track

The Mont Park railway is a former branch line from the Hurstbridge line in Melbourne, Australia. The main line connection was at the up (Melbourne) end of Macleod station, with the line operating between 1911 and 1964.

== History ==
The line was opened in 1911 to serve the Mont Park Asylum complex, with the construction expense met by the government Health Department. Electrification on the line was commissioned on 14 September 1928, five years after that on the main line. Steel stanchions were used to support the overhead wiring, in contrast to the wooden posts then used on single lines of railway in Melbourne.

The Railway (Mont Park Siding) Act of 1946 was passed to permit passenger trains to operate on the line, but this opportunity was never used. The Act was later amended in 1958 for unknown reasons.

The line was officially closed on 30 June 1964.

== Operation ==
The line was built as a single track goods only line. It was built to a 1 in 30 grade, and was unfenced. At the terminus there were three roads in 1953, with a derail block at the down (exit) end. Trains were running weekly on the line by the 1950s, run either with the "Electric Motors" (suburban carriages) from Heidelberg, or the E and L class electric locomotives.

The Staff and Ticket safeworking system was used on the line, but with no tickets to be issued due to the lack of crossing places or signalling staff at the terminus. Staff locked points were provided at the main line junction. In 1953 the main line was using the Electric Staff safeworking system, so a special procedure was required. A freight train would be dispatched from Heidelberg with a 'Heidelberg to Macleod' electric staff. The train then proceeded to the junction, where it would be met by the signalman from Macleod carrying the 'Macleod to Mont Park' train staff. The staffs would be exchanged, the 'Heidelberg to Macleod' staff used to unlock the points so they could be set for the diverge, and the train allowed to proceed to Mont Park with the 'Macleod to Mont Park' staff. The signalman then reset the points to the main line, and returned the 'Heidelberg to Macleod' Electric staff to the Electric staff instrument to allow another train to use the main line. On the return from Mont Park the reverse procedure was carried out.

This complicated manoeuvre was simplified from 1955, when the staff lock on the main line junction points was replaced with a connection to the lever frame in the signal box at Macleod. In December 1958 Electric Staff safeworking on the mainline was replaced by 3 position automatic signals, and duplication was carried out from Rosanna Junction to Macleod.

The Last Train ran on the 23rd of June 1964

== Today ==
From 1966, 898 feet (274 m) of line was kept for the stabling of trains, remaining until the late 1970s at the earliest. The remains of the line beyond this point was lifted in 1970 by the Tramway Museum Society of Victoria for use on their own line, and shallow cuttings on the line were filled in by the landowner.

Between 1977 and 1979 (possibly at the time of Macleod-Greensborough duplication, '79) a "back platform" was constructed at Macleod, the approach to which is approximately on the former Mont Park line alignment. It is a common misconception that the track into the back platform is the remaining section of the Mont Park line formerly used for stabling, but this is not the case, it does not curve in the same direction and is of a different gradient. At the same time as the back platform was constructed, three stabling sidings were built at the up end. The back platform is not used for stabling, although it is often used as a head-shunt for the yard. The path of the line, beyond its crossing of Wungan Street at its intersection with Cherry Street, extends through the bushland adjacent to the Harry Pottage Memorial Park for several hundred metres, much of which is still reasonably visible, albeit overgrown. The only remains other than the alignment are the bases of several overhead wiring poles, as well as one complete pole where the section of track retained for stabling once ended. Land formerly occupied by the Mont Park Asylum is now part of La Trobe University, and private housing developments.
