= Mont Park Asylum =

Heritage-listed former psychiatric hospital in Melbourne, Victoria, Australia

Mont Park Asylum (former)
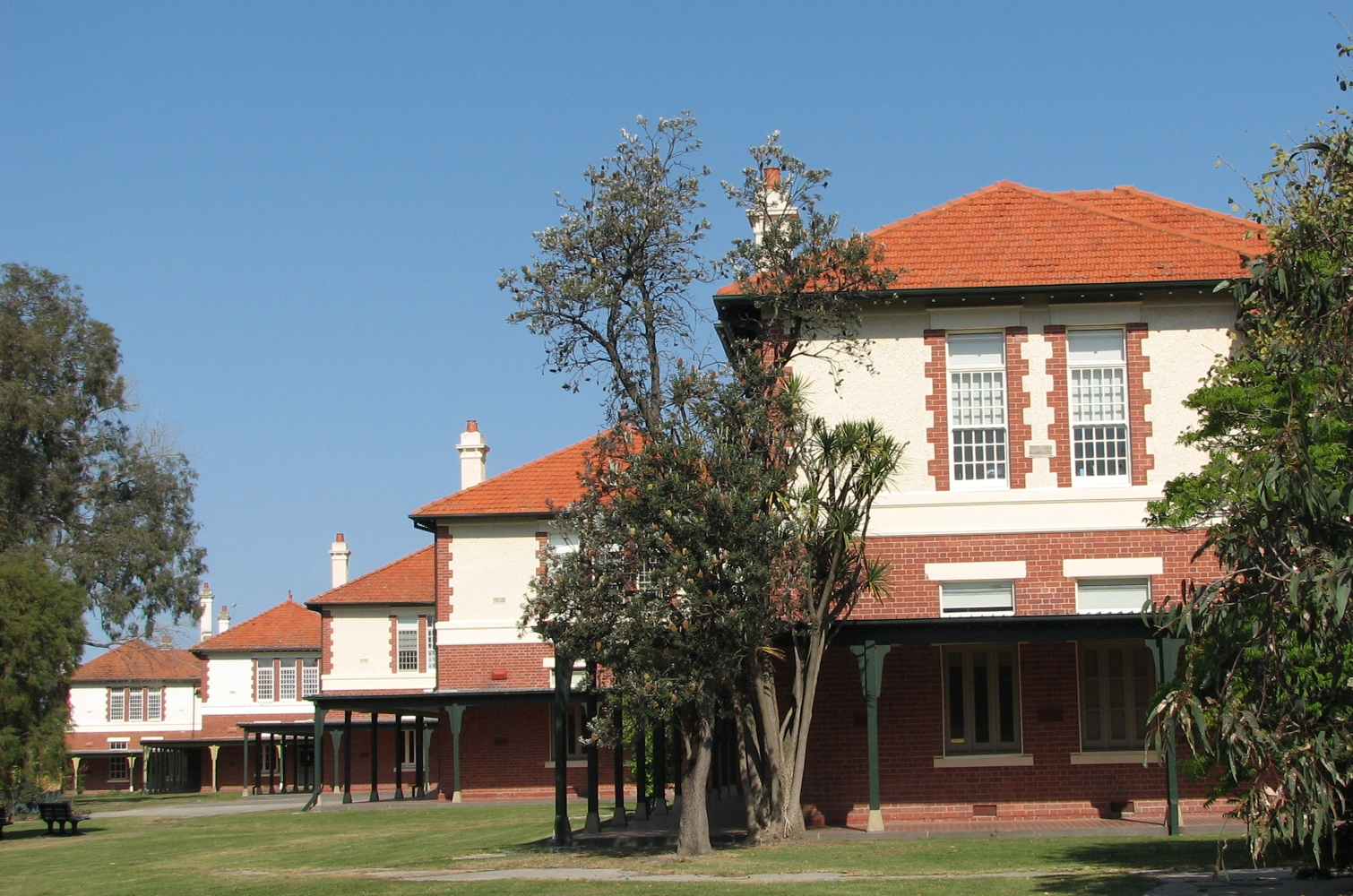
- Former asylum buildings

- Location of the former asylum in Greater Metropolitan Melbourne

Geography
- Location: Macleod, Victoria, Australia
- Coordinates: 37°43′16″S 145°03′33″E

Organisation
- Care system: Medicare; Private
- Type: Psychiatric

History
- Opened: 1912
- Closed: 1990s

Links
- Lists: Hospitals in Australia
- Other links: List of psychiatric hospitals in Australia

Victorian Heritage Register
- Official name: Former Mont Park Asylum
- Type: Registered place
- Designated: 10 August 2000
- Reference no.: H1872
- Categories: Health Services; Monuments and Memorials; Parks, Gardens and Trees

Register of the National Estate
- Official name: Mont Park Psychiatric Hospital Precinct
- Type: Defunct register
- Designated: 24 June 1997
- Reference no.: 100229

The Mont Park Asylum, established in 1912 as the Mont Park Hospital for the Insane, is a former psychiatric hospital located in Macleod, in the City of Darebin, in the northern suburbs of Melbourne, in Victoria, Australia. The former hospital opened in 1912 and closed in the 1990s. Some of the former hospital buildings were used by the La Trobe University for administrative purposes.

Built in 1910 on the traditional lands of the Wurundjeri Woi-wurrung people, the former hospital was added to the Victorian Heritage Register on 10 August 2000 in recognition of its architectural, historical, aesthetic, scientific (horticultural), and social significance; and was also added to non-statutory lists by the Victorian branch of the National Trust on an unknown date and the now defunct Register of the National Estate on 24 June 1997.

== History ==
=== Buildings ===
The construction of the Mont Park Psychiatric Hospital Precinct began in 1905 on undeveloped farmland and wooded hills beyond the edge of urban development in Melbourne. The building of Mont Park represents a significant change in attitude towards the insane. Previous psychiatric institutions were given the title of asylum rather than hospital and the name of the responsible department, the Lunacy Department, did not convey the idea that the inmates were sick people. The site comprising the Mont Park and Strathallen estates was consolidated by the Victorian government by purchase and transfer from the Closer Settlement Board in 1909.

In 1910 the first buildings of the Mont Park Hospital were constructed, namely the Farm Workers' Block (now known as the Kingsbury Centre), for patients who would occupy the farm and close by the head gardener's cottage.

Between 1911–13 constructions at Mont Park included the Paying Patients Wards and an Administration building at Mont Park Hospital (the latter was demolished in c. 1960); the Laundry Workers Building, the Laundry and a Store at Plenty Hospital; and a railway line (subsequently removed).

An agreement was made with the Defence Department in 1914 to erect the Mont Park central block (the "Chronic Wards") for use as a military hospital, and for it later to revert to the State as portion of Mont Park Hospital. The buildings now known as the Chronic Wards were completed in this way in 1916 and used as the Australian General Hospital no. 16 for the duration of the war. One wing of this building was set aside for mental patients during this period.

Other buildings were added to the site in an ad hoc fashion between 1919–1937. They included the Nurses Home (1923), the Hospital Block (1924), the Mortuary (1927), the Ernest Jones (Entertainment) Hall and Chapel (1927), the Isolation Wards (1935) and the Kiosk (1937) at Mont Park Hospital and the Military Mental Hospital (1919) and the Ward Building (1937) at the Plenty Hospital.

The other hospitals were gradually split off from the Mont Park administration to form separate entities. These were the Macleod Repatriation Hospital (1915), the Bundoora Repatriation Hospital (1920), the Gresswell Sanatorium (1933), Larundel Mental Hospital (1938 opened 1951), the Plenty Mental Hospital (1963) and the Kingsbury Training Centre (1974).

The Military Mental Hospital was built in 1919 to accommodate 84 patients who were suffering from psychiatric conditions as a result of their service in World War I. It was occupied by military patients until 1933 when they were transferred to Commonwealth facilities. The Military Mental Hospital consisted of a two-storey brick administration building with two single-storey pavilion wards and a single-storey kitchen-dining room pavilion at the rear, connected with covered ways. The ward sections of the Military Mental Hospital have undergone considerable alteration. A two-storey brick building was constructed in the 1970s in front of the administration block and attached to it at the central porch.

As was typical of the treatment of mental illness in the early twentieth century buildings were dispersed across the site to facilitate the treatment of different classes of patients separately. Buildings were sited parallel to grid lines to minimise earthworks, but otherwise there appears to be little relationship between them in terms of their location. The surroundings of asylums were considered important in the early twentieth century for the treatment of psychiatric patients.

==== Gardens ====
As such, Hugh Linaker was appointed in 1912 as landscape gardener for the Mont Park Hospital. He had previously been Curator of Parks and Gardens for the Municipality of Ararat (1901–12). Linaker also advised other hospitals for the insane in the laying out of the grounds. By 1913 a significant amount of landscaping had been done. Developments included the nursery, gardens, paths, roadways, ornamental displays, a croquet lawn, a large Nymphaea Pond and a large amount of tree planting. An orchard containing over 1,000 fruit trees and 200 gooseberry bushes and other fruits was built prior to 1914. The work of Linaker and his attendants, Hanrahan and Phillips, was highly regarded and often praised by the Acting Medical Superintendent. He reported in 1913 that only one failure in tree planting had been recorded. The Mont Park Nursery, under instruction from Linaker, supplied a large number of plants to other institutions. In 1917 over 20,000 plants were supplied. Linaker also prepared plans for several other institutions including Hospitals for the Insane at Ararat, Ballarat, Beechworth and Sunbury as well as HM Prison Pentridge and Castlemaine Gaol, Ballarat Supreme Court, Preston Shire Hall, and Heidelberg Reserve. Although the arrival of a new man is recorded in 1950, it is thought that Linaker lived at Mont Park until the abolition of the Superintendent's position in 1988.

=== Operation as a hospital ===
Mont Park Hospital for the Insane was opened in April 1912. Its proclamation as a Hospital for the Insane was published in the Government Gazette on the 23 October 1912. First patients admitted to Mont Park were all farm workers and artisans who laid out the farm, roads and gardens. In 1912 at Mont Park there were blacksmiths, workshop employees and 110 carpenters. 212 patients were employed in farming duties and 106 worked in the gardens. Excess produce not required by other asylums was sold. The farm buildings were extensive with hay sheds, store rooms for vegetables, glass houses and pig and calf pens. Only remnants of these buildings remain and are used by La Trobe University as store rooms. These buildings were constructed around a large cobbled basalt courtyard. The largest building was the milking shed, which had a well-laid brick floor, cambered and angled for drainage.

When it opened, Mont Park Hospital was fitted with many facilities far ahead of its time, such as a gymnasium, electrical apparatus for physiotherapy and a Red Cross rest room. Patients not working were confined to their wards or in airing cages, which were small and overcrowded. Patients were restrained using straight jackets, skull caps, locked boots or padded cells.

Farming continued for many years until residential development encroached along Plenty Road and people began to complain in newspapers about the smells coming from the hospital grounds from the vicinity of the milking sheds and piggeries.

In 1915 a ward at Mont Park was taken over as a Convalescent Military Hospital. An agreement was made with the Defence Department for the latter to erect the Mont Park central block for use as a Military Hospital. This hospital was generally referred to as the Military Mental Hospital. It was also variously known as the Military Mental Block. Apparently, ex-military personnel with chronic psychiatric illness were housed there. The military block at Mont Park was closed in 1924 and handed back to the State for civilian mental cases.

Mont Park also had its own separate hospital for any of the patients' medical and/or surgical needs, called MSU (Medical Surgical Unit). The MSU were staffed by general nurse's who had little to no mental health training, leading to abuse of the patients receiving medical care.

The hospital was closed in the late-1990s. Mont Park was closely linked with Plenty Valley Repatriation Psychiatric Hospital and Larundel Psychiatric Hospital, which both closed in the late 1990s. These sites were also redeveloped.

=== Subsequent use ===
The complex was served by the freight only Mont Park railway branch line.

The vacant land was used for the establishment of La Trobe University in 1967. It is now the site of Springthorpe Housing Development. Part of the old patient hospital is occupied by La Trobe University for administrative offices.

In 2004, Film Australia and SBS screened the documentary Troubled Minds - The Lithium Revolution, a 60-minute documentary that portrayed Dr John Cade's discovery of the benefits of using lithium salts as a mood stabiliser for treating patients impacted by bipolar disorder. The buildings of Mont Park were used as a setting for the documentary.

Several buildings at the former site were also used as filming locations for the Garingal Juvenile Justice Centre in Chris Lilley's mockumentaries Angry Boys and Jonah from Tonga.

The hospital was mentioned by the author Gerald Murnane in his story, Stream System.

== Description ==
The site consists of seven hospitals spread over 185 hectares (460 acres) and included both the former Mont Park Psychiatric Hospital and the former Bundoora Repatriation Hospital. The Ernest Jones Hall, named after the Inspector General of the Victorian Lunacy Department, was a combined chapel and entertainment hall constructed 1927-1930 in the Spanish Mission style. The Avenue of Honour planted in 1919 consists of a row of 46 Sugar Gums planted by returned soldiers who were hospitalized in the number 16 Australian General Hospital (Chronic Wards) at Mont Park. Further plantings were made after World War II.

The Mont Park Psychiatric Hospital Precinct is a small part of the original Mont Park Estate. The original estate included a number of hospitals, namely the Macleod Repatriation Hospital, the Bundoora Repatriation Hospital, the Gresswell Sanatorium and Larundel Mental Hospital, that, since World War Two, have gradually split off from the Mont Park administration to form separate entities. The Mont Park Psychiatric Hospital Precinct, for the purpose of the Register of the National Estate, consists of three psychiatric institutions and their grounds. The institutions are the Mont Park Hospital, which is the largest, the Kingsbury Centre and Plenty Hospital.

== See also ==
- Architecture of Melbourne
- List of psychiatric hospitals in Australia
- List of places on the Victorian Heritage Register in the City of Darebin
