= Macleod railway station =

Railway station in Melbourne, Australia

Macleod
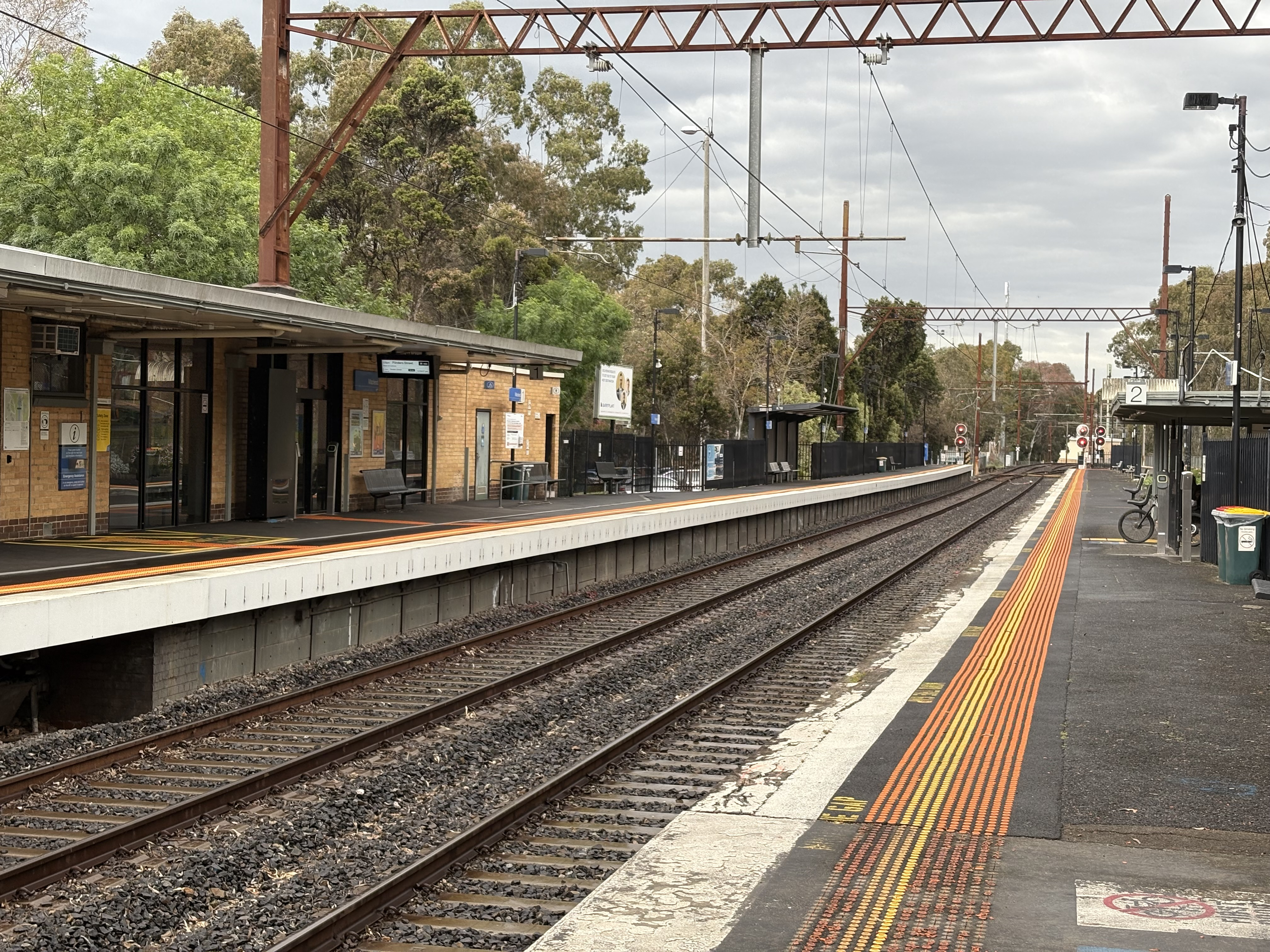
- Southbound view from Platform 2, September 2025

General information
- Location: Birdwood Avenue, Macleod, Victoria 3085; City of Banyule; Australia
- Coordinates: 37°43′34″S 145°04′09″E
- System: PTV commuter rail station
- Owner: VicTrack
- Operator: Metro Trains
- Line: Hurstbridge
- Distance: 17.71 kilometres from Southern Cross
- Platforms: 3 (1 island and 1 side)
- Tracks: 3
- Connections: Bus

Construction
- Structure type: Ground
- Parking: 102
- Cycle facilities: Yes
- Accessible: Yes—step free access

Other information
- Status: Operational, premium station
- Station code: MCD
- Fare zone: Myki zone 2
- Website: Public Transport Victoria

History
- Opened: 1 March 1911; 115 years ago
- Rebuilt: 11 August 1979
- Electrified: April 1923 (1500 V DC overhead)

Passengers
- 2005–2006: 418,132
- 2006–2007: 430,743 ▲3.01%
- 2007–2008: 485,657 ▲12.74%
- 2008–2009: 512,000 ▲5.42%
- 2009–2010: 507,000 ▼0.97%
- 2010–2011: 575,000 ▲13.4%
- 2011–2012: 622,000 ▲8.17%
- 2012–2013: Not measured
- 2013–2014: 503,000 ▼19.13%
- 2014–2015: 508,092 ▲1.01%
- 2015–2016: 588,742 ▲15.87%
- 2016–2017: 574,758 ▼2.37%
- 2017–2018: 562,101 ▼2.2%
- 2018–2019: 598,600 ▲6.49%
- 2019–2020: 469,500 ▼21.57%
- 2020–2021: 204,450 ▼56.5%
- 2021–2022: 239,150 ▲16.97%

Services
| Preceding station | Metro Trains | Following station |
|---|---|---|
| Rosanna towards Flinders Street | Hurstbridge line | Watsonia towards Hurstbridge |
| Rosanna towards Flinders Street | Hurstbridge line | Terminus |
Former services
| Preceding station | Disused railways | Following station |
|---|---|---|
| Junction | Mont Park branch | Mont Park |
| | List of closed railway stations in Melbourne | |
Track layout
Location

Macleod station is a railway station operated by Metro Trains Melbourne on the Hurstbridge line, part of the Melbourne rail network. It serves the north-eastern suburb of Macleod, in Melbourne, Victoria, Australia. Macleod station is a ground level premium station, featuring three platforms, an island platform with two faces and one side platform. It opened on 1 March 1911, with the current station provided in 1979.

== History ==
Macleod station was completed by November 1910, and was opened to traffic on 1 March 1911.

The station is named after Malcolm Anderson Macleod, a prominent local resident, whose wife Edith Jessie Macleod purchased land in the area. The press of the time credited Edith Macleod's husband with owning the land but this was not the case. A thin strip of Macleod's land measuring 31.51 hectares was sold to the State Government to enable the construction of a branch line for the Mont Park Psychiatric Hospital. The timing and methods by which the strip of land was acquired for the railway line was likely corrupt. The land transfer was examined as part of the 1909 Royal Commission on the Acquisition of Certain Estates by Sir Thomas Bent which found that the Crown had paid too much for it.

After the land acquisition, engineers discovered that the acquired land was too steep to accommodate the proposed railway line, so a land swap had to be arranged between Edith Macleod and the Crown for some of her remaining land holdings nearby. The land swap was enabled by the Mont Park Land Act 1910 (Vic.), which finally enabled the construction of the freight-only Mont Park branch line from Macleod station to the asylum in a north-westerly direction. From 1911 to 1964, Macleod was the junction of the Mont Park branch line.

Newspaper articles from the time claim that Malcolm Macleod conceived of the idea of the railway station at Macleod by stipulating that it had to be built at that location and under his name in return for the land transfer, however a reservation for the railway station had been in place since the Board of Land and Works had acquired land for a railway line in 1894 and it has been demonstrated that the railway station was not his idea. The original proposal was to name the station "Mont Park".

In 1979, the present day Platform 3 was provided on an alignment near the former branch line alignment, as were three stabling sidings immediately to the south of the station, both coinciding with the duplication of the railway line between Macleod and Greensborough. A number of train services terminate at Macleod, before proceeding to the sidings to stable.

In 2001, Macleod was upgraded to a premium station.

On 25 October 2022, the Level Crossing Removal Project announced that the Ruthven Street level crossing, located nearby in the up direction of the station, will be grade separated by 2027, with the railway line to be rebuilt over the road.

== Facilities, platforms and services ==
Macleod station at night looking northbound from the southbound platform

Macleod has one island platform with two faces and one side platform. Platform 1 has an enclosed waiting area, ticket facilities, a Protective Services Officer pod and toilets.

It is serviced by Metro Trains' Hurstbridge line services.

Macleod platform arrangement
| Platform | Line | Destination | Service Type | Notes | Source |
|---|---|---|---|---|---|
| 1 | Hurstbridge line | Flinders Street | All stations and limited express services | | |
| 2 | Hurstbridge line | Greensborough, Eltham, Hurstbridge | All stations services | | |
| 3 | Hurstbridge line | Flinders Street | All stations and terminating services | Terminating platform for Macleod services | |

== Transport links ==
Kinetic Melbourne operates one route via Macleod station, under contract to Transport Victoria:

- 561 : Macleod – Pascoe Vale station

== Gallery ==
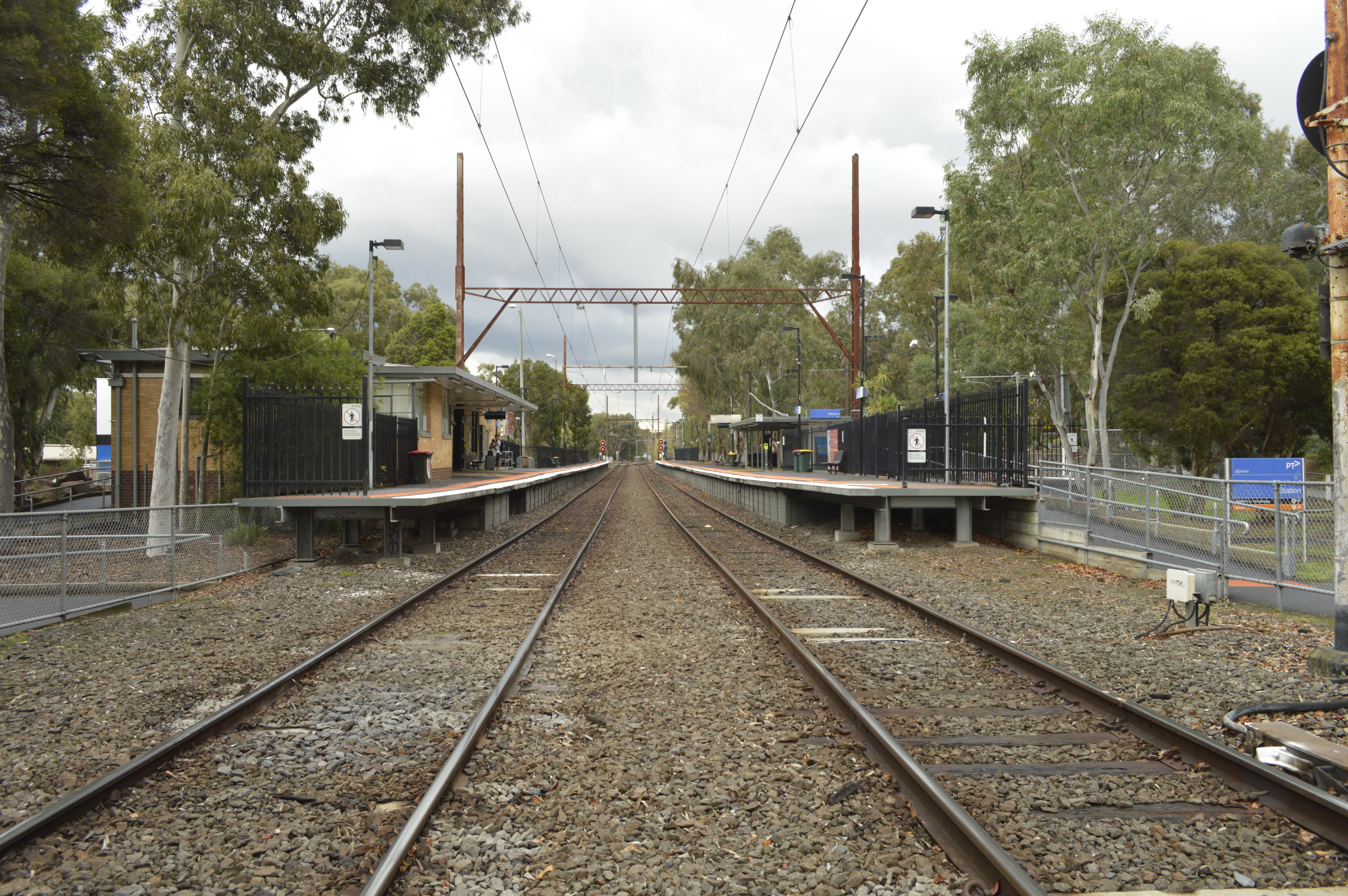
Southbound view of the station platforms, May 2014

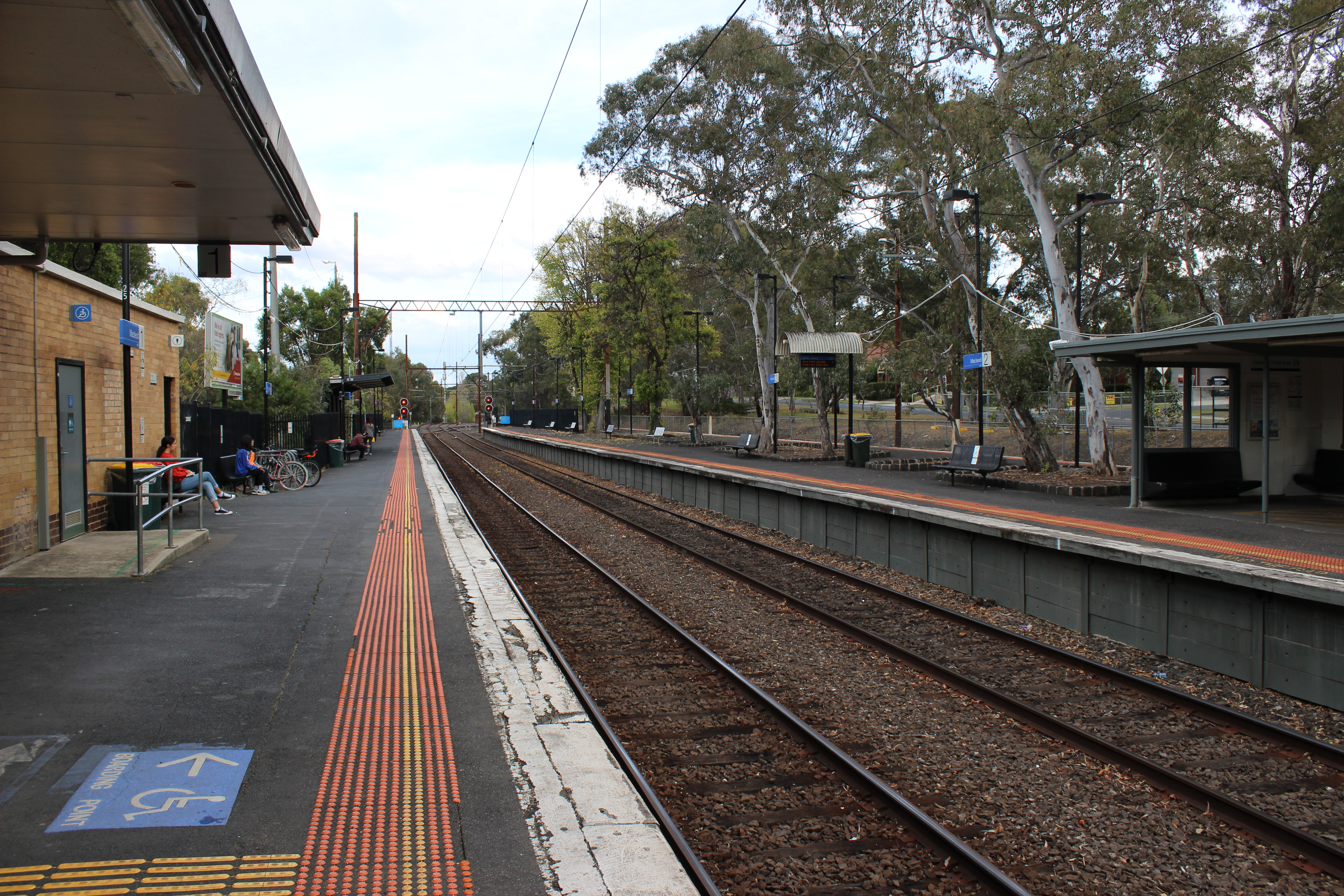
Southbound view from Platform 1, May 2018

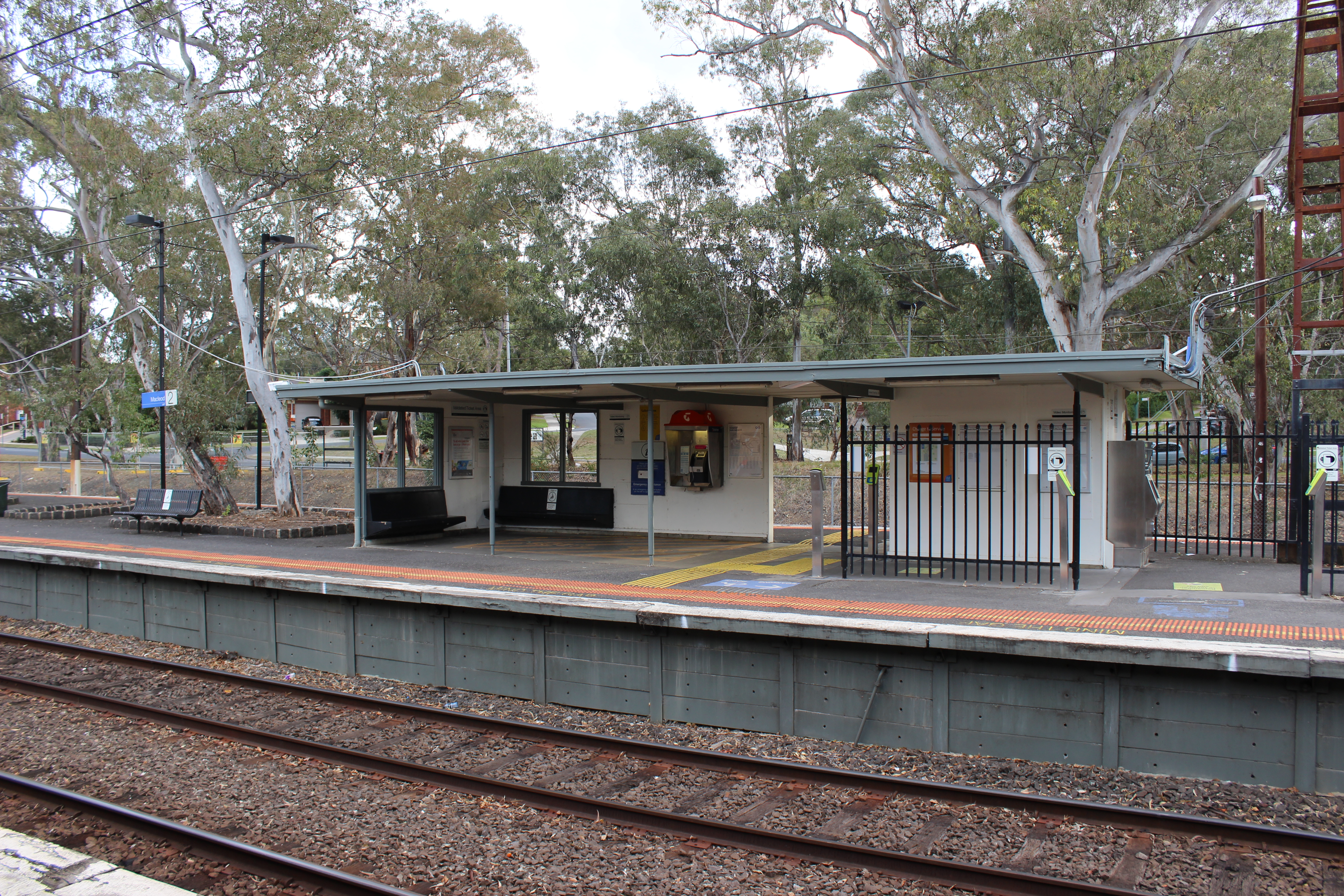
Station shelter on Platforms 2 and 3, May 2018

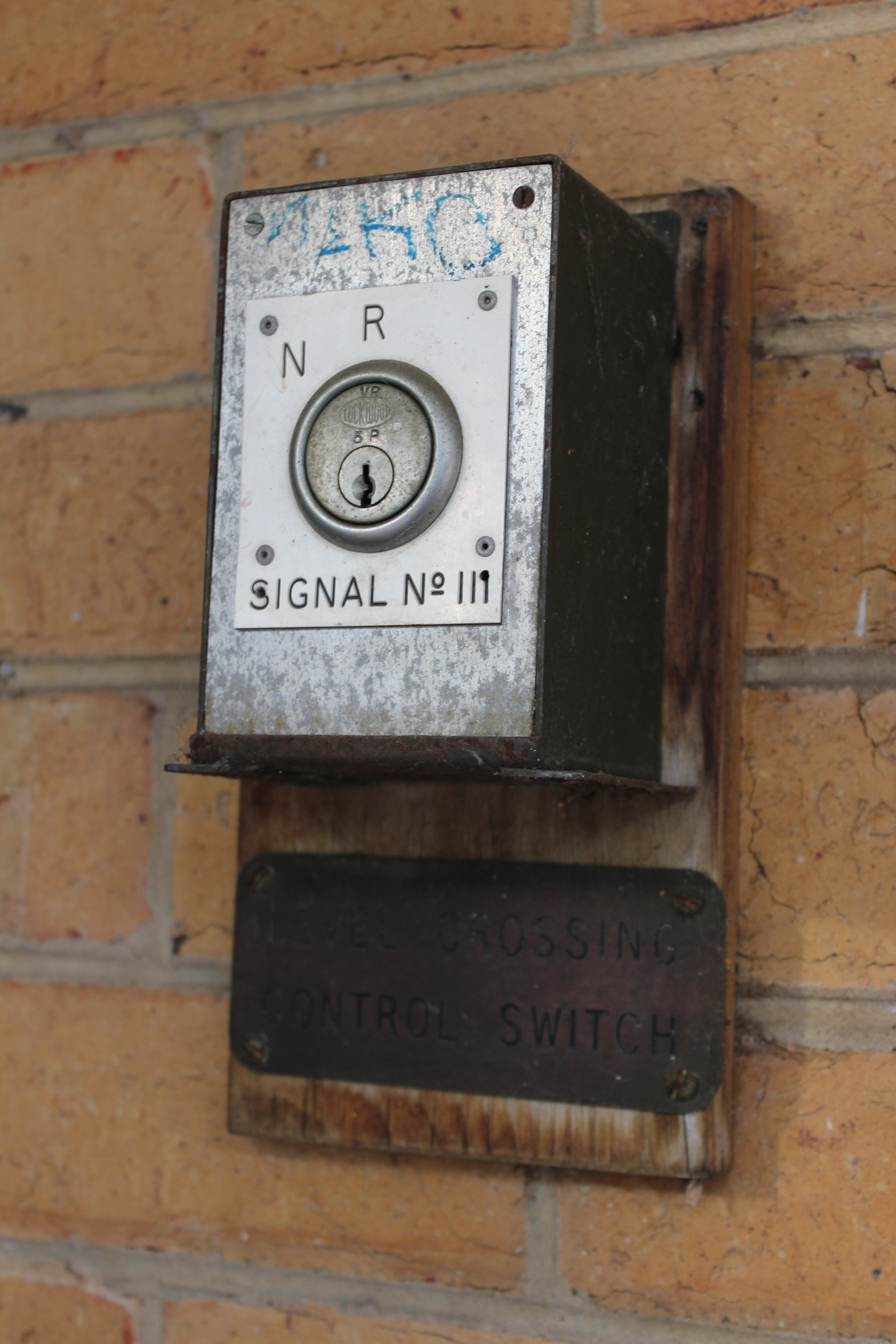
A Victorian Railways signal key attached to the Platform 1 building, May 2018

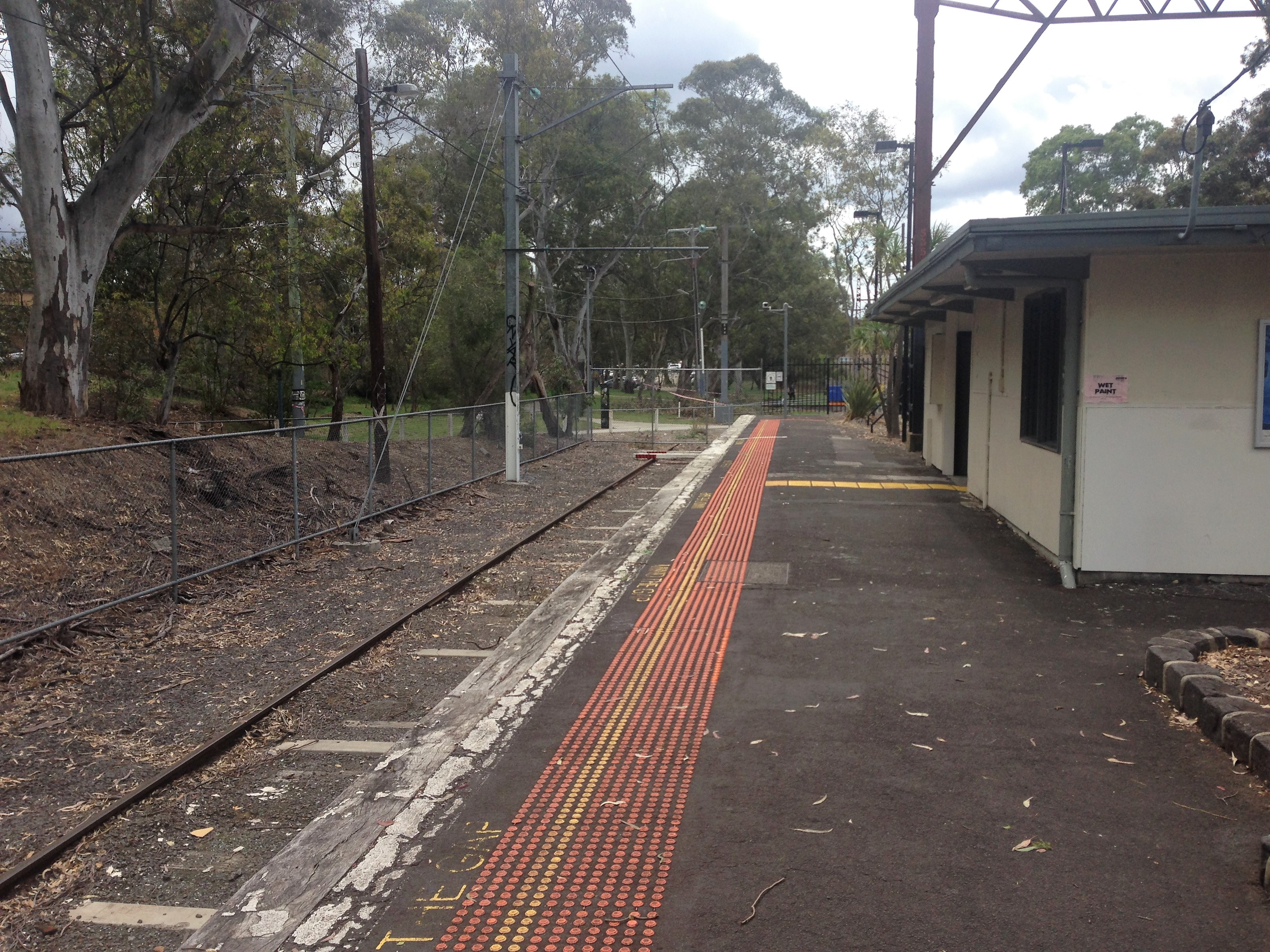
Northbound view from Platform 3, November 2018
