= Ellison Harvie =

Australian architect

- Born: 18 May 1902; Prahran, Victoria, Australia
- Died: 27 September 1984 (aged 82); East Melbourne, Victoria, Australia
- Education: University of Melbourne
- Occupation: Architect
- Parent(s): Alice Edington Harvie, née Marshall; Robert William Harvie

(Edythe) Ellison Harvie (18 May 1902 – 27 September 1984) was an Australian architect and an advocate for the professional development of women. In 1938, she became the first Australian woman to graduate with a Diploma of Architectural Design. Four years later she became the first woman to be elected to an Australian Architectural Institute council in 1942, as well as the first female Fellow of the Royal Victorian Institute of Architects in 1946. That same year, she became the first Australian woman to become a partner in a large firm.

Harvie was recognised as an expert in hospital planning and administration, working on numerous Australian projects, including Mercy Hospital in East Melbourne (1934–36) and the original four multi-storey buildings of the Royal Melbourne Hospital (1936–41).

== Early life and education ==
Harvie was born on 18 May 1902 in Prahran, Melbourne. Her parents were Robert William Harvie (3 January 1868 – 5 October 1922), a photographer, and his wife Alice Edington Harvie, née Marshall.

Robert William Harvie is notable in the history of Australian movie photography for filming in 1897 both the Caulfield and Melbourne Cups, developing the film and showing them the same evening at the Melbourne Opera House.

As a child, Harvie was fascinated by architecture and encouraged by her father. After having attended Warwick, a girls' school in East Malvern, she sought to gain employment as an articled assistant at a Melbourne practice. However, as she was unsuccessful, she enrolled at Swinburne Technical College in 1920 and continued her architectural training there for three years.

In 1921, she was invited by her lecturer Arthur Stephenson to join his newly established firm and serve her articles there. The firm, formed with Percy Meldrum, specialised in the design of hospitals, public housing developments and commercial developments. After graduating from Swinburne Technical College, she travelled to Europe to broaden her architectural knowledge and to learn about the latest trends and techniques in architecture. In 1925 she returned to Melbourne, where she completed her articles at Stephenson & Meldrum. It was at this time that she also attended the Architectural Atelier at the University of Melbourne, where she studied until 1928. Along with other architects at the Atelier, such as Margaret Pitt Morison, the course prepared articled students for the Royal Victorian Institute of Architects qualifying exams. Harvie won both the University of Melbourne's Atelier award and the President's Prize for best student work in 1927. In 1938 Harvie became the first Australian female recipient of a Diploma of Architectural Design.

== Career ==
Harvie registered with the Royal Victorian Institute of Architects in 1926 and was elected an associate in 1928. The same year that she registered, Stephenson & Meldrum appointed her architect in charge of the Jessie McPherson Wing of the Queen Victoria Hospital in Lonsdale Street, Melbourne. She would go on to contribute to every hospital project the firm worked on in Melbourne and Sydney during the 1930s, leading the work on St Vincent's Hospital (1933), Mercy Hospital (1934–36) and Freemasons Hospital (1935).

As Stephenson & Meldrum's international reputation grew, its restructuring into Stephenson & Turner in 1937 saw Harvie being made an associate of the firm. In this new role she became responsible for running the Melbourne headquarters while a new office in Sydney was being established. When war broke out in 1945 however, Harvie effectively ran both practices. She was made a partner of the firm- the first Australian woman to do so in a large practice. As well as qualifying as an accountant, she developed a new building contract that could adjust to the economic instability of the time.

Throughout the remainder of her career, Harvie cultivated a high public profile as a successful female architect, being mostly involved in large commercial and civic projects, rather than in residential architecture (the traditional domain of female architects). She was a strong advocate for the professional development of women and for their participation in public life. Melbourne's Lyceum Clubrooms (1959) and St Hilda's College (1963), Melbourne University, two of her few private commissions, were built to specifically serve women and clearly demonstrate the strong influence of International Modernism in her work.

Harvie sat on the committees of the Royal Victorian Institute of Architects from 1929 and was a member of the Royal Institute of British Architects. Frustrated with the lack of architectural appreciation in Australia, she served on the Royal Victorian Institute of Architects Board of Architectural Education from 1946 until 1956 and on the board of the University of Melbourne's Faculty of Architecture from 1945 until 1973. In 1942 she became the first woman to be elected to an Australian Architectural Institute council and, later, was a life fellow of the Royal Australian Institute of Architects. She continued to work on hospitals until her retirement from full-time practice in 1968.

Harvie died at East Melbourne on 27 September 1984 and was buried in Boroondara cemetery, Kew.
