= Bend of Islands =

Bend of Islands Victoria
- Coordinates: 37.704°S 145.267°E
- Population: 267 (2021 census)
- Established: 2000
- Postcode(s): 3097
- Location: 30 km (19 mi) from Melbourne
- LGA(s): Shire of Nillumbik
- State electorate(s): Eildon
- Federal division(s): Casey
Localities around Bend of Islands:
Christmas Hills	Christmas Hills	Yarra Glen
Kangaroo Ground	Bend of Islands	Yering
Wonga Park	Chirnside Park	Coldstream

Bend of Islands is a locality in Victoria, Australia, 30 km north-east of Melbourne's Central Business District, located within the Shire of Nillumbik local government area. Bend of Islands recorded a population of 267 at the 2021 census.

It is situated on about 635 hectares and is named after a group of small islands at a bend of the Yarra River near Watsons Creek. It is located near the town of Kangaroo Ground. The location was a favourite spot for local anglers in 1939. About 130 allotments range from a half to 12 hectares. Exotic animals, including cats and dogs and vegetation are banned to minimise the spread of weeds, damage to the soil and harm to native fauna.

It was gazetted in 2000 after a petition from local residents, having previously been part of Christmas Hills and Kangaroo Ground.

Jessie and Edward Haughton built Three Bears Cottage which is considered significant as the last built connection with the regionally significant family who were instrumental in shaping the local landscape and subsequent bush lifestyle from the 1930s. The Haughton's used to have swimming parties in the swimming pool on the bend in the river. Other significant residents of Bend of Islands in the 1970s included Neil Douglas and Helen (Abbie) Heathcote whose house at 512 Henley Road is included on the Victorian Heritage Database. Artist and naturalist Neil Douglas and others purchased properties following bushfires in 1962 and further established the area for residents.

The Burns House, known as Kangaroo, was designed by architect and artist Peter Burns and was built in stages from 1968 on an elevated sloping bush land site. It is considered of architectural and historical significance to the State of Victoria.

The area has been under threat a number of times including in 1980 when the Government of Victoria considered buying it as part of a conservation area while bulldozers began clearing natural bushland at the same time.

The Bend of Islands incorporates the area of the former Environmental Living Zone, now known as Special Use Zone (SUZ) - Environmental Living in the Nillumbik Planning Scheme. The Bend of Islands Conservation Association (BICA) was formed in the 1960s.

Residents Neil Douglas and Abbie Heathcote used to open their home to exhibit their art. This practice became the foundation for the Nillumbik Artists Open studios program. Local artists continue to be part of the program. The Bend of Island Community members, or 'benders', are a thriving and connected community with monthly coffee mornings at the local fire station, weekly BICA events such as bird or flora walks, and a large artistic community.

A mobile library service visits nearby Kangaroo Ground which is managed by Yarra Plenty Regional Library.
