= Stephenson and Turner =

Australia 20th century architectural partnership

Originally known as Stephenson and Meldrum (1921–1937), Stephenson and Turner (1938–1995) was a prominent Australian architectural firm, best known for the pioneering modernism of their numerous hospital designs of the 1930s and 1940s.

== Percy Meldrum ==
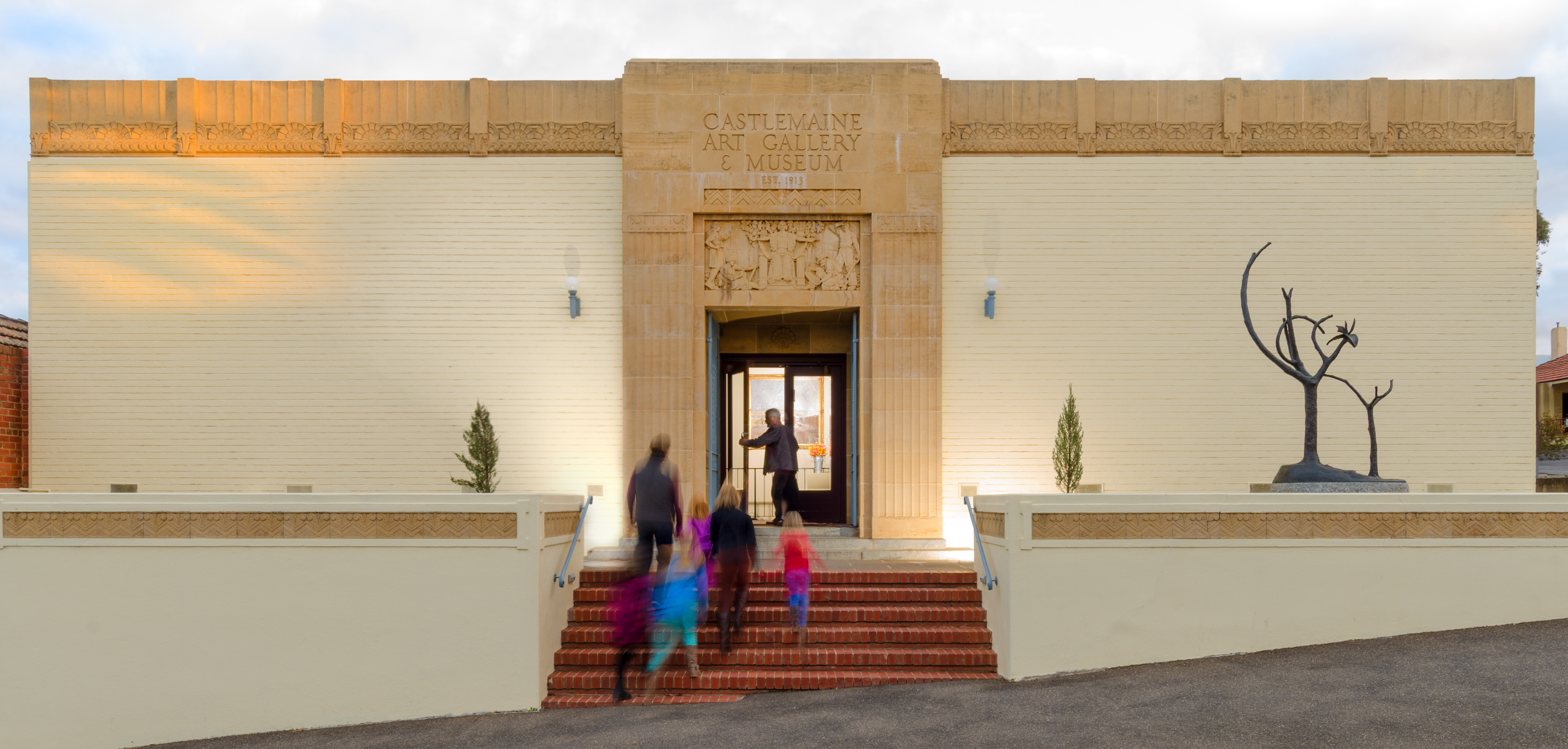
Entrance of the Castlemaine Art Museum in 2017.

Percy Hayman Meldrum (1887–1968), architect, born in 1887 at Casterton, Victoria and educated at Ballarat College. In 1907 he studied architecture and articled to Melbourne Architect A. A. Fritsch from 1907 until 1913, where he won the Royal Victorian Institute of Architects Bronze Medal.

In 1913 Meldrum travelled to Chicago and admired the architecture of Frank Lloyd Wright. Then travelled to England in 1914 and worked with the War Office designing aircraft hangars. In 1919 Meldrum joined the AA, where he met and taught Arthur Stephenson and Donald Turner. In 1930 he designed the Castlemaine Art Museum building in an Art Deco style. A fine draftsman and watercolorist, Meldrum was the artistic director and collaborated with some of Melbourne's prominent artists, including Napier Waller, whose mosaic featured on the façade of the Newspaper House in Melbourne (1933). When businessman and philanthropist Russell Grimwade provided funds for Cook's Cottage to be deconstructed and shipped from Hull and re-erected in Melbourne's Fitzroy Gardens, the reconstruction project was supervised by Meldrum.

Stephenson and Meldrum's partnership ended in 1937, with Meldrum moving on to practice with Arthur Noad, to form Meldrum and Noad. That year he became a foundation member of, and exhibited with, Robert Menzies' anti-modernist organisation, the Australian Academy of Art. His son James became a non-objective, surrealist painter and lecturer in art at RMIT.

== Arthur George Stephenson ==
Arthur George Stephenson (1890–1967), architect, born in 1890 in Box Hill, Melbourne. In 1907 Stephenson worked for Swansson Brothers while studying construction at the Working Men's College. He joined the Australian Imperial Force in 1915 as a lieutenant, promoted to captain and awarded the Military Cross. After World War I, Stephenson remained in London and studied at the Architectural Association School (AA) under Percy Hayman Meldrum and joined the Royal Institute of British Architects (RIBA) in 1920. He returned to Melbourne and formed a partnership with Meldrum in 1921, known as Stephenson & Meldrum.

Stephenson was largely responsible for the firm's direction to specialize in hospital design. He also lectured, wrote widely and was a member of numerous committees, including the International Hospitals Federation, the Hospital Advisory Council (Melbourne) and a trustee of the National Museum of Victoria. In 1954 Stephenson was knighted for services to architecture and was the first Australian to receive a RIBA Gold Medal in 1964. The Royal Australian Institute of Architects awarded him a gold medal in 1963 and was made honorary fellow by the American Institute of Architects in 1964.

== Donald Turner ==
Donald Turner (1895–1964), architect, was born in Maitland, New South Wales. He began his architectural career as a student with Ross & Rowe in 1912. In 1915 he enlisted in the First All and served as captain until 1919 with the Field Artillery in Egypt and France. After World War I he also studied at the AA in London where he met Arthur Stephenson and Percy Meldrum. Turner joined the RIBA in 1921 and was appointed assistant architect for the Imperial War Graves Commission. Returning to Melbourne in 1924, he joined Stephenson and Meldrum and was promoted to director in 1936. With Meldrum's departure in 1937 the firm's name changed to become Stephenson and Turner in 1938.

== Projects ==
=== Hospitals ===
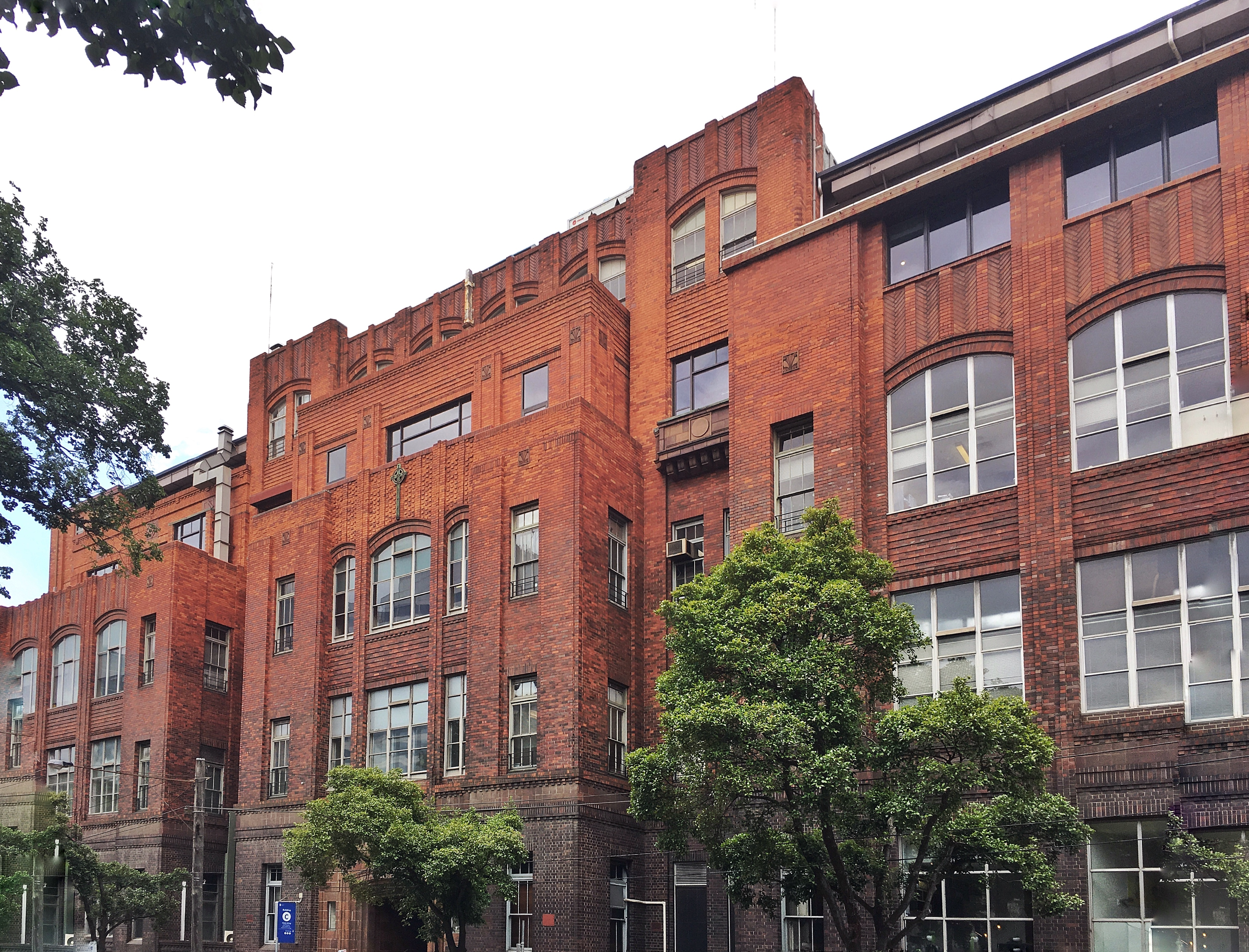
St Vincent's Hospital Healy Wing 1934

Stephenson's firm designed most of the major hospitals built in Australia in the 1930s. Robin Boyd wrote in his book, Victorian Modern (1947), "hospitals gave modern architecture in Australia its first big break". The early 20th century saw advancements in medical technology and treatments, which transformed hospitals into a symbol of modern and healthy society. Stephenson took full advantage of this and traveled to America in 1926–7 to research the most modern developments in hospital design and equipment. They immediately embarked on a number of hospital commissions, such as the Wangaratta Base Hospital, the Jesse McPherson wing of the Queen Victoria Hospital then located in William Street, and a large campus for 'crippled children' for the children's hospital at Somers. The firm's first major city hospital commission was the Healy Wing at St Vincent's Hospital in Fitzroy, where Stephenson provided efficient planning and accommodation of modern medical technology. All these hospitals were designed in eclectic styles typical of American hospitals, St Vincent's being the most adventurous – the design of 1928 was a massive block with arched windows at each end and columns flanking the entrance, a design which evolved when it was finally built in 1931–34 taking on some more Art Deco characteristics of a stepped skyscraper profile and patterned brickwork that varied from dark at the base to light on the top storeys.

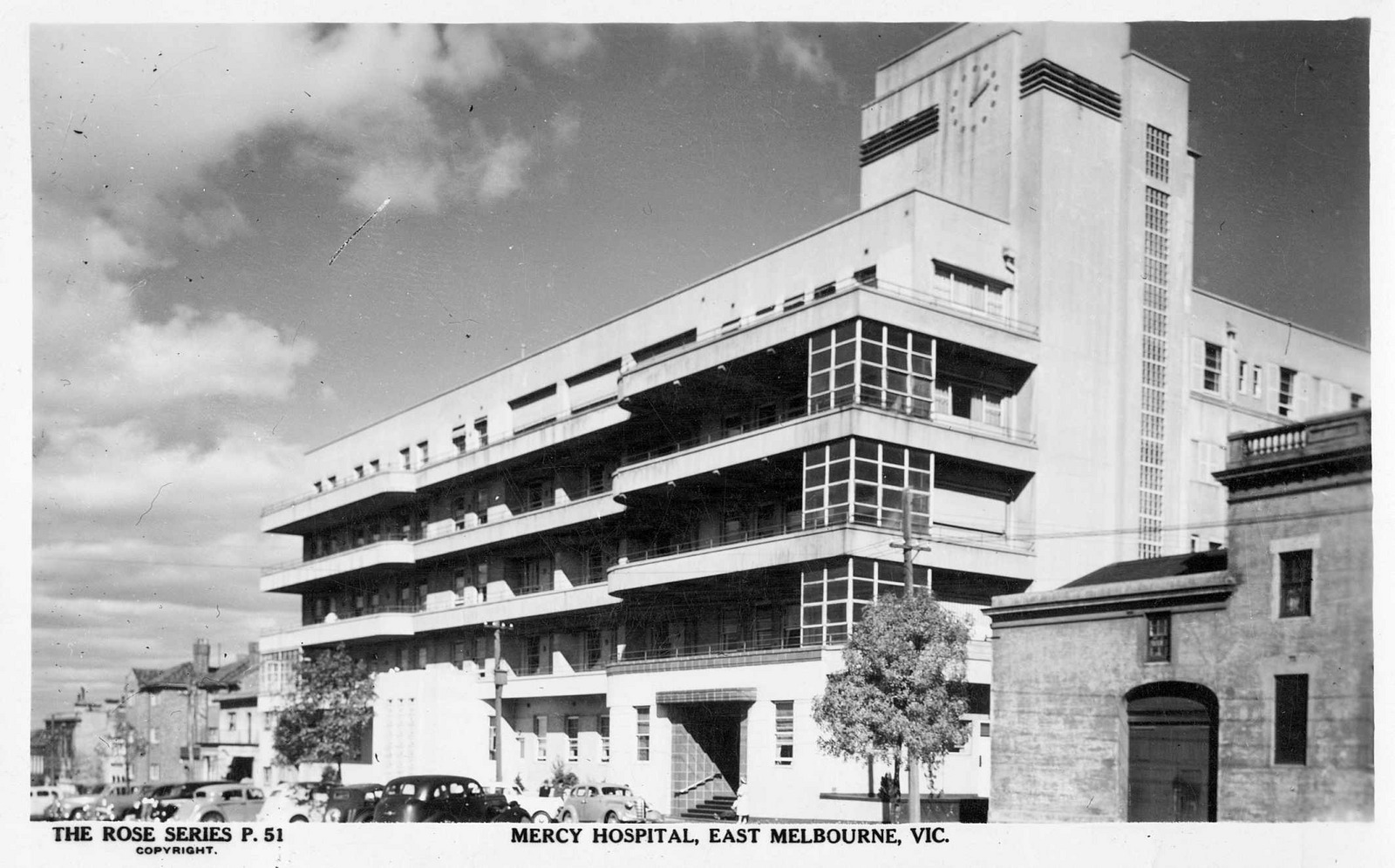
Mercy Hospital, East Melbourne 1934

It wasn't until after Stephenson's second research trip in 1932–33 to continental Europe that hospital design in Australia drastically changed. Stephenson was inspired by European Modernism, particularly Bijvoet and Jan Duiker's Zonnestraal Sanatorium (1928) in the Netherlands, and the Paimio Sanatorium (1929–33) in Finland by Alvar Aalto, which Stephenson described as a way "to express in the simplest form the function of the building in the most appropriate materials". Their next project, the Mercy Hospital (1934-5), introduced a completely new aesthetic : a six-level reinforced-concrete building with stark white sweeping cantilevered balconies that allowed for sun control and outdoor space for patients. The efficiency of the design was described by Professor John Freeland as "clean-cut with the precision of a machine".

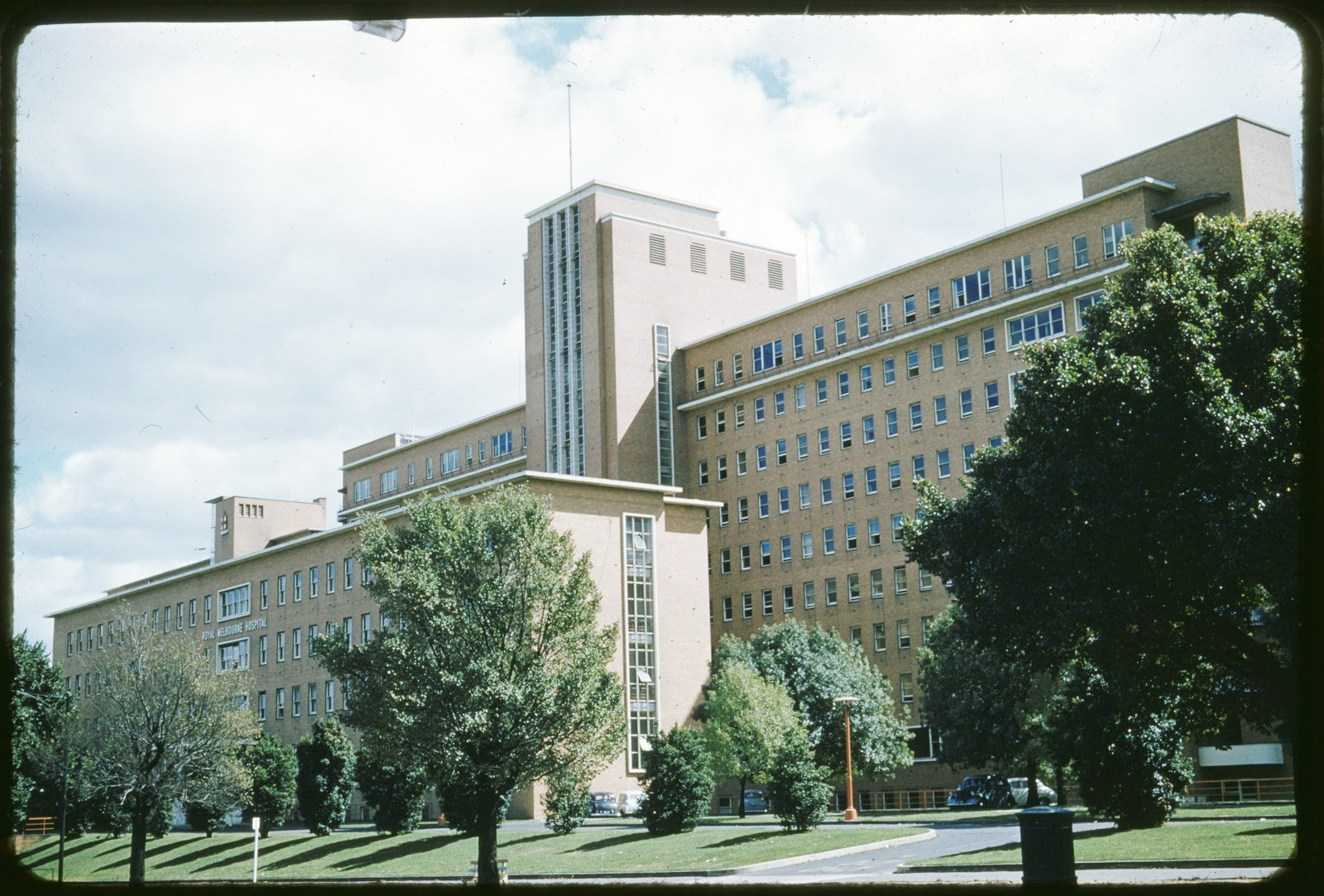
Royal Melbourne Hospital

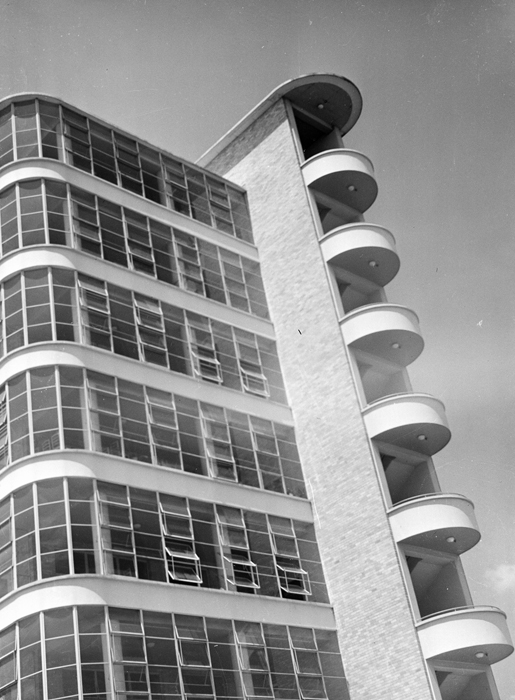
Concord Repatriation General Hospital, Sydney

The success of the Mercy was followed by a succession of hospital commissions in Australia for Stephenson and Meldrum (replaced by Turner in 1937), most featuring long sweeping horizontal balconies with curved corners on a body of cream brick, a streamlined ‘functionalist’ idiom. The Freemason's Hospital (1936) in East Melbourne, defined by its horizontal balconies, was followed by the tall wedge-shaped United Dental Hospital (1940) in Sydney, and the rectilinear Pathology Block at the Royal Women's Hospital in Melbourne in 1941. In 1936 they began designing the new Royal Melbourne Hospital in Parkville, completed in 1942, which served as an American military hospital during World War II (returned to civilian use in 1944). The front façade design departed from the sweeping horizontality that Stephenson's hospitals were known for; instead they opted for a simple and pared back International Style, though the rear facade did include their signature sweeping white horizontal balconies.

While work on the Royal Melbourne Hospital was underway, they also designed for Sydney the King George V Hospital for Mothers and Babies (1939–41), which features the sweeping horizontal balconies on the front facades, and the Concord Repatriation General Hospital, completed in 1942, which repeated the design of the Royal Melbourne, with a plain front dominated by a tower elements, and the sweeping balconies on the rear, but more visible than on the tight Melbourne site.

=== International expositions ===
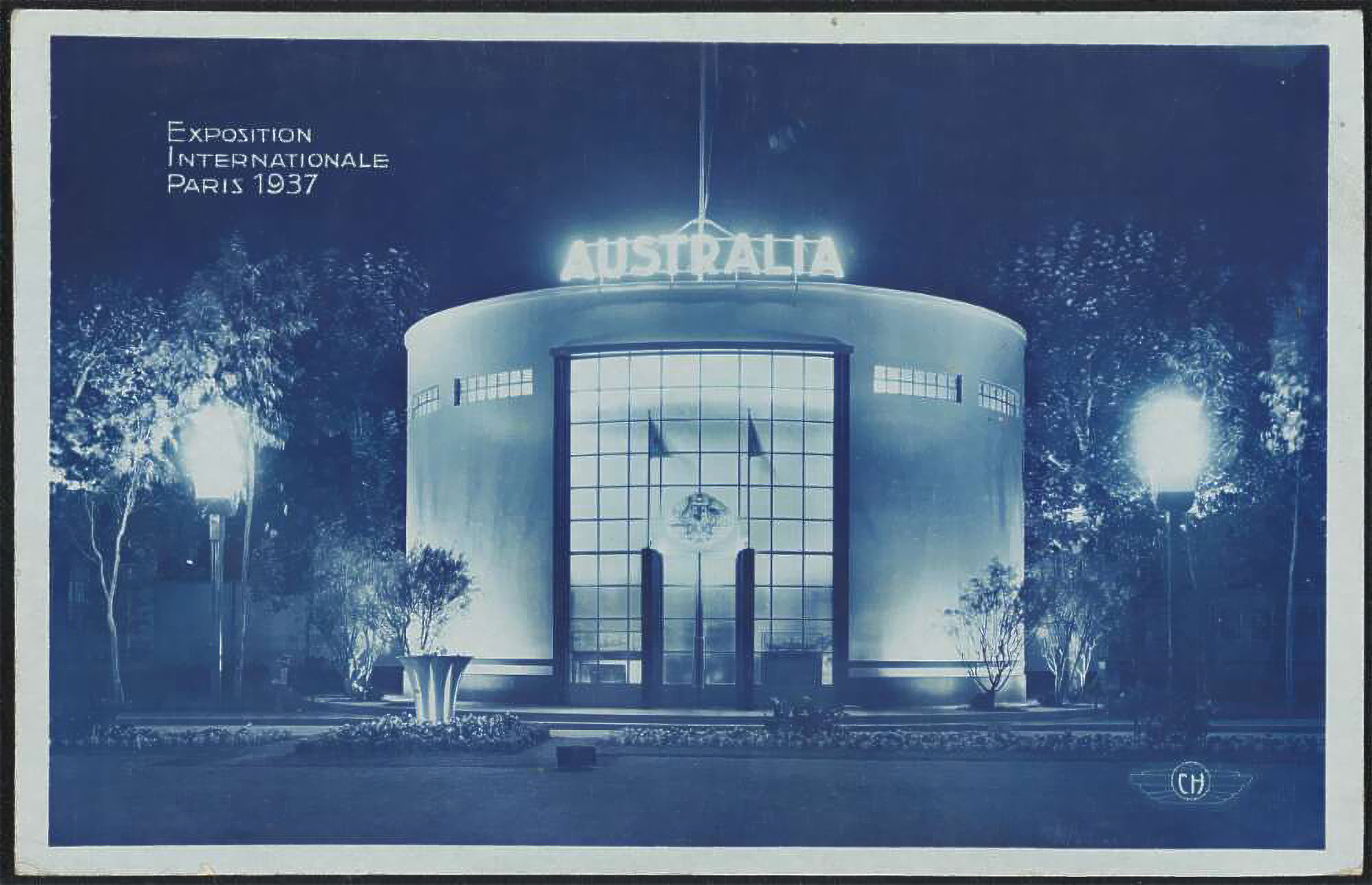
H. Chipault, Pavillon de l'Australie, Exposition Internationale, Paris, 1937, postcard. Jim Davidson Australian postcard collection, National Library of Australia

Stephenson and Turner designed the Australian pavilions at three international exhibitions, which demonstrated both his commitment to Modernism and the firms status. The Australian pavilion at the International Exposition of Arts & Technology in Modern Life in Paris (1937), was a stark cylinder, while the Australian Pavilion at the New Zealand Centennial Exhibition in Wellington, New Zealand in 1940, was an essay in intersecting volumes, with a bold stylised classical portico. The 1939 New York World's Fair work was an interior design only, as it was an attached wing of the British Pavilion (Stanley Hall & Easton and Robertson) and was noted for collaborations with artists and photographers to create a dynamic modern experience; the United States honoured Stephenson with citizenship for his work.

=== After World War II ===
Stephenson and Turner were closely involved in the post-war manufacturing revolution in Australia, designing plants for Holden in Dandenong, Ford, BHP, Fibremakers as well as Australia's first experimental nuclear reactor in Lucas Heights for the Atomic Energy Commission. They applied the same rigorous approach to researching and engaging with state of the art technologies and methods of manufacturing. Their design for the General Motors Holden Factory complex (1954–56) in Dandenong featured a curtain wall to the administration building.

As well as major buildings in every capital city in Australia, in New Zealand, and a hospital in Basra, Iraq, Stephenson and Turner grew to become the largest Australian architecture firm of its time, with 300–400 staff at its peak. They opened offices internationally in Singapore (1949), New Zealand (1956) and Hong Kong. Around this time, Col James (1936–2013) joined the practice after graduating from the University of NSW, and was later awarded a scholarship from the firm to study at Harvard University.

Stephenson and Turner, like many other firms, was hit hard by the global economic downturn during the mid-1980s, and merged with John Castles to become Castles, Stephenson and Turner in 1995.

=== 21st century ===
Since 2000, all Australian operations have closed down.

Stephenson & Turner operates out of four offices in New Zealand, in Auckland, Waikato, Wellington and Christchurch, specialising in social infrastructure buildings and carrying on its heritage in healthcare architecture.

== Major projects ==
- Collins Court Office Building, Little Collins Street, Melbourne, Victoria, 1920–1922
- Melbourne Town Hall (renovations and new main hall), Swanston Street, Melbourne, Victoria, 1925–1927
- Members Pavilion, Melbourne Cricket Ground, East Melbourne, Victoria, 1927 (demolished)
- Shire of Eltham War Memorial at Kangaroo Ground War Memorial Park, Kangaroo Ground, Victoria, 1927
- Castlemaine Art Museum, Lyttleton Street, Castlemaine, Victoria, 1931
- Royal Children's Hospital Crippled Children's Home, Somers, Victoria, 1931 (demolished)
- Lord Somers Camp, Somers, Victoria, 1931
- Healy Wing, St Vincent's Hospital, Fitzroy, Victoria, 1930–1934
- Newspaper House, Collins Street, Melbourne, 1932
- Mercy Hospital, East Melbourne, Victoria, 1934
- Bethesda Hospital, Richmond, Victoria, 1936 (demolished)
- United Dental Hospital, Surry Hills, New South Wales, 1936–1940
- Freemasons Hospital, East Melbourne, Victoria, 1936
- Royal Melbourne Hospital, Parkville, Victoria, 1936–1942 (altered)
- Gloucester House, Royal Prince Alfred Hospital, Camperdown, New South Wales, 1936
- Australian Pavilion, Paris Exposition, Paris, France, 1937 (demolished)
- Victorian Railways, Spirit of Progress train, 1937
- English Scottish and Australian Bank (now ANZ), Royal Branch, Collins Street, Melbourne, Victoria, 1938–1942
- Australian Pavilion, New York World's Fair, New York, United States, 1939–1940 (demolished)
- Victorian Government Tourist Bureau, Melbourne, Victoria, 1939 (interior, demolished)
- King George V Hospital for Mothers and Babies, Sydney, New South Wales, 1939–1941
- Concord Repatriation Hospital (a.k.a. Yaralla Military Hospital), Concord, New South Wales, 1940–1942
- King George V Jubilee Maternal and Infant Welfare Pathological Building, Royal Women's Hospital, Melbourne, 1941 (demolished)
- Torpedo Factory, Workshops and Administration Buildings, Neutral Bay, Sydney, 1942—1943
- Holden Complex, (Dandenong, Fishermans Bend and Lang Lang) Victoria, (Pagewood) New South Wales, (Strathpine) Queensland, and (Trentham) New Zealand, 1952–1964.
- Australian Atomic Energy Commission Research Establishment, Lucas Heights, New South Wales, 1954–1962
- Royal Children's Hospital, Parkville, Melbourne, 1958–1963 (demolished)
- Fibremakers Factory, Bayswater, Victoria, 1958–1968
- Southern Base Teaching Hospital, Basrah, Iraq, 1958–1982
- Auckland Hospital building, New Zealand, 1960–1975
- Royal North Shore Hospital, Sydney, New South Wales, 1961–1971
- Colonial Mutual Life Assurance Society Building, Melbourne, Victoria, 1963
- Main Ward Block, Alfred Hospital, Prahran, Victoria, 1960s
- University of Auckland Medical School, New Zealand, 1967-1974
- United Christian Hospital Extension (Staff Quarter), N.K.I.L. 6014, Hong Kong, 1986
- Starship Children's Hospital, Auckland, 1991

== Awards ==
- 1941 Sulman Medal, King George V Memorial Hospital for Mothers and Babies, Sydney, New South Wales
- 1941 RVIA Street Architectural Medal, King George V Jubilee Maternal and Infant Welfare Pathological Building, Royal Women's Hospital, Melbourne, Victoria
- 1946 Sulman Medal, Yaralla Military Hospital, Concord, New South Wales
- 1992 NZIA Resene Branch Award for Architecture

== Sources ==
- Fisher, J. D. (1990). "Stephenson, Sir Arthur George (1890–1967)". Australian Dictionary of Biography. Vol. 12. National Centre of Biography, Australian National University. ISBN 978-0-522-84459-7. ISSN 1833-7538. OCLC 70677943.
- Australian Institute of Architects, Nationally significant 20th century architecture: Mercy Hospital (former), http://www.architecture.com.au/docs/default-source/vic-notable-buildings/mercy-hospital-(former).pdf
- East Melbourne Historical Society, East Melbourne Walk, emhs.org.au/catalogue/emvf0131
- Julie Willis, Machines for healing, Architecture Australia, July/August 2002.
- Philip Goad and others, Australian Modern: the architecture of Stephenson and Turner, the Miegunyah Press and the State Library of Victoria, 2004.
- John Shaw, Sir Arthur Stephenson: Australian Architect, The Stephenson & Turner Sydney/Hong Kong Group, 1987, 86.
