= North Warrandyte =

North Warrandyte Melbourne, Victoria
- Coordinates: 37.726°S 145.216°E
- Population: 3,027 (2021 census)
  - Density: 561/km^{2} (1,452/sq mi)
- Postcode(s): 3113
- Area: 5.4 km^{2} (2.1 sq mi)
- Location: 25 km (16 mi) from Melbourne
- LGA(s): Shire of Nillumbik
- State electorate(s): Warrandyte
- Federal division(s): Jagajaga
Suburbs around North Warrandyte:
Research	Kangaroo Ground	Kangaroo Ground
Eltham	North Warrandyte	Wonga Park
Warrandyte	Warrandyte	Wonga Park

North Warrandyte is a suburb of Melbourne, Victoria, Australia, 25 km north-east of Melbourne's Central Business District, located within the Shire of Nillumbik local government area. North Warrandyte recorded a population of 3,027 at the 2021 census.

Located in the bushy hills north of the Yarra River, North Warrandyte is separated from its southern neighbour Warrandyte by the river, as well as Municipal Boundaries, CFA Brigade (Country Fire Authority) Boundaries and Suburb Boundaries, yet the two exist as interlocked communities as though those boundaries didn't exist. Winding roads amongst the tree tops and unmade local streets are abundant in the small suburb.

== Geography ==
North Warrandyte is set on the northern banks of the Yarra River, amongst hilly terrain, densely populated with a wide variety of Eucalyptus Trees.

A list of Creeks and Rivers and their features in North Warrandyte:

- Stony Creek
- Pigeon Bank Gully
- Yarra River (including Blue Tongue Bend, The Island, Pound Bend and Bob's Wetlands)

== Community ==
There is a limited number of community facilities in North Warrandyte and the suburb is mostly serviced by neighbouring Warrandyte. However, North Warrandyte is the home of the North Warrandyte Fire Station (CFA), Stony Creek Cottage, Yarra Warra Pre School, North Warrandyte Family Centre, a community hall and Junior's Farm child care centre. A mobile library operated by Yarra Plenty Regional Library regularly visits the suburb.

== Transportation ==
Bus routes include:

- 578 Eltham – Warrandyte (every day). Operated by Panorama Coaches.
- 579 Eltham – Warrandyte (every day). Operated by Panorama Coaches.

Transportation in North Warrandyte is largely limited to the private car as there are no train and trams anywhere near the region. Most local roads are unmade and very narrow, however, all through roads (Primary & Secondary State Arterial Roads) are of a high quality and fully made, although the nature of the suburb's geography forces these roads to wind their way through the hills unrelentingly.

The suburb is serviced by two major roads; Research-Warrandyte Road and Kangaroo Ground-Warrandyte Road. Both roads handle all through traffic and converge in the southern area of the suburb as they find themselves at the Yarra River and then cross it via the 50-year-old Warrandyte Bridge and enter into Warrandyte. Most through traffic is either coming from or going to the suburbs of Warrandyte, Kangaroo Ground, Research and Eltham.

Some major local roads include:

- Floods Road
- Blooms Road
- The Boulevard
- Pigeon Bank Road
- Osborne Road

== Recreation ==
As North Warrandyte is located on the Yarra River a lot of the recreation in the area focuses on water activities. Swimming at the end of Bradleys Lane or canoeing down the river are very popular summer pastimes while bushwalking and picnics tend to be more suitable for cooler months. The majority of recreation undertaken by North Warrandyte's residents are performed in neighbouring Warrandyte as it is home to several facilities such as tennis courts. However, North Warrandyte's parks and reserves are perfect for bushwalking and mountain bike riding. The Warrandyte State Park preserves the natural environment of the Yarra River and its surrounds.

Parks, gardens and reserves in North Warrandyte include:

- Chase Reserve
- Koornong
- Professors Hill Reserve
- Warrandyte State Park (located along the banks of the Yarra River and Stony Creek)
- Normans Reserve
- Bob's Wetlands
- The Island

== See also ==
- Shire of Eltham – North Warrandyte was previously within this former local government area.
- List of Melbourne suburbs
