= Heidelberg Artists Trail =

Art interpretation trail

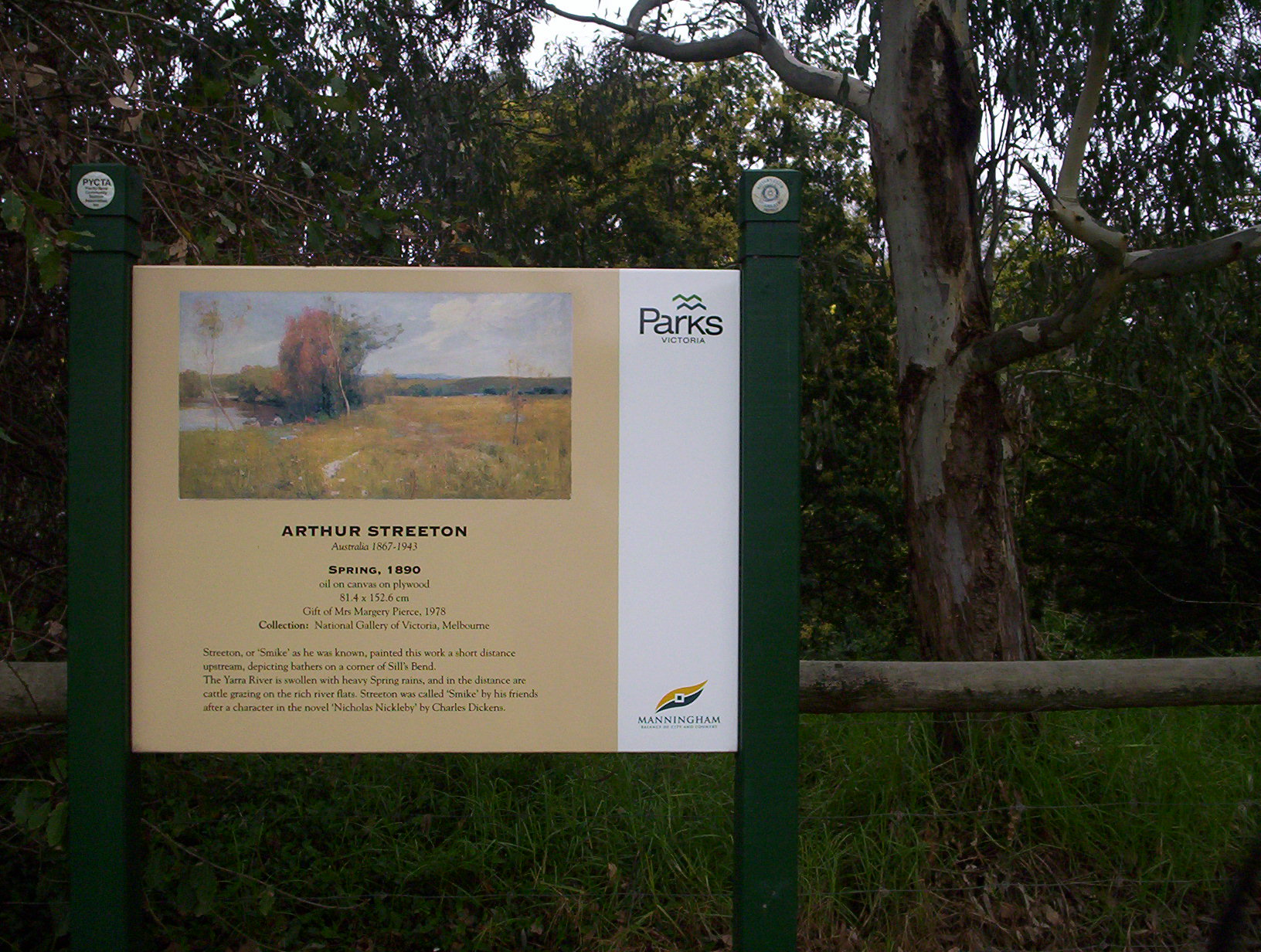
Sign on the artists' walking trail on the Yarra River marking works of the Heidelberg School.

The Heidelberg Artists Trail is a self-drive, cycling and walking trail that includes a series of 57 explanatory signs and boards situated in locations frequented by artists of the Heidelberg School. The signs display reproductions and descriptions of some of the most famous paintings, and are popular with school groups who have an interest in the arts and the natural environment. The trail winds for approximately 40 km through much of Jagajaga, including the municipalities of Banyule, Nillumbik and Manningham, through to the Yarra Valley and the Dandenong Ranges.

== Locations ==
Below is a numbered list of all the signs on the trail and works featured on them (trail length shown in brackets):

- Central Heidelberg (1.5 km)

1. Charles Conder, Impressionists’ Camp, 1889
2. Walter Withers, The Last Summer, 1898
3. Walter Withers, A Bright Winter's Morning, 1894
4. Walter Withers, The Farm, 1890
5. Walter Withers, Early Morning Heidelberg, 1898
6. Walter Withers, The Storm, 1896

- Eaglemont (600m)

7. Arthur Streeton, The Selector's Hut: Whelan on the Log, 1890
8. Arthur Streeton, Eaglemont, 1889
9. Walter Withers, The Yarra Below Eaglemont, 1895

- East Ivanhoe (100m)

10. Emanuel Phillips Fox, A Love Story, 1903
11. Emanuel Phillips Fox, Art Students, 1895
12. Tudor St George Tucker, Young Girl in a Garden, 1895

- Yarra Flats Park (3.8 km)

13. Emanuel Phillips Fox, Moonrise Heidelberg, 1900
14. Walter Withers, Chartersville near Eaglemont, Victoria, 1890
15. Arthur Streeton, Sill Glides the Stream & Shall Forever Glide, 1890
16. Arthur Streeton, Above Us the Great Grave Sky, 1890
17. Arthur Streeton, Golden Summer, Eaglemont, 1889
18. Arthur Streeton, Near Heidelberg, 1890
19. Louis Buvelot, Winter Morning near Heidelberg, 1866
20. Walter Withers, Tranquil Winter, 1895

- Banksia Park (200m)

21. Arthur Streeton, Spring, 1890
22. Tom Roberts, Quiet Stream, Heidelberg, 1885
23. Charles Conder, The Yarra Heidelberg Boys Bathing, 1890

- Templestowe (1.7 km)

24. David Davies, Evening at Templestowe, 1897
25. Louis Buvelot, Summer Afternoon, Templstowe, 1866
26. Arthur Streeton, The Road to Templestowe, 1889
27. David Davies, Moonrise, 1894

- Warrandyte (800m)

28. Clara Southern, A Cool Corner, 1918
29. Clara Southern, Warrandyte Hotel, 1910
30. Clara Southern, Evensong, 1900
31. Walter Withers, Old Bridge, Warrnadyte

- Eltham (1.5 km)

32. Walter Withers, Country Road, 1898
33. Walter Withers, Spring, 1910
34. Walter Withers, On the Eltham Road, 1906
35. Walter Withers, The Drover, 1912
36. Walter Withers, Landscape with Sheep
37. Walter Withers, The Silent Gums, 1909

- Research (500m)

38. Clara Southern, An Old Bee Farm, 1900
39. Clara Southern, A Country Wash-House, 1905
40. Clara Southern, Audrey and Chickapick, 1911
41. Clara Southern, The Artist’s Home, 1909

- Diamond Creek (500m)

42. May Vale, The Orchard, 1904
43. Jane Price, Moonrise

- Ferntree Gully

44. Eugene Von Guerard, Ferntree Gully in the Dandenong Ranges, 1857

- Kallista (200m)

45. Tom Roberts, Washing Day, Kallista, 1923
46. Tom Roberts, Country Road Makers, 1923
47. Tom Roberts, Sherbrooke Forest, 1924

- Olinda (100m)

48. Arthur Streeton, Golden Afternoon, Olinda, 1924
49. Arthur Streeton, View from Farmer’s, Olinda, 1924

- Mount Dandenong & Kalorama

50. Arthur Streeton, The Cloud (Storm over Macedon), 1936
51. Arthur Streeton, Observatory Road Kalorama Park looking towards Silvan, 1937

- Silvan

52. Arthur Streeton, Silvan Dam, 1930

- Lilydale

53. Arthur Streeton, Mitchell’s Lime Quarry, 1935

- Coldstream (100m)

54. Arthur Streeton, Melba’s Farm, 1914
55. William Nicholas Rowell, Lilydale Road, 1928

- Yering

56. Arthur Streeton, Chrysanthemums, 1891

- Yarra Glen

57. Theodore Penleigh Boyd, The Boyd Homestead at Yarra Glen, 1910
