= Kangaroo Ground War Memorial Park =

War memorial in Australia

Coordinates: 37.6885°S 145.2244°E

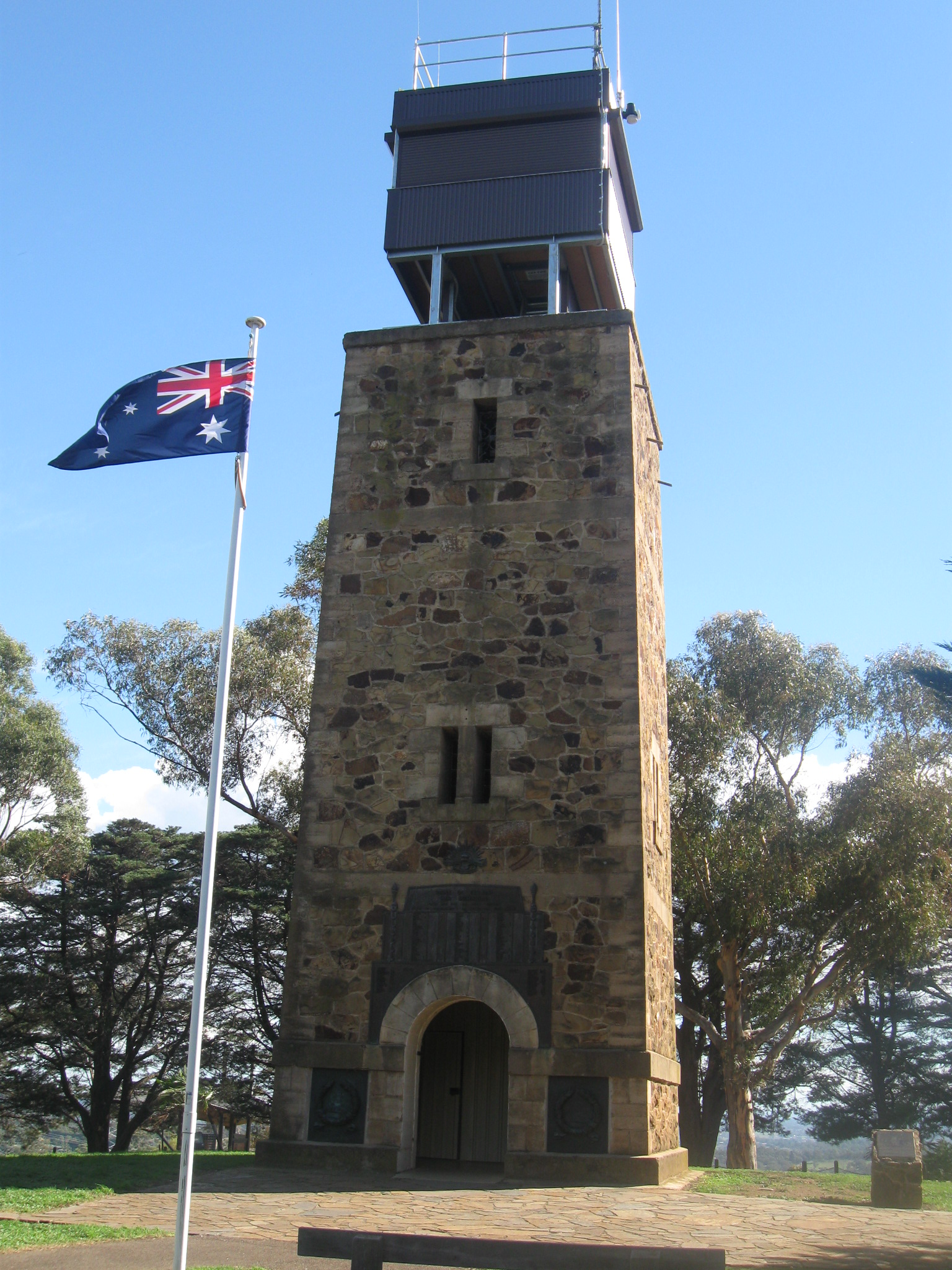
Kangaroo Ground Tower of Remembrance

Kangaroo Ground War Memorial Park is located at 385 Eltham Yarra Glen Road, Kangaroo Ground in the Shire of Nillumbik. in Victoria, Australia. The site includes the war memorial, with a firespotting cabin, mature monterey cypress trees and other planted species, and a sandstone caretaker's cottage. The park is situated on the summit of Garden Hill, from which panoramic views are obtainable. The park is situated on two acres.

Towards the end of World War One, in August 1918, Eltham Shire Council discussed and 'generally expressed themselves as favourable to the proposal' to obtain a "piece of land on the summit of Garden Hill, Kangaroo Ground, and the formation of a memorial park in which a monument could be erected to represent the whole of the Shire. Local resident Walter Wippell donated £50 and with it Council purchased the one-acre site. In 1919 Joseph Mess agreed to take £50 per acre for two acres of his Garden Hill property. By 1920 subscriptions lists were opened for the purposes of raising funds to "carry out the proposed scheme of beautification, and also to erect, at a later date, a fitting monument to perpetuate the memory of those who fell in the Great War'. Working bees took place on the site and rocks were collected for a memorial cairn which was built in a slight depression which signified the highest point in the park. The compilation of "a complete record of the names of all persons who enlisted for service from the Shire and of those who made the supreme sacrifice whilst doing their duty" began in 1920. The park was officially opened by Mr. W. H. Everard, M.L.A. on 3 September 1921. In 1927 a stone hut, known as the caretaker's cottage was built from left over stone quarried for the tower. On Remembrance Day, 2005 a seedling, a descendant of the Gallipoli lone pine tree was planted. Brick toilets constructed in 1965 were also removed and replaced in 2005 including a universal access space.

In 2006, a plaque was put in place from the Vietnam Veterans community in commemoration of the 40th anniversary of the Battle of Long Tan. Nillumbik Shire Council received funding under the 2008–09 Restoring Community War Memorials Grants program to restore plaques on the Tower, and replace bollards to enhance security around the memorial. In December 2014, Nillumbik Shire Council received Anzac Centenary Local Grants Program funding to create new interpretative signage.

In 2015 Shire of Nillumbik added the Tower of Remembrance and War Memorial Park and Moor-ul Viewing Platform to its draft register of memorials. In 2020 Shire of Nillumbik commenced preparing a master plan to create a long-term vision and plan for the park.

== Geology ==
Garden Hill and the surrounding 2000 acres consisting of black soil are probably the remains of an extensive sheet of lava that once flowed down a shallow river valley. Possibly there were two flows. Early settlers considered the area an extinct volcano.

== Shire of Eltham War Memorial ==
The Shire memorial was built based on a sketch by artist Harold Herbert who was inspired by the view, which reminded him of northern England and a conversation with friend Basil Hay mentioning stone keeps built to detect cattle duffing raids centuries ago on the border counties of Scotland and England. It was designed by architects Stephenson and Meldrum. (Later known as Stephenson and Turner). It is built from local stone donated by the local community including Professor William Osborne, and reinforced concrete with sandstone rubble facing and concrete quoins and dressings. The foundations are solid rock with the base of the tower in 16 x 16 external and 11 x 11 internal, the wall being 2 feet 6 inches thick at the base, tapering to 16 inches at the top. The building contractor was George Rousell. The original internal staircase was made from jarrah, with galvanised iron pipe handrailings leading to a look-out. There are 53 stairs. The memorial is 40 feet high or 237 metres.

The view extends to the Kinglake National Park escarpment, the mountains beyond Healesville, the Dandenongs, Port Phillip Bay, the You Yangs and Mt. Macedon.

It was opened on Armistice Day, 11 November 1926, by the governor-general, Lord John Baird Stonehaven, when he also unveiled a temporary honour board. In 1930 a tablet bearing the names of men who served and fell in the First World War was erected on the memorial. On 16 November 1951, the governor of Victoria, Sir Dallas Brooks re-dedicated the memorial with an additional plaque to honour those who had died between 1939 and 1945 and the caretaker's cottage as memorials to the dead of the two world wars. In November 2001, on the memorial's 75th anniversary, Victorian Governor John Landy unveiled plaques to honour servicemen and women who served in post World War 2 conflicts in Korea, Malaya, Borneo and Vietnam.

The memorial is considered architecturally, socially, aesthetically and historically significant to the Shire of Nillumbik and is considered one of Victoria's most unusual war memorials.

=== Fire Spotting ===
Following the Black Friday Bushfires in 1939, which impacted the area, a telephone was installed for the use of volunteers using the tower as an observation post for fires. Forests Commission Victoria included the tower as part of its fire-watching network and it was the command post when significant bushfires took place locally in 1962. An enclosed cabin cover was erected on the top of the tower in 1974. The advice of Mr Meldrum, the architect of the memorial was sought and he agreed that the proposed shelter could be added without aesthetic damage. On Black Saturday, 7 February 2009, fire spotters observed new fires starting and with the help of maps, binoculars and other towers in the region, they were able to determine the location of fires starting up, which were then reported to the Kilmore incident control centre. This cabin was replaced with a new tower in December 2009. Improvements included a new larger and airconditioned cabin two metres higher than the original cabin. It is fitted with new communication and mapping equipment and is built on a tilt to eliminate reflection. It is a staffed incident control centre in the summer, part of the Country Fire Authority's District 13 operations.

== Viewing Platform and Grasslands ==
The Moor-rul viewing platform was opened on 17 April 2008 in the presence of Jenny Macklin, MP. The function of the platform is to provide shelter adjacent to the war memorial whilst allowing people to enjoy the view. It can be accessed by wheelchair. The name Moor-rul is indigenous describing the fertile soils of the Kangaroo Ground area. Eight double-sided interpretative panels on the platform describe the Aboriginal and European history, geology and flora and fauna of the area. A small section of land next to the platform is maintained with plants indigenous to the area.
