= Watsons Creek, Victoria =

Coordinates: 37°40′12″S 145°15′29″E

Watsons Creek
- Town
- Country: Australia
- State: Victoria
- LGA: Shire of Nillumbik
- Location: 31 km (19 mi) from Melbourne

Government
  - State electorate: Eildon
  - Federal divisions: Casey; Jagajaga

Population
  - Total: 58 (2021 census)
- Postcode: 3097
Localities around Watsons Creek
Panton Hill	Panton Hill	Christmas Hills
Panton Hill	Watsons Creek	Christmas Hills
Kangaroo Ground	Kangaroo Ground	Kangaroo Ground

Watsons Creek is a locality in Victoria, Australia, 31 km north-east of Melbourne's Central Business District, located within the Shire of Nillumbik local government area. Watsons Creek recorded a population of 58 at the 2021 census.

Watsons Creek lies to the north and west of Eltham-Yarra Glen Road.

== History ==
Watsons Creek was named after Sandy Watson, who farmed fat cattle and sold butter and meat to the miners on the One Tree Hill, Happy Valley and Queenstown diggings.

A Watsons Creek Post Office was open in 1903 and 1904. Watson's Post Office opened on 11 September 1911, was renamed Chiselhurst later that year and closed in 1923.

== See also ==
- Shire of Eltham – Watsons Creek was previously within this former local government area.
