= Constance Amy Fall =

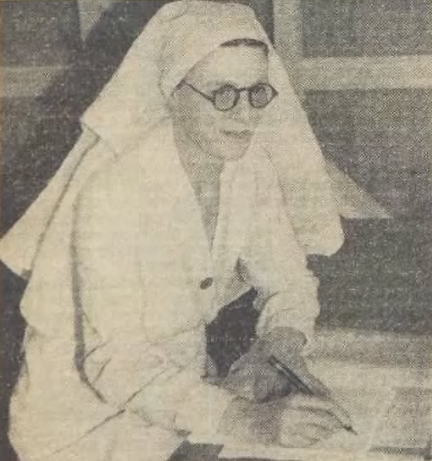
Constance Amy Fall in 1939

Constance Amy Fall, OBE (13 October 1903 – 15 September 1992) was a British-born Australian nurse known for her work during the Second World War. After becoming the first nurse appointed to the Australian Army Nursing Service on the outbreak of the war, Fall travelled to the Middle East with the Second Australian Imperial Force and served as matron of the first Australian hospital in Gaza. She received a mention in dispatches and was awarded the Royal Red Cross for her efforts

Following the war, Fall divided her working time between the army and the King George V Memorial Hospital, and travelled abroad to study administrative practices for obstetric training schools. She retired from the army in 1959 but continued to work as a nurse in other capacities. She received the Florence Nightingale Medal in 1971 for distinguished nursing services and for her work with the Red Cross, and in 1976 she was made an Officer of the Order of the British Empire.

== Early life ==
Constance Amy Fall was born on 13 October 1903 in Birmingham, England. Both her parents were Australian. Her mother was a nurse during the First World War, and Fall became interested in nursing after seeing her at work. She moved to Australia around 1920 and later completed her training in nursing at a hospital in Launceston, Tasmania, where she graduated in 1924. As of 1939, she was working at the Quirindi Hospital in New South Wales.

== Career ==
When the Second World War began, Fall was the first nurse appointed to the Australian Army Nursing Service. She travelled to the Middle East with members of the Second Australian Imperial Force (A. I. F.) and served as matron of the first Australian hospital in Gaza, expanding the number of available beds from 600 to 21,000 in only six months. She received a mention in dispatches in 1941, and was awarded the Royal Red Cross in 1942. When the Second A. I. F. returned to Australia in 1943, Fall was appointed to postings overseeing Western Australia and Tasmania, and was promoted to the rank of lieutenant-colonel. In early 1945, Fall was made the principal matron of the Australian Army Nursing Service.

After the war, Fall became matron at the King George V Memorial Hospital in New South Wales and spent the rest of her career dividing her working time between the hospital and the army. In 1948, she received a nursing scholarship from the British Council (the first to be awarded to an Australian), which she used to research administrative practices for obstetric training schools. She completed her studies through the Royal College of Midwives in London, England. In 1955, she continued her education by attending a month-long nursing seminar in Suva organised by the World Health Organization. During the 1950s, Fall was assistant director of the Royal Australian Army Nursing Corps and a deputy chairman of the Junior Red Cross, as well as Fellow at the New South Wales College of Nursing. She served as president of the Returned Sisters branch of the Returned and Services League, and in February 1958 she commanded a Women's Services parade of 1,300 women for the Queen Mother's visit to Australia.

Fall retired from the army in 1959 and left her job at the King George V Hospital the following year, subsequently taking on a new matron position at the New South Wales Masonic Homes in 1961. She later became the first Royal Australian Army Nursing Corps member to be made an honorary colonel. In 1971, she was awarded the international Florence Nightingale Medal, granted for her distinguished nursing services in peacetime and wartime and for "outstanding work with the Australian Red Cross". In 1976, she was made an Officer of the Order of the British Empire.

Fall died on 15 September 1992 in New South Wales, Australia.
