= Irene Frances Taylor =

Australian journalist and activist

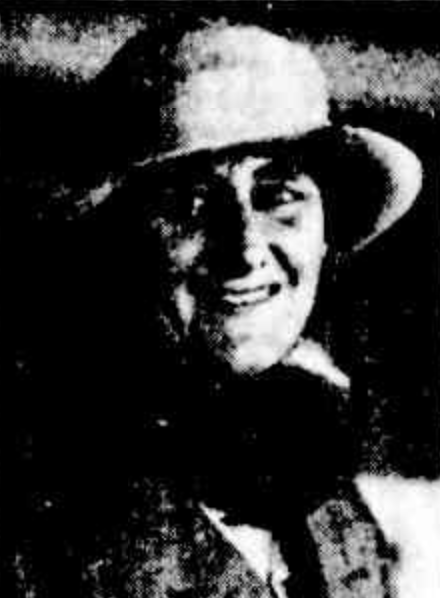
- Irene Frances Taylor in 1926
- Born: 17 December 1890; St Kilda, Melbourne, Australia
- Died: 26 December 1933 (aged 43); Melbourne
- Occupations: Journalist and activist
- Notable work: Monthly magazine Woman's World

Irene Frances Taylor (17 December 1890 – 26 December 1933) was an Australian journalist and activist. She was the founder of the women's monthly magazine Woman's World which covered a plethora of issues providing updates on women's issues in the world, related to care of children, housekeeping, styles of fashion, physical games, musical forms, welfare activities and interviews with well known women. This magazine flourished even after her death, till 1957. She was represented on the Lyceum Club of Melbourne as a member.

== Biography ==
Taylor was born in the Melbourne suburb of St Kilda on 17 December 1890. Her parents were Rev. Edward Taylor who was a Congregational minister, and Alice, née Mumford. In the initial years she was brought up in New Zealand where her parents had moved. However, she returned to Melbourne to pursue her higher education at the Presbyterian Ladies' College. She was adventurous in her youth; in 1916 she rode horseback on a twelve-day journey from Mildura to Melbourne and recorded a diary of her findings. Even later in life she pursued her interest in Australian bush life by owning a resort in Kangaroo Ground, Victoria and visited the cottage dressed in her riding suit.

Taylor started her career in journalism with an apprenticeship as secretary to the editor of the Sunraysia at Mildura. She persisted with her desire to work as a professional writer by editing the journal of the Grocers' Association of Victoria. In the 1920s she edited the Gum Tree, a journal published by the Forest League of Australia. In 1921, she established the Australian Woman's World: A town and Country Journal for Australian Women, a monthly magazine. To make this magazine self-sustaining she sought advertisements by approaching clients personally, and the first issue of the magazine was published on 1 December 1921; it was a journal of 40 pages with illustrations and articles related to modern issues concerning women. To improve the content of the magazine she interacted with several feminist organizations in Melbourne; created subscribers for her magazine; and promoted consumer culture to fund her feminist activities. She continued to publish the journal, improving the content of articles and the presentation format; for this purpose she traveled to Papua. As a result of her concerted efforts to improvement, the journal had 12,000 subscribers as of 1926. Midge (as she was known in journalistic circles) guided and instructed middle-class women on aspects of consumer culture in the post-First World War period when markets were flush with many new products and making a choice was difficult.

In 1926, she took a six-month sabbatical from her routine in Australia; and visited London and Paris where she attended, as a woman delegate, conferences such as the World Empire Conference of Women in London, the Victorian Women's Society for Equal Citizenship, and the conference at the Sorbonne in Paris of the International Suffrage Alliance. While in London she also interacted and forged alliances with the editors of Time and Tide magazine who were appreciative of her efforts in publishing a magazine in Australia fully on her own.

During her career she was also involved in giving "morning tea talks" on the Australian radio station 3UZ on subjects concerning women. During the Great Depression she involved herself through her magazine on advising women on how to economize.

Taylor died of cancer on 26 December 1933 in Melbourne; She was buried in Kangaroo Ground cemetery.

== Bibliography ==
- Dickenson, Jackie (2015). Australian Women in Advertising in the Twentieth Century. Palgrave Macmillan. ISBN 978-1-137-51434-9.
