= Smiths Gully =

Coordinates: 37°37′08″S 145°15′22″E

- Town
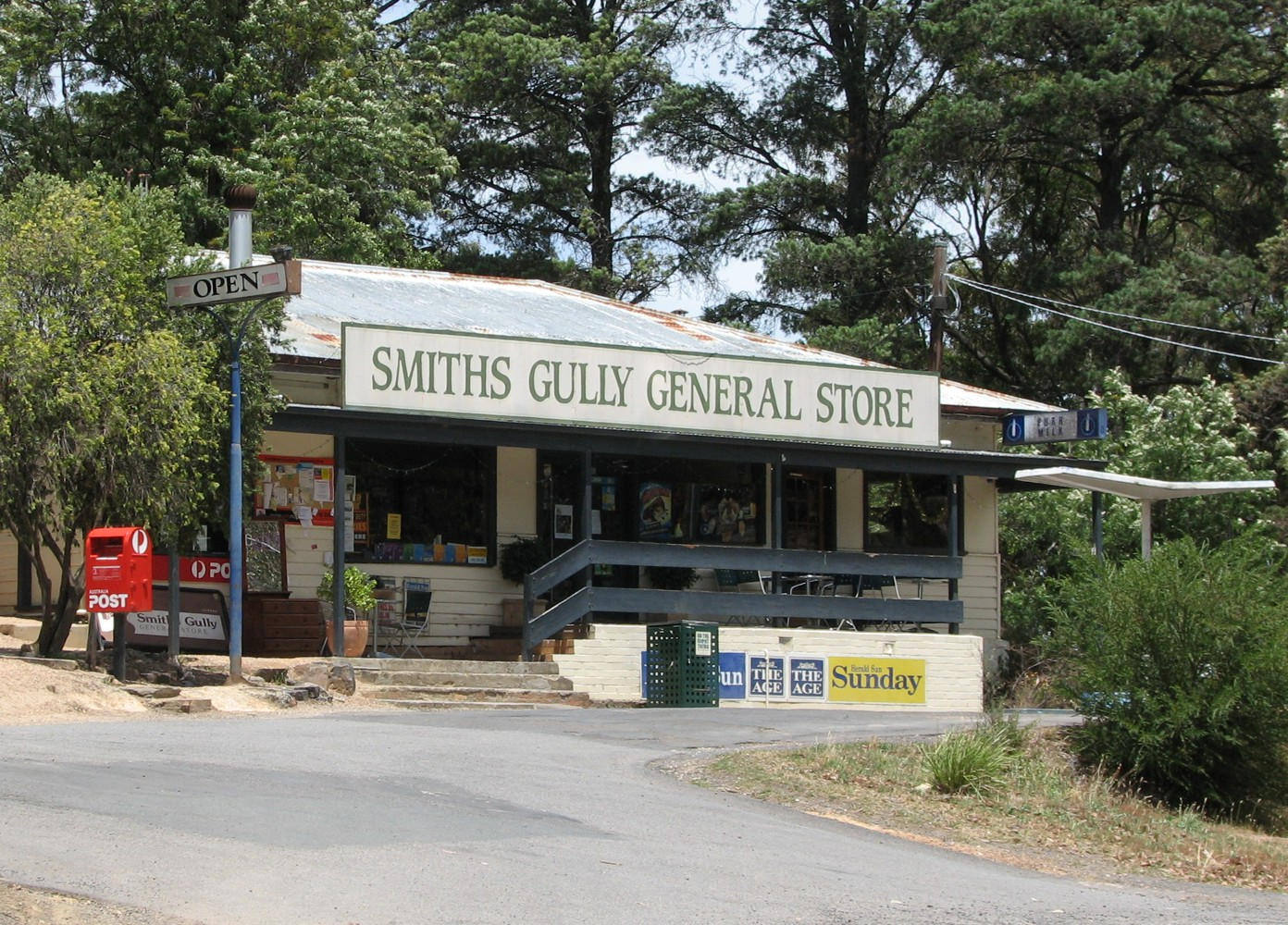
- The general store
- Interactive map of Smiths Gully
- Country: Australia
- State: Victoria
- LGA: Shire of Nillumbik
- Location: 35 km (22 mi) from Melbourne; 11 km (6.8 mi) from Hurstbridge

Government
  - State electorate: Eildon
  - Federal divisions: Casey; McEwen
- Elevation: 191 m (627 ft)

Population
  - Total: 5.5 (2021 census)
- Postcode: 3760
Localities around Smiths Gully
St Andrews	St Andrews	Christmas Hills
Panton Hill	Smiths Gully	Christmas Hills
Panton Hill	Christmas Hills	Christmas Hills

Smiths Gully is a town in Victoria, Australia, 35 km north-east of Melbourne's Central Business District, located within the Shire of Nillumbik local government area. Smiths Gully recorded a population of 356 at the 2021 census.

Smith Gully Road Post Office opened in 1902, was renamed Smith Gully in 1964 and Smiths Gully later that year. The Post Office continues to operate at the general store on the Kangaroo Ground – St Andrews Road.

Primary schools operated in Smiths Gully during 1867-84 and in 1886.

The 1860s Queenstown Cemetery is a rare example of a private burial ground established by district's early settlers and is also a resting place of several prominent local citizens. The Cemetery is 1 km east of the Smiths Gully Store.

== See also ==
- Shire of Eltham – Smiths Gully was previously within this former local government area.
