= King George V Memorial Hospital =

Coordinates: 33°53′23″S 151°10′54″E

- Sydney Local Health District
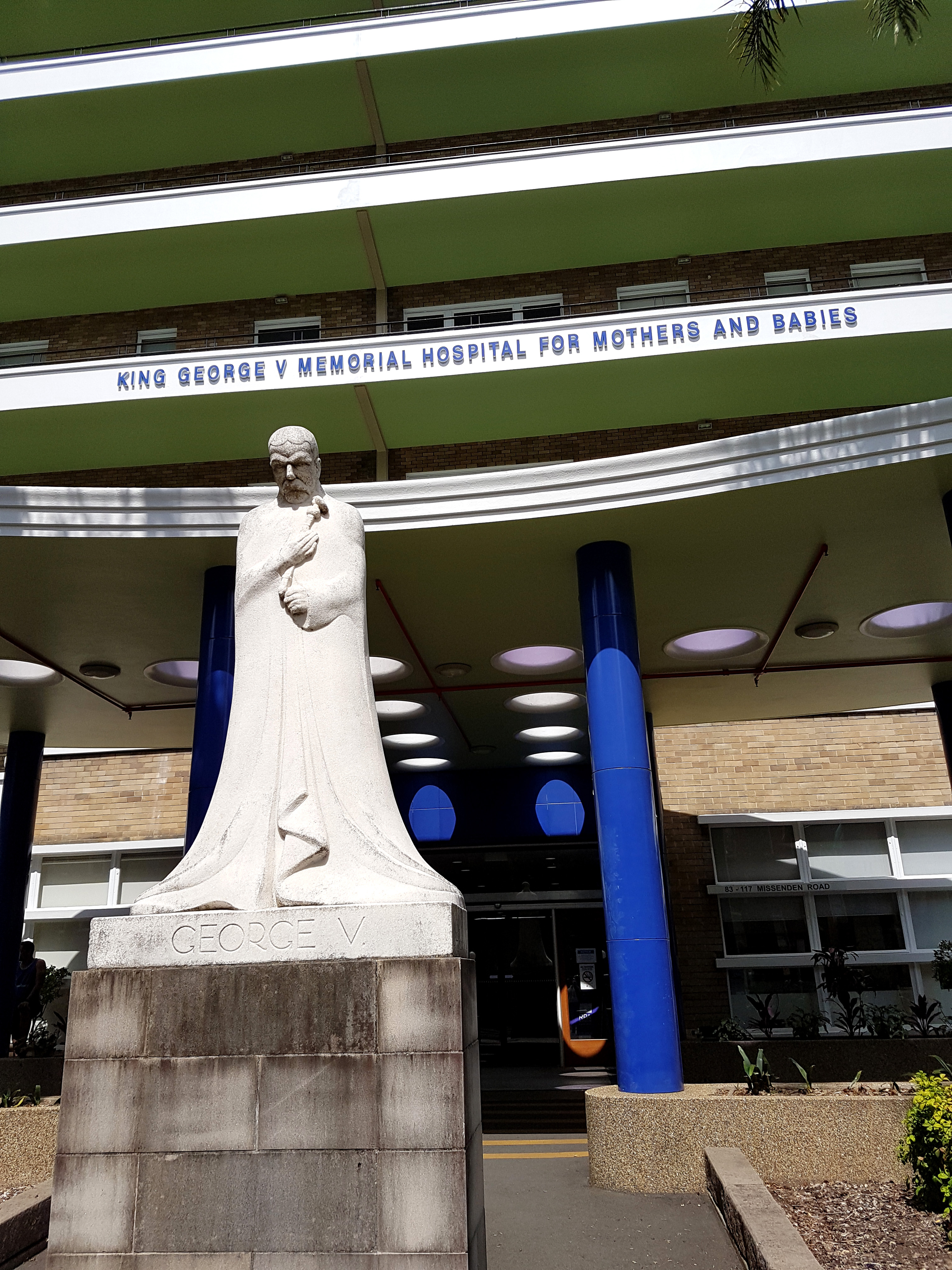

Geography
- Location: Camperdown, Sydney, New South Wales, Australia

Organisation
- Care system: Public Medicare (AU)
- Type: Perinatal teaching
- Affiliated university: University of Sydney

History
- Founded: 1941
- Closed: 2002

Links
- Lists: Hospitals in Australia

The King George V Memorial Hospital for Mothers and Babies is a former hospital, exclusively for mothers and babies, in Sydney, Australia. It is located on Missenden Road in Camperdown, directly opposite the main buildings of the much larger Royal Prince Alfred Hospital with which it was amalgamated on 14 November 2002.

== History ==
King George V hospital, opened in 1941, was designed in the Inter-War International Art Moderne style by prominent Sydney architects Stephenson & Turner. Of an especially innovative design, the building was awarded the 1941 Sir John Sulman Medal by the Royal Australian Institute of Architects (NSW Chapter). The building includes murals made by Danish sculptor Otto Steen and three statues by Hungarian sculptor Andor Mészáros: "Statue to Maternity", unveiled in 1944, "Surgeon" in 1945, and the final statue, of King George V, was unveiled in 1947.

The Hospital was named after King George V and was originally built as part of an expansion of the Royal Prince Alfred Hospital to be a stand-alone teaching hospital for obstetrics and gynaecology. Early staff included Constance Amy Fall, a Royal Red Cross recipient who became matron-in-charge at the King George V Hospital in 1948 after completing overseas nursing service in the Second World War.

After serving in its intended role for 61 years the old King George V Memorial Hospital was, in 2002, amalgamated back into the (much larger) Royal Prince Alfred Hospital from which it had been separated in 1941. Maternity services were transferred into a larger newly built wing on the other side of Missenden Road and the original building was refurbished to house hospital administration offices for Royal Prince Alfred, including Human Resources and Staff related services.
