= Arthur George Stephenson =

Australian architect (1890-1967)

Sir Arthur George Stephenson (1890–1967), was an Australian architect.

Stephensen was born in 1890 at Box Hill, Victoria, Australia.

In 1907 Stephenson worked for Swansson Brothers while studying construction at the Working Men's College. During World War I, he joined the Australian Imperial Force in 1915 as a lieutenant, promoted to captain and awarded the Military Cross. After the war, Stephenson remained in London and studied at the Architectural Association School (AA) and joined the Royal Institute of British Architects (RIBA) in 1920. He returned to Melbourne and established Stephenson & Meldrum in 1921.

Stephenson was largely responsible for Stephenson & Meldrum's direction to specialise in hospital and industrial architecture. He also lectured, wrote widely and was a member of numerous committees, including the International Hospitals Federation, the Hospital Advisory Council (Melbourne) and a trustee of the National Museum of Victoria. In 1954 Stephenson was knighted for services to architecture and was the first Australian to receive a RIBA Royal Gold Medal in 1954. The Royal Australian Institute of Architects (RAIA) awarded him a gold medal in 1963 and he was made honorary fellow by The American Institute of Architects in 1964.
