= Panton Hill =

Coordinates: 37°38′35″S 145°14′20″E

- Town
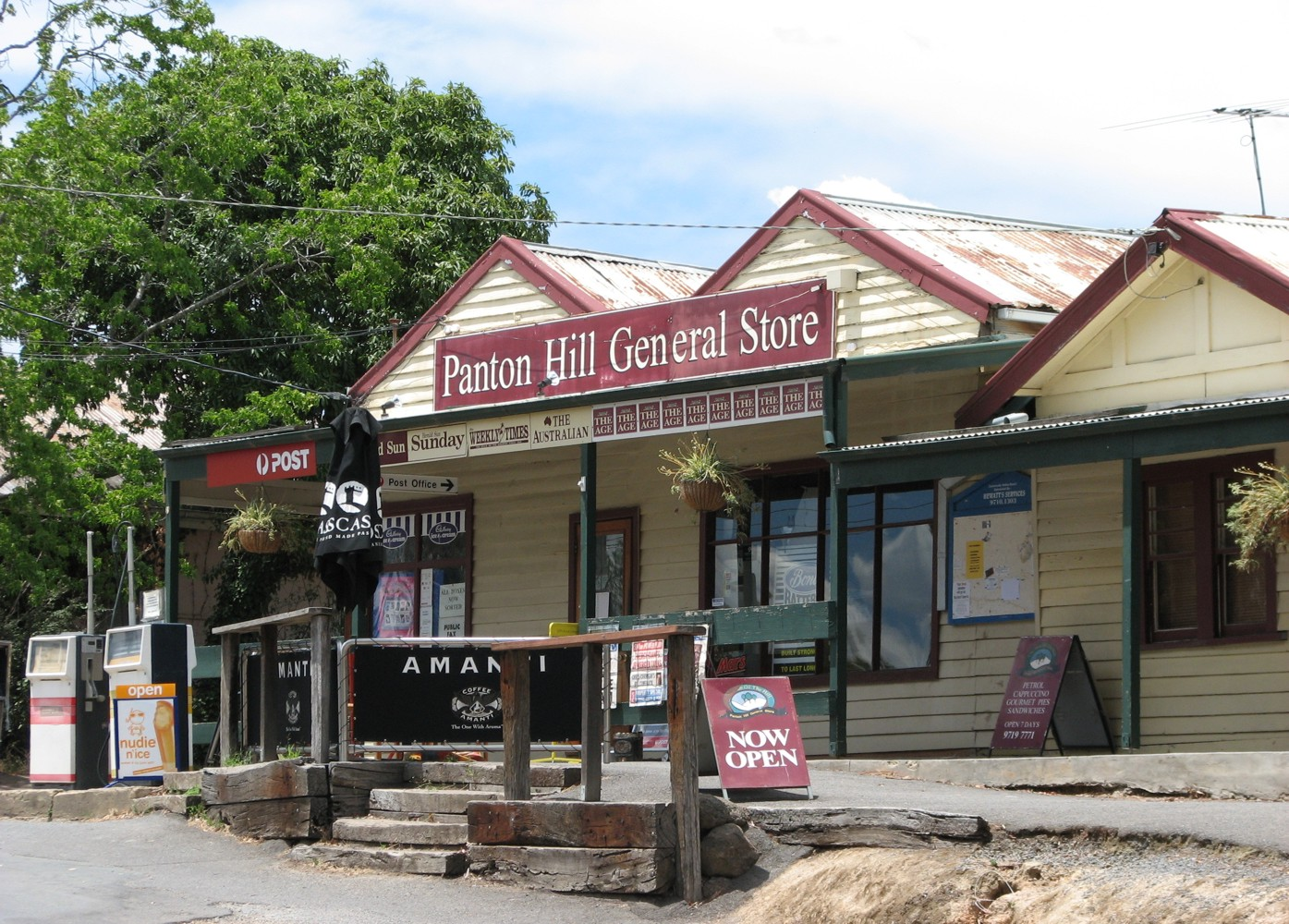
- Panton Hill general store
- Interactive map of Panton Hill
- Country: Australia
- State: Victoria
- LGA: Shire of Nillumbik
- Location: 32 km (20 mi) from Melbourne; 4.2 km (2.6 mi) from Hurstbridge

Government
  - State electorates: Eildon; Yan Yean
  - Federal divisions: McEwen; Casey
- Elevation: 154 m (505 ft)

Population
  - Total: 1,063 (2021 census)
- Postcode: 3759
Localities around Panton Hill
Hurstbridge	Cottles Bridge	Smiths Gully
Wattle Glen	Panton Hill	Christmas Hills
Wattle Glen	Kangaroo Ground	Christmas Hills

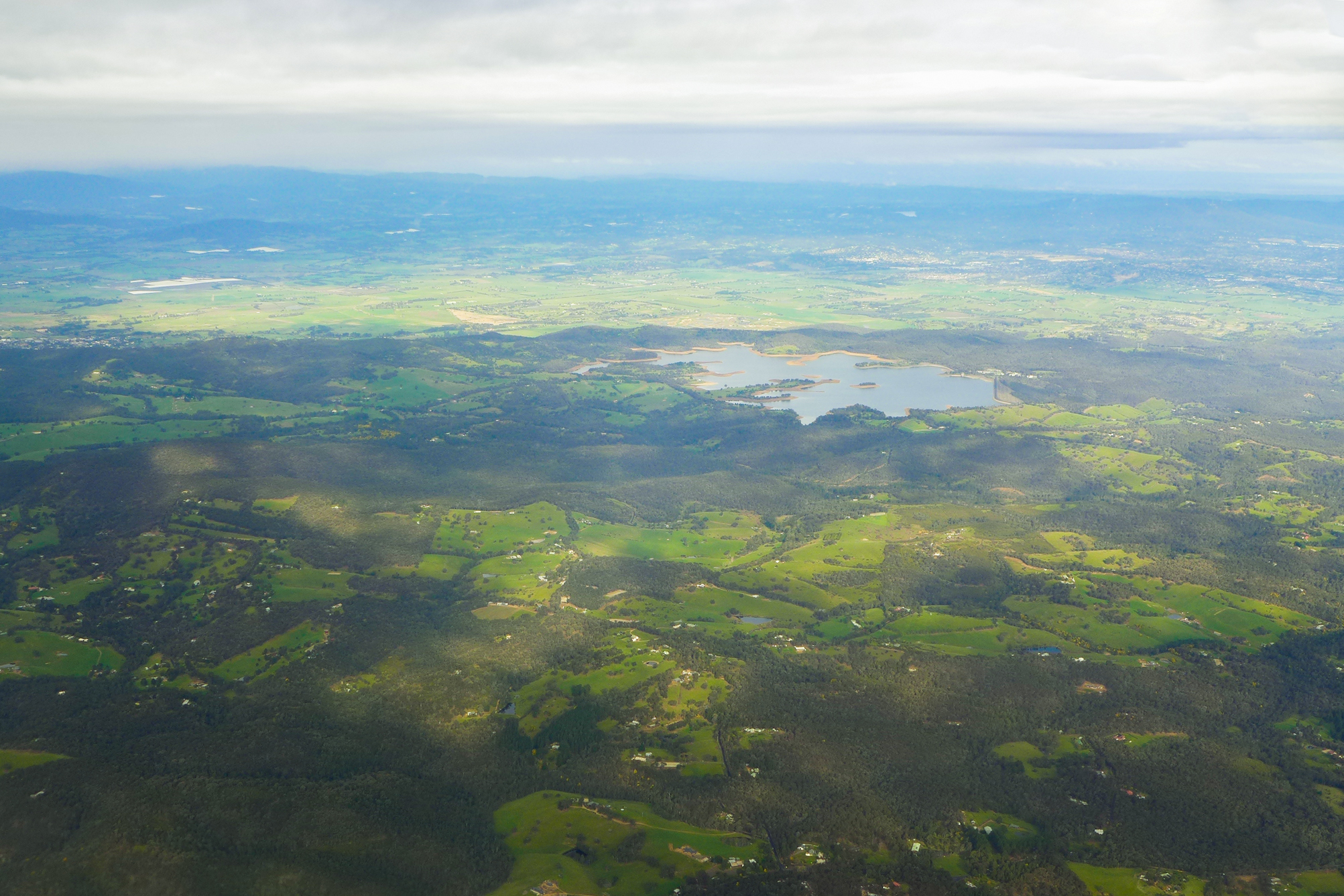
Farmland in Panton Hill

Panton Hill is a town in Victoria, Australia, 32 km north-east of Melbourne's Central Business District, located within the Shire of Nillumbik local government area. Panton Hill recorded a population of 1,063 at the 2021 census.

== History ==
Originally called Kingstown, the area experienced population growth in the mid-1850s during the Victorian gold rush when prospectors mined the hills around the town known as the Caledonia Goldfields.

It was named after Joseph Anderson Panton, who was the magistrate at Heidelberg and spent much of his spare time mapping the Yarra Valley.

Panton Hill Post Office opened on 1 October 1875.

The Panton Hill Primary School, number 1134, was originally a two (2) room building with the Headmasters residence beside it.

== Today ==
The town has a hotel, general store/post office, an Australian rules football club called the Panton Hill Redbacks, competing in the Northern Football League and a cricket club in the Diamond Valley Cricket Association, with 4 senior teams and 4 junior teams. It is also home to a small church, St. Matthew's Anglican Church, and several wineries including Panton Hill Winery.

Panton Hill Primary School has an enrolment of approximately 150. The nearest high schools are Diamond Valley Secondary College and Eltham College. Panton Hill also has a volunteer Country Fire Brigade that services Panton Hill and the surrounding areas. A park in the centre of town has been dedicated to the memory of 5 of Panton Hill's firefighters who perished on Ash Wednesday. Panton Hill Primary School's houses are named after these firefighters.

A mobile library service operated by Yarra Plenty Regional Library regularly visits the township.

== See also ==
- Shire of Eltham – Panton Hill was previously within this former local government area.
