= Camperdown =

Camperdown may refer to:

== Places ==
Australia

- Camperdown, New South Wales, a suburb of Sydney
- Camperdown, Victoria, a town in Western Victoria
  - Camperdown railway station

Canada

- Camperdown, Nova Scotia, an unincorporated community
- Camperdown Signal Station, operated 1797–1925, located on Portuguese Cove, Nova Scotia

England

- Camperdown, Tyne and Wear, a village in the Metropolitan Borough of North Tyneside

Netherlands

- Kamperduin, a village in the province of North Holland, on the North Sea coast

Scotland

- Camperdown, Dundee, a suburb of Dundee

South Africa

- Camperdown, KwaZulu-Natal, a town

== Other uses ==
- Battle of Camperdown, a naval battle fought between the Dutch and British fleets in 1797 off the Dutch coast near Kamperduin
- HMS Camperdown, four ships of the Royal Navy named after the battle
- Camperdown Elm (or "Weeping Elm"), a type of tree
- Camperdown Works, a historic jute works in Dundee

== See also ==
- The Ballad of the "Clampherdown", a satirical poem by Rudyard Kipling about a naval battle
