= International Hospital Federation =

The International Hospital Federation (IHF) is an independent, not-for-profit, non-governmental organization based in Bernex (Canton of Geneva), Switzerland. The IHF is a global membership association for hospital management that assists leaders of healthcare organizations and facilities in improving the standard, quality, and level of service delivery to improve the healthcare outcomes of people all over the world. The IHF provides a platform for the global healthcare community to share knowledge, ideas, and experiences, as well as identify international partnerships and collaboration opportunities. The IHF also represents the voice of hospitals and health systems on the global stage in initiatives, research, and joint statements with other global institutions and NGOs. Furthermore, the IHF established the Geneva Sustainability Centre in 2022 in response to the need for hospitals and healthcare services to address climate change.

== History ==
The International Hospital Federation (IHF) was founded in 1929 after the first World Hospital Congress in Atlantic City, New Jersey. Initially named the International Hospital Association (IHA), the organisation was renamed the International Hospital Federation in 1947.

The first President of the IHF from 1947 onwards was Dr René Sand from Belgium, a pioneer in the field of social medicine and with much experience in international relations. Around this period, a strong relationship with the World Health Organization (WHO) was cultivated and the Federation's development policy continued to expand.

The IHF Secretariat first settled in London, (UK), where it remained for over 50 years. After moving to Ferney-Voltaire, France in 2002, the IHF relocated in 2011, to its current location in Bernex, within the Canton of Geneva, Switzerland. The IHF Secretariat is thus based where those who address today's most pressing challenges amongst IOs, NGOs, permanent missions, and others are located. The relocation of the headquarter was a strategic decision with two objectives: the first being to strengthen the collaboration with global actors that share similar objectives, and second, to be at the heart of the healthcare discussion and make the voice of hospitals heard.

== Governance & Organization ==
=== Governance ===
The governing body of the IHF is divided into three branches: the General Assembly, the Governing Council and the Executive Committee

The General Assembly is the formal decision-making body of the IHF which meets once every year, and if possible, during the World Hospital Congress. The main purpose of the General Assembly is to elect or dismiss the members of the Governing Council, elect the President on the recommendation of the members of the Governing Board but also to elect, suspend or dismiss the honorary members of the IHF.

The Governing Council that meets around three times a year. The Governing Council is responsible for electing an executive committee composed of four persons, namely the President, the President-Designate, the Immediate Past President and the Treasurer. The Federation changes President every two years.

The executive committee that oversees the daily activities of the IHF and supports its chief executive officer, as directed by the Governing Council.

=== The Secretariat ===
The Secretariat is led by a chief executive officer, who leads the activities of the Federation. The Secretariat manages IHF programmes of work for knowledge exchange and leadership development, collaborative initiatives with global institutions partner organizations, as well as organizing the annual World Hospital Congress. It is also responsible for member relations and development. Also at the IHF headquarters, the IHF's Geneva Sustainability Centre team provide the information, tools, and skills to drive resilient, low-carbon, equitable, and sustainable healthcare delivery at leadership, management, and institutional levels.

=== Members ===
The IHF's Membership primarily comprises national hospital associations. Under the umbrella of the IHF, these members come together to encourage the development of responsible healthcare practices and to strengthen the spirit of cooperation among global health actors. There are three categories of members: Full Members, Premier Members and Associate Members (Group or Standalone).

The Full Members category is open to associations and bodies representing hospitals and healthcare service organizations, such as national or regional hospital associations, and ministries of health.

The Premier Members category is open to hospital and healthcare organizations with five or more facilities, as well as entities such as healthcare purchasing companies.

The Associates Members category includes individual or small groups of private and public hospitals, medical centres, and professional associations.

The IHF also confers the status of Honorary Member on a small number of individuals who have rendered special services to the Federation.

=== Partners ===
The IHF maintains official relationships with international institutions, and has partnerships with several non-governmental organizations.

IHF partners range from not-for-profit, non- governmental, international associations to organizations of commercial entities. The IHF is a non-state Actor in Official Relations with the World Health Organization and in consultative status with the ECOSOC. The IHF collaborates with many international institutions such as the Organisation for Economic Co-operation and Development (OECD) and the International Finance Corporation (IFC).

The IHF also partners with many international NGOs such as the International Council of Nurses (ICN), the World Medical Association (WMA), the International Network of Health Promoting Hospitals and Health Services (HPH), the International Society for Quality in Health Care (ISQua), the International Alliance of Patients' Organizations (IAPO), the Geneva Health Forum, the International Committee of the Red Cross (ICRC), the International Federation of Pharmaceutical Manufacturers & Associations (IFPMA), the Union for International Cancer Control (UICC), the World Organization of Family Doctors (WONCA), the World Federation of Public Health Associations (WFPHA) among others.

== Activities ==
The IHF is the only global membership organization for leaders in the health sector. It connect healthcare leaders, supporting them to excel through training and development. Its networks and forums support international, peer to peer knowledge exchange. The events, programmes, and special interest groups showcase good practices. And it works in partnership with international organizations on key issues for its members.

The annual World Hospital Congress is organized by the IHF to promote global learning that leads to local action, proving an opportunity for knowledge exchange and networking that can transform healthcare delivery worldwide.

At the Congress, the IHF Awards ceremony is held, celebrating excellent projects, programmes, and initiatives in hospitals and health service providers across the globe. The IHF Awards were launched in 2015.

The IHF Leadership Model underpins the leadership development activities offered by the IHF, strengthening global capacity for hospital management. The activities include a programme for Young Executive Leaders, Association Leaders, and Women in Leadership.

The Geneva Sustainability Centre's activities include standards for environmental sustainability, a capacity-strengthening learning programme and tools for executives, and the Sustainability Accelerator Tool, which enables strategic action planning and decision making to advance low-carbon and resilient healthcare delivery.
