= Kangaroo Ground =

Town in Victoria, Australia

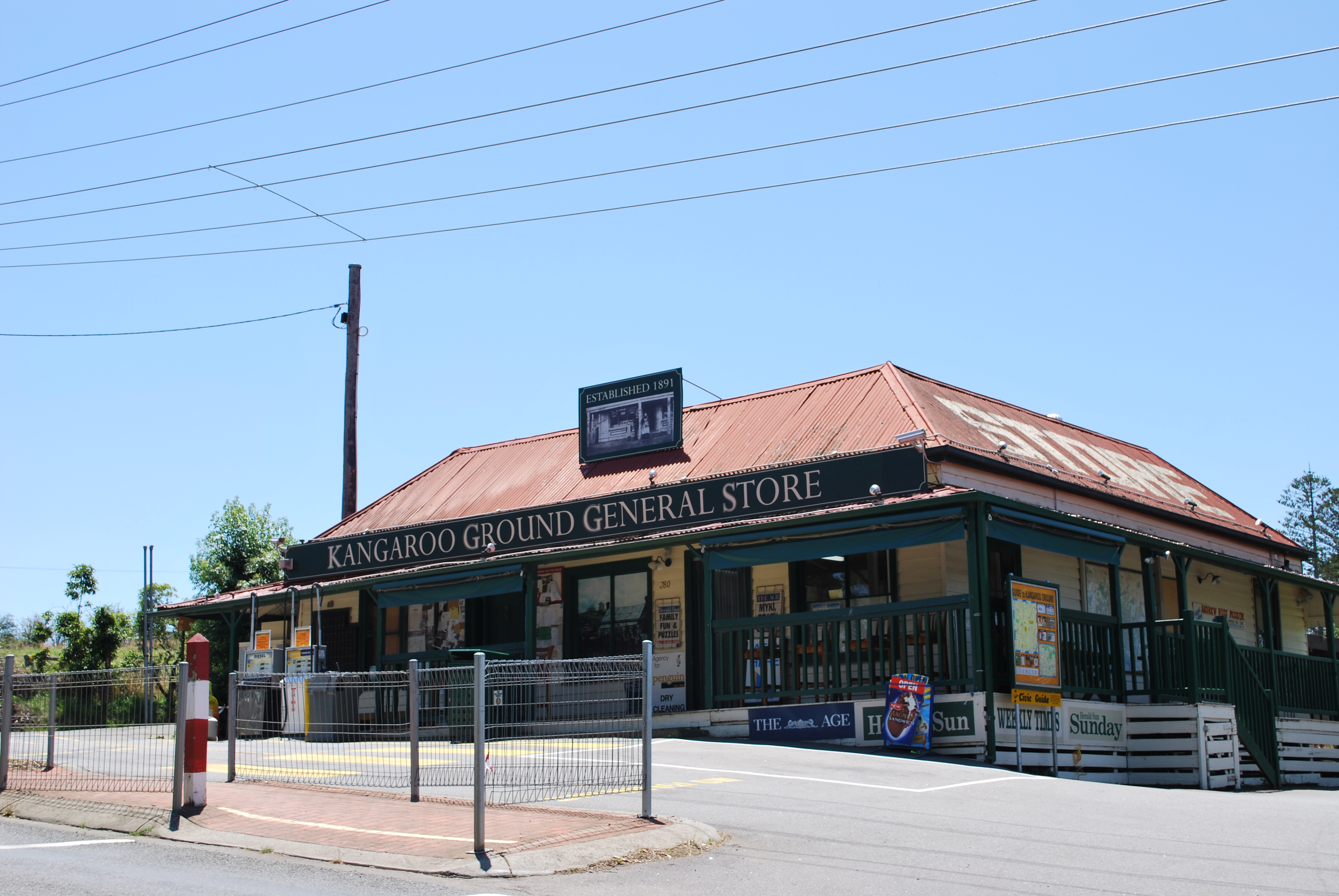
- General store

- Interactive map of Kangaroo Ground
- Coordinates: 37°41′27″S 145°12′57″E
- Country: Australia
- State: Victoria
- LGA: Shire of Nillumbik
- Location: 26 km (16 mi) from Melbourne; 10 km (6.2 mi) from Hurstbridge

Government
  - State electorate: Eildon
  - Federal divisions: Jagajaga; Casey

Population
  - Total: 1,208 (2021 census)
- Postcode: 3097
Localities around Kangaroo Ground
Wattle Glen	Panton Hill	Christmas Hills
Diamond Creek	Kangaroo Ground	Watsons Creek
Research	Warrandyte North	Wonga Park

Kangaroo Ground is a town in Victoria, Australia, 26 km north-east of Melbourne's Central Business District, located within the Shire of Nillumbik local government area. Kangaroo Ground recorded a population of 1,208 at the 2021 census.

There are two sources for the origin of the name. The name arises from the extraordinary richness of the locality with kangaroo grass before it was settled. It is a descriptive term, apparently coined by William Ryrie but first formally recorded in February 1838 by Robert Hoddle in his diary: "Crossed a creek nearly dry and entered some forest land distant from Melbourne called Kangaroo Grounds.... It abounds in kangaroos, hence its name."

== History ==
An agricultural district, Kangaroo Ground was considered one of the oldest and richest in the early History of Victoria, due to the extraordinary richness of its soil. It was on the road to the Woods Point gold diggings. The Kangaroo Ground Post Office opened on 4 October 1854. In the centre of the district stands a high knoll, known as Garden Hill occupied by Kangaroo Ground War Memorial Park. In 1874 views could be seen of the Kew Asylum and ships coming up Hobson's Bay. The earliest settler in the area was Mr Donaldson who purchased land when it part of New South Wales holdings.

Kangaroo Ground is one of the earliest settled areas of the Shire of Nillumbik. At one time it rivalled Eltham as the major centre of the former Shire of Eltham. A sugar gum tree on a road reserve in the centre of the town is an especially large specimen and is considered significant as a rare example of this species of eucalyptus commonly planted elsewhere in the early 1900s. Similarly a very mature remnant manna gum of the former indigenous landscape is a local landmark tree of significant size and age and considered significant.

In 1878 while on a trip to England, John Donaldson visited Windsor Great Park where he collected some acorns. He returned to Kangaroo Ground and planted them on his property Kangaroo Hall. The quercus robur or oak tree was estimated to be 110 years old in 2004.

In 1878 the Presbyterian Church was constructed of polychrome brick and is attributed to the architect C. W. Maplestone. In 1892 a weatherboard vestry was added at the rear of the church. It is considered historically, architecturally, aesthetically, socially and spiritually significant to the Shire of Nillumbik.

The Pigeon Bank residence and garden commenced in the 1860s includes mature exotic site plantings and is considered historically and aesthetically significant to the Shire of Nillumbik. The house is associated with Francis Rogerson, an early pioneer, and politician Ewan Cameron who lived at the property from 1874 until 1915. Cameron farmed one hundred acres or forty hectares on this property. He married Agnes Bell, daughter of John Bell, a farmer also of Kangaroo Ground. They had eight sons and three daughters. Cameron died at Kangaroo Ground on 27 September 1915.

Hawthorn hedges (or crateaegus monogyna) were planted about 1860s to the 1870s in the area, reflecting the adoption of European farming techniques by European settlers. Some hedges remain and are considered historically and aesthetically significant to the Shire of Nillumbik.

The Wippell Farm complex consists of a surviving timber slab farm building representative of the complex Victorian and Edwardian-era farming at Kangaroo Ground. Rare mature planting remains on the site which is considered significant to the Nillumbik Shire and are listed on the Victorian Heritage Database.

The nineteenth century Garden Hill weatherboard house and its associated shearing shed are historically and aesthetically significant to the Shire of Nillumbik. It was modest accommodation for local pioneer Andrew Harkness. The house is also historically significant for its association with industrialist and philanthropist Sir Henry Gepp and his association with a Canary Island palm on the property. The home is near the Kangaroo Ground War Memorial Park and affords a view extending to Kinglake.

A building which accommodated the Evelyn Observer newspaper was built on top of a local hill about 1874. After the transfer of the newspaper to an office in Hurstbridge, Eltham Shire Council purchased the property. It was subsequently used as the building for the Eltham Shire Offices. It was destroyed in a fire in 1934.

In 1892 the Kangaroo Ground Fire Brigade was formed. Members have fought in a number of fires including the Black Saturday bushfires. In 1980 a new station was built. It has been extended a number of times since. In 2017 it had about 70 members.

In 1964 local families established the Kangaroo Ground Pony Club. In 1988 land was purchased which was developed into an equestrian facility of six arenas, a mount rig, a cross country course, sheds and clubhouse. Kangaroo Ground Adult Riders also ride on these grounds.

== Facilities ==
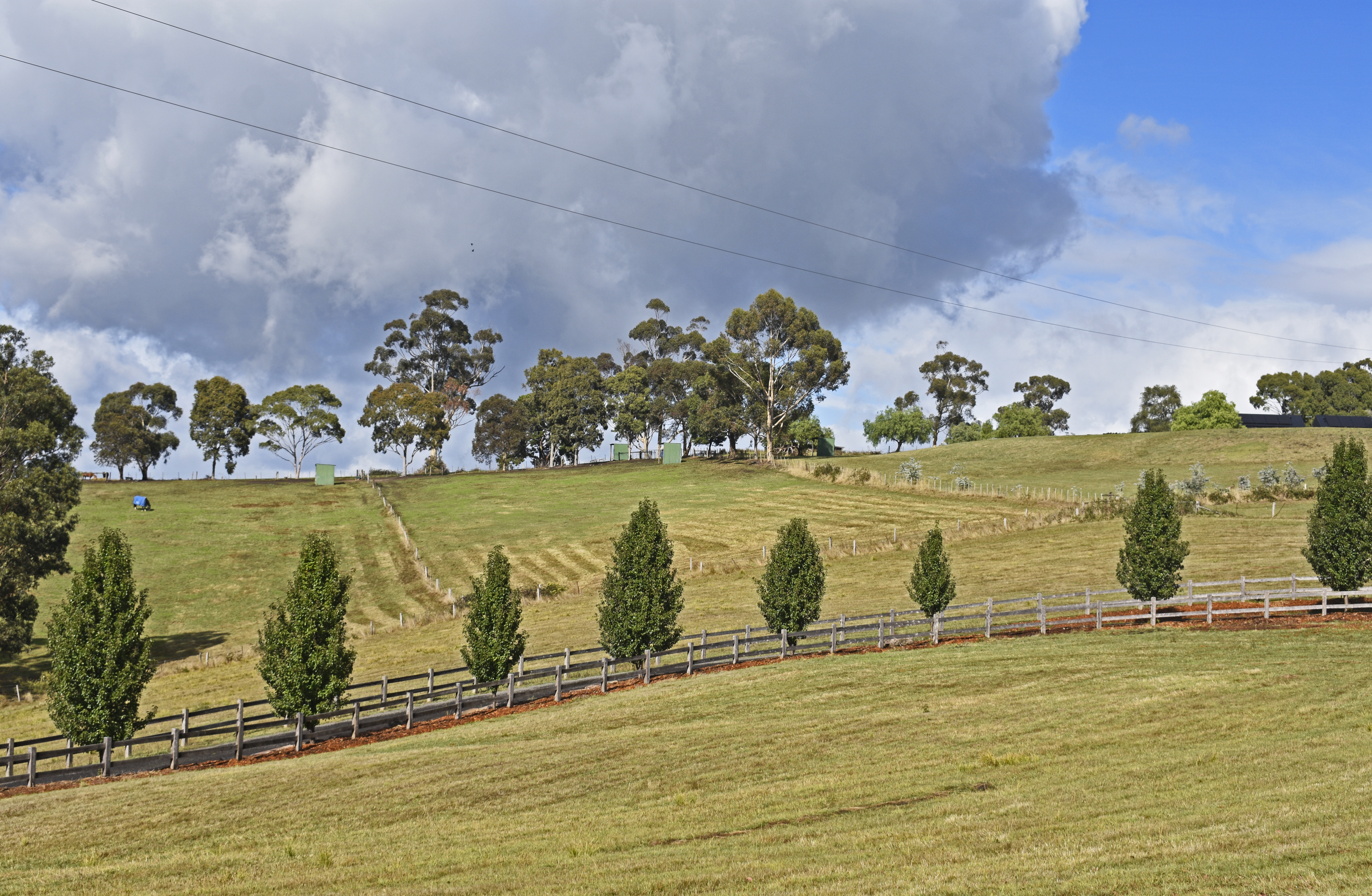
Landscape along Nicholas Lane

A school has operated in the district since 1851. The first school master was Andrew Ross. His diaries of that time have been published. The School was established circa 1878 with a school room to the west established circa 1887. The School includes a residence built circa 1879 with a small room built on the front verandah of the residence in the 1920s. This served as a State Savings bank agency until 1934. A bathroom and rear porch were built about 1937. The School and residence are considered historically, socially and aesthetically significant to the Shire of Nillumbik and are on the Victorian Heritage Database. The residence was used by the Eltham District Historical Society and subsequently by the Andrew Ross Museum. The house is used for displays and houses a collection which focuses on the first schoolmaster Andrew Ross and the region's farming history

Kangaroo Ground Pre-School operates on the same site as the Kangaroo Ground Primary School. The General Store and Post Office has a long association with Kangaroo Ground and has been an important centre of community life since about 1900. Shire of Eltham council meetings used to be conducted in the front room of the store. The store is considered socially and historically significant and is on the Victorian Heritage Database.

Its post office is reputed to be the only one in Australia which is also a winery. Winemaker Ken King integrated the post office into his winery.

The Kangaroo Ground Emergency Operations Centre was constructed in 1988 of mudbrick, a version of the "Eltham style" and features a central entry with a tile mural. It is considered architecturally, aesthetically, socially and historically significant to the Shire of Nillumbik and is registered on the Victorian Heritage Database.

Weller's Hotel was built in 1872 and is considered historically significant to the Shire of Nillumbik. It has served as a hotel, store and staging post for Cobb & Co coaches bound for the goldfields. The restaurant is now known as Fondata 1872.

The first burial at the Kangaroo Ground cemetery was a child Judith Furphy, who died 17 May 1851. Early pioneering families represented in the cemetery include Armstrong, Barr, Bell, Harkness, Jardine, Johnston, Rogerson, Stevenson, Thomson and Walters. Others buried there include feminist and journalist Irene Frances Taylor.

Kangaroo Ground is the Australian headquarters for Wycliffe Australia, part of the Wycliffe Global Alliance. Volunteer translators work to translate the Bible. In 1967 donated land and money was raised to develop a national centre. Mudbrick architect Alistair Knox designed the centre at no charge. Volunteers made mudbricks and planted thousands of native plants on the property of 11 hectares.

A mobile library operated by Yarra Plenty Regional Library regularly visits the town.

== Demographics ==
In the 2021 Australian Census, the population of Kangaroo Ground was 1,208. Of those, 49.5% were male and 50.5% were female. The median age of residents was 44 years, 6 years older than the state and national median of 38 years. 40.8% of the population claimed Australian ancestry, with the other top ancestries being English (39.6%), Scottish (13.7%), Irish (10.4%), and Italian (6.1%). 49.1% had no religious affiliation, 16% were Catholic, 9.3% were Anglican, 4.9% were Christian, and 7.1% chose not to say.

== See also ==
- Shire of Eltham – Kangaroo Ground was previously within this former local government area.
