= Jessie McPherson Private Hospital =

Coordinates: 37.9194°S 145.1214°E

Geography
- Location: Clayton, Victoria, Australia

Organisation
- Care system: Private
- Type: Specialist
- Affiliated university: Monash University

Services
- Speciality: Maternity

History
- Opened: December 1930

Links
- Website: jessiemcpherson.org
- Lists: Hospitals in Australia

Jessie McPherson Private Hospital is a private hospital co-located with Monash Medical Centre in the Melbourne suburb of Clayton. It provides private health care to people in Melbourne, regional Victoria, interstate and overseas.

== History ==
Jessie McPherson Private Hospital was first established in December 1930 in a central Melbourne church hall when a group of female doctors recognised the need for a new hospital to treat the city's ailing female population. The hospital became a reality when the then Premier of Victoria, Sir William McPherson donated £25,000 to build a hospital in memory of his mother, Mrs Jessie McPherson. The hospital was built adjacent to the old Queen Victoria Hospital, Melbourne in William Street in Melbourne's CBD and was named Jessie McPherson Community Hospital.

Subsequently, the Queen Victoria Hospital management was ordered by the then government to transfer its control over Jessie McPherson Community Hospital, so that the Cancer Institute could set up a new treatment centre in that location.

The hospital later moved to the intermediate section of the Queen Victoria Hospital in Lonsdale Street.

In 1987, the hospital moved to its present home in Clayton and is co-located with Monash Health's Monash Medical Centre. The Queen Victoria Hospital moved at the same time, becoming part of the Monash Medical Centre.

== Notable births ==
- Cate Blanchett, 14 May 1969

== See also ==
- Healthcare in Australia
