= Research, Victoria =

Research
- Suburb
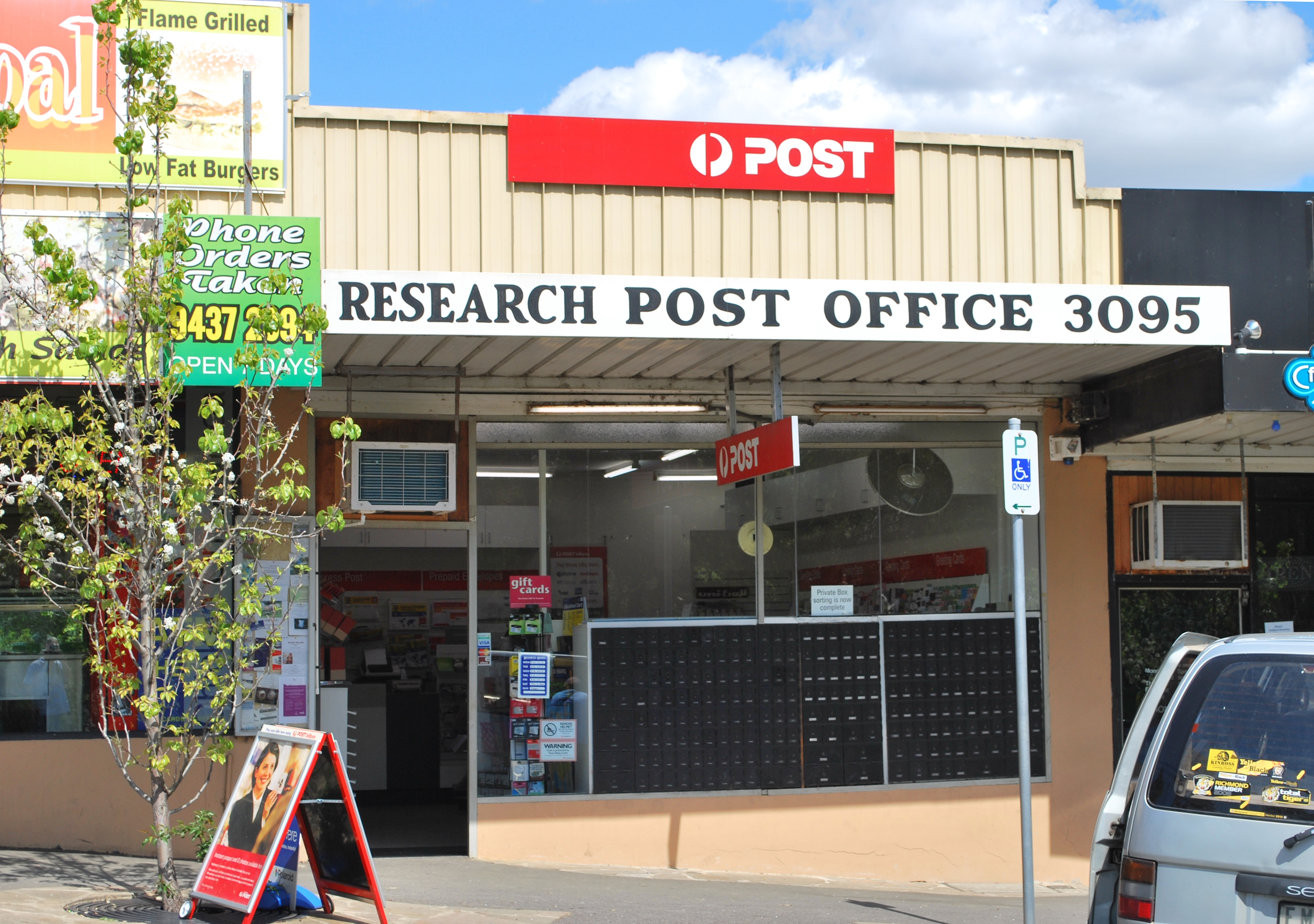
- Post office

- Interactive map of Research
- Coordinates: 37.707°S 145.18°E
- Country: Australia
- State: Victoria
- City: Melbourne
- LGA: Shire of Nillumbik
- Location: 28 km (17 mi) from Melbourne

Government
  - State electorate: Eltham
  - Federal division: Jagajaga

Area
  - Total: 4.6 km^{2} (1.8 sq mi)

Population
  - Total: 2,695 (2021 census)
  - Density: 586/km^{2} (1,517/sq mi)
- Postcode: 3095
Suburbs around Research
Diamond Creek	Kangaroo Ground	Kangaroo Ground
Eltham North	Research	Kangaroo Ground
Eltham	Eltham	Warrandyte North

Research is a suburb of Melbourne, Victoria, Australia, 24 kilometres (15 mi) north-east from Melbourne's Central Business District, located within the Shire of Nillumbik local government area. Research recorded a population of 2,695 at the 2021 census.

== History ==
Settled in the 1850s, Research was the location of extensive orchards by the 1860s. The unusual name arose from the Victorian gold rush of the time. At first, the locality was known as Swiper's Gully, and gold prospecting proved unsuccessful there. Later, gold was found after the gully was searched again. Swiper's Gully then became Research Gully, and finally, late in the 19th century, abbreviated to Research.

Research Post Office opened on 20 October 1902.

== Community ==
Much of Research today consists of 1- to 35-acre blocks. This area has one of the highest bushfire risks in Australia, due to prolific Eucalyptus and Melaleuca Paperbark trees. Consequently, a diverse variety of fauna and flora exist in this ecologically protected zone.

Research has a variety of facilities, including the Research Football Club, Scout Hall, Tennis Club, Research CFA, Eltham Little Theatre, Balance Gymnastics Club, Eltham Martial Arts Gym, Bushman Fridges and Micky's Fitness Gym.

The nearest public library is Eltham Library, operated by Yarra Plenty Regional Library.

== Education ==
The schools in Research include Eltham College and Research Primary School. Eltham College comprises both a junior and senior school.

Eltham College and Research Primary are both situated on Main Road.

== Sport ==
Research is the home of the Research Junior Football Club, which competes in the Northern Football League. They play their home games at Research Park, located on Main Road, Research. Research Cricket Club and Eltham Collegians Cricket Club were both Diamond Valley Cricket Association teams based in Research, until they merged in 2010 to form one club. Their home games are played at Research Park and Eltham College Oval. Research Baseball Club, which plays in the Melbourne Winter Baseball League, are based in Research, but play their home games in Lower Plenty. Research Tennis Club play their home games at the Research Park Tennis Courts.

For more than three decades (1958 to 1991) there was a Research Senior Football Club in addition to the Juniors. Initially it was a team in the Panton Hill Football League and won premierships in 1984 and 1985 (see listing on the Panton Hill Football League website under the heading Former Clubs). In 1986, the Club transferred to the Diamond Valley Football League (now the Northern Football Netball League) where it competed until the end of the 1991 season (see listing on website of the Northern Football Netball League under the heading Former Clubs). After some unacceptable behaviour on and off field by some players and supporters, the club was suspended for the entire 1992 season. Subsequently, the Club decided to disband. The Junior Football Club (see above) continued operating as a separate entity. Further detail about the history of the Research Senior Football Club can be found on its website.

== See also ==
- Shire of Eltham – Research was previously within this former local government area.
