= Christmas Hills, Victoria =

Christmas Hills
- Town
- Interactive map of Christmas Hills
- Coordinates: 37°39′05″S 145°19′02″E
- Country: Australia
- State: Victoria
- LGA: Shire of Nillumbik
- Location: 44 km (27 mi) from Melbourne
- Established: 1884

Government
  - State electorate: Eildon
  - Federal division: Casey
- Elevation: 152 m (499 ft)

Population
  - Total: 365 (2021 census)
- Postcode: 3775
Localities around Christmas Hills
Smiths Gully	Smiths Gully	St Andrews
Panton Hill	Christmas Hills	Yarra Glen
Kangaroo Ground	Bend of Islands	Yering

Christmas Hills is a locality in Victoria, Australia, 35 km (22 mi) north-east of Melbourne's Central Business District, located within the Shire of Nillumbik local government area. Christmas Hills recorded a population of 365 at the 2021 census.

Christmas Hills is located between Kangaroo Ground and Yarra Glen, along Eltham-Yarra Glen Road (State Route C726), north of the Yarra River, in the Dandenong Ranges. In 1904, the Australian Handbook described Christmas Hills as "an excellent health resort".

The locality is very hilly, with One Tree Hill in the northwest rising to 372 m (1,220 ft) above sea level, and is home to several reserves, including One Tree Hill Reserve and Sugarloaf Reservoir Park, opened in 1980 and managed by Melbourne Water.

== History ==
Christmas Hills owes its name to an emancipated convict and shepherd, David Christmas, who became lost on a 640-acre (2.6 km^{2}) grazing lease in the area in 1842, and was found after days of wandering at a rise which was subsequently named after him. The area was considered to have poor quality soil, although nearby settlers earned an income from chopping firewood in the sclerophyll forests.

Gold was discovered at One Tree Hill in 1859, fuelling a brief goldrush. Quartz reef operations ended in 1864, and alluvial mining continued until 1908.

The area grew considerably in the 1870s; at one point the township had two hotels, two schools, a post office and a Mechanics' Institute.

The Post Office opened on 10 December 1874 as Christmas Hill, was renamed in 1913, and closed in 1974.

In 1884, a primary school was built, and by 1912, when the railway from Heidelberg to Hurstbridge was built, the area had a population of 146 and had become a tourist destination, popular with Melburnians seeking "clean air and an invigorating climate".

In 1893, 1939, 1962 and 2009, the area suffered from destructive bushfires.

== Present day ==
Christmas Hills today is a large area encompassing several districts.

=== Christmas Hills township ===
Christmas Hills consists of a cluster of homes, a public hall, a tennis court, a memorial park with a World War I monument and a fire brigade shed, erected after the 1939 bushfires. About one km (0.62 mi) to the west is Christmas Hills Primary School, first established in 1884, with an enrolment of 22 students in 2006. A mobile library service managed by Yarra Plenty Regional Library visits the community, parked at the school regularly.

=== Rob Roy ===
Rob Roy _{(37°38′56″S 145°17′10″E)} in the western part is used for a range of hill racing events by the MG Car Club of Victoria. It was first established in 1937 by motoring enthusiasts and the Light Car Club for hill-racing motorbikes and cars and was utilised as a venue well into the postwar years. Initially a dirt track, it was fully bitumenised in 1939. It was burnt out in 1962, and abandoned. The MGCC took out a lease on the property in 1992, and rebuilt all the facilities, running the first meeting of the "modern era" in February 1993.

=== One Tree Hill ===
One Tree Hill _{(37°37′59″S 145°18′36″E)}, a former mining area in northwestern Christmas Hills, is now a 143 hectare reserve managed by Parks Victoria. Its main features are Happy Valley Creek, which runs through the reserve, and the 372 m (1,220 ft) One Tree Hill in the northeast. According to the Land Conservation Council of Victoria, it has been assessed as "being of State botanical significance for its ecological integrity and viability, rarity and representation of community types", and is home to 22 species assessed as regionally threatened, rare or restricted in the greater Melbourne area, including roosting colonies of large bent-wing bat and eastern horseshoe bat, and the powerful owl, brush-tailed phascogale and barking owl. The LCC reports that 79 bird, 24 mammal, 7 reptile and 7 frog species have been recorded in the reserve.

=== Sugarloaf Reservoir ===
Sugarloaf Reservoir
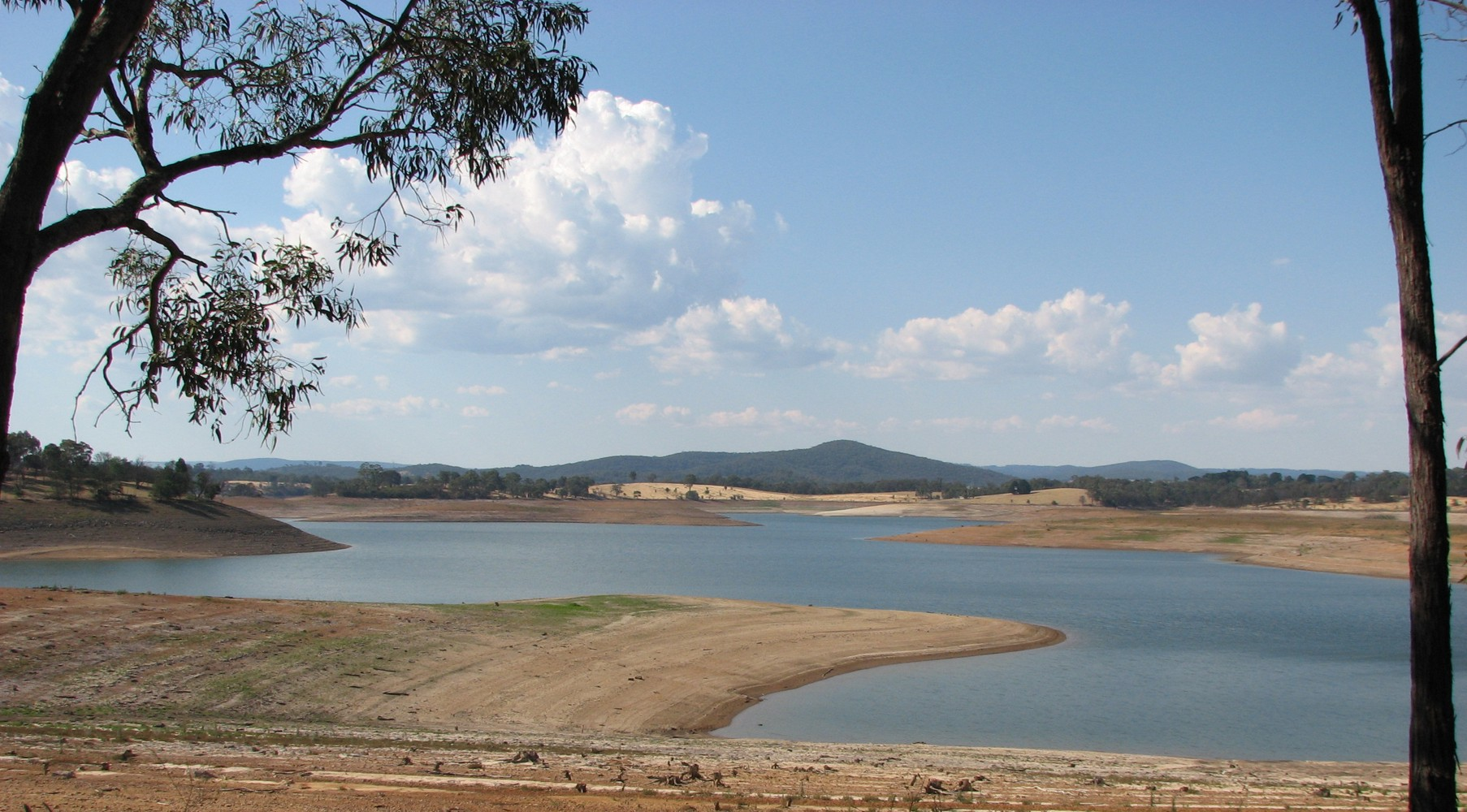
- The reservoir at just under half capacity

- Location within Victoria
- Location: Christmas Hills, Victoria
- Coordinates: 37°40′30″S 145°17′33″E
- Lake type: reservoir
- Primary inflows: Maroondah Aqueduct, Yarra River
- Basin countries: Australia
- Surface area: 4.4 km^{2} (1.7 sq mi)

Sugarloaf Reservoir (37°40′30″S 145°17′33″E) is a 440-hectare reservoir which has a total water capacity of 96,000 megalitres, and was developed in the late 1970s and completed in 1981. It is managed by Melbourne Water and supplies scheme water to Melbourne's northern, western and inner suburbs. Sugarloaf is fed by the Maroondah Aqueduct and the Yarra River, and before entering the domestic water supply, water is treated at the Winneke Water Treatment Plant on the south bank of the reservoir to World Health Organization guidelines. The main dam is 89 m high and 1,050 m long.

Around the reservoir is the Sugarloaf Reservoir Park, which opened in 1982 and is managed by Parks Victoria. The park's entrance, open during most daylight hours, is 1.2 km (0.75 mi) off Eltham-Yarra Glen Road. Barbecue and picnic facilities are available at Saddle Dam, south-east of the dam wall, and Ridge Park to the North. Several walking trails can be used with permission of Parks Victoria. Watercraft are only permitted to launch from the Sugarloaf Sailing Club on the north bank, and sail boards, keel boats and/or craft with cabins, cooking or toilet facilities are not permitted on the Reservoir. The area is home to eastern grey kangaroos, echidnas, wedge-tailed eagles, crimson rosellas and other wildlife including a population of deer. Vegetation ranges from grassland, having been cleared for agriculture in the decades prior to the reservoir's construction, to dry forest.

== See also ==
- Shire of Eltham – Parts of Christmas Hills were previously within this former local government area.
- Shire of Healesville – Parts of Christmas Hills were previously within this former local government area.
