= Shire of Nillumbik =

Coordinates: 37°38′S 145°14′E

- Local government area
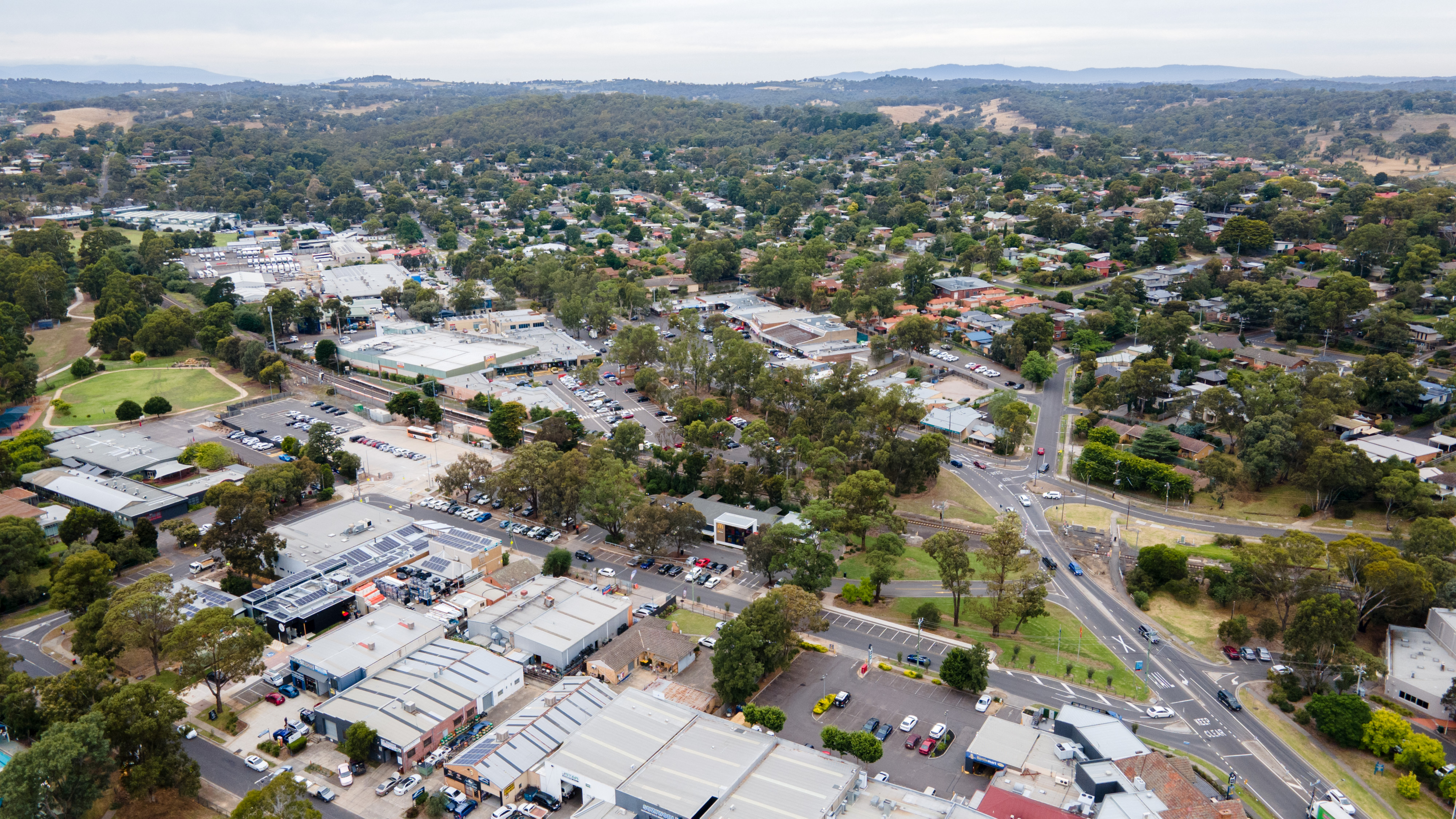
- Aerial view of Diamond Creek in Shire of Nillumbik
- Interactive map of Shire of Nillumbik
- Country: Australia
- State: Victoria
- Region: Greater Melbourne
- Established: 1994
- Council seat: Greensborough

Government
  - Mayor: Cr Naomi Joiner
  - State electorates: Bundoora; Eildon; Eltham; Warrandyte; Yan Yean
  - Federal divisions: Casey; Jagajaga; McEwen

Area
  - Total: 432 km^{2} (167 sq mi)

Population
  - Total: 62,895 (2021)
  - Density: 145.59/km^{2} (377.1/sq mi)
- Website: Shire of Nillumbik
LGAs around Shire of Nillumbik
Whittlesea	Murrindindi	Murrindindi
Whittlesea	Shire of Nillumbik	Yarra Ranges
Banyule	Manningham	Yarra Ranges

The Shire of Nillumbik (/ˈnɪləmbɪk/ NILL-əm-bik) is a local government area in Victoria, Australia. It contains Melbourne's outer north-eastern suburbs, including the major centres of Eltham and Diamond Creek, as well as numerous rural localities beyond the urban area. It has an area of 432 square kilometres and at the 2021 census, the Shire had a population of 62,895. The Shire uses the tag-line The Green Wedge Shire. The Nillumbik Council offices are located in Civic Drive, Greensborough.

The shire's name is derived from the Parish of Nillumbik, which was named in the 1830s, the term nyilum bik meaning "bad earth" or "red earth" in the local Aboriginal language Woiwurrung.

Nillumbik was rated third of 590 Australian local government areas in the Bankwest Quality of Life Index 2008.

== History ==
=== Formation ===
In the early 1980s, a group known as the "Rural Shire Action Committee" pushed for the creation of a "Green Wedge" shire in the area. This was to have had similar boundaries to modern Nillumbik, but would have excluded the non-Green Wedge-zoned areas of Yarrambat and North Warrandyte and the built-up areas of Diamond Creek, Eltham and Research. The proposal was investigated and reported on by the State Government's Local Government Commission, but ultimately no action was taken.

The concept of the Green Wedge shire re-emerged during the major overhaul of local government in the early 1990s. This time, the proposed boundaries included a sufficient urban population base to sustain key municipal services such as libraries and a pool. In 1994, the Shire of Nillumbik was formed from the merger of:

- the Shire of Eltham (less Montmorency, Lower Plenty, and properties accessed from the top of the Great Dividing Range),
- the Diamond Creek, Plenty and Yarrambat areas of the Shire of Diamond Valley,
- the Christmas Hills and Bend of Islands areas of the Shire of Healesville, and
- the Arthurs Creek area and the rural part of Doreen from the City of Whittlesea.

The name "Nillumbik" for the new shire was suggested by the Shire of Diamond Valley; other proposed names included "Shire of Montsalvat" (the government review board's initial proposal) and "Shire of McCubbin" (also put forward by Diamond Valley).

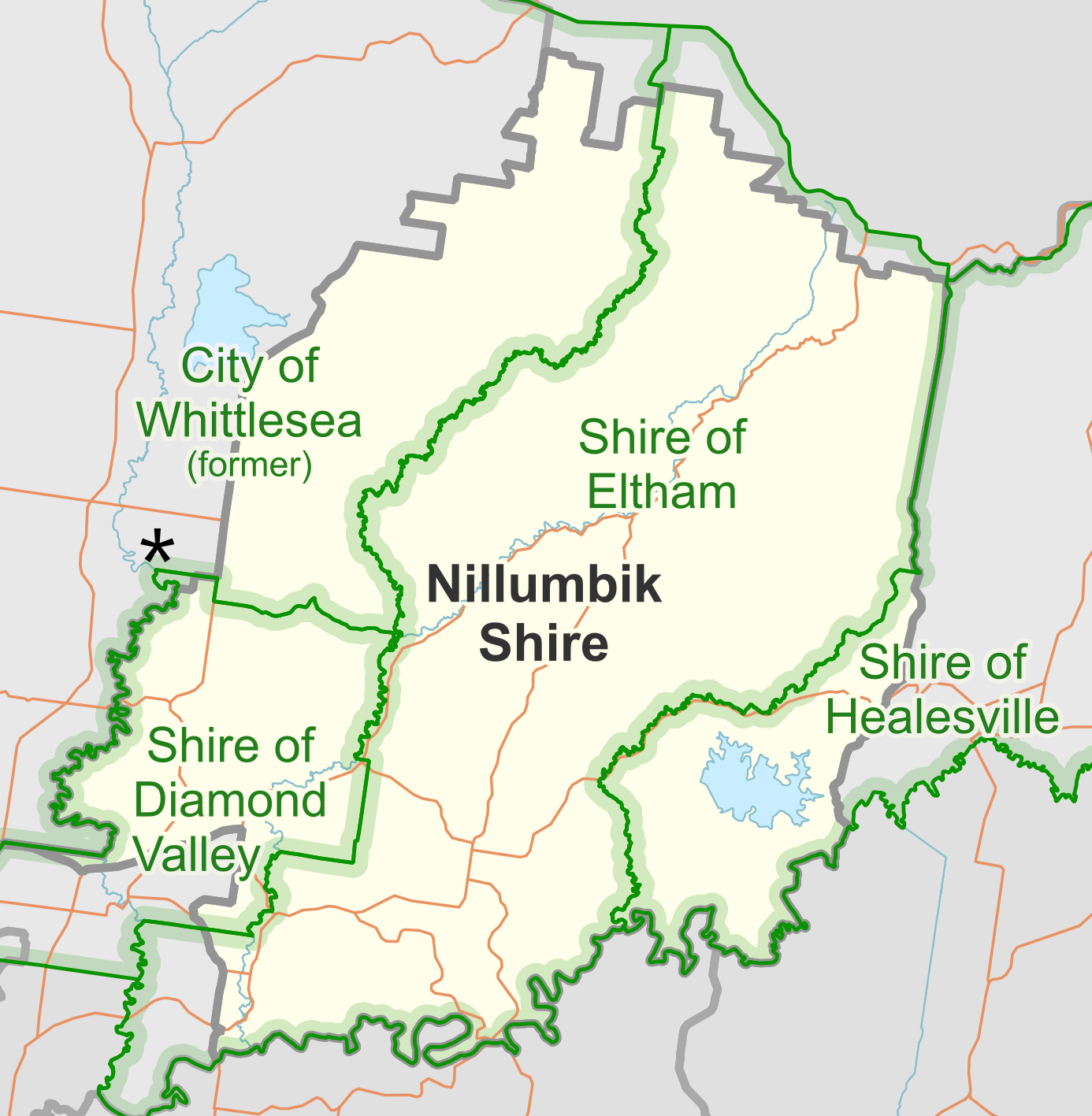
A map of Nillumbik Shire showing the predecessor LGAs that overlapped the area before the 1994 local government amalgamations 🞲 The extreme north-west corner of the former Shire of Diamond Valley was transferred from Nillumbik to the City of Whittlesea in 1999

=== As a council ===
On 13 October 1998, the five councillors of Nillumbik Council were suspended by then Local Government minister Rob Maclellan, with the state government declaring that infighting was affecting the ability of the council to function. The number of councillors was subsequently increased to seven.

== Council ==
2020 and 2024 ward boundaries. Expand the map and click on a ward to see the ward name.

The current council was elected in October 2024 for a four-year term.

Ward	Party	Councillors	Notes
Blue Lake	Independent	Grant Brooker	
Bunjil	Independent Labor	Naomi Joiner	Mayor
Edendale	Independent	Kelly Joy	
Ellis	Independent	Peter Perkins	
Sugarloaf	Independent	Kim Cope	
Swipers Gully	Greens	Kate McKay	Deputy Mayor
Wingrove	Independent	John Dumaresq	

== Townships and localities ==
The 2021 census recorded the shire population at 62,895, up from 61,273 in the 2016 census.

Population
Locality	2016	2021
Arthurs Creek	496	478
Bend of Islands	295	267
Christmas Hills	355	365
Cottles Bridge	601	609
Diamond Creek	11,733	12,503
Doreen^	21,298	27,122
Eltham	18,314	18,847
Eltham North^	6,805	6,830
Greensborough^	20,821	21,070
Hurstbridge	3,450	3,554
Kangaroo Ground	1,095	1,208
Kinglake^	1,536	1,662
Kinglake West^	1,166	1,305
North Warrandyte	2,956	3,027
Nutfield	152	158
Panton Hill	1,062	1,063
Plenty	2,364	2,575
Research	2,649	2,695
Smiths Gully	369	356
St Andrews	1,226	1,186
Strathewen	178	198
Watsons Creek	51	58
Wattle Glen	1,961	1,911
Yan Yean^	252	246
Yarrambat	1,588	1,602

^ - Territory divided with another LGA

== Facilities ==
Nillumbik's oldest public building is the Eltham courthouse which was restored in 2022.

Eltham Library and Diamond Valley Library located in Greensborough are operated by Yarra Plenty Regional Library A mobile library service is also operated by Yarra Plenty Regional Library serving the locations of Doreen, Panton Hill, St Andrews, Hurstbridge, North Warrandye, Kangaroo Ground, Diamond Creek and Christmas Hills.

Nillumbikk U3A provides a wide range of courses open to all retired and semi-retired people

NillumBUG is a bicycle user group for the Nillumbik Shire.

== See also ==
- Shire of Eltham
