= Los Alamos High School =

Location
- 1300 Diamond Drive; Los Alamos, New Mexico 87544; United States; 35°53′10.16″N 106°19′0.81″W

Information
- Type: Public
- Established: 1946
- School district: Los Alamos Public Schools
- CEEB code: 320405
- NCES School ID: 350165000431
- Principal: Jill Gonzales
- Staff: 81.44
- Faculty: 256
- Grades: 9–12
- Enrollment: 1,181 (2024-2025)
- Student to teacher ratio: 14.50
- Colors: Forest green & gold
- Team name: Hilltoppers
- Website: lahs.laschools.net

Los Alamos High School (LAHS) is the public high school in Los Alamos, New Mexico, United States. The school opened in 1946, and was originally supported by the Atomic Energy Commission. The school has been visited by two U.S. presidents: John F. Kennedy and Bill Clinton.

LAHS currently competes in the New Mexico Activities Association's District 2, AAAA division for athletics. The school has won more than 111 state championships.

== History ==
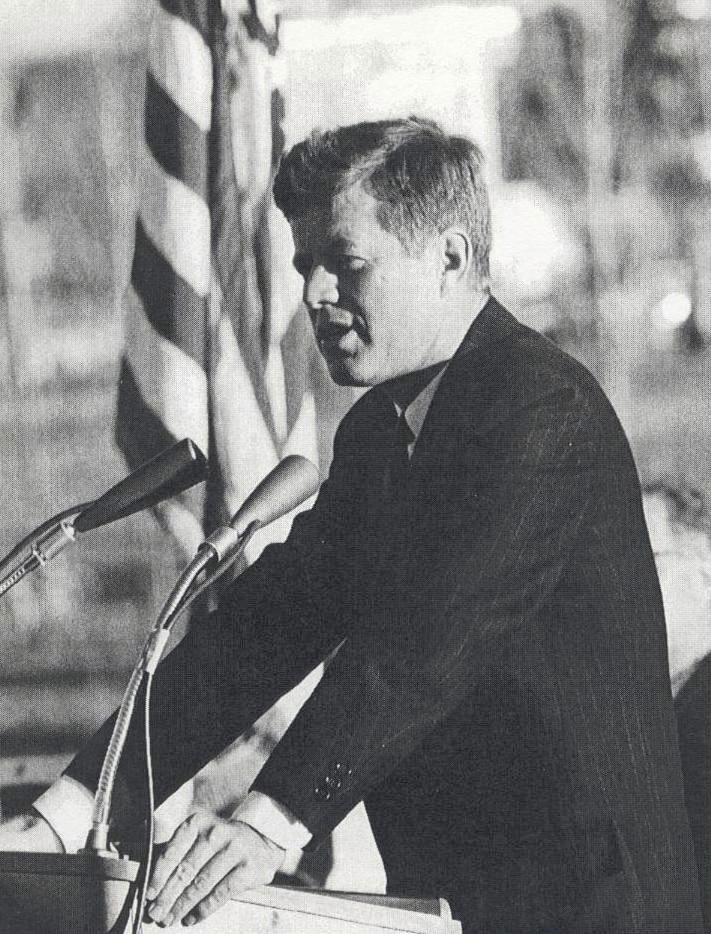
John F. Kennedy at the High School Football Stadium, Los Alamos, New Mexico. December 7, 1962

Los Alamos High School was the second high school built in Los Alamos. Prior to World War II, the Los Alamos Ranch School functioned as a boarding school for wealthy easterners that combined elements of a college preparatory school with a rugged frontier life. In 1942 Los Alamos was chosen to be the site of the Manhattan Project. The US Government acquired the property of the Ranch School through eminent domain, and the school was shut down in 1943.

During wartime, structures in Los Alamos were temporary because people were expecting to leave after the wartime project was completed. In August 1945, following the Allied victory in Japan, it was decided the Los Alamos Laboratory's nuclear research would continue in order to counter a rising Soviet threat. In 1946 Los Alamos begin erecting permanent structures, including Los Alamos High School. Life during the war and post-war transition was difficult for the first students of LAHS. "'[We were] normal teenagers trying to have a normal life in very adverse conditions," said Dan Nelis, one of the school's original students.

In 1946, much of the budget for construction and operation of the high school was provided directly by the Atomic Energy Commission instead of state or local taxes. This arrangement persisted under the Department of Energy and Washington has traditionally paid for a third of the school system's budget. Support from the federal government has been declining and was only 22% in the 2008–2009 academic year.

During the 1960s, LAHS began to attract attention for its consistent academic performance, low drop-out rate, and innovative teaching methods. President John F. Kennedy noted LAHS and other local schools during his visit to Los Alamos in 1962: "I've admired from some years ago, from reading an article about the kind of schools that you run here and the kind of boys and girls that you're bringing up." In 1964, after the assassination of President Kennedy, the community of Los Alamos erected a permanent memorial in his honor at the high school football field.

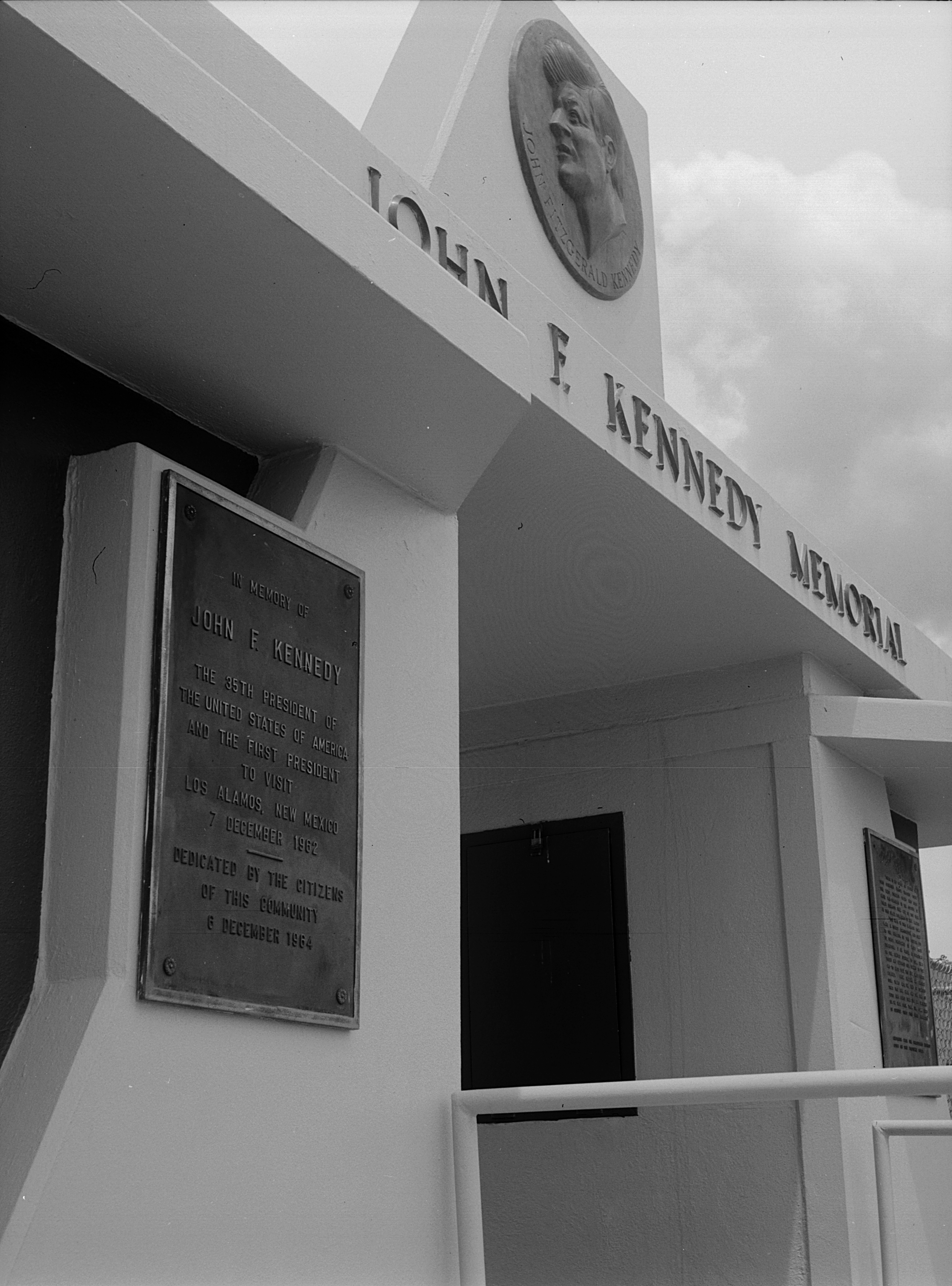
The John F. Kennedy Memorial at Los Alamos High School

President Bill Clinton spoke at the school in 1993. In his speech, he marked the community's technological contributions to national security, and envisioned a new Post-Cold War role for the town in promoting technological advancement and prosperity. In October 1995 a delegation of nuclear scientists from Sarov (Los Alamos's Russian sister city) visited Los Alamos to celebrate the 50th anniversary of the Allied Victory in WWII and the end of the Cold War. During their visit members of the delegation both attended and taught classes at Los Alamos High School and the University of New Mexico, Los Alamos. Clinton made an unscheduled appearance at LAHS in 1998 following a speech he gave at the Los Alamos National Laboratory. After passing students who had gathered to cheer his motorcade on his way to the speech, Clinton returned to greet the students and play saxophone.

In 2000, two students were killed before daylight on Good Friday while making a traditional religious pilgrimage to El Santuario de Chimayó. On May 10 many students lost their homes in the Cerro Grande Fire. The blaze also devastated the scenic forests and hillsides surrounding the school.

The school was used as a filming location for the 2010 film Let Me In, the American remake of the Swedish film Let the Right One In. Students from LAHS and the surrounding community participated as extras in the cast.

== Academics ==
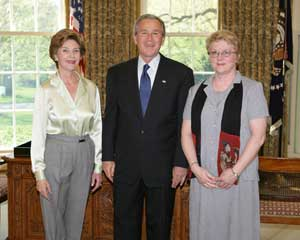
A LAHS teacher is honored by President George W. Bush as New Mexico State's Teacher of the Year. April 20, 2005.

Los Alamos High School's academic achievements have been recognized by a number of national publications. LAHS was ranked #780 out of 2,000 in Newsweek magazine's 2013 America's Best High School list. Los Alamos High School received "Silver Medal" ranking in 2013 as one of America's Best High Schools in an announcement by U.S. News & World Report on April 24, 2013. From a review of 21,035 U.S. public high schools, Los Alamos ranked 556th in the nation. Los Alamos ranking was up significantly from the 2012 "Silver Medal" ranking of 638th. LAHS was awarded a silver medal in U.S. News & World Report's Best High School Search 2008. In 2005 LAHS was named one of the "1,000 Best High Schools in America" (#649) by Newsweek. In 1998, LAHS was identified as a top performing public high-school in Class Struggle, a book by Washington Post education reporter Jay Mathews examining the public education system in America. The strength of LAHS's academic record has been associated with the academic nature of Los Alamos County, which has the highest concentration of PhDs per capita in the United States. LAHS is not a magnet school and does not have an admissions exam; any student living in Los Alamos is free to attend. Every year students from LAHS students are recognized for the achievements by the National Merit Scholarship Program, the National Hispanic Recognition Program, and the College Board's AP Scholar awards.

LAHS does not rank students, arguing that a focus on rank by potential universities can cause many excellent students to be overlooked. The GPAs of top students at LAHS are separated from each other by thousandths of a point.

63% of LAHS faculty have earned an advanced degree.

LAHS is accredited by the North Central Association of the New Mexico State Department of Education. The Department of Education frequently awards LAHS with an "Exemplary" rating for its academics. LAHS has consistently exceeded the Adequate Yearly Progress math and reading proficiency requirements of the No Child Left Behind Act for its student body at large. However, LAHS has sometimes failed to meet the requirements of AYP due to inadequate test scores among students with disabilities or insufficient participation of Caucasian students.

AYP testing results
School year	Proficiency in math (goal)	Proficiency in reading (goal)	School Rating	Designation	Reason if AYP not met
2010–11	79.01% (53%)	84.02 (64%)	Not met	SI-2	Insufficient math proficiency among students with disabilities (24.14%)
2009–10	66.30% (46%)	77.50% (60%)	Not met	SI-1	Insufficient participation rate of Caucasian students for AYP Math Test (93%). Insufficient math proficiency among students with disabilities (22.2%).
2008–09	69.50% (40%)	73.50% (56%)	Not met	SI-1	Insufficient math and reading proficiency among students with disabilities (17.1% and 20.0% respectively)
2007–08			Meets AYP	None	
2006–07	75.31% (22%)	79.01 (41%)	Meets AYP	None	
2005–06			Meets AYP		
2004–05	89.00% (35%)	92.00% (44%)	Not met		Insufficient participation rate of Caucasian students for AYP reading test (94%)

=== Curriculum ===
The Los Alamos High School has a standards-based curriculum and allows students to develop an individualized four-year plan. Advanced Placement (AP) courses are offered in German, Spanish, French, physics, biology, chemistry, environmental science, Calculus, statistics, English (both Lit. and Lang.), American history, European history, psychology, Fine Arts, and computers. Students also participate in NJROTC, educational work study, a building trades program, an automotive program, marketing and office technology courses, and concurrent enrollment at the University of New Mexico's Los Alamos Branch Campus which is located adjacent to the high school. Students who desire a different approach to education can apply to the School of Choice, a project-oriented, cooperative learning, interdisciplinary program. Comprehensive special education programs are available at all levels including work study and vocational training. Work-related courses for credit include student assistant and student intern (stipend), which involve work on campus; MAPS (Mentorship, Apprenticeship, Partnership), which places students in the community (credit only); and Co-op Work Experience, which employs students throughout the community.

== Student body ==
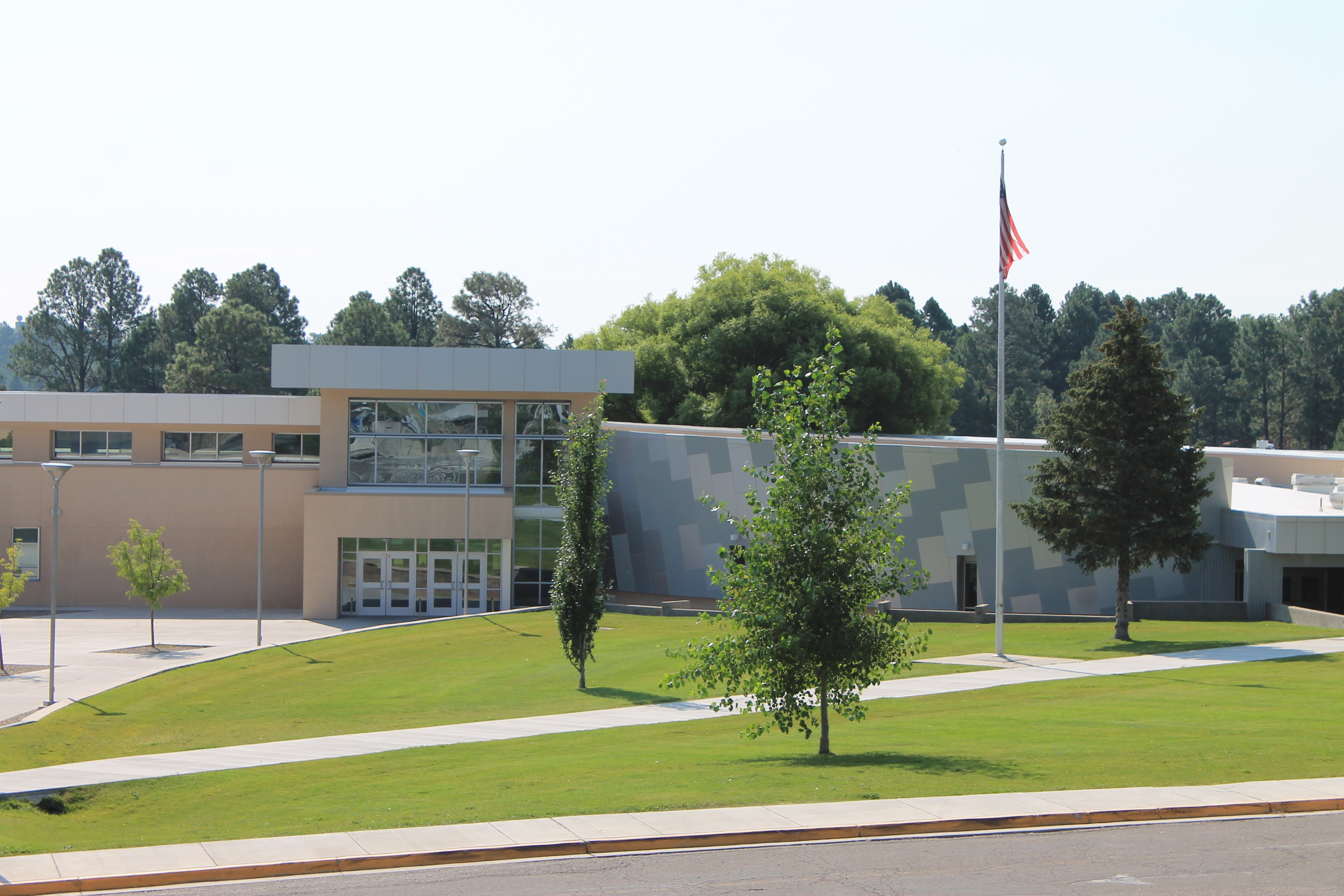
View of campus

Los Alamos High School is a suburban high school serving the entire county of Los Alamos, including White Rock, although some students from neighbouring counties attend as well. The median household income in Los Alamos County is $88,870 and few economically disadvantaged students attend LAHS. Elsewhere in New Mexico, LAHS is sometimes characterized as a school for the "rich". Most of the students at LAHS originate from Los Alamos Middle School, the only middle school in Los Alamos County.

Ethnic composition

- White, not Hispanic: 77%
- White, Hispanic: 17%
- Asian/Pacific Islander: 4%
- Indian/Alaskan Native: less than 1%
- Black, not Hispanic: less than 1%

== Extracurricular activities ==
=== Athletics ===
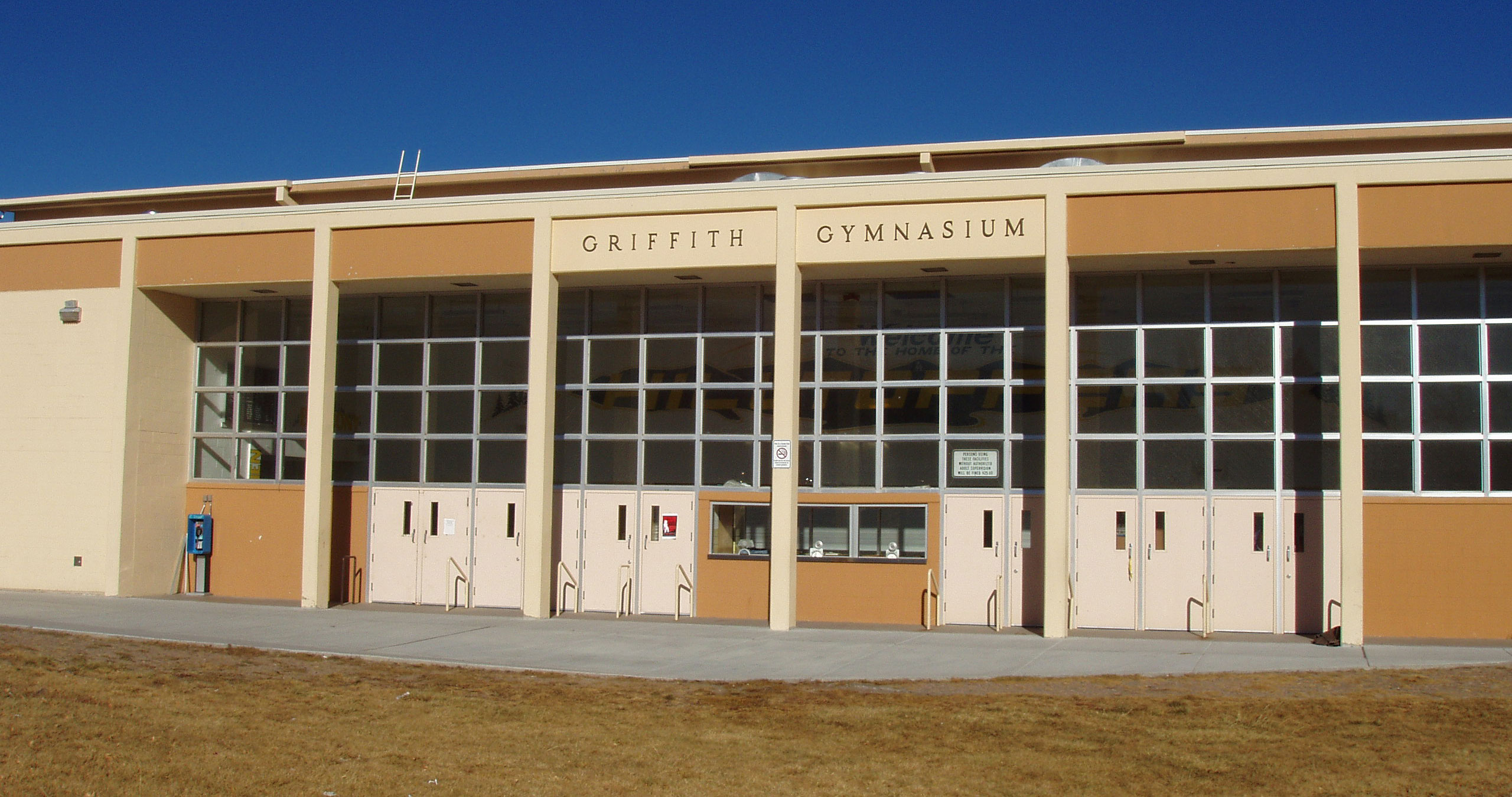
Griffith Gymnasium

Los Alamos High School competes in the New Mexico Activities Association District 2-AAAA. Since its transition from a AAA to a AAAA school in 2000–2001, the students of LAHS have won over 30 state titles in competitive high school sports. LAHS was honored with the AAAA Girls all-sports trophy in 2000–01, 2001–02, and 2003–04. In 2003–04, LAHS also received the New Mexico Athletic Director of the Year award.

Athletic classification / district alignment
LAHS athletic district	Years
2-A	1954–1967
1-AA	1968–1969
1-AAAA	1970–1992
2-AAA	1993–2000
2-AAAA	2001–2014
2-AAAAA football	2014–present
2-AAAA other sports	2018–present

==== Cross country ====
In 2007, the LAHS boys' cross country team (competing as the Los Alamos XC Club) placed second at the 2007 Nike Cross Nationals. The LAHS boys' cross country team also participated in the Nike Cross Nationals in the 2006 season. In 2002 the LAHS Girls Cross Country, won the AAAA State Championship with a perfect score of 15 (i.e. their runners finished in places 1–5). The LAHS Girls Cross Country Team participated in the inaugural Nike Cross Nationals championship in the 2004 season.

==== State championships ====
LAHS has won over 110 state championships in athletics, the third-most state titles won by any high school in New Mexico.

State championships
State championships
Season	Sport	Number of championships	Year
Fall	Football	1	1966
Fall	Boys' cross country	11	2003, 2007, 2011, 2012, 2013, 2014, 2018, 2019, 2021, 2022, 2023
Fall	Girls' cross country	25	1981, 1982, 1992, 1994, 1995, 1996, 1997, 2000, 2001, 2002, 2003, 2004, 2006, 2009, 2010, 2011, 2012, 2013, 2014, 2015, 2019, 2020, 2021, 2022, 2023
Fall	Boys' soccer	2	1986, 2010
Fall	Girls' soccer	6	1981, 1983, 1985, 1987, 1998, 2003
Fall	Volleyball	3	1987, 1995, 1996
Winter	Boys' basketball	2	1964, 2000
Winter	Girls' basketball	0	
Winter	Boys' swimming	18	1956, 1971, 1974, 1976, 1977, 1978, 1979, 1980, 1981, 1982, 1983, 1984, 1987, 1988, 1990, 1991, 2004, 2005
Winter	Girls' swimming	15	1970, 1972, 1976, 1977, 1978, 1979, 1980, 1981, 1982, 1984, 1985, 1988, 1992, 1993, 2004
Winter	Wrestling	0	
Spring	Baseball	2	1966, 1978
Spring	Cheerleading	0	
Spring	Boys' golf	6	1969, 1996, 2004, 2005, 2006, 2019
Spring	Girls' golf	3	1984, 2007, 2019
Spring	Softball	0	
Spring	Boys' track	6	1965, 1995, 2008, 2021, 2022, 2023
Spring	Girls' track	9	1995, 2003, 2009, 2010, 2011, 2012, 2021, 2022, 2023
Spring	Boys' tennis	0	
Spring	Girls' tennis	8	2000, 2001, 2002, 2003, 2004, 2007, 2008, 2013
Total		111 (ranked 3rd in state)	

=== Music ===
LAHS directs several musical groups, many of which are offered for academic credit. These groups include three bands (concert band, symphonic band, wind ensemble – the latter two bands march during the school's football season), one jazz band, three choirs (one women's, two co-ed – previously it was two women's, one men's, and one co-ed), and two orchestras (chamber and symphonic). The LAHS Topper Marching Band won first place in their category at the Tournament of Bands in 2006 and 2008, won Pageant of Bands in 2007 and 2008, won first place in their category at Zia Marching Band Fiesta in 2009, 2022, 2023, 2024, and 2025. The marching band took 3rd place at the inaugural NMAA state marching band contest in 2024, won first place in 2025, and placed first again in 2026 with awards for outstanding percussion, color guard, music, and general effect. The Concert Band has taken home state titles, most recently in 2008, 2009, and 2011, with a 2nd place finish in 2026. All four LAHS choirs received superior ratings at the District Large Group Festival in 2009. Schola Cantorum, the top choir at LAHS, won the state championship for choir in 2015. This was the first choir in the state to beat Piedra Vista High School's PVC Pipes, who had won the state championship every year since state competitions for choir began in New Mexico.

=== Other clubs and organizations ===
- Los Alamos High School has an active Science Bowl Club. The club won the New Mexico Regional competition in 2010, 2011, 2012, 2013, 2014, 2016, 2017, 2018, 2019, 2020, 2021, 2022, 2023, 2024, and 2026. Each of these years, the team progressed to the national competition in Washington D.C. In 2012, they became the first team from New Mexico to make it out of the national round robin round, finishing in a tie for 9th.
- LAHS literary magazine, Pegasus 2004, was "Recommended for Highest Award" in the 2004 NCTE Program to Recognize Excellence in Student Literary Magazines.
- In 2012 LAHS's NJROTC Unit was designated a "Distinguished Unit With Honors" for the ninth year in a row. This designation included academic honors, which are reserved for only a handful of units.
- The Hilltalkers, the competitive speech and debate team coached for many years by Paul Black, won numerous State Championships in Cross-Examination Debate, Extemporaneous Speaking and Original Oratory.
- The 1985 chess team tied for 2nd place in the US National Championships held in St. Louis.

== Team name and mascot ==
The Hilltopper, as once seen from Griffith Gymnasium

The team name, Hilltoppers, derives from a popular nickname for the city, "The Hill." Sometimes LAHS students are referred to with the abbreviation Toppers or 'Toppers.

The team colors of forest green and gold reference the autumnal display, on the mountains behind the town, of dark-green pine forest interspersed with bright yellow aspen.

The mascot of Los Alamos High School is the Hilltopper (Now more commonly known as "Topper Man"), chosen in a vote by the student body in the 1960s. (Previously, the school teams were iconified by a top-hat and gloves.) In 1980, a mural of the Hilltopper was painted in Griffith Gymnasium. In this mural the Hilltopper was prominently depicted as a rugged mountain man with a walking stick atop the scenic Jemez Mountains that overlook LAHS. In 2004, the mural was destroyed during renovations to the gymnasium's HVAC system when a series of fans were installed on the gym's interior south wall.

== Facilities ==
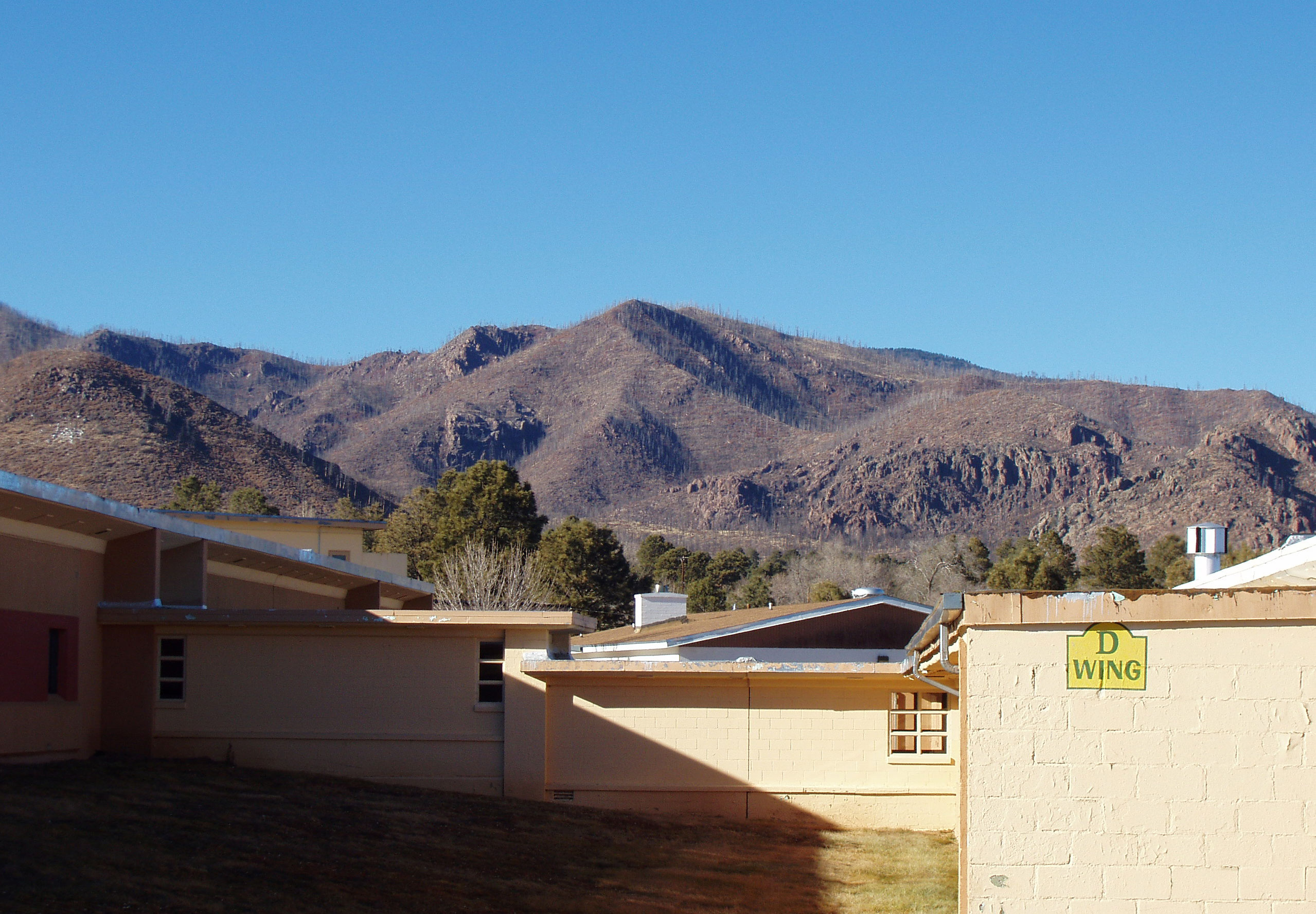
Los Alamos High School sits below the Jemez Mountains, as seen before the three-story building replaced A-D wings

In 2010, construction began on the high school to replace aging buildings at the center of the campus. A-D wings were torn down to make room for a new three-story building, designed by FBT Architects of Albuquerque. The new main building was completed in late 2011, with classes beginning in January 2012. This is the most recent in a series of capital renovations at the high school, including the addition of a new science wing and the newly remodeled R-Wing (formerly the cafeteria).

In 2010, Los Alamos Public Schools were commended by Energy Education for their efforts in promoting energy efficiency. LA Schools achieved over a million dollars in energy cost savings during a 56-month period.

== Notable alumni ==
- Walt Arnold (class of 1976), NFL tight end
- Jennifer Attrep (class of 1996), chief judge of the New Mexico Court of Appeals
- Lynn Bjorklund (class of 1975), National High School record 3000 meters, USA National Cross Country Champion in 1974 and 1975
- Patrick M. Brenner (class of 2010), non-profit executive and political commentator
- Carol Cady (class of 1980), two-time competitor in the Olympic games: shot put in 1984, discus in 1988; held US women's discus record for 21 years
- Clayborne Carson (class of 1962), civil rights activist and professor of history at Stanford University
- Susann Cokal (class of 1982), novelist
- Deborah Fritz (class of 1988), curator and art dealer
- Drew Goddard (class of 1993), screenwriter and co-executive producer of Lost
- Kolinda Grabar-Kitarović (class of 1986), 4th president of the Republic of Croatia
- Chase Jackson (class of 2012), 2019 indoor and outdoor, 2020 indoor national champion in women's shot put; qualifier for the World Athletics Championships
- Kevin Johnson (class of 1978), businessman and software engineer; former president and CEO of Starbucks
- Alex Kirk (class of 2010), professional basketball player for the Canton Charge
- Paul Maley (class of 1984), former professional basketball player
- Katherine Maraman (class of 1969), chief justice of the Supreme Court of Guam
- Kim Paffenroth (class of 1984), author, winner of the Bram Stoker Award for horror writing
- Steven Preeg (class of 1989), 81st Academy Award for Best Visual Effects for The Curious Case of Benjamin Button
- Harriet Ruiz (class of 1959), member of the New Mexico House of Representatives 2004–2006
- Andy Thoma (class of 2011), professional soccer player for the Portland Timbers
- Terry C. Wallace Jr. (class of 1974), 11th director of Los Alamos National Laboratory; current president of Los Alamos National Security, LLC
- Alexandr Wang (class of 2014), founder and CEO of Scale AI; chief AI officer of Meta Platforms
- Jada Yuan (class of 1996), journalist and author
