= Nicole Lloyd-Ronning =

American astrophysicist

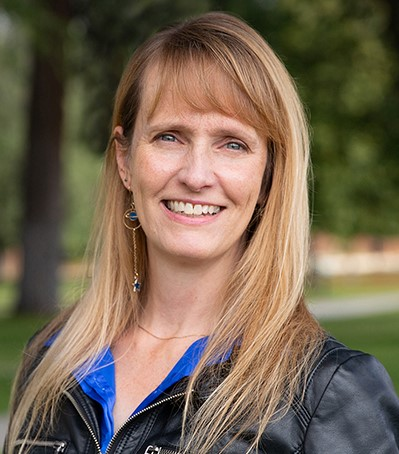
Lloyd-Ronning in 2022

Nicole Marie Lloyd-Ronning is an American computational astrophysicist specializing in gamma-ray bursts and the deaths of massive stars as a researcher at the Los Alamos National Laboratory and lecturer at University of New Mexico–Los Alamos. She is also known for her work in science popularization, as the author of the book Great Mysteries in Astrophysics, as a scientist ambassador for the Bradbury Science Museum, and in youth outreach programs, especially for young people from indigenous groups in the American southwest.

== Education and career ==
Lloyd-Ronning was born in El Paso, Texas and grew up as an army brat in the US and Germany. When she was a high school student in Honolulu, Hawaii, she discovered her interest in science and mathematics. She majored in physics and astronomy at Cornell University, graduating in 1996, and completed a doctorate at Stanford University. Her 2001 doctoral dissertation, Cosmological and Intrinsic Properties of Gamma-Ray Bursts, was supervised by Vahé Petrosian.. As part of her thesis, she provided a quantitative prediction of the relationship between gamma-ray burst isotropic energy and spectral peak energy, which was confirmed two years later through observations, termed the "Amati relation" by the lead author of the observational paper. She also showed that the prompt gamma-ray burst emission was well-described by detailed, exact models of synchrotron radiation.

During postdoctoral research at the Canadian Institute for Theoretical Astrophysics, she began working from home and part time after the birth of her first child. She became a postdoctoral researcher at the Los Alamos National Laboratory in 2004, but the pressure of balancing her work with raising a family led her to drop out of academia and research for ten years, although she maintained her currency with ongoing research, her connections with a small number of researchers, and her memberships in the academic societies for her discipline.

In 2015, she won an M. Hildred Blewett Fellowship, an award given by the American Physical Society to support women returning to interrupted careers in science. With the support of the fellowship, she became a lecturer at the University of New Mexico–Los Alamos and a scientist in the Computational Physics and Methods group at the Los Alamos National Laboratory, initially as a subcontracter and in 2021 as a permanent staff member.

== Outreach ==
Lloyd-Ronning's interest in science outreach began in her graduate school years, as a Project Astro participant in the Bay Area. During her career break, she frequently visited schools in Northern New Mexico to run a series of hands-on physics and astronomy activities with K-12 students. In 2018, she began a collaboration with artist Agnes Chavez through a series of local and worldwide workshops focused on connections between physics, indigenous cosmology, and indigenous art. She has taught through Chavez's STEMArts Lab, which brings science programming to schools and festivals, and is one of the scientist ambassadors at the Los Alamos National Laboratory Bradbury Science Museum.

She is the author of Great Mysteries in Astrophysics: A Guide to What We Don't Know (IOP Publishing, 2022), based on a community education course she taught for several years at the University of New Mexico–Los Alamos.

== Recognition ==
In 2019, Los Alamos National Laboratory awarded Lloyd-Ronning the Distinguished Mentor Award, and in 2020 the University of New Mexico, Los Alamos awarded Lloyd-Ronning their Faculty Initiative Award.

In 2021, the Los Alamos National Laboratory gave Lloyd-Ronning their inaugural Los Alamos Community Relations Medal, for her efforts in bringing STEM education to underserved and indigenous students in New Mexico.

In 2022, Lloyd-Ronning was named a Fellow of the American Physical Society (APS).
