= Deborah Fritz =

American curator, gallerist, and art dealer

- Education: University of New Mexico
- Occupation: art dealer
- Known for: Curating, art dealership
- Partner: Kimberly Giacobbe

Deborah Fritz is an American curator, gallerist, and art dealer. Fritz is the owner of Giacobbe-Fritz Fine Art and the GF Contemporary, both located on Canyon Road, Santa Fe, New Mexico. She most recently opened galleryFRITZ in the Santa Fe Railyard Arts District, which has since closed.

== Background ==
Fritz grew up in Los Alamos, New Mexico and graduated from Los Alamos High School in 1988. She earned an art history degree from the University of New Mexico in Albuquerque.

== Career ==
She opened Giacobbe-Fritz Fine Art in 2001 with her sister and business partner, Kimberly Giacobbe. In 2009, Fritz opened GF Contemporary, on the opposite side of Canyon Road. Her galleries participate in the annual ARTFeast, an edible art tour and fundraiser. Fritz has served on ARTFeast's board and collaborated on projects with SITE Santa Fe.

Fritz has been active in the Santa Fe art world, joining the Museum of New Mexico Foundation Business Council in 2007 and serving as vice president of the Santa Fe Art Gallery Association.

Through her galleries, Fritz has cultivated an international clientele, including art collectors from Belgium, Brazil, and Mexico. She showcases sculpture, paintings, prints, digital art, and other media. Giacobbe-Fritz Fine Art represents traditional, often figurative fine art—such as artwork by realist oil painter Wendy Chidester. Meanwhile, GF Contemporary represents work by more experimental artists. "I've always loved nonrepresentational art," says Fritz.
