= Marsella Duarte =

American politician

Member of the New Mexico House of Representatives from the 16th district
- In office December 14, 2022 – January 9, 2023
- Preceded by: Moe Maestas
- Succeeded by: Yanira Gurrola

Personal details
- Party: Democratic

Marsella Duarte is an American politician and educator who served as a member of the New Mexico House of Representatives for the 16th district from 2022 to 2023. She was appointed to the position on December 14, 2022, succeeding Moe Maestas.

== Career ==
Since November 2021, Duarte has worked as a kindergarten teacher in the Albuquerque Public Schools. She was previously a legal assistant and worked Maggie Toulouse Oliver's 2020 campaign for the United States Senate. On December 14, 2022, the Bernalillo County Commission selected Duarte to fill the remainder of Moe Maestas's House term.
