= Paul Maley =

American and Australian basketball player (born 1966)

Personal information
- Born: July 28, 1966 (age 60) Los Alamos, New Mexico, U.S.
- Listed height: 6 ft 7 in (2.01 m)

Career information
- High school: Los Alamos (Los Alamos, New Mexico)
- College: Yale (1984–1988)
- Playing career: 1988–2001
- Position: Forward

Career history
- 1988–1989: Dungannon
- 1990: Westside Melbourne Saints
- 1991–1998: North Melbourne Giants
- 1998–1999: Victoria Titans
- 1999–2001: Adelaide 36ers

Career highlights
- NBL champion (1994); Ivy League Player of the Year (1988); First-team All-Ivy League (1988)

Paul Maley (born July 28, 1966) is an American and Australian former basketball player. He played college basketball for Yale where he was the Ivy League Player of the Year in 1988. Following his college career, he played professionally in Ireland and Australia. Nicknamed The Mailman, he won the NBL championship with the North Melbourne Giants in 1994.

== Early life ==
Maley attended Los Alamos High School in Los Alamos, New Mexico.

== College career ==
After missing most of his freshman season with ankle injuries, Maley was a three-year starter the rest of his college career. He finished 11th on Yale's all-time scoring list with 1,177 points. During his senior year, he averaged 20.2 points and 8.1 rebounds per game and was named First-team All-Ivy League and the Ivy League Player of the Year, becoming the first Yale player to win the award.

== Professional career ==
Maley started his professional career with Dungannon in Ireland during the 1988–1989 season. He attended training camp with the New Jersey Nets prior to the 1989–1990 season but was cut before the start of the regular season. He later played in the Australian National Basketball League from 1990 to 2001, winning the NBL championship in 1994.

== Personal life ==
Maley's daughter with former basketball player Karianne Maley is Australian basketball player Anneli Maley. His father attended Yale and was a member of the Yale Crew team. He is the father of current Adelaide Crows player Finnbar Maley.

In 2023, Maley was diagnosed with breast cancer. Of the 21,000 Australians who are diagnosed with breast cancer each year, about one per cent are men. He subsequently underwent a test to see if the cancer was genetic; that test came back negative.
