= Los Alamos Public Schools =

School district in New Mexico, United States

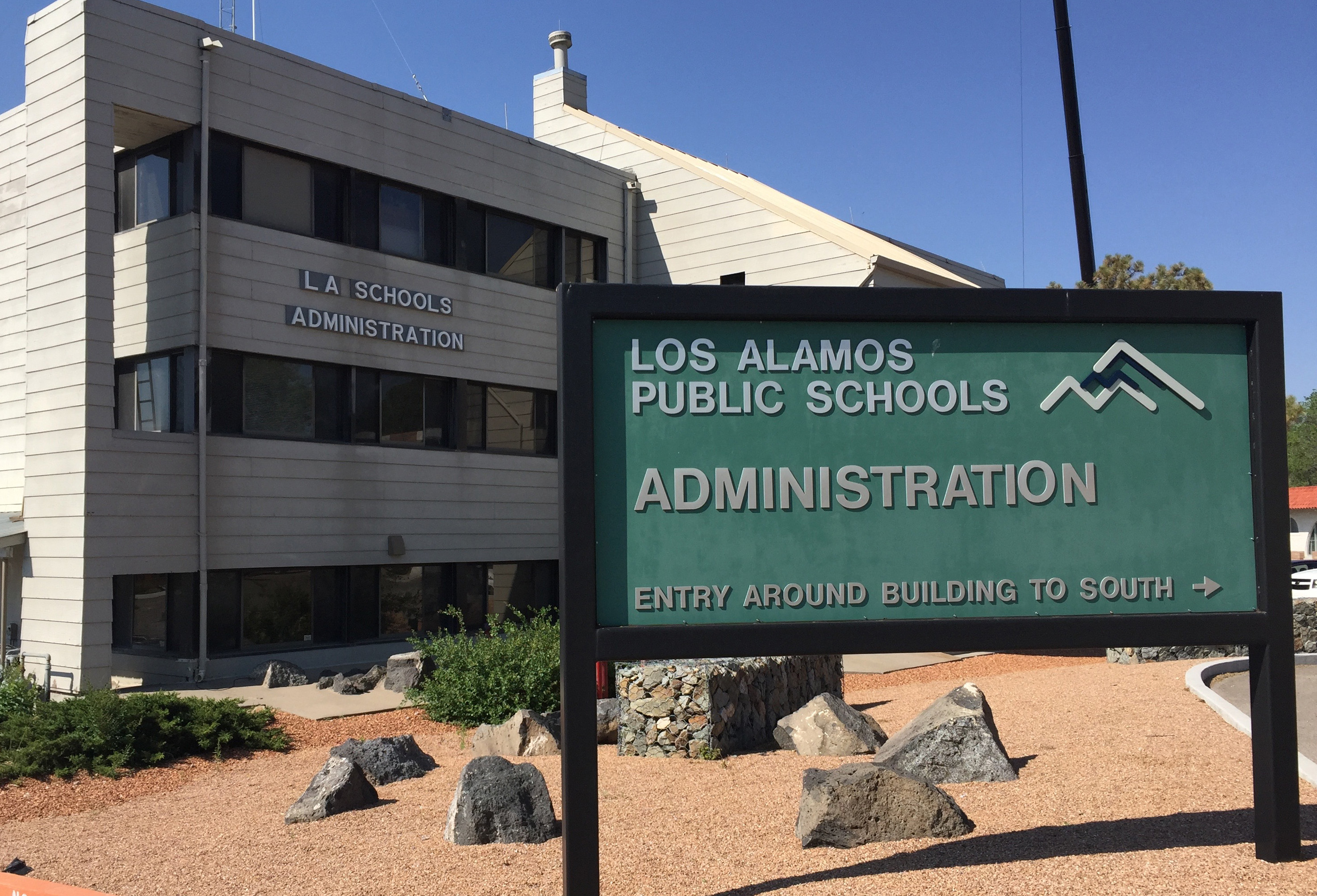
- Los Alamos Public Schools Administrative Offices.

Location
- Los Alamos, New Mexico Northern New Mexico; Los Alamos County United States

District information
- Type: public
- Motto: We prepare confident, life-long learners.
- Grades: K-12
- Established: 1943
- Superintendent: Dr. Jennifer Guy

Students and staff
- Students: 3,626

Other information
- Website: laschools.net

Los Alamos Public Schools is a school district based in Los Alamos, NM, USA. Los Alamos Public Schools serves all of Los Alamos County, including the communities of Los Alamos and White Rock. The district also has a portion in Sandoval County.

The school district has a total of seven schools, five in Los Alamos, two in White Rock. The district has five elementary schools, one middle school, and one high school.

== Schools ==
=== High schools ===
- Topper Freshman Academy
- Los Alamos High School

=== Middle schools ===
Los Alamos Middle School
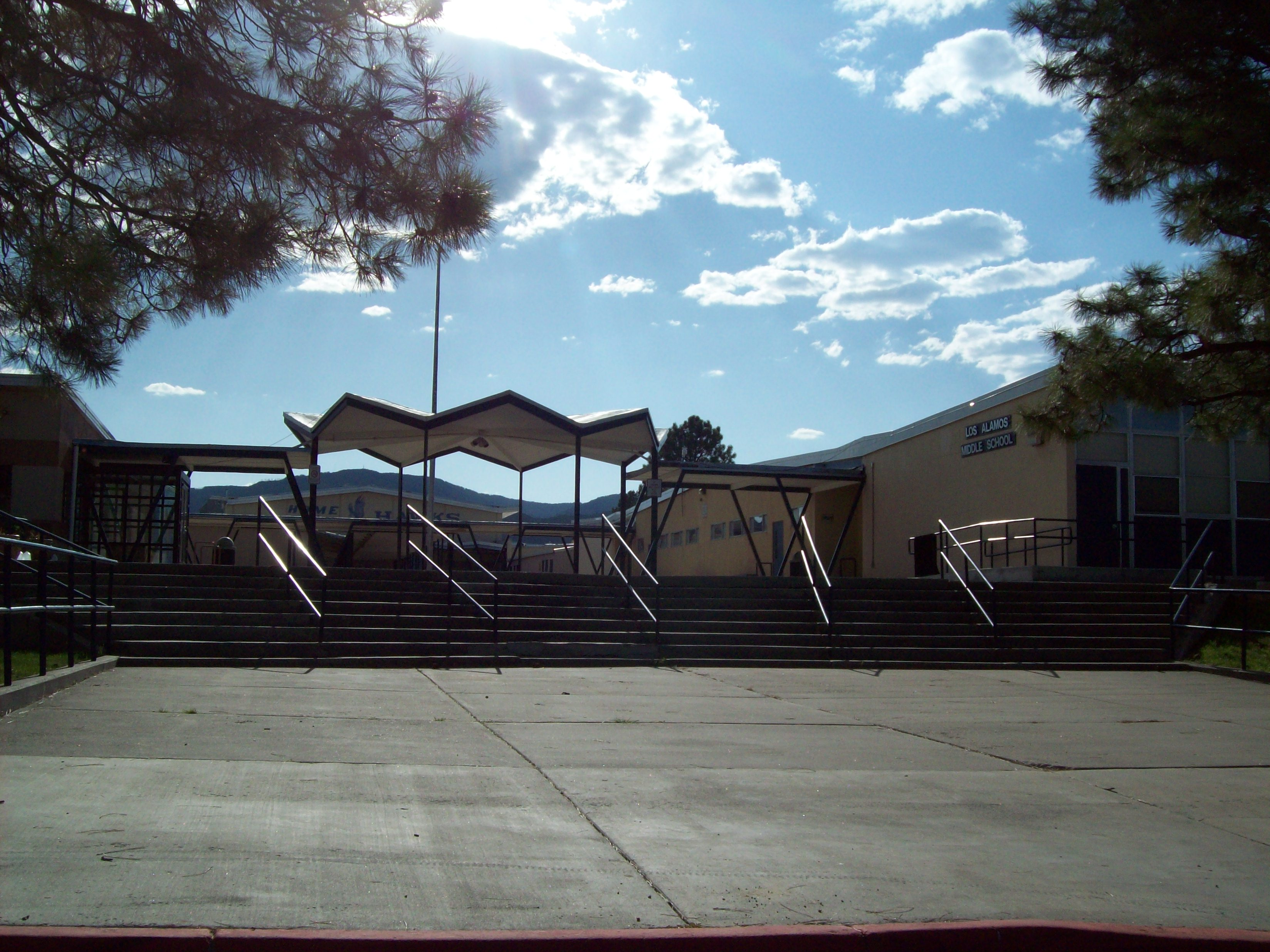

Location
- 2101 Hawk Drive; Los Alamos, New Mexico 87544; United States

Information
- School type: Public, Middle School
- Motto: "Healthy Atmosphere Where Kids Succeed"
- Founded: 1984 (was Cumbres Jr. High School from 1962-1984)
- School district: Los Alamos Public Schools
- Principal: Jill Gonzalez
- Enrollment: 594 (2008)
  - Grade 7: 294
  - Grade 8: 300
- Average class size: 16
- Colors: Blue, and Silver
- Team name: Hawks
- Website: lams.laschools.net

Los Alamos Middle School is the only middle school for the Los Alamos Public School District.

The school was originally founded as Cumbres Junior High School in 1962, the town's second junior high school after (the now defunct) Pueblo Junior High School. When district enrollment declined heavily in 1984 the school board decided to close a junior high to save money. The district chose to keep the newer school, Cumbres, open and closed Pueblo in the summer of that year. The school district wanted to make a clean break from the past and named the amalgamated school simply "Los Alamos Middle School". To address the difficulty of merging the former rival sports teams, the Pueblo Braves and the Cumbres Cougars, the school held an election for a new name, choosing "Hawks".

==== Facilities ====
In 2012, construction began on the middle school to replace aging buildings. The original 100 and 500 wings, which held eighth grade and seventh grade classes respectively, were torn down to make way for a new two-story building. The new building was completed in the summer of 2013 and opened in time for the 2013–2014 academic year.

=== Elementary schools ===
- Aspen Elementary School
- Barranca Mesa Elementary School
- Chamisa Elementary School
- Mountain Elementary School
- Pinon Elementary School
