= Ivanhoe, Victoria =

Ivanhoe
- Suburb
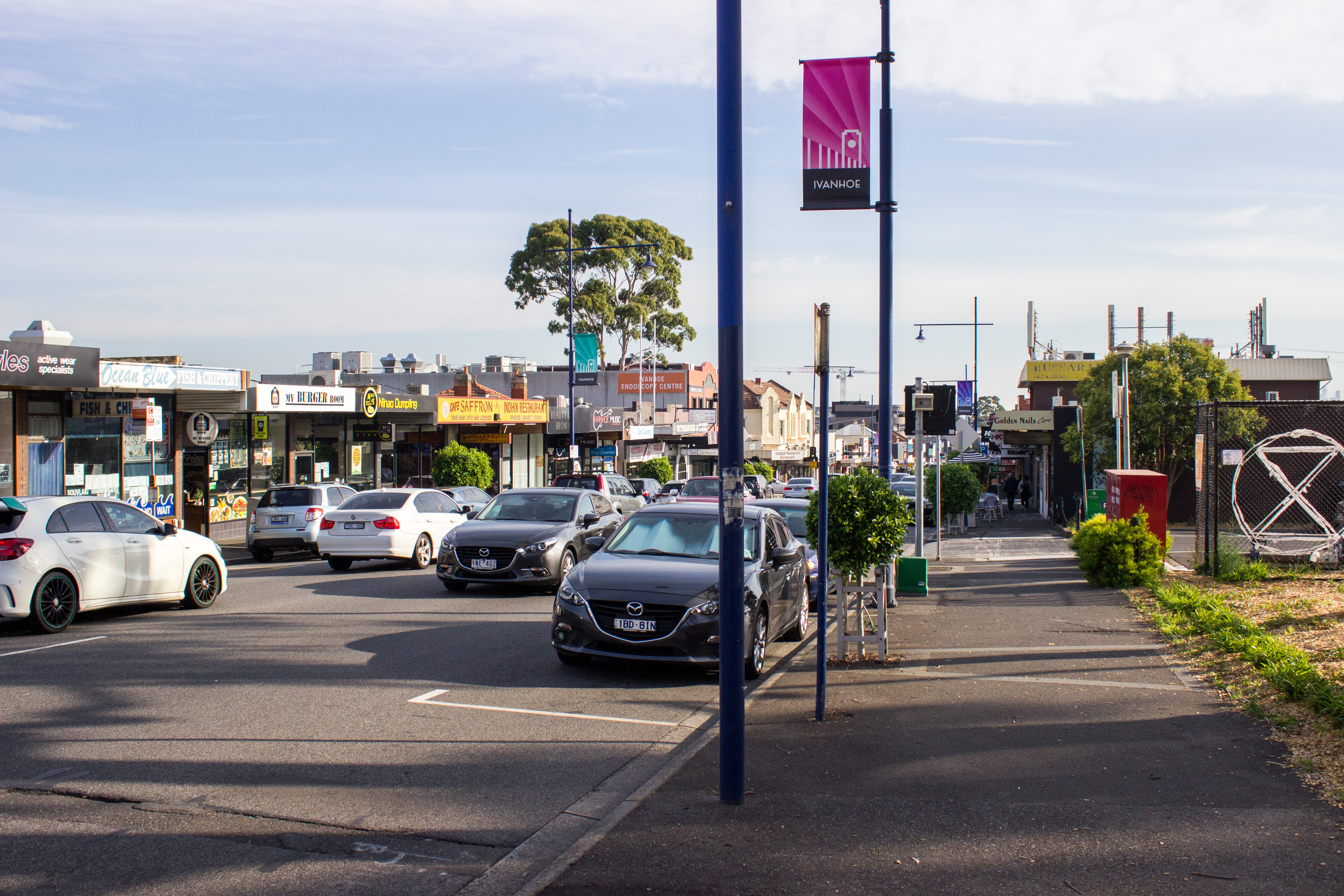
- Upper Heidelberg Road, Ivanhoe

- Interactive map of Ivanhoe
- Coordinates: 37.7703°S 145.0457°E
- Country: Australia
- State: Victoria
- City: Melbourne
- LGA: City of Banyule
- Location: 9 km (5.6 mi) from Melbourne

Government
  - State electorate: Ivanhoe
  - Federal division: Jagajaga

Area
  - Total: 5.1 km^{2} (2.0 sq mi)
- Elevation: 55 m (180 ft)

Population
  - Total: 13,374 (2021 census)
  - Density: 2,622/km^{2} (6,790/sq mi)
- Postcode: 3079
Suburbs around Ivanhoe
| Preston | Bellfield | Heidelberg |
| Thornbury | Ivanhoe | Eaglemont |
| Alphington | Kew East | Ivanhoe East |

Ivanhoe is a suburb of Melbourne, Victoria, Australia, 9 kilometres (5.6 mi) north-east of Melbourne's central business district, located within the City of Banyule local government area. Ivanhoe recorded a population of 13,374 at the 2021 census.

== History ==
Greenway's Ivanhoe Hotel was opened near current day Upper Heidelberg Road in 1854.

The homestead "Chelsworth" was built in 1860 and was an early farming property. The origins of the property are traced to 1846 when Patrick Stevenson operated a local dairy farm. The house now forms part of the Ivanhoe golf course.

Ivanhoe Post Office opened on 1 September 1874. Ivanhoe North Post Office, on Waterdale Road near Banksia Street, opened on 17 May 1926. An Ivanhoe West Post Office was open from 1955 until 1988.

Many streets in the area derive their names from characters in the Sir Walter Scott novel Ivanhoe.

The main station building of Ivanhoe train station was built in 1888.

In 1913, the property "Clarivue" was built, described as "the grandest of the early-medieval domestic revival houses in Heidelberg". In c. 1962, it became the home of the Ivanhoe RSL sub-branch; however, in April 2017 a major fire took hold of the building. As of March 2022, the heritage-listed Queen Anne-style building located in Studley Road remained untouched, without repair or restoration.

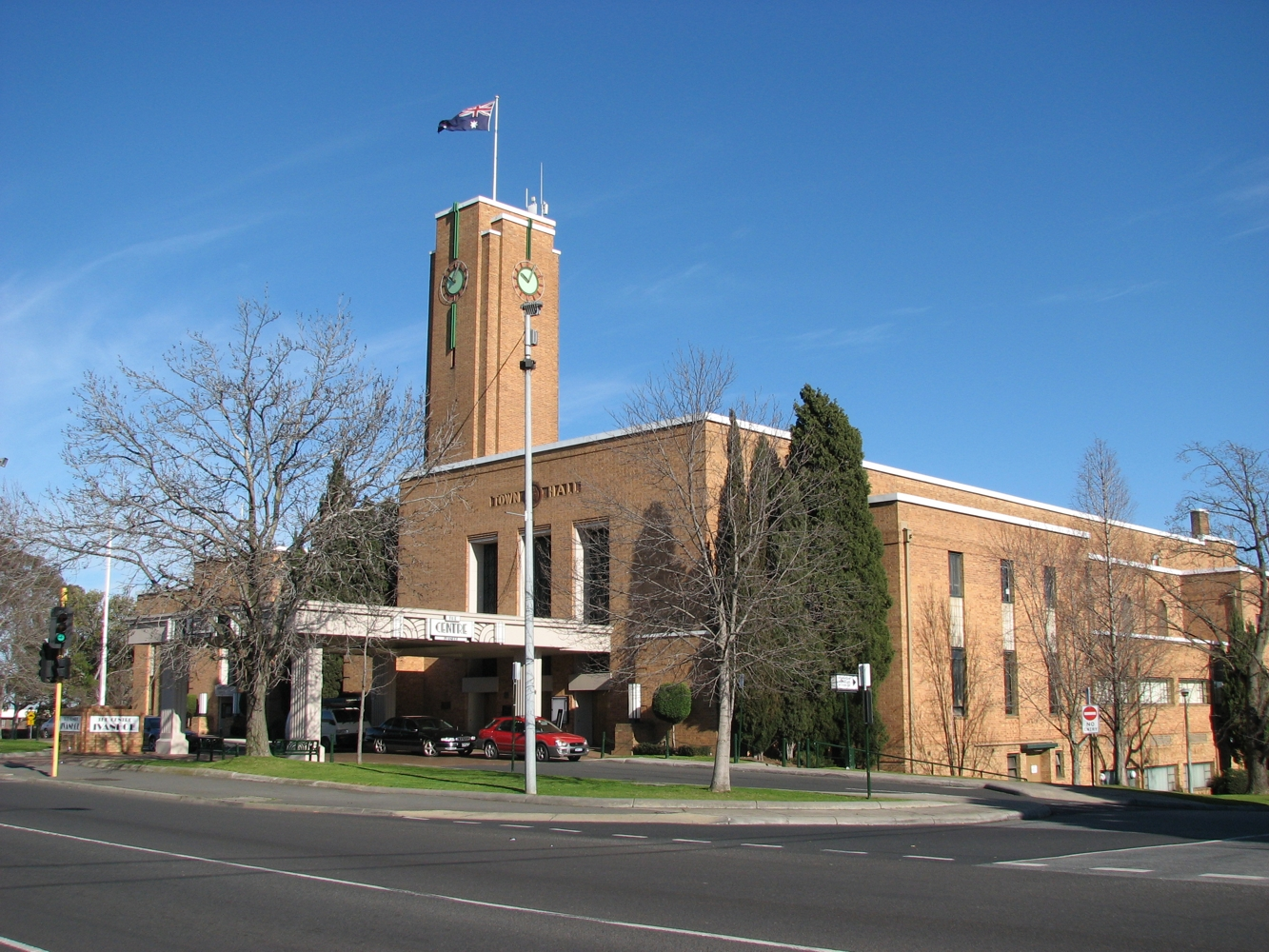
The Heidelberg Town Hall, built in 1937

Built on top of a hill in 1937, the former Heidelberg Town Hall, now known as The Centre Ivanhoe, completed in the Streamline Moderne style, was noted at the time to be "one of the most noteworthy contributions made to suburban architecture in some years". When built, the building featured deeply recessed windows and doorways, a clock tower, main hall with seating accommodation for 1,000 people, laid with parquetry wood blocks, carpeted lounges, a full-size concert platform with dressing rooms, concealed lighting, a supper room, a large foyer, cloak rooms and a meeting-room or third hall behind the main hall. There was also a kitchen. Steps lead up to the municipal offices and council chamber for the Heidelberg City Council. Within the town hall complex, the Heidelberg Children's Free Library opened the following year. In the same precinct, the Ivanhoe library opened on 8 October 1965, was subsequently demolished, and, in 2021 replaced on the same site as the Ivanhoe Library and Cultural Hub.

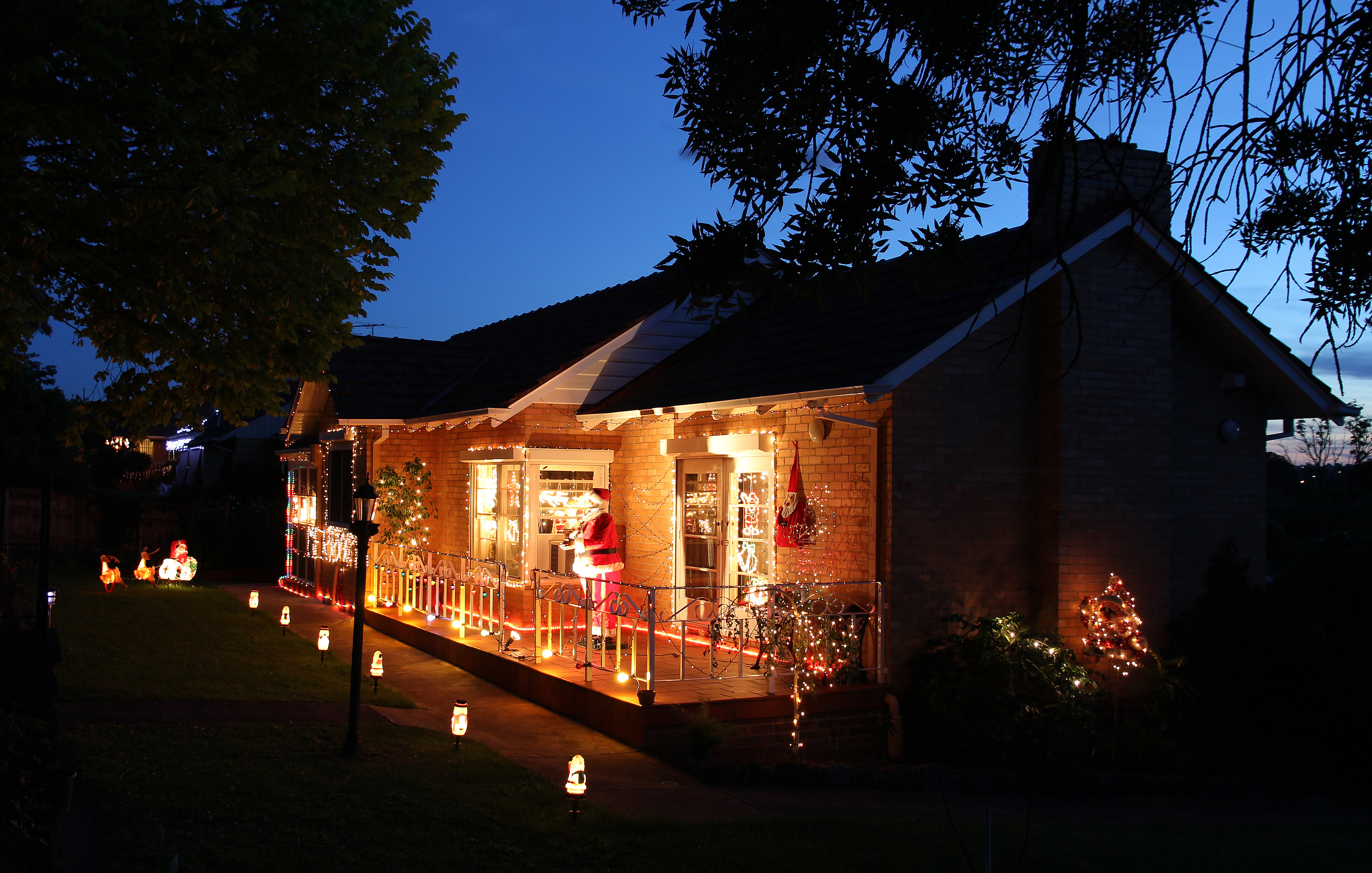
The Boulevard Christmas Lights.

Since the mid-1960s, the annual Boulevard Christmas lights event has taken place where dozens of houses in The Boulevard are decorated for Christmas. It began as a community event for local residents. Banyule City Council became involved in later years.

=== Heritage listings ===
The following places in Ivanhoe are listed on the Victorian Heritage Register:

- Charterisville, 77–79 Burke Road
- Heidelberg Town Hall, 275 Upper Heidelberg Road
- Macgeorge house, 25 Riverside Drive
- Waller house and collection, 9–9A Crown Road, managed by the Victorian branch of the National Trust

== Population ==
In the 2016 Census, there were 12,171 people in Ivanhoe. 69.2% of people were born in Australia. The next most common countries of birth were China 3.6%, England 2.6%, India 2.2%, Italy 2.1% and New Zealand 1.3%. 71.0% of people spoke only English at home. Other languages spoken at home included Mandarin 4.4%, Greek 3.6%, Italian 3.5%, Cantonese 1.5% and Spanish 0.9%. The most common responses for religion were No Religion 38.2% and Catholic 26.5%.

== Geography ==
The Yarra River forms the southern boundary of the suburb, with a golf course and a narrow riparian strip reserve. Darebin Creek runs along the western boundary of the suburb.

== Facilities ==
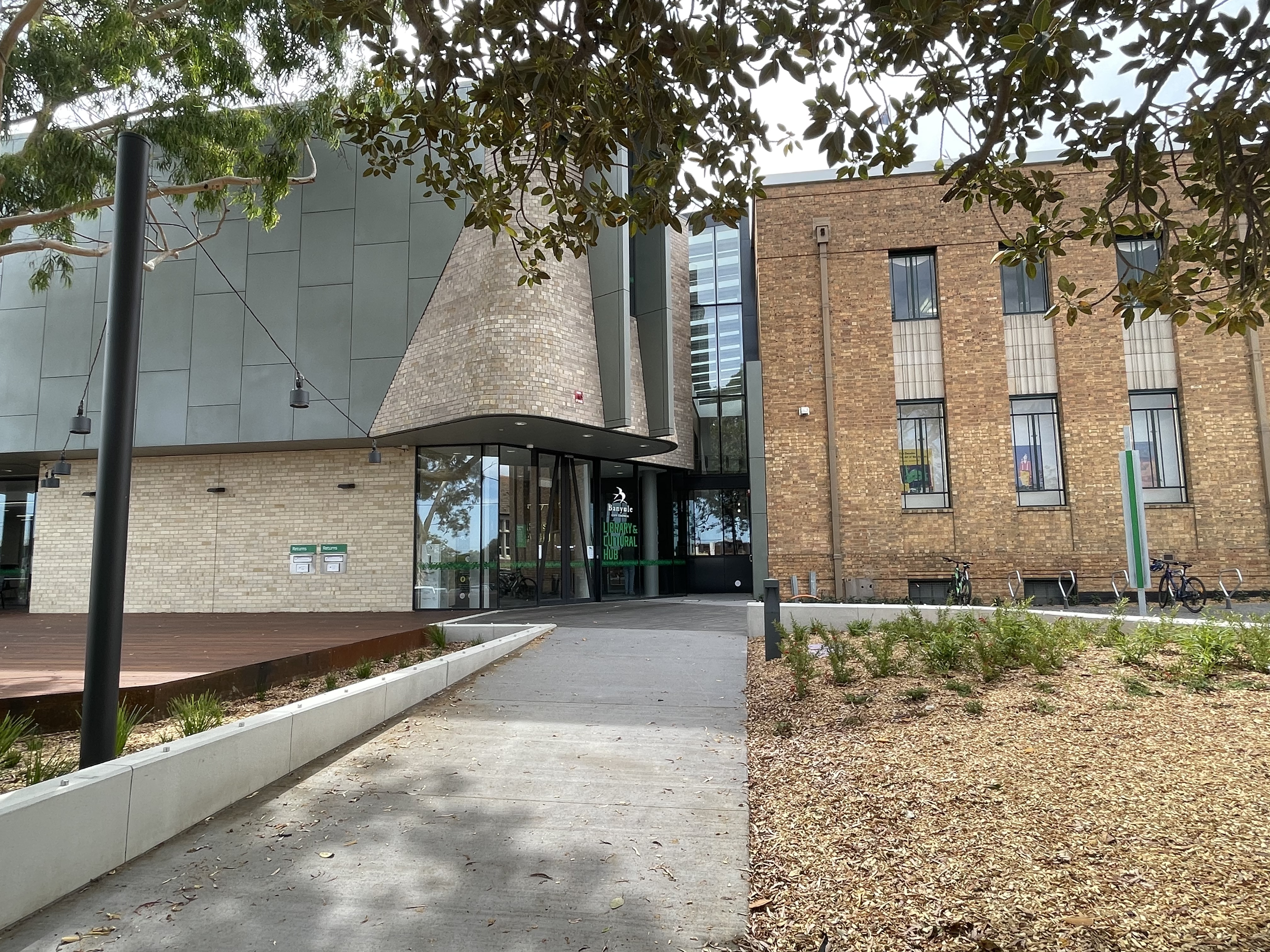
Ivanhoe Library & Cultural Hub

The Ivanhoe shopping centre strip along Upper Heidelberg road is of local historical and social significance. Some buildings were built in the 19th century, and most are from the Inter-war period, from 1915 to 1940.

The Ivanhoe Library & Cultural Hub was completed in February 2021. The state-of-the-art building included a modern accessible library, an art gallery, conference and meeting spaces, maternal and child health consulting suits, an informal theatrette, and a cafe. It has also incorporated a major redevelopment of the existing heritage-listed town hall; at a cost of A$31 million. Banyule U3A use it as one of its venues. Ivanhoe Library is managed by Yarra Plenty Regional Library.

The Centre Ivanhoe – part of the former Heidelberg Town Hall – is an events venue. The Hatch Contemporary Arts Space was managed by Banyule City Council and closed in early 2021. The Ivanhoe Reading Circle is Melbourne's longest-running bookclub.

== Transport ==
The suburb has two railway stations: Ivanhoe, which is located in the Zone 1 and 2 overlap of the public transport system, and Darebin, wholly within Zone 1, is also located in the suburb.

== Education ==
The suburb has two private schools; Ivanhoe Grammar School, established in 1915 and Ivanhoe Girls' Grammar School. It is also home to one of Victoria's oldest state schools, Ivanhoe Primary School, established in 1853. The Victorian State Government, through the Department of Education, closed Bellfield Primary School at 229 Banksia Street, Ivanhoe and sold the site to Banyule City Council in August 2013. The housing development by Stockland was built on the site.

== Sporting clubs ==
- Ivanhoe City Soccer Club est. 2015
- Ivanhoe Amateur Football Club since 1910
- Old Ivanhoe Grammarians Football Club est.1964
- Ivanhoe Knights Basketball Club
- Ivanhoe Junior Football Club
- Old Ivanhoe Grammarians Cricket Club
- West Ivanhoe United Cricket Club
- Ivanhoe Cricket Club
- Ivanhoe Harriers Athletics Club
- Ivanhoe Bowls Club est. 1912
- Ivanhoe Golf Course on Vasey Street.
- Ivanhoe Park Croquet Club was established in 1913.

== Notable people ==
- Sharin Anderson – musician, born in Ivanhoe
- Carrie Bickmore – Ivanhoe resident
- Cate Blanchett – actress who grew up in Ivanhoe
- Sam Bramham OAM – Australian Paralympic swimmer, Ivanhoe resident
- Brodie Grundy – Sydney Swans Australian rules footballer
- Peter Helliar – comedic television personality, Ivanhoe resident
- Carol Jerrems (1949–1980) – photographer, born and grew up in Ivanhoe
- The Nervo Twins
- Wilbur Wilde – saxophonist, comedic television personality and radio presenter; an Old Ivanhoe Grammarian

== See also ==
- City of Heidelberg – Ivanhoe was previously within this former local government area
