= Eltham High School =

Location
- Eltham, Victoria, 3095; Australia
- Coordinates: 37.7252°S 145.1418°E

Information
- Former name: Eltham Higher Elementary School
- School type: Government Public, day school
- Motto: Deeds Count
- Established: 1926
- Principal: Vincent Sicari
- Years offered: 7–12
- Enrolment: 1,403 (1 October 2024)
- Average class size: 25
- Hours in school day: 6
- Houses: Everard, Skipper, Toner, Pakana
- Colours: Blue, red and gold
- Sports: Volleyball
- Languages offered: Indonesian, French
- Website: https://www.elthamhs.vic.edu.au/

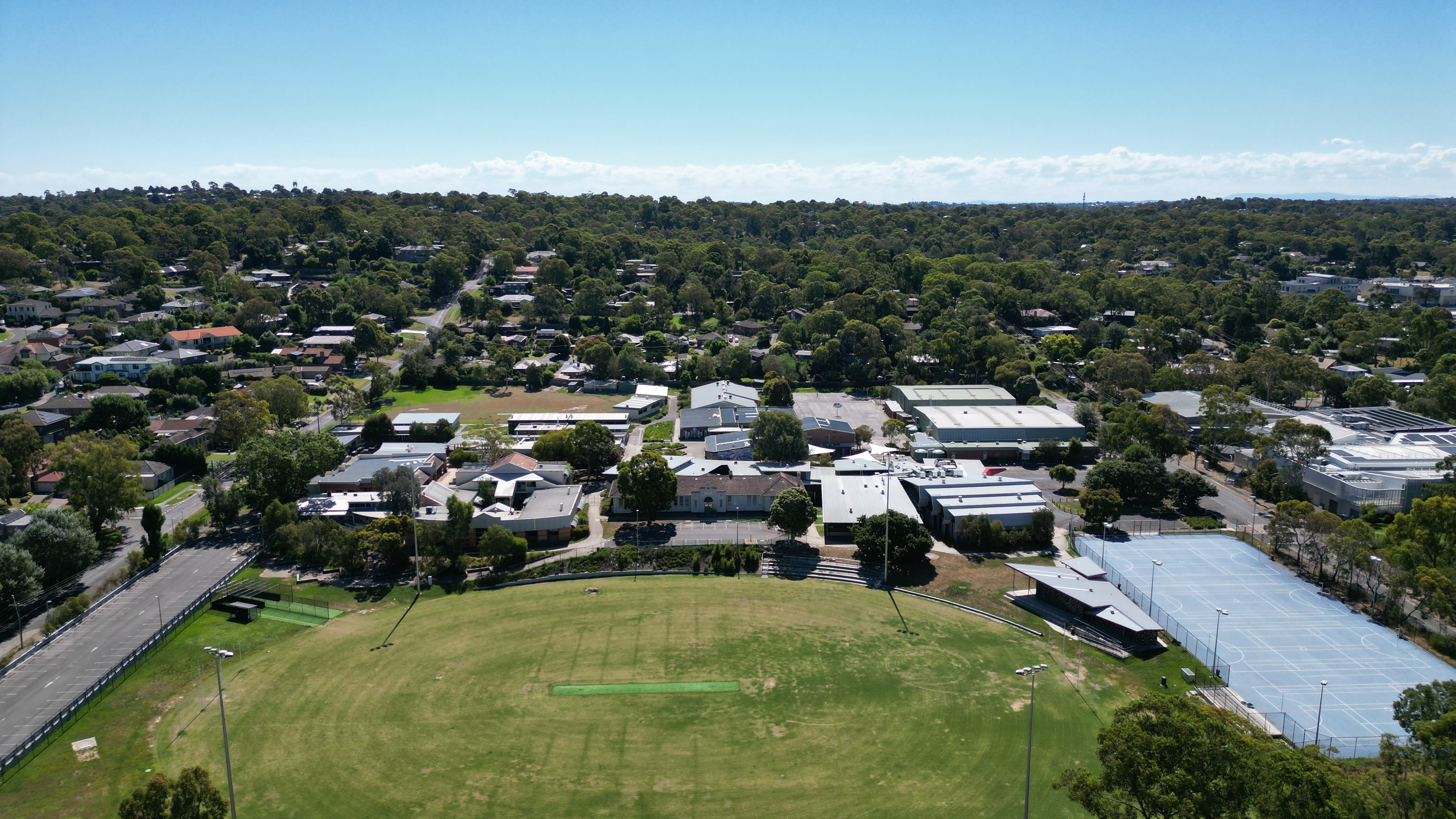
Eltham High School from above, facing west.

Eltham High School is a secondary school in Victoria, Australia. It is located in Eltham, a suburb which is north-east from Melbourne. The school has 'free dress' policy and is the only non-uniform secondary school in the Eltham area. Eltham High School has approximately 1,429 students, as of their 2023 Annual Report.

Eltham High School's music program, has won numerous awards. The band was invited to play at the Chicago Midwest Clinic in 1997 and is one of the only high school bands to ever have attended the event.

A darkroom is available for student use and is capable of developing over 160 photographs per hour.

== Year level structure ==
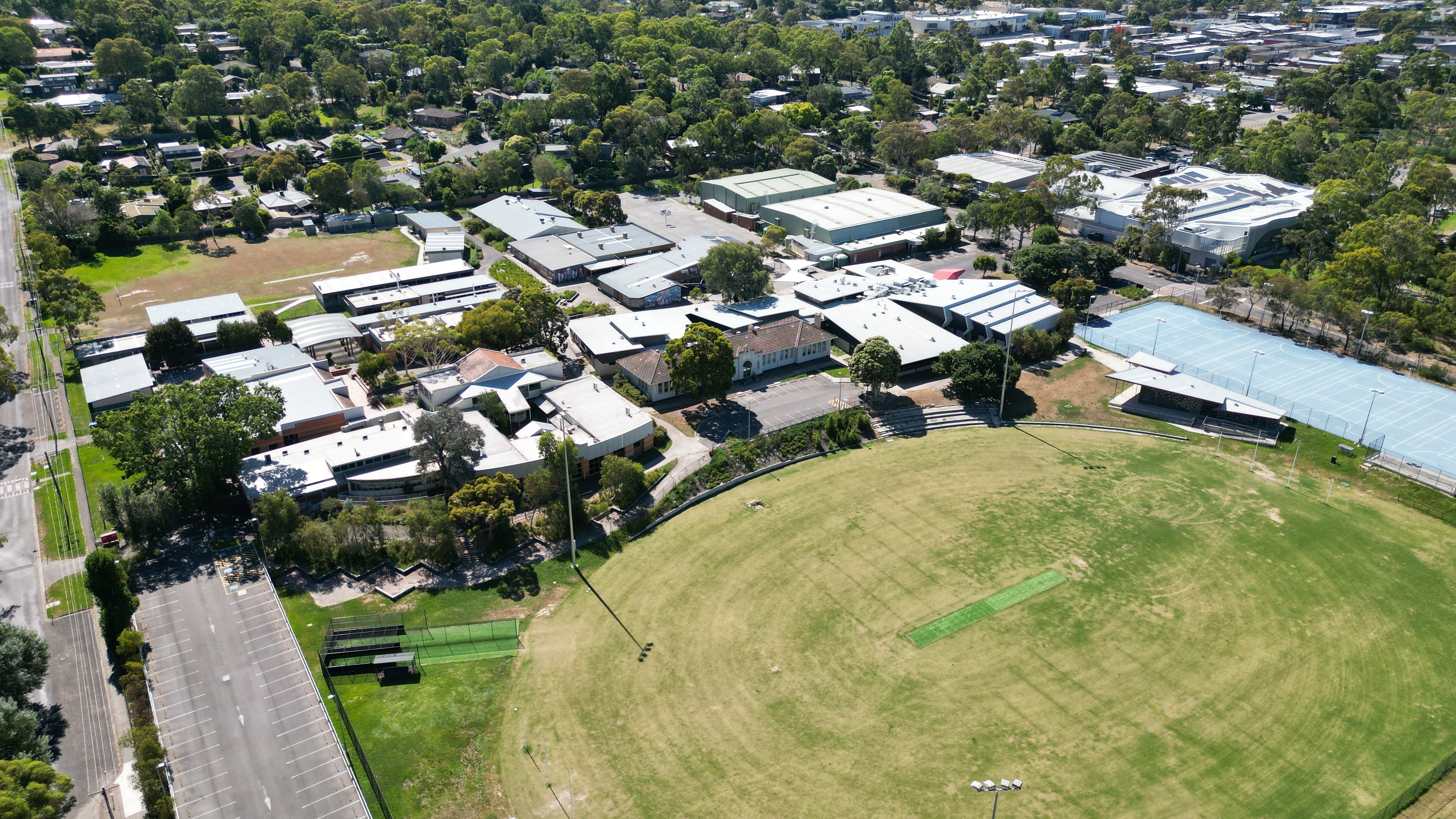
Eltham High School from above

The year levels are broken up into three different groups which are:

- Junior School (Transition and Year 7)
- Middle School (Years 8–9)
- Senior School (Years 10–12)

== Student laptop initiative ==
At the end of 2011, Eltham High School started rolling out the One to One Laptop Program initiated by the then Rudd Government for the start of the 2012 school year. This program involved the purchase of several hundred Dell Inspiron M102z laptops, either under funding from the Australian National Secondary School Computer Fund (NSSCF) to provide access for students in Years 9–12 or funded through a lease agreement for students in Years 7 and 8.

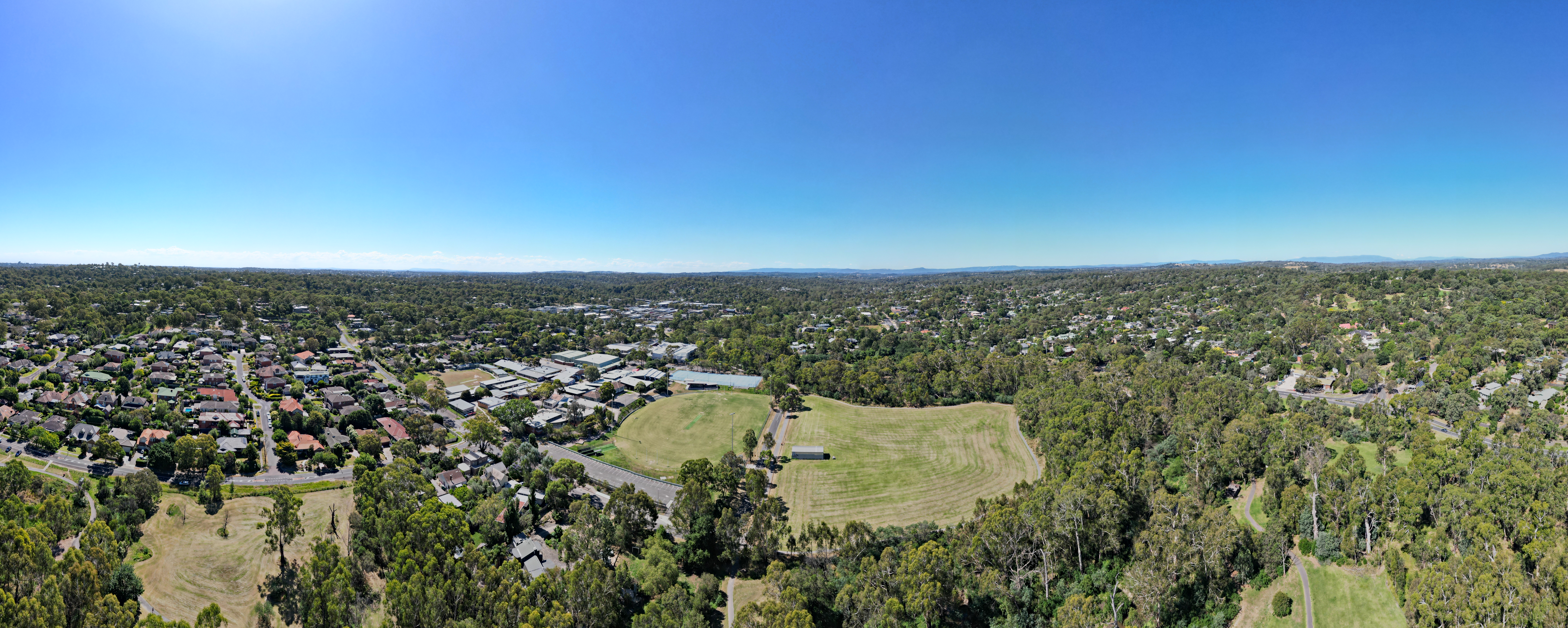
Eltham High School aerial panorama

This program has continued in 2013 with the roll out of more than 230 Dell XT3 tablet laptops to Year 7 students. All the notebooks in the program run a standard operating environment (SOE) provided by DEECD with a multitude of free and paid software. As of 2018, Eltham High School's chosen device was the Microsoft Surface Pro 4. The school also has licensing for a number of additional commercial software suites including Adobe Master Collection, which is available on all classroom and library computers and will be installed on select lease laptops dependent on student course enrolment.

Further changes to the school curriculum have been made since the implementation of the program. Since 2015 all Year 7 texts have been in digital format.

== Sport ==
The Eltham Stallions Senior Boys Football Team won the 2013 School Sports Victoria State championship, led by football coach Steven McCrystal and Peter Nicholson. Eltham High School also has an award-winning volleyball program that is currently led by Greg Thomas. The school recently won its 30th VSSSA pennant since 1996. The program has produced many outstanding volleyballers that have continued on to represent both Victoria and Australia at many championship competitions. Eltham High School is the most successful volleyball school in VSSSA history.

== Notable alumni ==
- Phillip Adams – broadcaster
- Sharin Anderson – musician
- Georgia Bonora – two time Australian Olympian and Commonwealth Games gold, silver and bronze medalist
- Peter Brock – racing car driver
- Emily Browning – actress
- Cadel Evans – cyclist
- Elyse Knowles – model
- Lloyd Mash – cricketer
- Ben Mendelsohn – actor
- Peter Moore – Australian rules footballer
- Daisy Pearce – Australian rules footballer
- James Clancy Phelan – author
- Tim Omaji – singer
- Jordan Richards – volleyball player
- Merrick Watts – broadcaster and comedian
- Gabby Seymour – Australian rules footballer
- Anneli Maley – Australian professional basketball
- Josh Weddle – Australian rules footballer
- Finnbar Maley – Australian rules footballer
