= Heidelberg Town Hall =

Heritage-listed town hall in Melbourne, Victoria, Australia

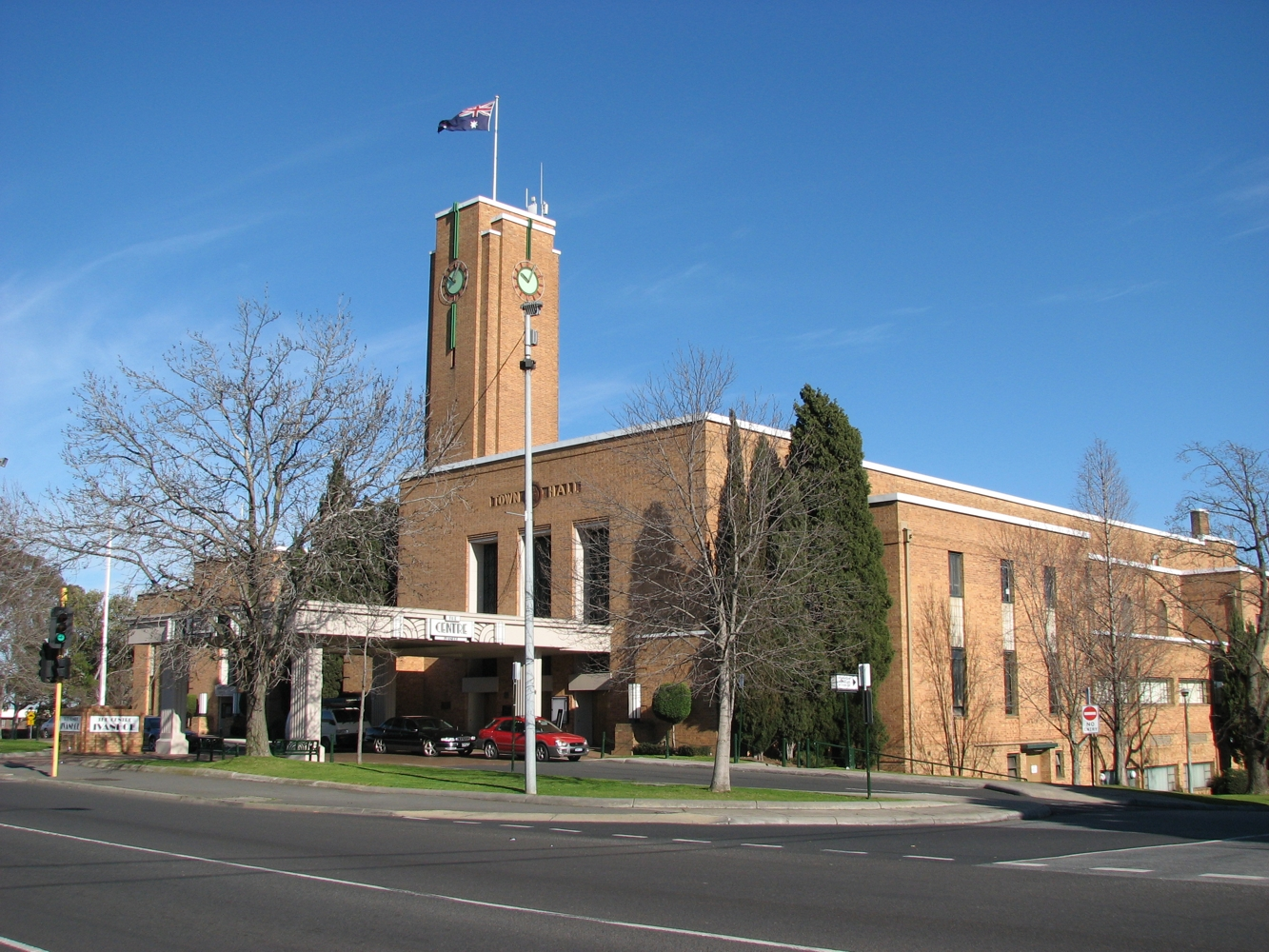
- The civic building in Ivanhoe, in 2006

- Location of the town hall in Greater Metropolitan Melbourne
- Interactive map of the Heidelberg Town Hall area
- Alternative names: The Centre Ivanhoe

General information
- Status: Completed
- Type: Town hall (former); Civic administration
- Architectural style: Streamline Moderne
- Location: 275 Upper Heidelberg Road, Ivanhoe, City of Banyule, Melbourne, Victoria, Australia
- Coordinates: 37°45′56″S 145°02′44″E
- Completed: 1937; 89 years ago
- Client: Heidelberg City Council (now Banyule City Council)

Height
- Tip: 28 m (92 ft) (clock tower)

Technical details
- Material: Bricks; steel; parquetry; timber; marble

Design and construction
- Architecture firm: Peck & Kemter; A.C. Leith & Bartlett
- Main contractor: G. S. Gay
- Awards: Street Architecture Medal (1939)

Website
- thecentreivanhoe.com.au

Victorian Heritage Register
- Official name: Heidelberg Town Hall
- Type: Registered place
- Designated: 29 December 2005
- Reference no.: H2077
- Heritage overlay no.: HO77
- Category: Community Facilities

Register of the National Estate
- Official name: Heidelberg Town Hall and Municipal Offices
- Type: Defunct register
- Designated: 30 June 1992
- Reference no.: 15279

The Heidelberg Town Hall, more commonly known as The Centre Ivanhoe, is a former town hall, now civic building, located at 275 Upper Heidelberg Road in Ivanhoe, in the City of Banyule, in the northern suburbs of Melbourne, in Victoria, Australia.

Built in 1937 on the traditional lands of the Wurundjeri people, the town hall was designed in the Streamline Moderne style for the Heidelberg City Council by architectural firm Peck & Kemter in association with A.C. Leith & Bartlett.

The building was added to the Victorian Heritage Register on 29 December 2005 in recognition of its architectural significance as "… the greatest and most eloquent expression of the Inter-war brick Moderne style in Victoria"; and was also added to non-statutory lists by the Victorian branch of the National Trust on 17 February 1983 and the now defunct Register of the National Estate on 30 June 1992.

== History ==
The former Shire of Heidelberg experienced rapid suburbanisation during the 1930s and the City of Heidelberg was proclaimed in 1934. The increased population and expanded range of municipal services and responsibilities determined the need for a large civic centre that could provide extensive office space for Council staff, as well as Council chambers, and a public hall. The town hall was officially opened by the Governor of Victoria, The Lord Huntingfield, in April 1937, three years after Heidelberg became a city.

=== The ’Berg ===
Not long after the town hall opened the council engaged Bill Glennon to organise public dances on Wednesday and Saturday nights. An 18-piece dance band played in the Great Hall, two smaller downstairs rooms– the Streeton and Condor rooms had separate dances each featuring different music styles. The Streeton room featured ‘old-time’ music and the Condor Room, jazz. Free buses brought patrons from Melbourne’s northern suburbs. The dances were hugely popular, over 2,000 people would attend on a Saturday night. Many locals recount meeting their future spouses at the ’Berg. The dances continued until the 1970s.

== Description ==
Two architectural firms, Peck & Kemter and A. C. Leith & Bartlett were appointed in association to design the new civic centre. Bartlett had recently returned from overseas where he was greatly influenced by recent architecture in Europe. The City of Heidelberg was desirous of a progressive modern image. Externally the design owes much to the seminal Hilversum Town Hall in The Netherlands, designed by Willem Dudok and constructed between 1924 and 1931. The interior shows the influence of Art Deco design. The building is designed in the inter-war stripped Classical style with a streamlined Classical formation with emphasised verticals and simple surface treatments.

Built by local contractor, G. S. Gay, the Heidelberg Town Hall stands at the highest point of Ivanhoe as an imposingly monumental building. The different functions of offices and auditorium are clearly expressed in the simple block-like masses which are arranged asymmetrically, separated by the 28-metre-tall (92 ft) clock tower. The building is faced with textured exposed buff brickwork with a minimum of applied decorative detail, although there is restrained brick quoining at the corners, some bas-relief logos, stonework panelling around door and window openings, decorative metal work tracery grilles over windows and margin glazing on the casement windows. The overall effect is severe, functional and authoritarian. Vertical accents are provided to the principal elevation not only by the clocktower but also by the massive three-quarter height triplet of door and window openings to the hall. The portico added in 1994 attempted a contextual solution but unfortunately now partially obscures this important element.

The front elevation has three doorways surmounted by tall elongated window slots covered by decorative metal tracery in circular patterns. This bay of the facade has the building title Town Hall and coat of arms inscribed in the brickwork at the centre top. There is a modern entrance canopy indicating the entrance to the great hall over the central doorway. Another main doorway is situated on a second bay along this facade. This is of similar design with an elongated tracery decorated window above and brickwork legend declaring the City of Heidelberg. The sides of the building are also divided into several bays. The front bays have large rectangular windows to ground and first floors with large vertical bands of linenfold stonework detailing between them; the back bays of the building have arched windows. Each face of the tower contains a green neon illuminated clock face applied directly to the face of the brickwork. The tower is a landmark visible for a large part of the municipality.

The auditorium, now known as the Great Hall, capable of seating 1,000 people, achieves a very wide clear span by incorporating an innovative welded steel frame in its structure. The parquetry floor is flanked by vestibules for lounge seating. Above the vestibules are arcades with curved balconies overlooking the auditorium. Internally the building makes extensive use of Australian native timber, principally Queensland maple. Art Deco-style fittings include original light fittings and concealed lighting, door furniture, clocks, some original signage, and use of chrome and marble. Although there have been some alterations, there are several spaces within the building which have high integerity, and are a contributory part of the distinctive styling of the building and which assist in an understanding of the responsibilities of local government in Victoria in the 1930s. These include the entrance to the Municipal offices and the stair lobby on the ground and first floor; the Council Chamber; the Mayor's Room; the first floor hallway connecting the stair lobby and serving the Council chamber, adjoining offices, and the Withers room; the Withers Room; the whole of the Town Hall including the entrance foyer, lounges and associated service rooms and stairways; the Streeton Room (capable of seating 600 people); the Conder Room (note that the original west face-brick external wall is extant); and the northern staircase and associated lobbies serving the Streeton and Conder rooms including the phone box. There are ancillary council rooms at the first floor level which are well preserved with the original timber veneering and plaster finishes.

A substantial addition creating office space was added to the south of the building in the early 1970s. A carriage loop and forecourt is situated in front of the building.

The architects were awarded the Royal Victorian Institute of Architects (RVIA) Street Architecture Medal for 1939 for the building's design. The RVIA commented on the strong character of the building and commended the texture and colour of the brick elevations.

== See also ==
- Architecture of Melbourne
- List of places on the Victorian Heritage Register in the City of Banyule
- List of town halls in Melbourne
