= Moe Maestas =

American politician

Antonio Maestas

Member of the New Mexico Senate from the 26th district
- Incumbent
- Assumed office November 16, 2022
- Preceded by: Jacob Candelaria

Member of the New Mexico House of Representatives from the 16th district
- In office January 2007 – November 16, 2022
- Preceded by: Harriet Ruiz
- Succeeded by: Marsella Duarte

Personal details
- Born: Antonio Maestas; July 6, 1968 (age 58) Albuquerque, New Mexico, U.S.
- Party: Democratic
- Education: University of Washington (BA); University of New Mexico (JD)
- Profession: Lawyer

Antonio "Moe" Maestas (born July 6, 1968) is an American attorney and politician from Albuquerque, New Mexico. He is currently serving as a member of the New Mexico Senate from the 26th district, and previously served as a state house representative. Both districts he has represented are located in the West Mesa area of Albuquerque.

== Early life and education ==
Maestas was born in Albuquerque, New Mexico. After graduating from Valley High School, Maestas he moved to Seattle, Washington and worked at El Centro de la Raza as a community organizer. Maestas' uncle, Roberto Meastas, was founder and executive director of El Centro. Moe's father was NM Hall of Fame sports journalist, Frank Maestas. Both were born in Las Vegas, NM.

He earned a Bachelor of Arts in political science and economics from the University of Washington in 1995. While attending college, Maestas worked as a sheeter operator at the Stoneway Carton Company. Maestas moved back to Albuquerque in 1995 to attend law school, earning a Juris Doctor from the University of New Mexico School of Law in 1998.

== Career ==
After graduating from law school, Maestas became an Assistant District Attorney at the Bernalillo County, New Mexico District Attorney's Office, where he prosecuted violent crimes. He then opened his own law practice, MoeJustice Law, in 2003.

In 2022, Maestas was appointed to the New Mexico Senate, succeeding Jacob Candelaria. The Bernalillo County Commission selected Marsella Duarte to serve for the remainder of Maestas's House term. Because Maestas remained on the ballot for his House district and ran unopposed, the commission will select another applicant to serve for the 2023 term.

=== Elections ===
- 2012 Maestas was unopposed for both the June 5, 2012, Democratic primary, winning with 1,888 votes and the November 6, 2012, general election, winning with 8,162 votes.
- 2006 When District 16 Democratic Representative Harriet Ruiz left the Legislature, Maestas ran in the four-way June 6, 2006, Democratic primary, winning with 668 votes (34.3%) and won the November 7, 2006, general election with 5,703 votes (68.6%) against Republican nominee Storm Field.
- 2008 Maestas was unopposed for both the June 8, 2008, Democratic primary, winning with 1,948 votes and the November 4, 2008, general election, winning with 9,474 votes.
- 2010 Maestas was unopposed for both the June 1, 2010, Democratic Primary, winning with 1,561 votes and the November 2, 2010, general election, winning with 5,875 votes.

== Personal life ==
Maestas is married to Vanessa Alarid, a lobbyist.
