= Jada Yuan =

American journalist and author

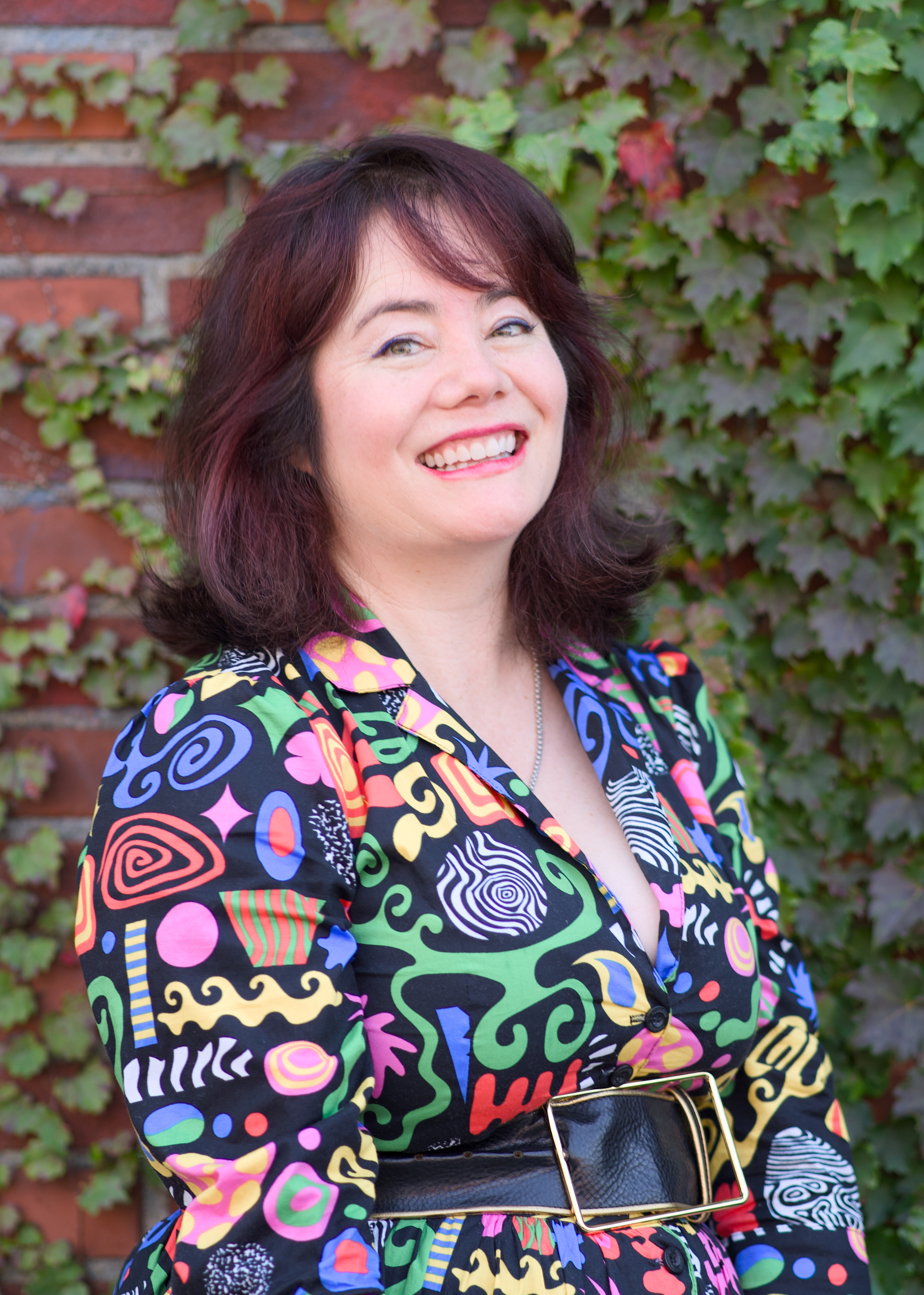
- Born: 1978 (age 47–48); Los Alamos, New Mexico
- Education: Yale University
- Occupations: Journalist and author
- Writing career
- Notable work: Unleashing Oppenheimer: Inside Christopher Nolan’s Explosive Atomic Age Thriller

Jada Yuan is an American journalist and author. She was a writer for The Washington Post. Before that, she spent a decade at New York magazine. In 2018, she was chosen as the New York Times’ inaugural 52 Places Traveler.

== Early life ==
Yuan was born in Los Alamos, New Mexico to a nuclear physicist father and glass artist mother. She graduated from Los Alamos High School in 1996. She holds a degree in history from Yale University.

== Journalism career ==
Yuan started her career in 2000 as an editorial assistant at New York magazine. While she primarily covered entertainment news and celebrity profiles, she also covered the 2008 presidential conventions and the 2014 protests in Ferguson, MO prompted by Michael Brown’s killing by police officer Daniel Wilson.

In 2018, after more than a decade at New York magazine, Yuan beat out 13,000 applicants—including Friday Night Lights author, Buzz Bissinger—to become the New York Times’ inaugural 52 Places Traveler, a writer-at-large who visits and writes about every place listed in the Travel section’s annual "52 Places to Go" issue.

The New York Times’ decision to hire her was based on her experience and talent: "As a writer at New York magazine for the last decade, she has profiled plenty of celebrities, but she has also parachuted into film festivals and presidential conventions — each time having to find her footing in a new place. She knows how to locate interesting people to talk to. And she knows how to insert herself into a piece in a way that is both personal and insightful."

Yuan’s 2019 profile on Stevie Nicks for Vulture earned her a shoutout from the Fleetwood Mac singer on stage: "I would like to dedicate this song to a girl, a lady. Her name is Jada and she wrote the most beautiful article about me. She got something that nobody that has ever written about me before has ever gotten."

In October 2023, Yuan released her first book, Unleashing Oppenheimer: Inside Christopher Nolan’s Explosive Atomic Age Thriller. Slashfilm’s review noted “...it's one of the most enlightening and meticulously pieced together chronicles of filmmaking I've seen in awhile."

Shondaland named Yuan as one of the five women changing the face of journalism.

== Personal life ==
Yuan is the grand-daughter of Chien-Shiung Wu, a Chinese-American physicist who contributed to the Manhattan Project and conducted a landmark experiment that disproved the conservation of parity in weak nuclear interactions—a discovery for which her male colleagues received the 1957 Nobel Prize in Physics, even as Wu herself was excluded. Yuan lives in Brooklyn, NY. She is also the great-great-grand-daughter of Yuan Shikai, a Chinese general and statesman and first president of the Republic of China.
