= Finnbar Maley =

Australian rules footballer (born 2003)

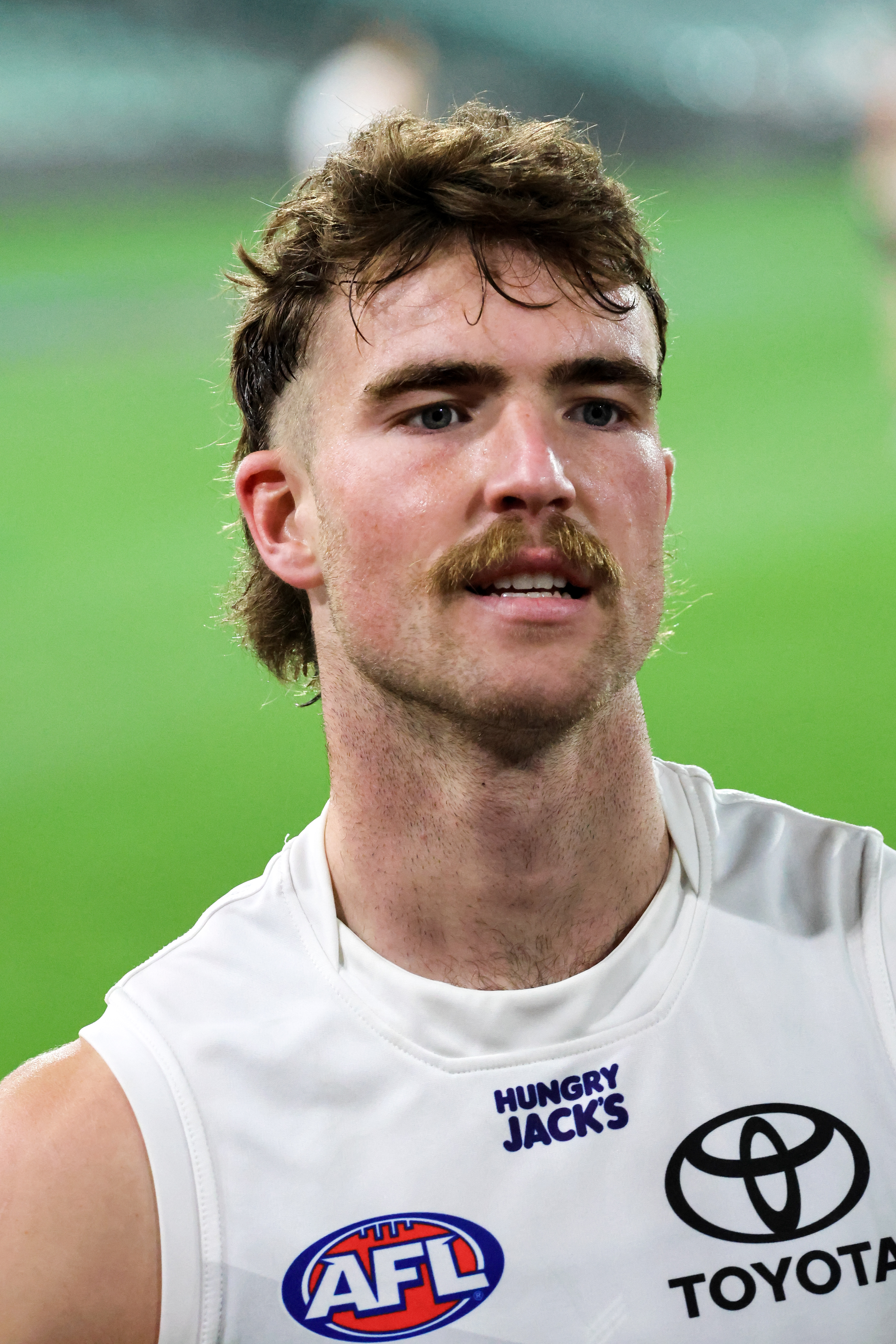
- Maley with Adelaide in July 2026

Personal information
- Full name: Finnbar Kenneth Maley
- Nicknames: Moose, Bar Fridge, Spooky
- Born: 18 July 2003 (age 23)
- Original teams: Northern Bullants (VFL); Eltham (NFNL)
- Draft: No. 2, 2024 rookie draft
- Debut: Round 8, 2025, North Melbourne vs. Essendon, at Docklands Stadium
- Height: 197 cm (6 ft 6 in)

Club information
- Current club: Adelaide
- Number: 36

Playing career^{1}
Years	Club	Games (Goals)
2024–2025	North Melbourne	7 (4)
2026–	Adelaide	6 (4)
Total		13 (8)
- ^{1} Playing statistics correct to the end of 2026.

Finnbar Kenneth Maley (born 18 July 2003) is an Australian rules footballer who plays for the Adelaide Crows in the Australian Football League.

== Early life ==
Maley spent much of his early years participating mostly in basketball with the Eltham Wildcats, but also in Australian rules football with the Eltham Football Club in the Northern Football Netball League. He attended Eltham High School.

== AFL career ==
=== AFL rookie draft selection ===
Maley had a successful season with the Northern Bullants VFL side, and returned in 2023 to his local Eltham Football Club. That year, he led their grand final performance, kicking six goals. He was earmarked for selection, and drafted in the 2024 rookie draft in November 2023 to play with North Melbourne.

=== 2024–2025: Training with North Melbourne, AFL debut ===
Following his draft selection, Maley began training with North Melbourne's AFL side, and playing with their VFL squad. Throughout 2024, he scored 18 goals over 18 games, regularly attaining double-digit numbers of possessions.

On 30 April 2025, it was announced that Maley would make his debut in round 8 in North Melbourne's away game at Marvel Stadium against Essendon. He kicked a goal with his first kick in AFL football. He finished the 2025 season having played seven games and kicking four goals.

=== 2025–present: Trade to Adelaide ===
On 15 October 2025, Maley was traded to the Adelaide Crows in exchange for pick 57 and a 2026 fourth round selection. He made his club debut in round 3 against Geelong, replacing the rested veteran Taylor Walker.

== Personal life ==
Maley's father, Paul Maley, was born and raised in the United States and later moved to Australia where he played in the National Basketball League (NBL). His mother also played basketball. Maley's older sister, Anneli, plays in the Women's National Basketball League.

In 2025, Maley completed a psychology degree at RMIT University in Melbourne.

== Statistics ==
Updated to the end of round 22, 2026.

Legend
G	Goals	K	Kicks	D	Disposals	T	Tackles
B	Behinds	H	Handballs	M	Marks	H/O	Hit-outs

Season	Team	No.	Games	Totals								Averages (per game)								Votes
Season	Team	No.	Games	G	B	K	H	D	M	T	H/O	G	B	K	H	D	M	T	H/O	Votes
2024	North Melbourne	39	0	—	—	—	—	—	—	—	—	—	—	—	—	—	—	—	—	0
2025	North Melbourne	39	7	4	3	22	24	46	19	13	11	0.6	0.4	3.1	3.4	6.6	2.7	1.9	1.6	0
2026	Adelaide	36	6	4	2	20	21	41	20	12	29	0.7	0.3	3.3	3.5	6.8	3.3	2.0	4.8	0
Career			13	8	5	42	45	87	39	25	40	0.6	0.4	3.2	3.5	6.7	3.0	1.9	3.1	0
