= SITE Santa Fe =

Non-profit organization based in the U.S.

SITE SANTA FE
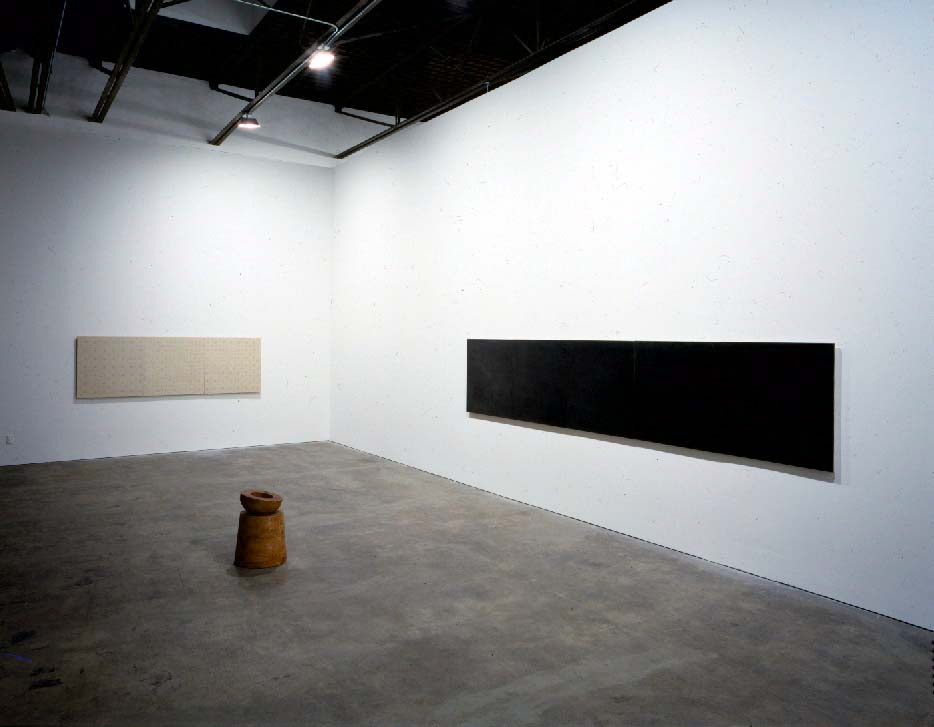
- 1995 exhibition at SITE Santa Fe
- Established: February 1, 1995
- Location: 1606 Paseo de Peralta, Santa Fe, New Mexico
- Coordinates: 35.6813983°N 105.9497264°W
- Type: contemporary art
- Visitors: ~60,000 (2025)
- Director: Louis Grachos
- Website: sitesantafe.org

SITE Santa Fe (often referred to simply as SITE) is a nonprofit contemporary arts organization based in Santa Fe, New Mexico. Since its founding in 1995, SITE Santa Fe has presented 11 biennials, more than 90 contemporary art exhibitions, and works by more than 800 artists.

== History ==
In 1992, local gallery owner Laura Carpenter conceived the idea of SITE Santa Fe, soliciting donations that would eventually total more than $1 million. A third of the collected funds went into the renovation of a rail side warehouse into 19,000 feet of exhibition space by New York architect Richard Gluckman.

SITE Santa Fe, curated by Bruce W. Ferguson, was started in 1995 with the goal of hosting the only biennial of contemporary art in the entire United States. For the biennial's first edition, Ferguson and co-curator Vince Varga selected 31 artists from 13 countries to participate.

The first of these biennials was launched on July 14, 1995, and ran through October 8, 1995. In 1997, SITE Santa Fe was commissioning institution for the United States pavilion at the Venice Biennale.

The seventh biennial, Lucky Number Seven, opened on Lucky Number Seven, opened June 22, 2008. The exhibit, curated by Lance Fung, featured the work of 25 artists from 16 different countries. The exhibition was documented online by a student documentary team from the Media Arts Program at New Mexico Highlands University, the New Media Arts Program at the Institute of American Indian Arts, and other local arts programs. Many community members collaborate with SITE Santa Fe, such as Deborah Fritz, a local curator and gallerist.
