= Harriet Ruiz =

American politician

Member of the New Mexico House of Representatives from the 16th district
- In office 2004–2006
- Preceded by: Ray Ruiz
- Succeeded by: Moe Maestas

Personal details
- Born: Albuquerque, New Mexico, U.S.
- Party: Democratic

Harriet Ruiz is an American politician who served as a member of the New Mexico House of Representatives for the 16th district from 2004 to 2006.

== Early life and education ==
Ruiz was born in Albuquerque, New Mexico and attended Los Alamos High School.

== Career ==
Ruiz was appointed to the New Mexico House of Representatives in 2004 to fill the seat left vacant by her husband. to represent the 16th district, which includes the West Mesa area of Albuquerque, New Mexico. Ruiz served until 2006, and was succeeded by Moe Maestas.

== Personal life ==
Ruiz met her husband, Ray Ruiz, while attending Los Alamos High School. They married in October 1958 and four children. Ray was an ironworker and welder who served in the New Mexico House of Representatives. Ray died of Mesothelioma on May 9, 2004, believed to have been caused by his work at the Los Alamos National Laboratory 30 years prior.
