= Sharin Anderson =

Australian musician, singer, & songwriter (born 1959)

Sharin Anderson (born 26 October 1959) is an Australian singer, guitarist, songwriter, and artist from the outer northern suburbs of Melbourne.

== Early life ==
Anderson was born in Ivanhoe, Victoria and grew up in the Montmorency area attending Briar Hill Primary School and Eltham High School.

Between 1967 and 1973, Sharin studied guitar with Wally Johnson. (Note: Wally Johnson was co-writer of the celebrated Australian folk song Give Me A Home Among The Gumtrees. See lyric at "Give Me A Home Among The Gumtrees" Lyrics on John Williamson Website)) She started song writing and performing while in High School in school concerts and talent quests as well as solo performances at Melbourne venues such as The Outpost Inn. (Note: History of the Australian Folk Revival) In 1975, she became backing vocalist with "The Salters Rush Blues Band".

== Career ==
After leaving school in 1976, she worked at gigs and a variety of jobs including waitress at Panton Hill Hotel and running a clothing and gift shop in Northcote. In 1977, she began to be given lead vocal parts while working with "Overproof & The Distiller Sisters".

In 1978, she joined with some former members of the Eltham band, "Reuben Tice" to form "The Sharin Anderson Band" and began performing at Melbourne venues such as "Marijuhana House", "Christmas Hills Festival", and "Movement Against Uranium Mining" benefit concerts.

From 1982 to 1986, Anderson performed with the Sharin Anderson Band as well as solo gigs and work with a range of Melbourne bands including "The Perfect Hosts" (backing vocals), "The Robbie Greig Band" (backing vocals), "The Connection" (lead & backing vocals), "Bluey" (main vocals), "The Motown Jackets" (main vocals).

In 1986, Anderson formed "Hey Gringo" and performed originals and covers at venues such as The Cricketers Arms, Panton Hill Hotel and St Andrews Hotel.

In 1988, Sharin modelled for the painter Clifton Pugh whom she had met through her work at the Panton Hill Hotel where he was a regular patron. In gratitude, Shane Pugh (Clifton's son) gave her one of the limited edition colour etchings of the work in which she appeared – "Leda and the Swan 1" (1989). Sharin also modelled several times during 1988–1989 for Rick Amor and Prue Acton at Pugh's property, Dunmoochin.

In 1989, Sharin won a singer/ songwriting competition run by Creative Synergies which provided 250 hours of studio recording time at Silkwood Studios (formerly York Street Studios) in Nth Fitzroy. She recorded 12 original songs including "Do They Say To You", "That's Enough For Me" and "Let's Not Fool".

During 1990–1993, Anderson also found musical work as a session vocalist for advertising jingles with Silkwood Studios and also occasionally with Burkhard Dallwitz. In 1990, Sharin recorded a version of her song titled "Buried Alive" at Peter Mumme's Studio in Christmas Hills (with Peter playing keyboards/synthesiser). Sharin got to the finals in the "Best Unsigned Band Competition" of 1992 run by The Musician Magazine (The finals judges were Chrissie Hynde, Sun Ra, Don Was, Bootsy Collins and John Hiatt).

From 1993 to 1996, Anderson performed at Melbourne venues and festivals with a band line-up called "Sharin Anderson and The Blue Angels". In 1994, she reached the finals in the "Blues Performer of the Year". In 1996, she sang backing vocals on Debbie Morrow's CD "Violence in Animation"

In 1996, Anderson needed a more certain income stream and qualified and commenced work as a support worker for people with intellectual disabilities.

In the mid-1990s, Anderson started drawing with coloured pen and ink and created hundreds of abstract patterned [mandala|mandalas] as well as square and rectangular geometric designs. She also began to create drawings based on the surrounding urban landscapes in the inner northern suburbs of Melbourne.

In 1998, Anderson formed "Lola's Delight" with Nadine Budge and Marni Sheehan and performed around Melbourne in venues such as The Lomond Hotel, The Brunswick Music Festival, (Note: The Brunswick Music festival) Ruckers (now Wesley Annes of Northcote (Note: Wesley Annes of Northcote)), The Maldon Folk Festival (Note: Maldon Folk Festival) and the Eltham Festival.

In 2002, Anderson occasionally contributed backing vocals and guitar with "The Urban Nomads" and on their recording of "Long Way From Water".

In 2009, Anderson exhibited her artwork in Synergy Art Gallery, Northcote.

== Musical Groups ==
- Salters Rush Blues Band (circa 1975): Musicians: Neil Graham (vocals/ harmonica), Ian Wright (drums), Leigh Wright (guitar), Neil Macpherson (keyboards), Ian Horacek (bass guitar), Mark Smith (guitar), Bill Raisbeck (guitar), Sharin Anderson (vocals), Leslie Avril (vocals), Jessica Bateman (vocals)
- Overproof & The Distiller Sisters (circa 1977): Musicians: Bob Pritchard (drums), Nigel Spencer (bass), Tim Shanasy (keyboards), Bill Raisbeck (guitar/ vocals), Peter Vanderslys (guitar), Sharin Anderson (vocals), Leslie Avril (vocals), Jessica Bateman (vocals)
- Sharin Anderson Band 1 (1978–1979) : Musicians: Sharin Anderson (vocals), Vic Lamnek (drums), George Kirov (bass), Roger Davies (guitar), Mark Smith (guitar), Glen Milne (manager).
  - Recording Session 1: "Mousetrap Boogie"(George Kiron (music), Sharin Anderson (lyrics)). Recorded in the lounge room of Freddie Strauks; "Down The Road" (Roger Davies); "Helltown" (Roger Davies (music), Sharin Anderson (lyrics); "Midnight Drinker" (Mark Smith).
  - Recording Session 2: "Buried Alive" (Sharin Anderson), "Wood Keeps Burning" (Roger Davies), "Darkness Falls" (Roger Davies), "In & Out Of Love" (Roger Davies (music), Sharin Anderson (lyrics)); "Katmandu" (Mark Smith). Recorded at Richmond Recorders. Engineered by Tony Cohen.
- Stripes (1980–1981): Top 40 cover band formerly known in Australia as "Magna Carta" which toured Victorian and NSW venues. Musicians: Sharin Anderson (vocals), Others unknown.
- Sharin Anderson Band 2 (1983): Musicians: Sharin Anderson (vocals), Jeff Barnes (drums), Gary Phillipson (bass), Chris Pettifer (guitar), Robbie Dixon (keyboards), Steve Williams (saxophone).
  - Recording: 3 songs (unreleased) at Armstrong Studios (AAV) South Melbourne, engineered by James "Jimbo" Barton. (Note: James "Jimbo" Barton Discography)
- The Perfect Hosts (circa 1982) Musicians: Sharin Anderson (backing vocals), Terry Campbell(songwriter/main vocals), Peter Mumme (keyboards/synthesiser), Gary Phillipson, George Kirov & Ian Davies (all played bass in different line-ups), Jamie Slagmolen & Vic Lamnek (drums), Jeff Arthur (guitar), Mark Smith (guitar), Glenda McNiece and Helen Brown (backing vocals). Peter Mumme made several unreleased recordings.
- Robbie Greig Band and Spiritz (1980–1984) Musicians: Robbie Greig (songwriter, main vocals, guitar), Anton Baker (electric guitar), Jamie Slagmolen & Barry Webster (drums), Gary Phillipson and Angelo Sartori (bass), Sharin Anderson and Nerida Kirov (backing vocals).
- The Connection (circa 1985) Musicians: Neil Sebastian (main vocals, bass), Sharin Anderson (lead and backing vocals/percussion), Jamie Dickson (drums), Steve Dickson (guitar), Mark Smith (guitar).
- Bluey (circa 1985) Musicians: Sharin Anderson (vocals, guitar), Mark Smith (guitar), Gary Phillipson (bass), Geoff Hassall (drums).
- The Motown Jackets (circa 1986) Musicians: Sharin Anderson (vocals, guitar), Quentin Frayne (drums), Mark Smith (guitar), Gary Phillipson (bass), Vern Kicken (vocals, percussion).
- Hey Gringo (1986–1990): Musicians: Sharin Anderson (vocals, guitar), Vic Lamnek and Geoff Hassall (drums), Mark Smith (guitar, vocals), Mick Stilo and Gary Phillipson (bass).
  - Recording: 3 songs at Metropolis Studios (South Melbourne) in 1988: "Passing Strangers" (Sharin Anderson), "Good To Me" (Sharin Anderson), "Kind Of Love" (Sharin Anderson)
- Sharin Anderson Band 3 (1990–1992): Musicians: Sharin Anderson (vocals, guitar), Jeff Barnes (drums), Gary Phillipson (bass), Mark Smith (guitar), Stuart Wilkinson (keyboards).
- Sharin Anderson & The Blue Angels (1993–1996): Musicians: Sharin Anderson (vocals, guitar), Vic Lamnek (Drums), Gary Phillipson (Bass), Mark Smith (Guitar, vocals), David Adam (Guitar)
- Lola's Delight (1998–2002): Musicians: Sharin Anderson (vocals, guitar), Marni Sheehan (guitar, mandolin, piano accordion, vocals), Nadine Budge (guitar, bass, vocals).
  - CD Release: "Pink Sky At Night" (2000) including guest musicians: Kavisha Mazzella (Piano accordion), Janine De Lorenzo (keyboards), Dave Sheehan (National steel guitar), Andy Baylor (Fiddle); Engineered by Nigel Derricks at Bakehouse Lane Studio, Nth Fitzroy (formerly York Street/ Silkwood Studio).
- Bella (2001–2002): Musicians: Jodie Moran (guitar, vocals), Sharin Anderson (guitar, vocals), Rachel Morrison (vocals, percussion)
  - "Something About The Rain" (Jodie Moran): Recorded at Wild Dog Hill Studios (Note: Wild Dog Hill Studios Website) (St Andrews, Melbourne). Engineered by Sandro Donati.
- "The Secret Life of Us" (TV Series – Series 3 – Episode 8) (2003)
  - Song "World beneath My Feet" (Sharin Anderson (vocals), Chris Pettifer (Note: Chris Pettifer, IMDB Entry) (songwriter, engineer))
- The Urban Nomads (2002)
  - Recording: "Long Way From Water" Sharin Anderson (backing vocals, guitar) (Double Diamond Records and engineered and produced by Andrew Denholm (Note: Andrew Denholm MySpace Site) and Bill Jackson (Note: Bill Jackson MySpace Site)
- The Stetson Family (Note: The Stetson Family MySpace Site) (2009)
  - CD "Hey Sister Mary". Song: "Brother Harlan" (by Nadine Budge); Sharin Anderson (backing vocals)

== Original Compositions Recorded ==
- Band: Hey Gringo (1988). Recorded at Metropolis Studios (South Melbourne)
  - "Passing Strangers" (Sharin Anderson)
  - "Good To Me" (Sharin Anderson)
  - "Kind Of Love" (Sharin Anderson)
- Band: Sharin Anderson Band 1(1978–1979). Recorded in Freddie Strauk's (Note: Freddie Strauk was drummer in the band Skyhooks) Lounge Room
  - "Mousetrap Boogie" – Sharin Anderson (lyrics), George Kiron (music)
  - "Down The Road" (Roger Davies)
  - "Helltown" – Roger Davies (music), Sharin Anderson (lyrics)
  - "Midnight Drinker" (Mark Smith)
  - And 5 songs recorded at Richmond Recorders (1978) engineered by Toney Cohen
    - "Buried Alive" (Sharin Anderson)
    - "Darkness Falls"(Roger Davies)
    - "Wood Keeps Burning"(Roger Davies)
    - "Katmandu"(Mark Smith)
    - "In & Out of Love" (Sharin Anderson & Roger Davies).
- Band: Sharin Anderson Band 3 (1990). Recorded at Silkwood Studios (formerly York Street Studios) Nth Fitzroy and engineered by Kevin Kerr.
  - "Let's Not Fool" (Sharin Anderson) Guest artists: Greg Ham (saxophone), Scott Tinkler (trumpet), Bruce Sandell (saxophone), Steve Williams (saxophone).
  - "Do They Say To You" (Sharin Anderson)
  - "That's Enough For Me" (Sharin Anderson)
- Sharin Anderson (1991). Recorded by Polyester Records in "Made in Melbourne Volume 1", a compilation album featuring 21 Melbourne bands.
  - "Do They Say To You".
- Sharin Anderson (1991). Recorded, produced and engineered by Peter Mumme (Note: Peter Mumme used Sharin's vocals on various musical projects)
  - "Set on Going". A solo recording of 8 original songs written by Sharin Anderson.
- Sharin Anderson (1992). Recorded, produced and engineered by Harvey Welsh
  - "Airwaves". A duo recording with Gary Phillipson of 12 original songs written by Sharin Anderson and including the song "Airwaves" was written by Robbie Dixon.
- Sharin Anderson (1994). Recorded in "Cloudburstz Acoustics – Volume 1", a compilation CD of 15 Melbourne singer/ songwriters.
  - "That Was Then" (Sharin Anderson)
- Sharin Anderson (1997). Recorded at Rob Harwood Studio (Note: Rob Harwood's Studio Site)
  - "Maree" (Sharin Anderson, Janine De Lorenzo (piano))
- Sharin Anderson (1997), Recorded in "Bloomers One", a compilation CD of 16 Australian female singer/ songwriters.
  - "How Could I Know" (Sharin Anderson)
- Band: Lola's Delight (2000). Recorded in "Pink Sky At Night"
  - "Squeeze A Little Tighter" (Sharin Anderson)
  - "I've Cried So Much" (Sharin Anderson)
  - "Alma's Garden" (Sharin Anderson)
  - "That's Enough For Me" (Sharin Anderson)
- Band: Bluehouse (Note: Bluehouse WebSite) (2001). Recorded in CD "6 Minutes of Breathable Air" (produced by James Black & Bluehouse).
  - "Another World" (Sharin Anderson)
- Band Bluehouse (2007). Recorded in CD "One More Kiss" (produced by Tommy Emmanuel).
  - "Beside You" (Sharin Anderson)
