= University of New Mexico–Los Alamos =

Community college in Los Alamos, New Mexico, US

Coordinates: 35.88531°N 106.31862°W

University of New Mexico-Los Alamos
- Type: Public community college
- Established: 1980
- Chancellor: Mike Holtzclaw
- Students: 727
- Location: Los Alamos, New Mexico, United States
- Website: losalamos.unm.edu

The University of New Mexico–Los Alamos (UNM-LA) in Los Alamos, New Mexico, is a branch campus of the University of New Mexico. UNM-LA offers 14 certificate programs and 18 associate degree programs. In addition, UNM-LA offers a Dual Credit program, which allows high school students to take college classes; an adult basic education program for students seeking their New Mexico High School Equivalency Credential (the General Education Development (GED) or HiSet); and an ESL (English as a Second Language) program. Students often work part-time at Los Alamos National Laboratory.

== Campus ==
UNM-LA is located in central Los Alamos.

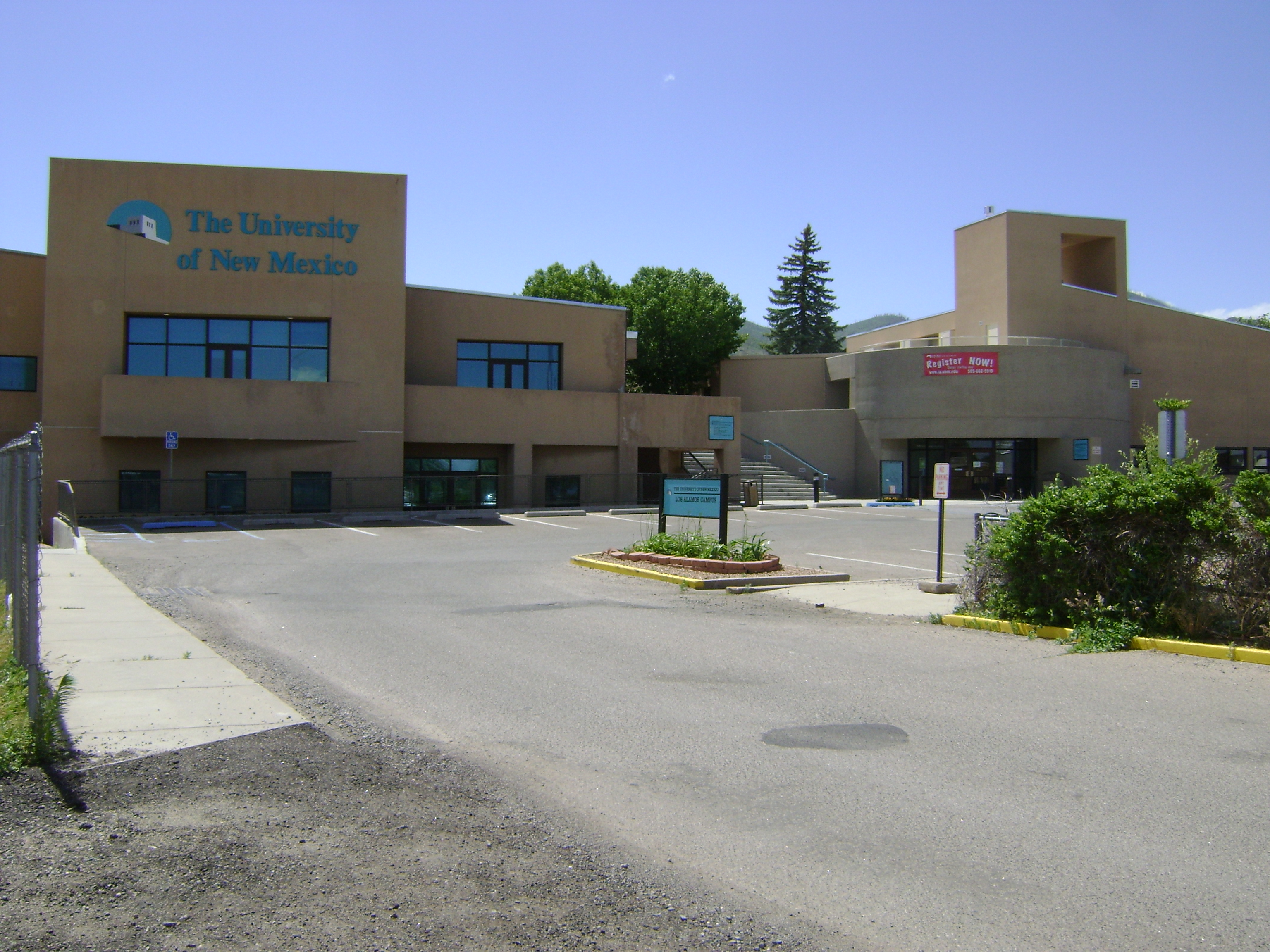
The east entrance to campus

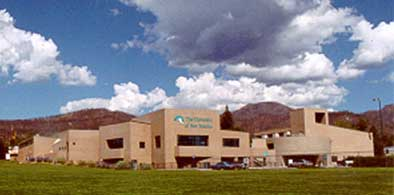
The campus from Sullivan Field

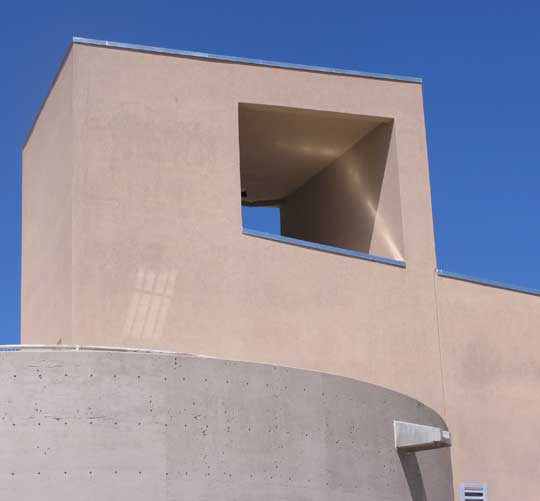
Library tower
