= Latrobe =

Latrobe or La Trobe may refer to:

== People ==
- Benjamin Henry Latrobe (1764–1820), architect of the United States Capitol, brother of C. I. Latrobe
- Benjamin Henry Latrobe II (1806–1878), (or sometimes "Jr."), an engineer, son of B. H. Latrobe
- Charles La Trobe (1801–1875), first lieutenant-governor of Victoria, Australia, son of C. I. Latrobe
- Charles Hazlehurst Latrobe, (1833–1902), engineer, bridge-builder, architect, son of B. H. Latrobe II
- Christian Ignatius Latrobe (1758–1836), English clergyman and musician
- Ferdinand Claiborne Latrobe (1833–1911), seven-time mayor of Baltimore, son of John H. B. Latrobe
- Henry Sellon Latrobe (1792–1817), architect, eldest son of B. H. Latrobe
- John H. B. Latrobe (1803–1891), writer, lawyer, historian, artist, inventor, civic activist, son of B. H. Latrobe

== Geography ==
=== Australia ===
- City of Latrobe, Victoria
- Latrobe River, West Gippsland, Victoria
- Latrobe Valley, Gippsland, Victoria
- Mount LaTrobe, Wilsons Promontory, Victoria
- Latrobe, Tasmania, a town
- Latrobe Council, Tasmania
- Division of La Trobe, Victoria, an electoral division
- La Trobe Street, Melbourne

=== United States ===
- Latrobe, California, an unincorporated community
- Latrobe, Pennsylvania, a city
- Latrobe, West Virginia, an unincorporated community and coal town
- Latrobe Park, Baltimore, a public park in Locust Point, Maryland

== Schools ==
- Banksia Latrobe Secondary College, Heidelberg West, Victoria, Australia
- Charles La Trobe College, Macleod, Victoria, Australia
- La Trobe University, Victoria, Australia
  - La Trobe University College of Northern Victoria, Bendigo

== Sports ==
- Latrobe Football Club of Latrobe, Tasmania
- Latrobe Athletic Association of Latrobe, Pennsylvania, from 1895 to 1909, one of the earliest professional American football teams
- Latrobe (horse), thoroughbred racehorse, winner of the 2018 Irish Derby

== Other uses ==
- HMAS Latrobe, a Royal Australian Navy corvette
- Latrobe Brewing Company in Latrobe, Pennsylvania
- Latrobe Stove, a cast-iron stove for home or room heating invented in the early 1800s
- The La Trobe Journal, a scholarly journal of the State Library Victoria, Australia
