= Head Teacher's residence =

Heritage-listed house in Melbourne, Victoria, Australia

- Location of the house in Greater Metropolitan Melbourne

General information
- Status: Completed
- Type: House
- Architectural style: Victorian Gothic Revival
- Location: 114 Cape Street, Heidelberg, City of Banyule, Melbourne, Victoria, Australia
- Coordinates: 37°45′18″S 145°04′04″E
- Year built: 1877–1879
- Completed: 1878; 148 years ago
- Client: Education Department
- Owner: Education Department

Technical details
- Material: Bricks; slate

Design and construction
- Architect: Henry Bastow
- Architecture firm: Victorian Department of Public Works
- Main contractor: Hood and Kells

Victorian Heritage Register
- Official name: Former Head Teacher's Residence
- Type: Registered place
- Designated: 20 August 1982
- Reference no.: H1617
- Heritage overlay no.: HO17
- Categories: Education; Residential buildings (private)

Register of the National Estate
- Official name: Schoolmasters House (former)
- Type: Defunct register
- Designated: 30 June 1992
- Reference no.: 15729

The Head Teacher's residence is a house that, from 1878 to c. 1905 served as the house for the head teacher of the local government primary school, located at 114 Cape Street in Heidelberg, in the City of Banyule, in the northern suburbs of Melbourne, in Victoria, Australia. Whilst the house remains extant, the building is no longer used for teacher housing.

Built in 1878 on the traditional lands of the Wurundjeri people, the house was added to the Victorian Heritage Register on 20 August 1982 in recognition of its architectural and historical significance; and was also added to non-statutory lists by the Victorian branch of the National Trust on 30 June 1977 and the now defunct Register of the National Estate on 30 June 1992.

== History ==
The head teacher's residence at Heidelberg was constructed between 1877 and 1878 when it was decided to replace the existing Heidelberg State School (No. 294) with a new school building. The existing school was the first government school in the district, built on this site in 1853, however a decision was made to replace it due to the expected expansion of pupil numbers. The head teacher's residence was located on the block adjacent to the school, and both buildings were designed by Henry Bastow of the Victorian Department of Public Works. Although the Education Department provided accommodation for many teachers, few head teacher's residences are known to have been purpose built in the nineteenth century. Also it was more common to incorporate accommodation into the schools themselves rather than have them separate.

Both the school building and the adjoining, detached residence were designed in the Victorian Gothic Revival style, the school displaying polychromatic brickwork and the residence having a render finish. This style was typical of Bastow's work of the period with many school buildings of various sizes displaying Gothic Revival characteristics. The school buildings were replaced in 1922–1923, although a small portion of the 1878 building was incorporated in the north-west corner of the new building.

The first occupant of the house was the widow of the former head teacher, a Mrs Mattingley. Another occupant was Alex Kelso, Presbyterian headmaster of Heidelberg State School, who was particularly active in the community during his sixteen-year stay there; helping to form the Heidelberg Branch of the Bank of Hope and being influential in the construction of the Mechanics Institute Recreation Hall in 1892. Kelso eventually moved out because of the poor state of repair of the house and he sub-rented it.

Due to its size and condition, the building became inappropriate for teacher accommodation and, from 1905, the house was tenanted. By 1922 it had become known as the caretaker's quarters and remained in use as such until recently. Renovation work was undertaken by the school in 2000 for its conversion for school use.

Often the metropolitan area teachers were assumed to have their own residence. The head teacher's residence in Cape Street is the only recognisable remnant from the school building activity in the 1870s. The 1920s school relates to the architectural styles of its period and the mass of California bungalow derived housing built in Heidelberg after World War I.

== Description ==
The rendered brick house has a steeply pitched slate roof and the asymmetrical, picturesque composition incorporates a projecting front bay with jerkin head roof, iron finial and pointed arch window. The main cross gabled section incorporates pointed arch windows at either end and did incorporate timber finials and king post trusses. Pointed arch label moulds above windows terminate in moulded bosses and carved timber brackets support projecting eaves.

Designed as a small, five-roomed house, the original residence included three bedrooms, a sitting room and kitchen. Various additions were made to the house in an attempt to make it more habitable, including the construction of the front verandah in the 1880s, the front picket fence in 1888, the back verandah and bathroom in c. 1890, gas was connected in 1904, and in 1922-23 the rear of the house was remodelled. Since then the fence was replaced, a bedroom and kitchen were added at the rear, a window hood placed over the front window, roof gutters and verandah fascia replaced, one roof finial has disappeared, window joinery altered, and the half timbering removed from the transverse gables. Various window changes have been made including the replacement of original casement windows with double hung windows and a sun hood was added to the front window, probably in the early twentieth century. Many structural and maintenance problems have occurred since the house was built, resulting in the need for constant repair work. Inside there are five bedrooms with kitchen, sitting room and bathroom.

There is a projecting front bay with a half hipped roof decorated with an iron finial. The bay has a pointed arch window which is now partly obscured with a shade awning. The house was located on the block next to the school and replicated in miniature the adjoining school, albeit in stucco. The school was also designed by Henry Bastow and was in an Italian polychrome style.

== See also ==
- Architecture of Melbourne
- List of places on the Victorian Heritage Register in the City of Banyule
