= Latrobe Stove =

The Latrobe Stove, also known as a "Baltimore Heater", was a coal-fired parlor heater made of cast iron and fitted into fireplaces as an insert. It served both as a heater and a stove. They were patented in 1846 and were very popular by the 1870s. The squat device was invented by John Hazelhurst Boneval Latrobe (1803–1891). He was the son of noted engineer and architect Benjamin Henry Latrobe II. Latrobe became a patent lawyer and was shy about taking credit for his stoves which succeeded Benjamin Franklin's much larger Franklin stove.

In 1980 there were a small number of antique stove restorers but most old stoves were used for decoration or as planters.
