= Bellfield, Victoria =

Bellfield Melbourne, Victoria
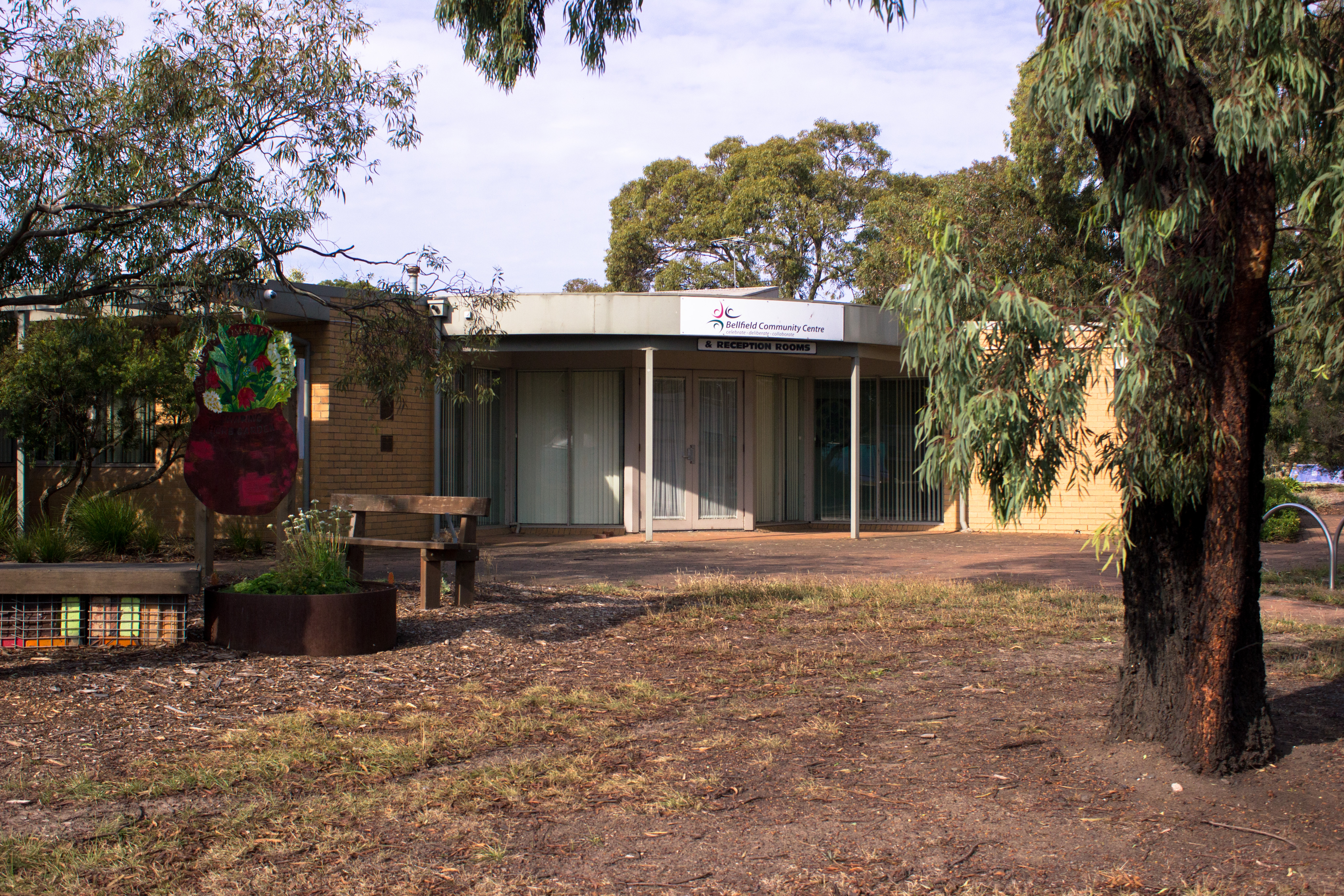
- Bellfield Community Centre

- Coordinates: 37.754°S 145.045°E
- Population: 1,996 (2021 census)
  - Density: 2,220/km^{2} (5,700/sq mi)
- Postcode(s): 3081
- Elevation: 61 m (200 ft)
- Area: 0.9 km^{2} (0.3 sq mi)
- Location: 9 km (6 mi) from Melbourne
- LGA(s): City of Banyule
- State electorate(s): Ivanhoe
- Federal division(s): Jagajaga
Suburbs around Bellfield:
Preston	Heidelberg West	Heidelberg Heights
Preston	Bellfield	Heidelberg Heights
Thornbury	Ivanhoe	Ivanhoe

Bellfield is a suburb of Melbourne, Victoria, Australia, 9 km north-east from Melbourne's central business district, located within the City of Banyule local government area. Bellfield recorded a population of 1,996 at the 2021 census.

== Geography and description ==
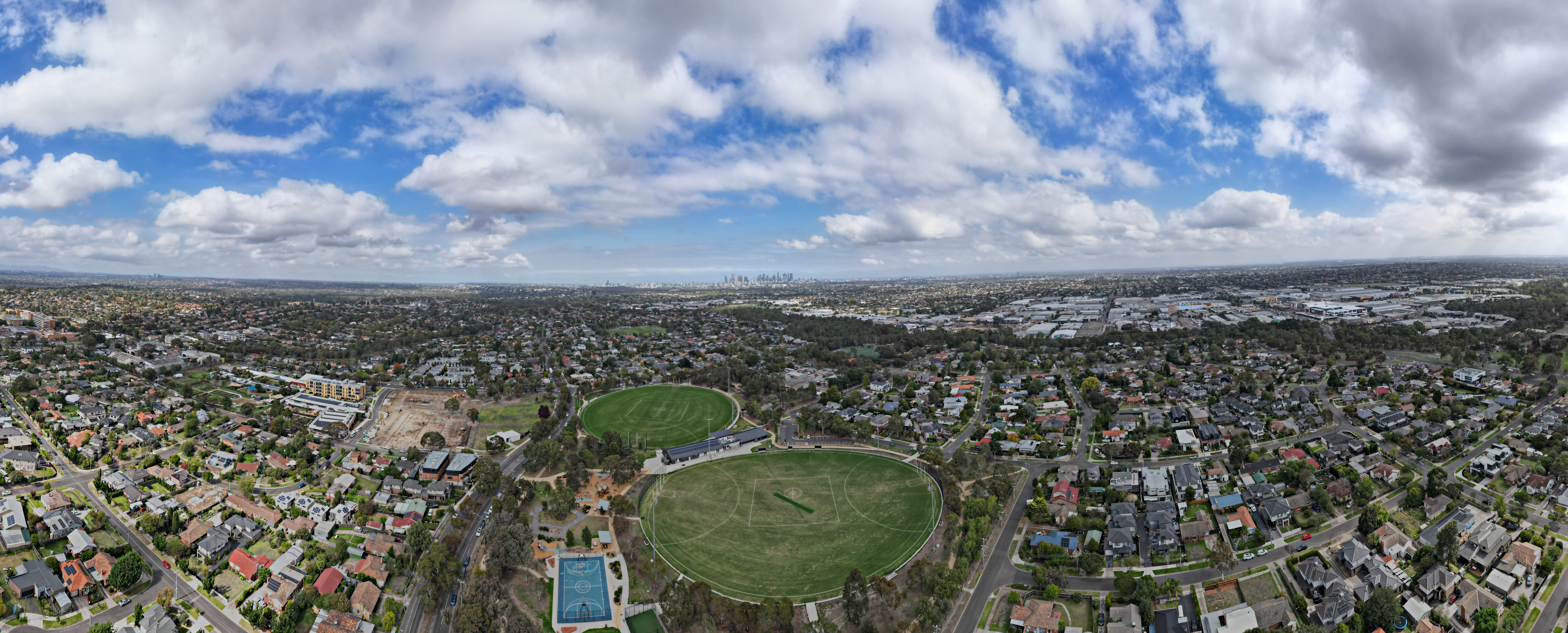
Bellfield from above, facing west to the Melbourne skyline

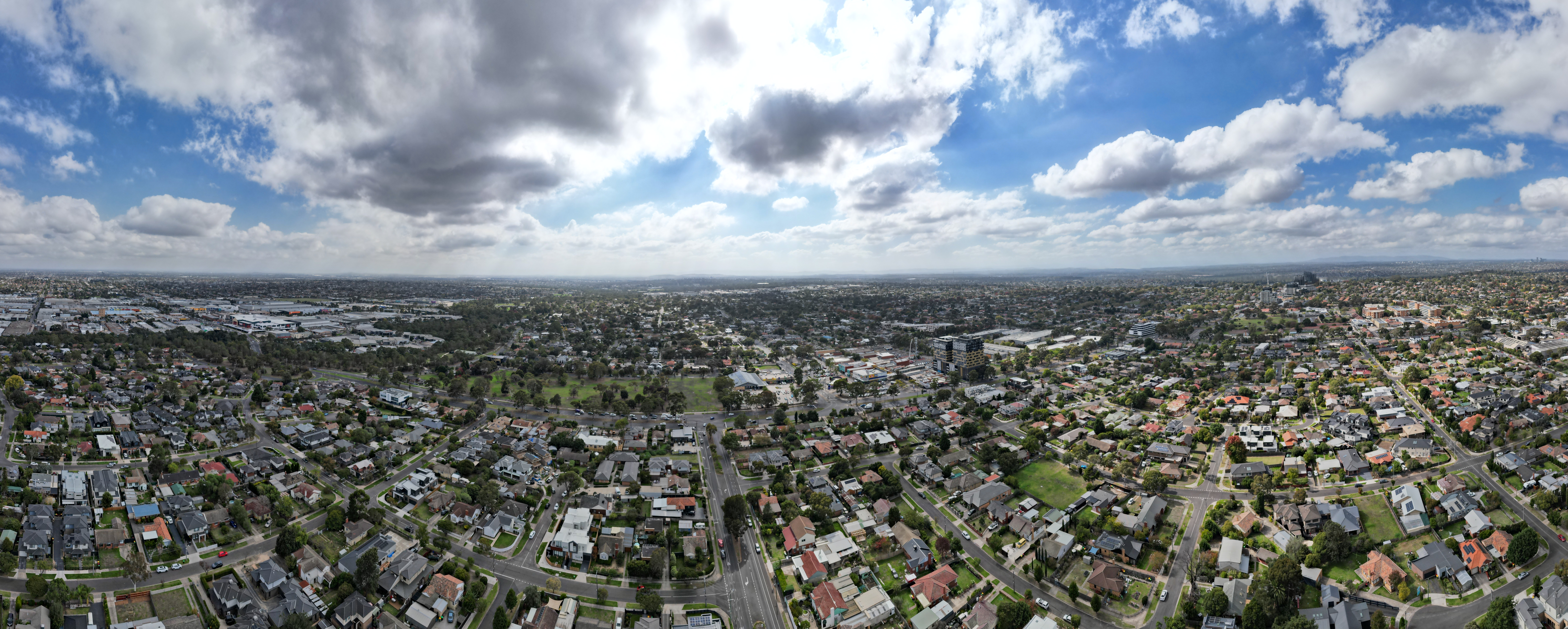
Aerial view of Bellfield facing northeast to the Great Dividing Range

Bellfield is bounded in the west by the Darebin Creek, in the north by Bell Street, in the east by Waterdale Road and in the south by Banksia Street.

Bellfield is primarily residential but includes the Banyule Waste Recovery Centre on Waterdale Road and sporting fields in Ford Park and Liberty Park Reserve on Banksia Street, towards Darebin Creek.

== Facilities ==
Bellfield Cricket Club has represented the suburb in the Heidelberg District Cricket Association since 1934 and is based at Ford Park.

The Bellfield Community Hub Click & Collect Service is provided by Yarra Plenty Regional Library.

== History ==
In 2012 the City of Banyule acquired part of the former Banksia LaTrobe Secondary College in Bellfield which had been decommissioned. It was purchased to allow for high-end residential infill development and also enable revenue to be generated for the council. The Bellfield Urban Design Guidelines were developed and adopted by the council in February 2019.

== Governance ==
Bellfield is part of the federal Division of Jagajaga in the Australian House of Representatives.

== See also ==
- City of Heidelberg – Bellfield was previously within this former local government area.
