= Heidelberg Heights =

Heidelberg Heights Melbourne, Victoria
- Coordinates: 37.742°S 145.053°E
- Population: 6,758 (2021 census)
  - Density: 2,600/km^{2} (6,730/sq mi)
- Postcode(s): 3081
- Elevation: 80 m (262 ft)
- Area: 2.6 km^{2} (1.0 sq mi)
- Location: 11 km (7 mi) from Melbourne
- LGA(s): City of Banyule
- State electorate(s): Ivanhoe
- Federal division(s): Jagajaga
Suburbs around Heidelberg Heights:
Bundoora	Macleod	Rosanna
Heidelberg West	Heidelberg Heights	Heidelberg
Bellfield	Ivanhoe	Eaglemont

Heidelberg Heights is a suburb of Melbourne, Victoria, Australia, 11 km north-east of Melbourne's Central Business District, located within the City of Banyule local government area. Heidelberg Heights recorded a population of 6,758 at the 2021 census.

== History ==
The first Heidelberg Heights Post Office was renamed in 1950 from Heidelberg West (open since 1923) and closed in 1982. In 1983 Heidelberg North office was renamed Heidelberg Heights; this closed in 1993.

In 2012 the City of Banyule acquired the Haig Street Primary School property at 52 Haig Street which had been closed by the Victorian Education Department. A housing development was built by Metricon on the site.

== Facilities ==
Public library services is provided by Yarra Plenty Regional Library. The nearest libraries are at Ivanhoe and Rosanna.

== Sport ==
North Heidelberg Football Club, an Australian rules football team, competes in the Northern Football League.

== See also ==
- City of Heidelberg – Heidelberg Heights was previously within this former local government area.
