= Latrobe, California =

Unincorporated community in California, United States

Latrobe
- Unincorporated community
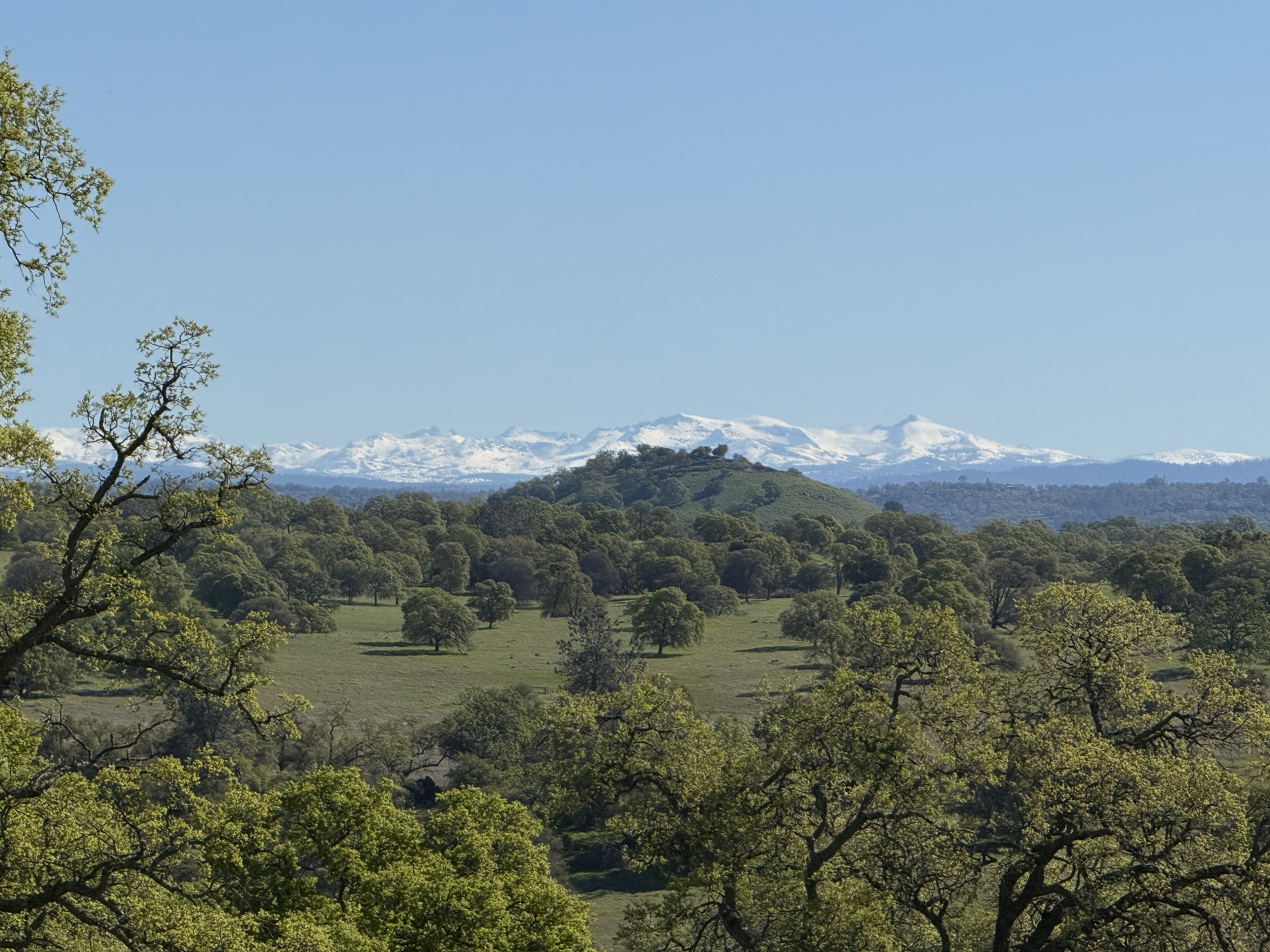
- Sierra Nevada visible from Latrobe

- Location in California Latrobe (the United States)
- Coordinates: 38°33′35″N 120°59′02″W
- Country: United States
- State: California
- County: El Dorado
- Elevation: 761 ft (232 m)

Latrobe (formerly, La Trobe) is an unincorporated community in El Dorado County, California, United States. Today a small community, in its heyday it was an important railroad town with a population of 700 to 800.

Latrobe was the terminus of the Placerville and Sacramento Rail Road. The name, bestowed by F.A. Bishop, chief engineer of the railroad, was in honor of Benjamin Henry Latrobe, II, chief engineer of the Baltimore and Ohio Railroad, America's first railroad. A post office operated at Latrobe from 1864 to 1921.

== Geography ==
Latrobe is located 15 miles (24 km) southwest of Placerville, at an elevation of 761 feet (232 m). According to the Köppen Climate Classification system, Latrobe has a warm-summer Mediterranean climate, abbreviated "Csa" on climate maps.
