= Heidelberg West =

- Suburb
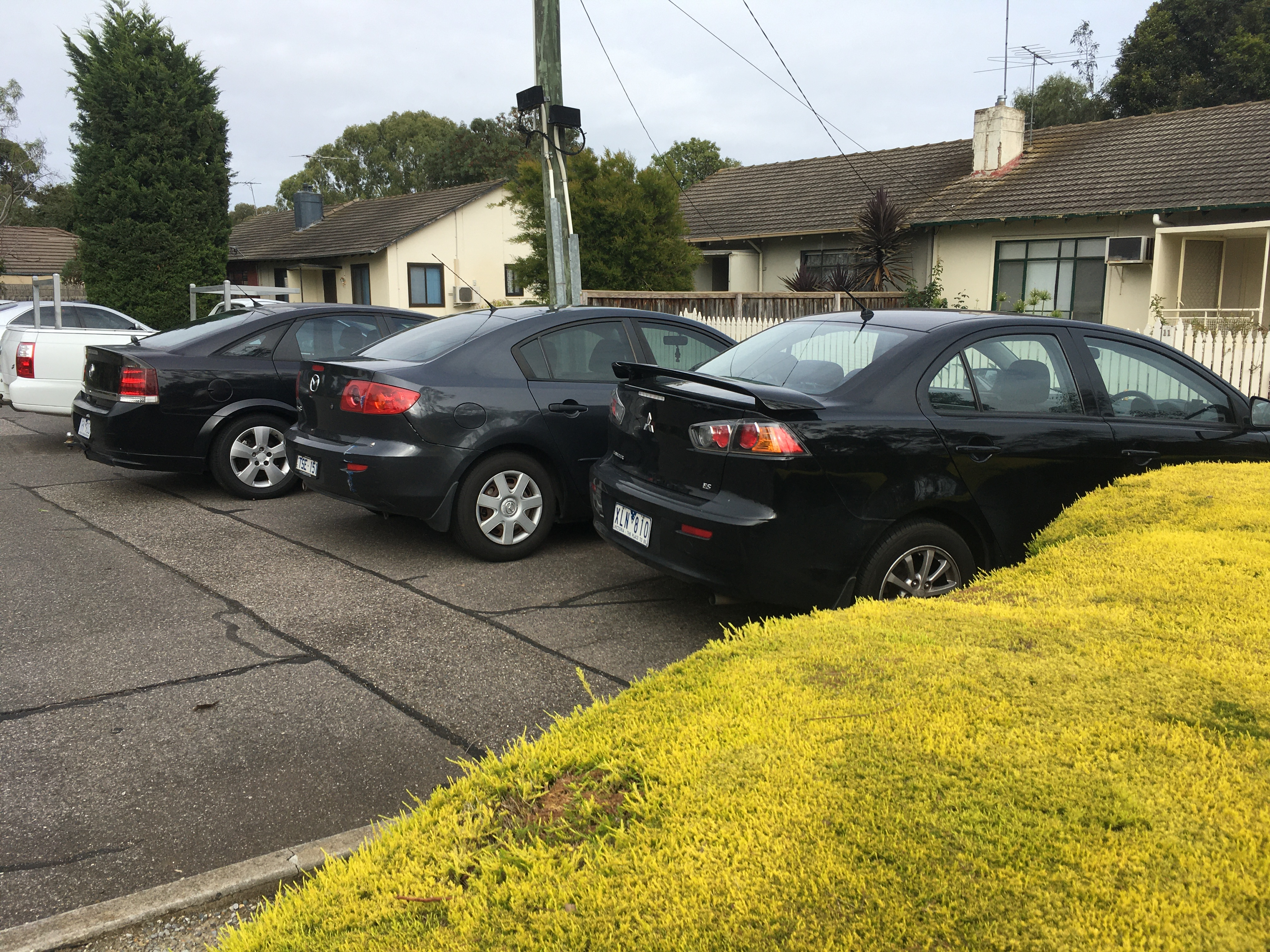
- Melbourne Olympic Village houses, located in Heidelberg West

- Interactive map of Heidelberg West
- Coordinates: 37.744°S 145.047°E
- Country: Australia
- State: Victoria
- City: Melbourne
- LGA: City of Banyule
- Location: 10 km (6.2 mi) from Melbourne

Government
  - State electorate: Ivanhoe
  - Federal division: Jagajaga

Area
  - Total: 3.2 km^{2} (1.2 sq mi)

Population
  - Total: 5,252 (2021 census)
  - Density: 1,641/km^{2} (4,250/sq mi)
- Postcode: 3081
Suburbs around Heidelberg West
Reservoir	Bundoora	Macleod
Preston	Heidelberg West	Heidelberg Heights
Preston	Bellfield	Heidelberg Heights

Heidelberg West is a suburb of Melbourne, Victoria, Australia, 10 km north-east of Melbourne's Central Business District, located within the City of Banyule local government area. Heidelberg West recorded a population of 5,252 at the 2021 census.

== Suburb ==
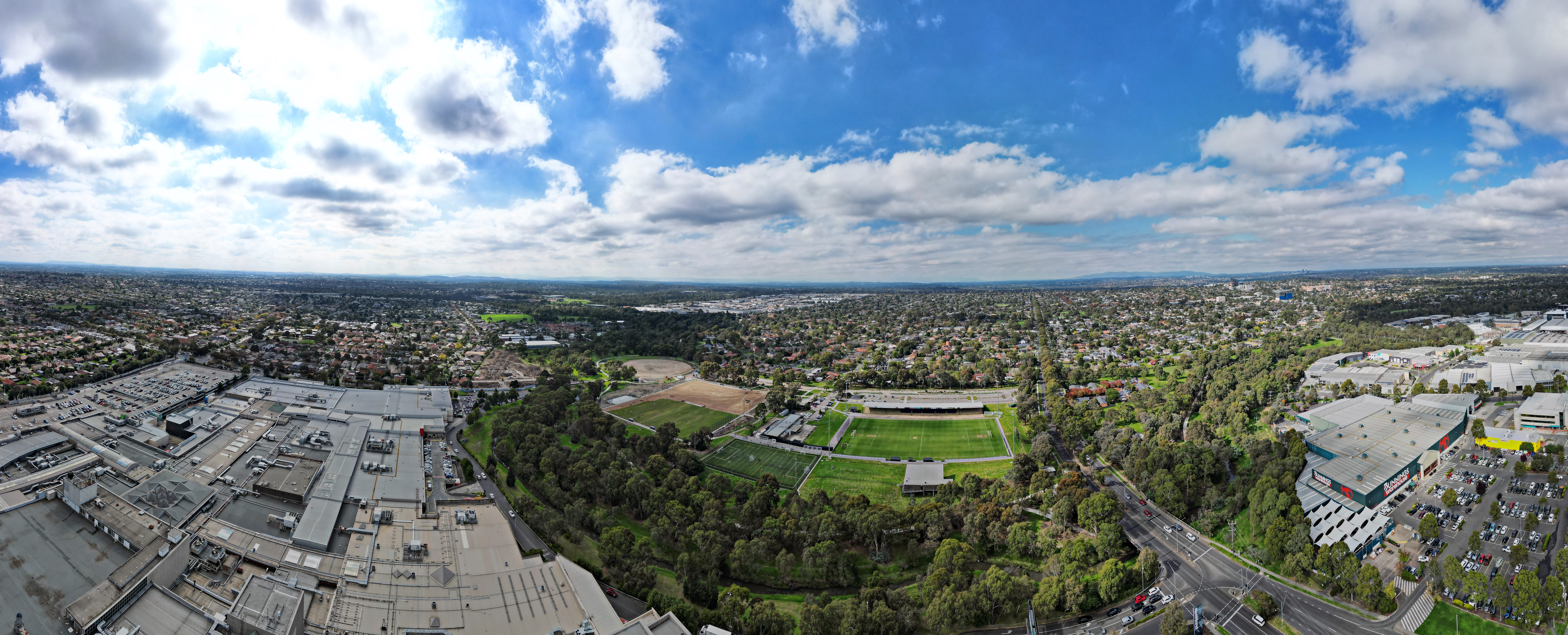
Aerial panorama of the Heidelberg Olympic Village and surrounds. Shot April 2023.

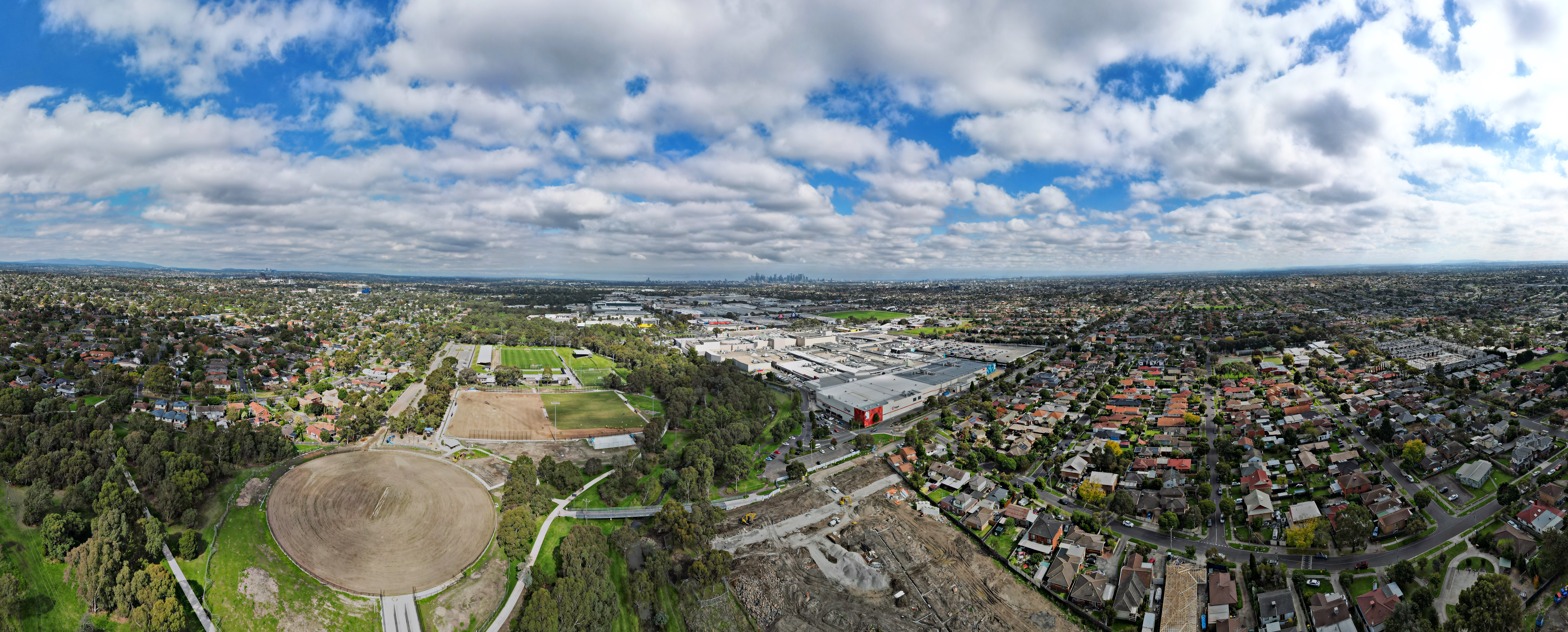
Aerial panorama of Heidelberg West. April 2023.

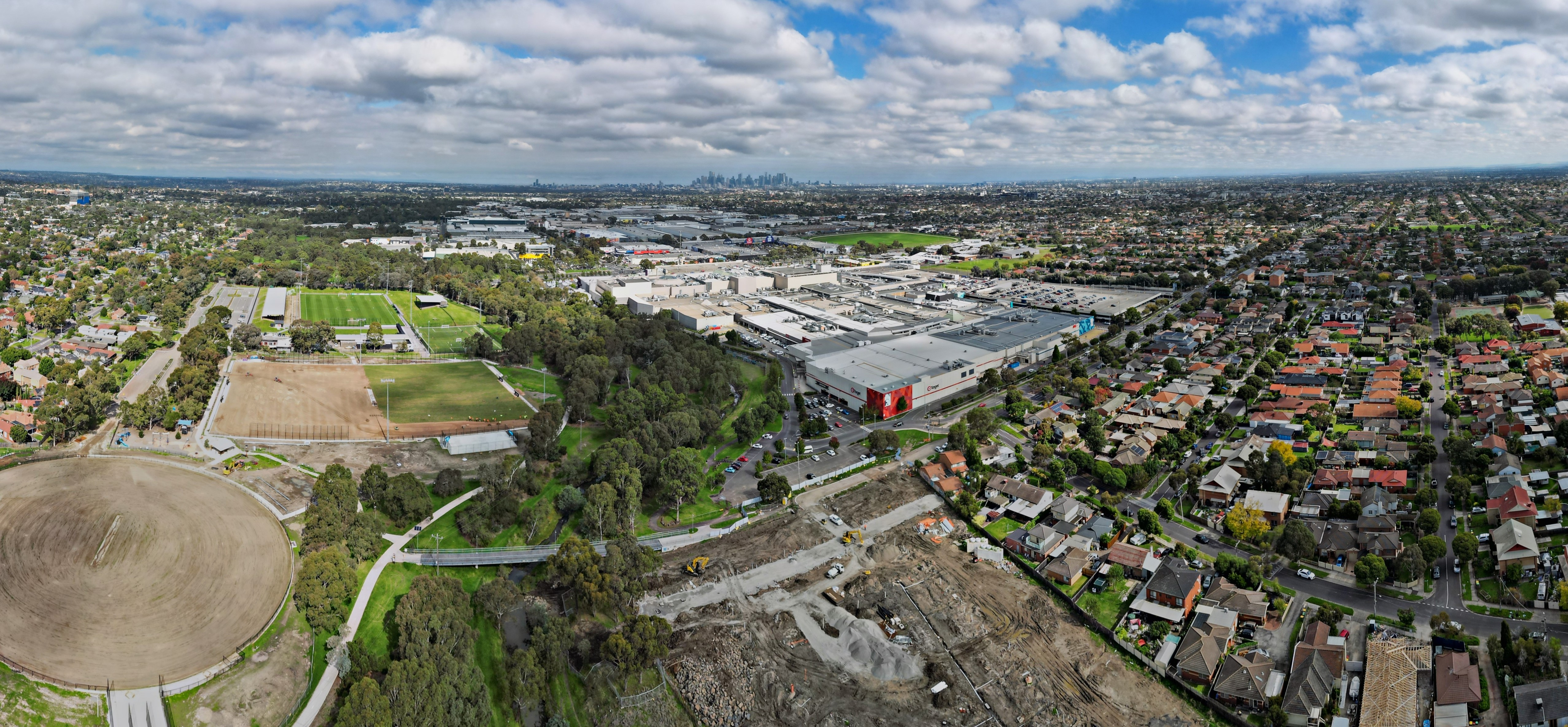
Aerial perspective of Northland Shopping Centre with the Melbourne CBD in the background and Olympic Village sporting grounds. Shot April 2023.

Heidelberg West contains The Mall, an open style shopping centre constructed during the 1950s. The first store opened in The Mall was Dad's Fruit Shop which opened on 4 October 1956 one week before the Olympic Games of the year. The proprietors were Hyman Wisel & David East. The centre is to be redeveloped as a part of the urban renewal plan. Another shopping strip is situated at the end of Bell Street.

Darebin Creek, and its surrounding parklands act as Heidelberg West's main public open space. The urban parts of Heidelberg West consist mostly of medium to low-density housing and development. A mobile library service managed by Yarra Plenty Regional Library visits Heidelberg West every Friday morning.

== History ==
The Heidelberg West Post Office opened on 14 May 1923, and was renamed Heidelberg Heights around 1950. The post office on Oriel Road opened in 1952 but closed in 2025. The Heidelberg Military Hospital office opened in 1941 and was renamed to Heidelberg Repatriation Hospital in 1947.

In 1956, Heidelberg West became the site of the Summer Olympics athlete's village. The village was converted into a Housing Commission of Victoria estate following the conclusion of the games, and in recent years has had properties sold into private hands. In 2006 the suburb was selected for urban renewal by the State Government because of its low socio-economic profile.

== Education ==
Heidelberg West hosts the following educational facilities:

- Audrey Brooks Pre-School
- Olympic Village Primary School
- Northern Melbourne Institute of TAFE
- St Pius X Primary School

Banksia Secondary College and Bellfield Primary School, which was located on Banksia Street, and Haig Street Primary School, in Heidelberg Heights, were the primary education facilities for the area. Both schools have now been closed due to not having enough enrolled students.

== Health care facilities ==
- Banyule Community Health
- Bellfield Medical Centre
- Repatriation campus of the Austin Hospital.

== Recreation ==
- Heidelberg West Football Club, an Australian rules football team, competes in the Northern Football League. It plays its home games at Heidelberg Park in neighbouring Heidelberg
- Olympic Colts Cricket Club affiliated with the North Metro Cricket Association and resides at Olympic Village Reserve, Catalina Street, West Heidelberg. Formed in 1991/92 from the merger of Olympic Youth Cricket Club and Heidelberg Colts Cricket Club
- Heidelberg United Football Club moved into the training facility in 1979 and still resides there today. The Heidelberg United Football Club competes and plays out of the stadium arena in the Victorian Premier League
- The Heidelberg West Cricket Club currently competes in the North Metro Cricket Association based at Heidelberg Park

== See also ==
- List of Olympic Villages
