= Banksia Latrobe Secondary College =

Coordinates: 37°45′21″S 145°02′21.1″E

- Heidelberg West, Victoria; Australia

Information
- Type: Public, co-educational, secondary, day school
- Established: 1954
- Closed: 2011
- Years: 7 to 12
- Colours: Blue and maroon
- Website: Banksia Latrobe Secondary College

Banksia Latrobe Secondary College was a public, co-educational high school located in Heidelberg West, Victoria, Australia. It was closed at the end of 2011, being replaced by Charles La Trobe College. From the 1980s, it underwent a large transformation and a series of amalgamations.

== History ==
Heidelberg High School was opened in 1956. The nearby Heidelberg Technical School was opened in 1955. Heidelberg Girls' High School was opened in 1957, and Rosanna High School opened soon after. As a result of declining enrolments in the area, due to an ageing population, amalgamations occurred, which saw Heidelberg Girls' HS become Waterdale High School and Rosanna High School become Latrobe High School. Eventually, Waterdale High School closed, and in 1989, Heidelberg High School amalgamated with Heidelberg Technical School and Latrobe High School to become Banksia Secondary College. The college was refurbished and re-opened on the old Heidelberg High School site in 1991.

In 1984, a Deaf Facility was established at Heidelberg High School as a pilot project. It commenced in Term Two with Teachers of the Deaf, Interpreters, Notetakers, and 14 Deaf students. These students came from various settings throughout the state including Victorian College for the Deaf, Glendonald School for the Deaf and students on Visiting Teacher Services.

2008 saw Latrobe Secondary College (formerly Macleod Technical School) amalgamate with Banksia Secondary College (formerly Heidelberg High School) to form Banksia Latrobe Secondary College.

In 2011 the school was closed and in 2012 the City of Banyule acquired part of the former Banksia LaTrobe Secondary College in Bellfield to allow for high-end residential infill development and also enable revenue to be generated for Council. The Bellfield Urban Design Guidelines were developed and adopted by Council in February 2019.
