= Henry R. Bastow =

Australian architect (1839–1920)

Henry Bastow
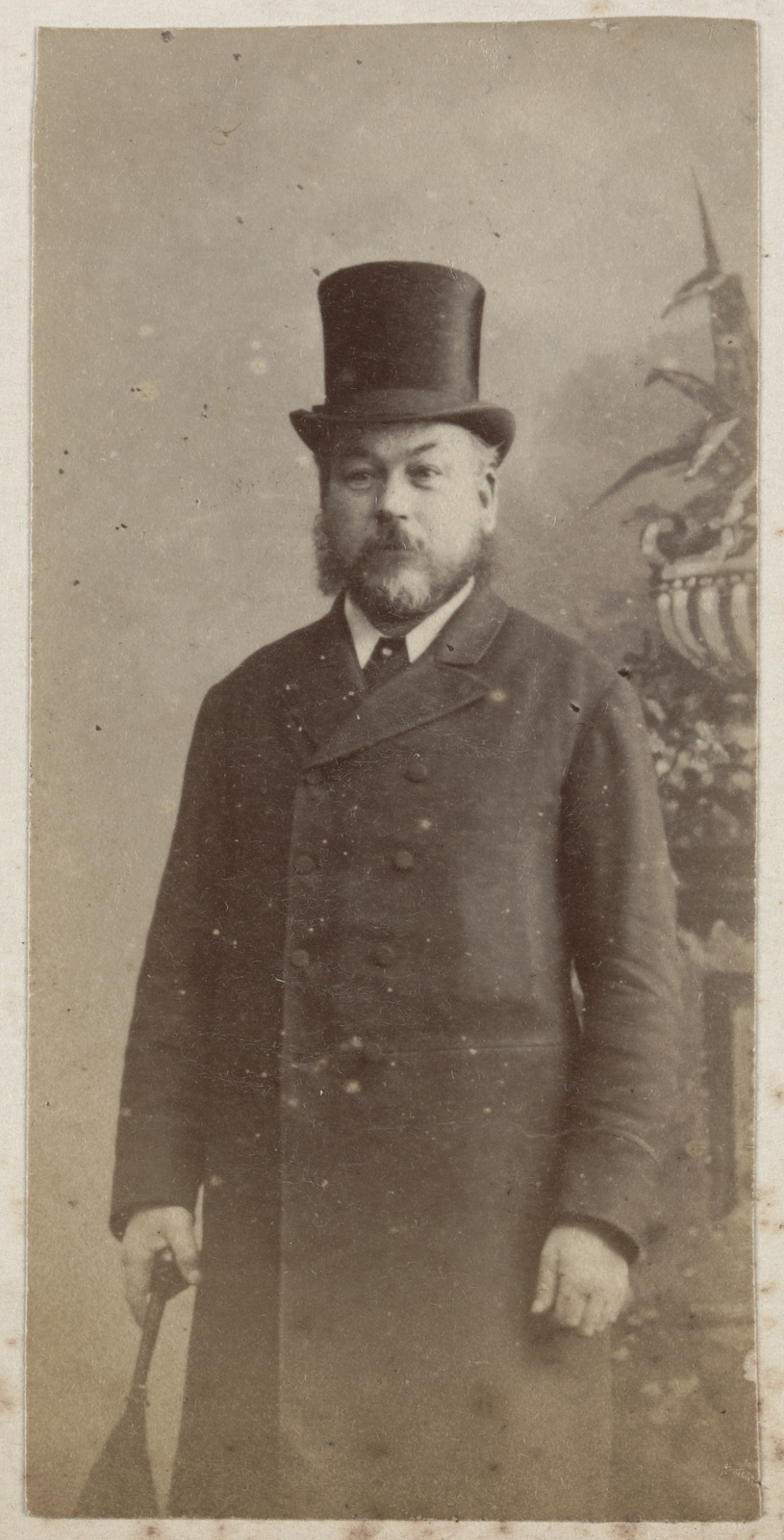
- Henry Bastow in 1888
- Born: Henry Robert Bastow; 1839; Bridport, England
- Died: 30 September 1920 (aged 80–81)
- Occupation: Architect
- Spouse: Eliza Litchfield (m. 1867)
- Practice: Victorian Department of Education; Public Works Department in Victoria
- Design: Victorian Gothic Revival schools

Henry Robert Bastow (1839 – 30 September 1920) was an Australian architect, known for overseeing the design and construction of over 600 schools for the new Victorian Department of Education in the 1870s and 1880s. He was also a leading member of the Plymouth Brethren in Melbourne, Victoria.

== Background and career ==
Born in Bridport, England, Bastow studied architecture in nearby Dorchester, at the same time as Thomas Hardy, later a noted author, was apprenticed to local architect John Hicks.

In about 1860, he emigrated to Tasmania, where he won a competition for a new Hobart Town Hall in 1861 (not built). In 1866 he moved north to Melbourne, Victoria and became a draughtsman with the Victorian Water Supply Department, and later, architect and civil engineer with the Railways Department.

He returned to Tasmania in 1867 to marry Eliza Litchfield, daughter of a previous Hobart mayor.

Following the passing of the Education Act in 1872, which provided for free, compulsory and secular primary school education in Victoria, hundreds of schools were required. Bastow was appointed Architect and Surveyor of the newly formed Education Department, responsible for their design and construction.

In 1873, a competition was held for designs for schools of different sizes, from which a number were awarded prizes. Few of these designs were built exactly as submitted, instead they were adapted the to differing sizes and sites, with new details added over time, building a repertoire of designs. It is not known exactly how closely involved Bastow was with each design, and all drawings are signed by draftsmen within the office rather than Bastow himself, but he would have guided and approved the designs.

Nearly all the early schools were in a similar Victorian Gothic Revival style, usually picturesque, but some symmetrical, with walls of face brick, in brown or red brick, a few in bluestone, with highlights in contrasting brickwork, low pointed arch windows, steep slate roofs, prominent gables, some with jerkinhead roofs, and a prominent bell tower, usually over the entrance. A range of much smaller, simpler rural schools, sometimes in timber, were also designed. Schools of the later 1870s and the 1880s were more elaborate, with polychrome brickwork, Gothic traceried windows and prominent towers, some with a more Queen Anne or Tudor character. By the early 1880s, the department had built over 600 schools across Victoria, and a large majority are still functioning as schools. At least 25 of the schools designed under Bastow are listed on the Victorian Heritage Register.

In 1883, the architecture branch of the Education Department became part of the Public Works Department, and Bastow became a senior architect within the department, working on a wider variety of public buildings, as well as schools. In 1886 Bastow became the chief Government Architect of the Public Works Department in Victoria, a position he held until 1890. In the later years of his tenure, the architects of the Public Works Department produced designs in a wider range of styles than earlier decades, which were marked by simplicity and restraint.

== Latter years ==
Following his departure from that position, he retired from public life to central Victoria, built a simple home equipped with a meeting room for his Brethren fellows, and became an apple orchardist.

He continued a correspondence with Thomas Hardy on personal and religious matters.

== Gallery ==
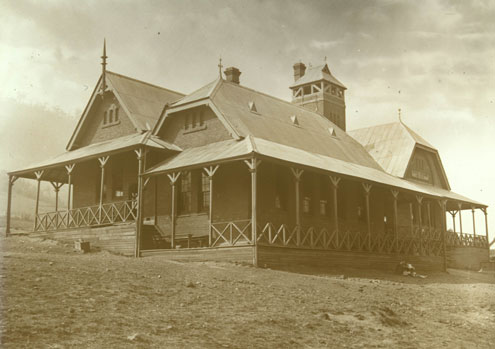
Wandiligong State School 1877

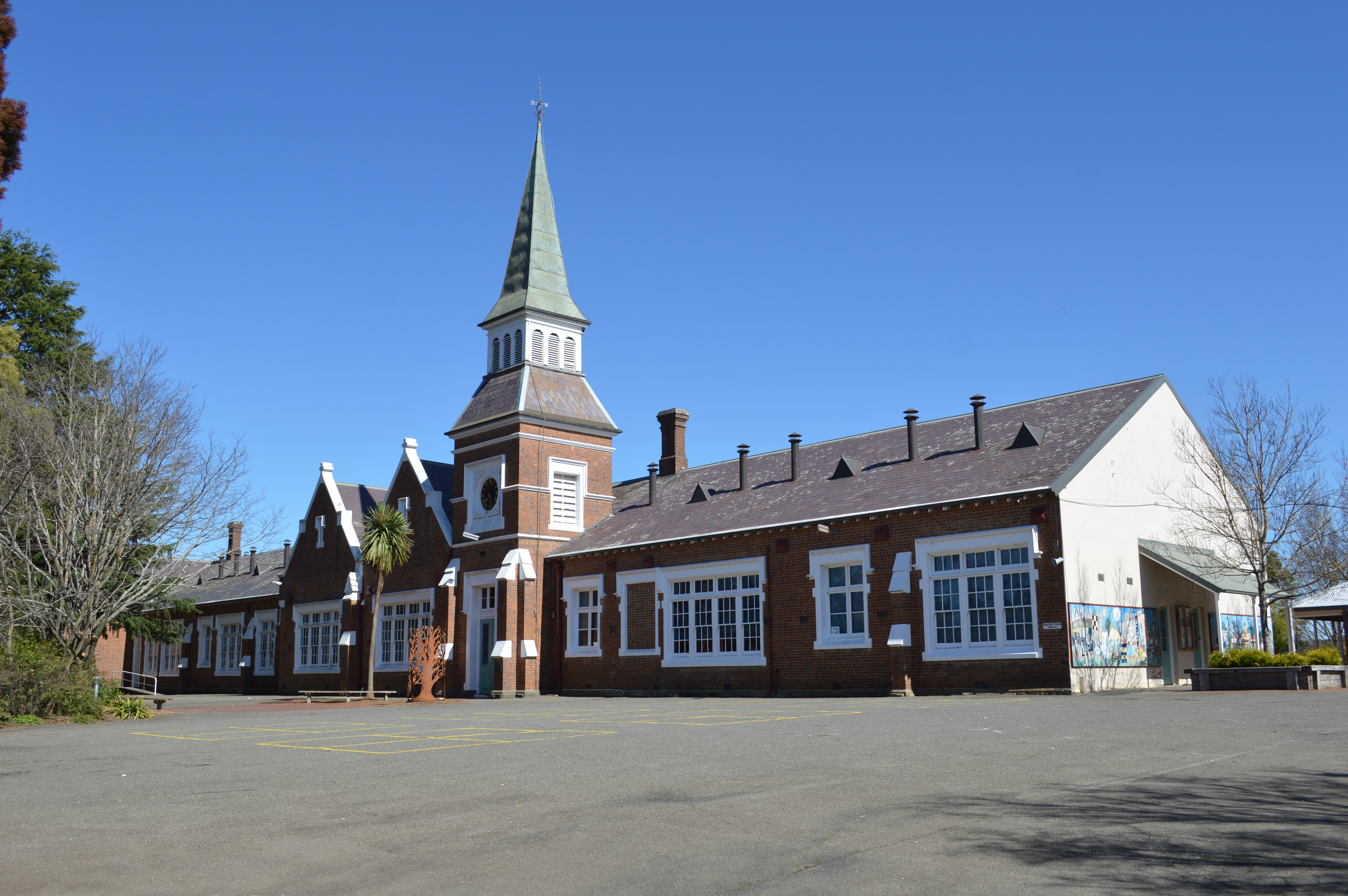
Daylesford State School 1877

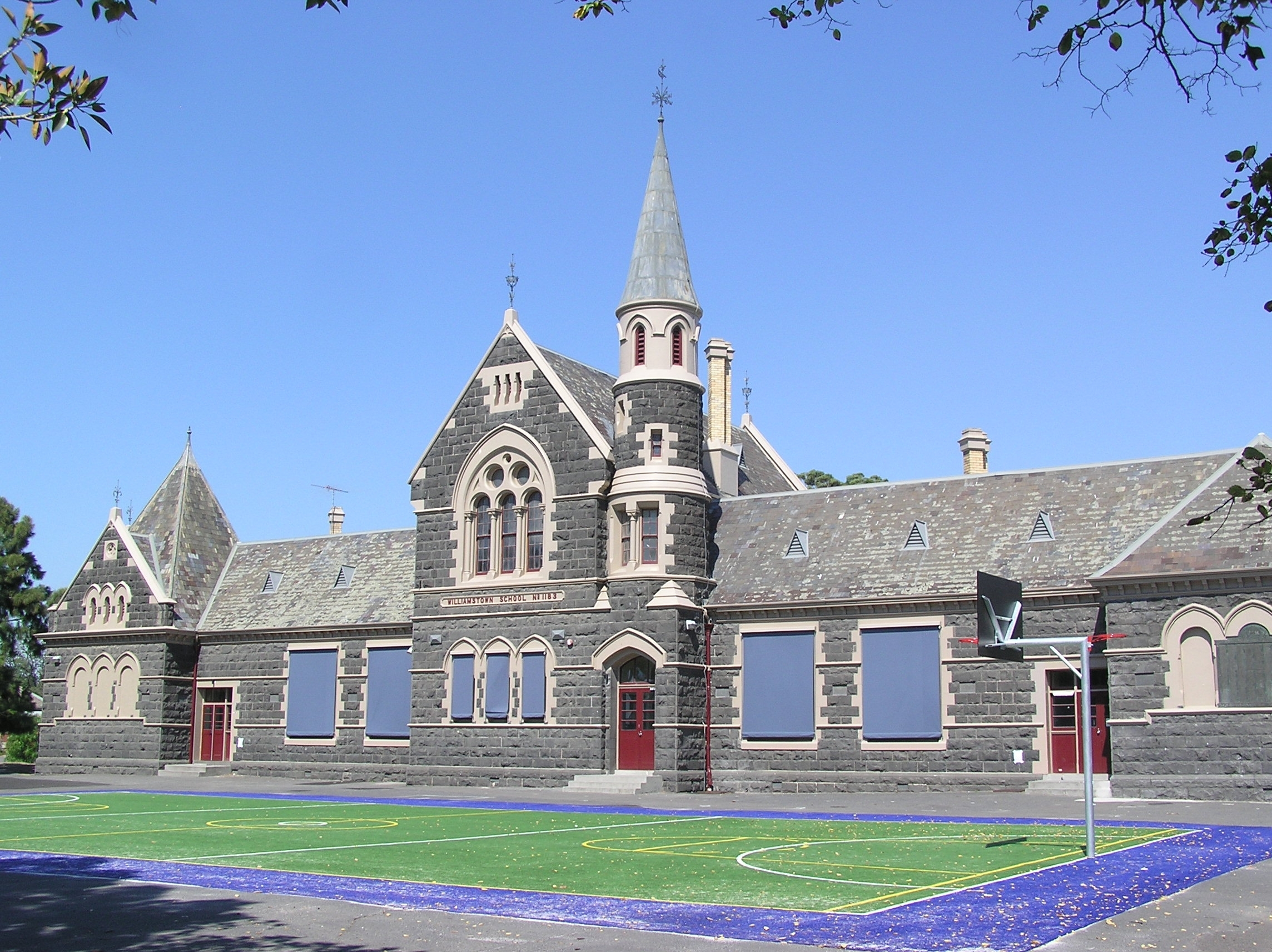
Williamstown State School 1878, a design executed in bluestone

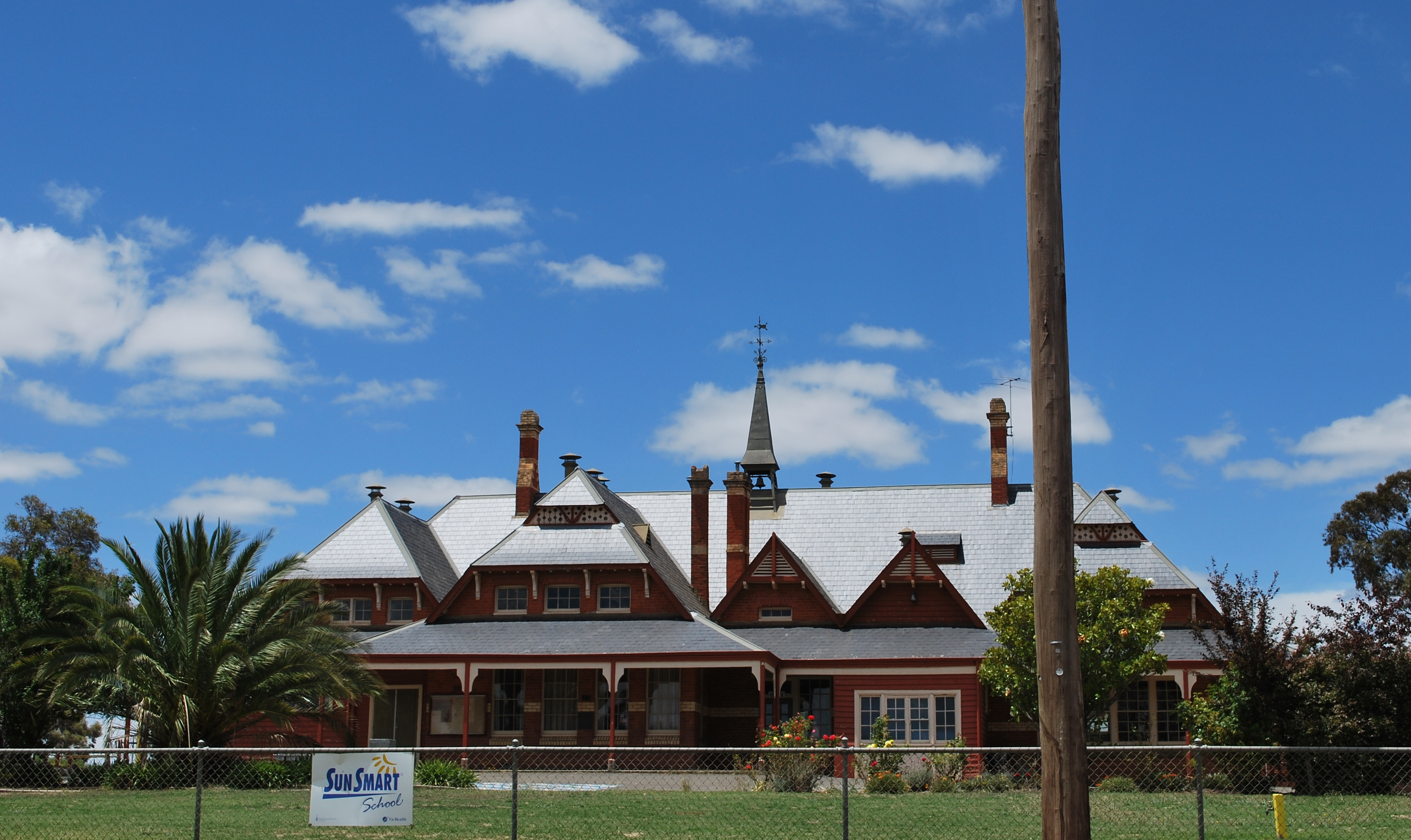
Avoca State School 1878

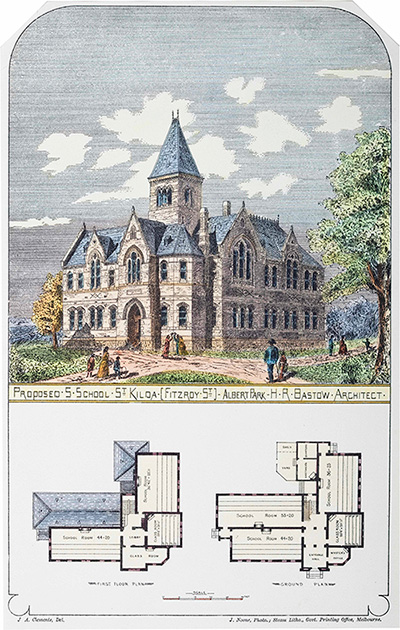
St kilda State School design 1879

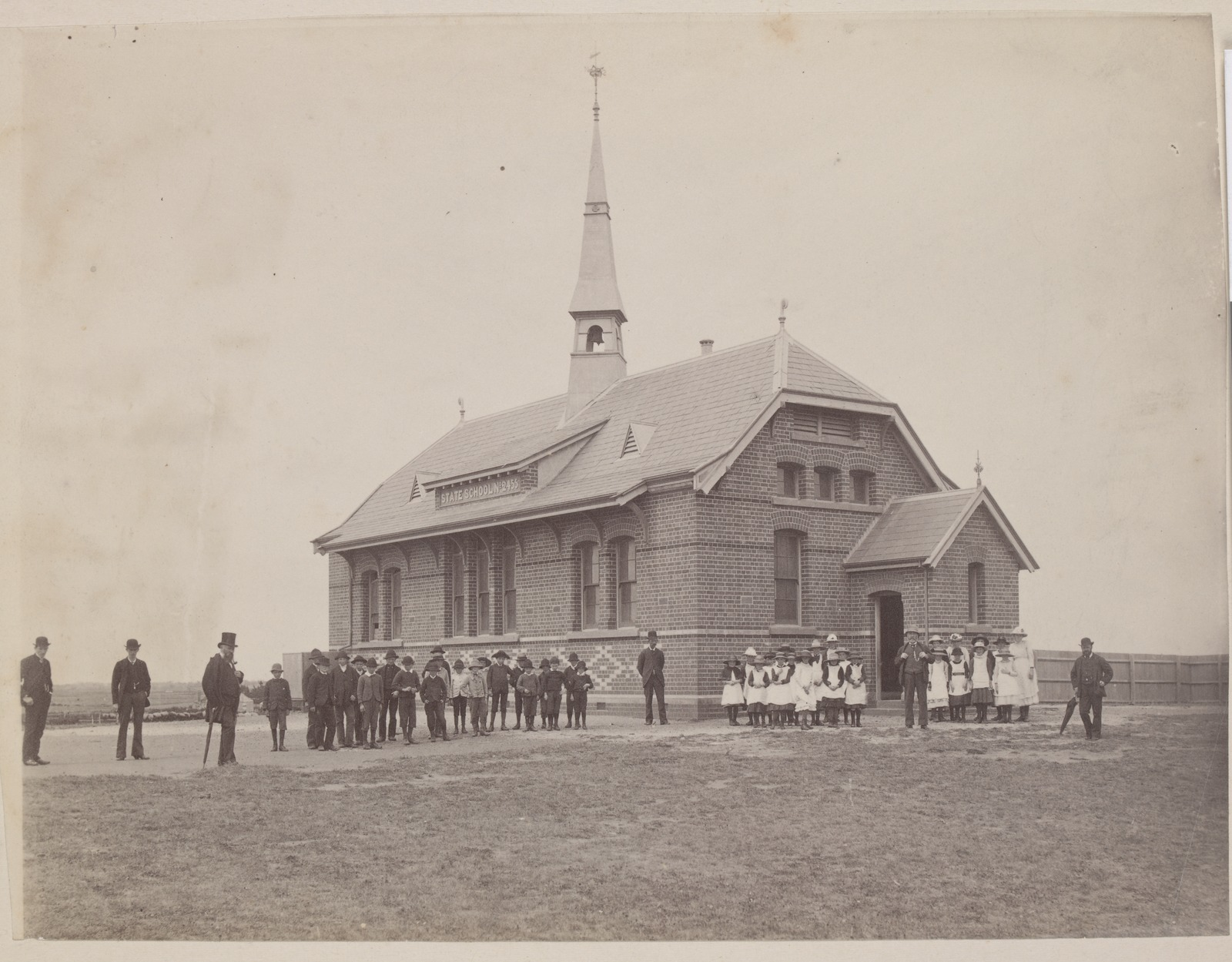
Portarlington State School 1882

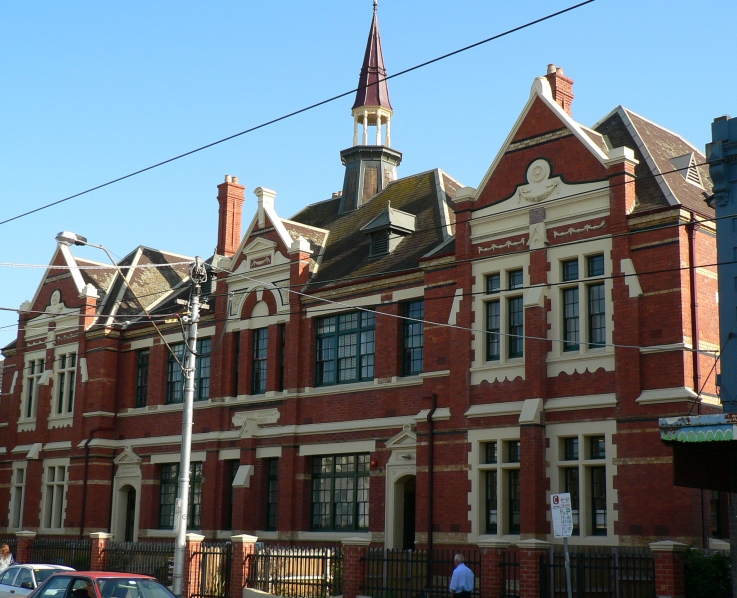
Prahran State School 1888, a rare Queen Anne design
