= Richard McSherry =

American physician

Richard McSherry (November 21, 1817 – October 7, 1885) was an American medical doctors, one of the founders of the Baltimore Academy of Medicine and its first president.

== Life ==
Born on November 21, 1817, in Martisburg, Virginia, he studied at Georgetown College and at the University of Maryland, and received the degree of M. D. at the University of Pennsylvania in 1841. Being appointed assistant surgeon on the medical corps of the U.S. Army on 21 August 1838, he served under General Zachary Taylor in the Second Seminole War and resigned his commission on 30 April 1840.

From 1843 to 1856 he served as assistant surgeon in the U.S. Navy, and after that practised medicine in Baltimore until 1883. He died there on 7 October 1885.

== Works ==
He contributed to medical journals, and was also the author of "El Puchero or a Mixed Dish from Mexico" (1850); "Essays" (1869), and "Health and How to Promote It" (1883).

== Family ==
He was the son of Dr. Richard McSherry and Catherine Ann (King) McSherry. He married Catherine Somerville Wilson, daughter of Robert Wilson of Baltimore, in 1842.
