= John H. B. Latrobe =

American lawyer (1803–1891)

John Hazelhurst Boneval Latrobe
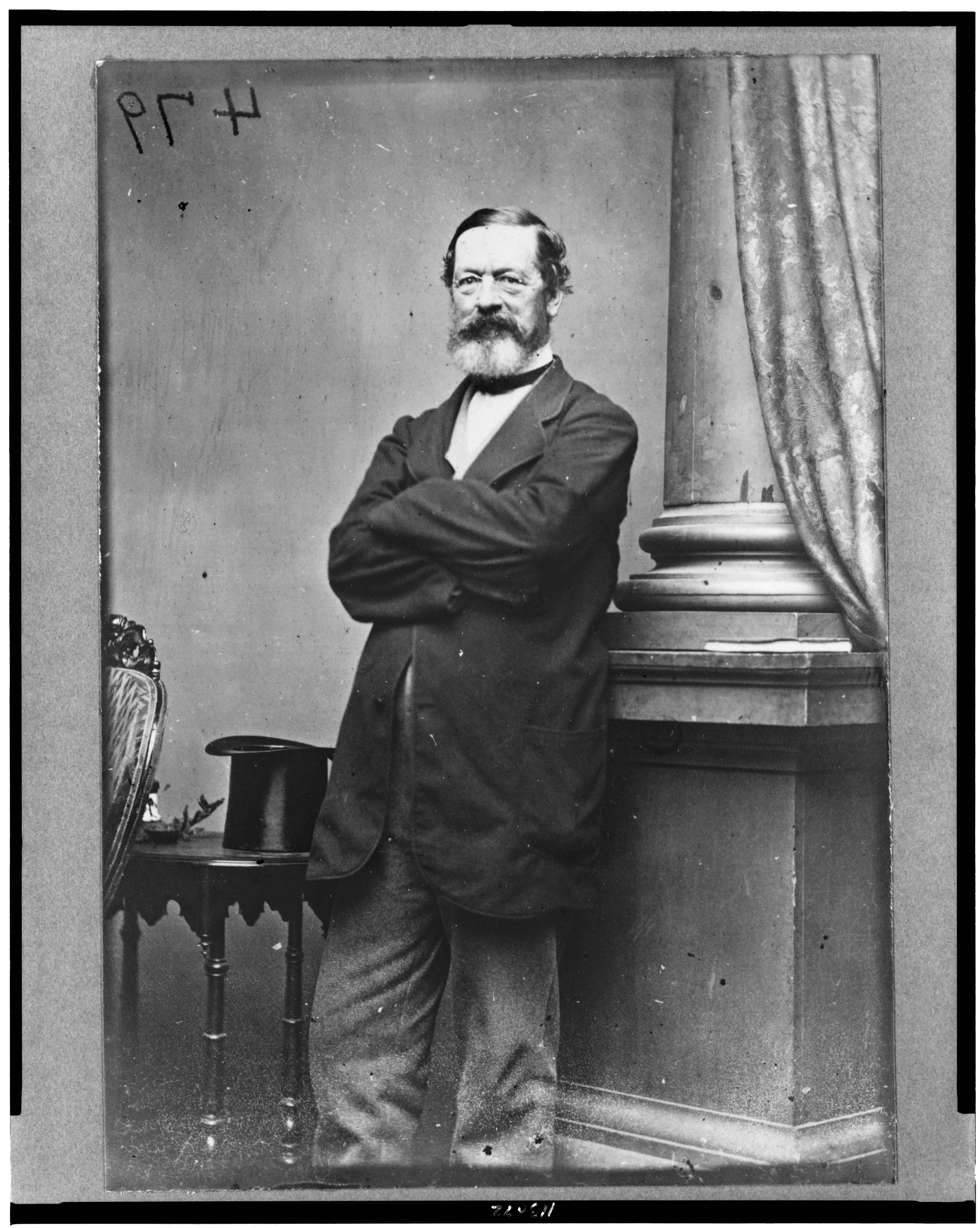
- John H. B. Latrobe (1860)
- Born: May 4, 1803; Philadelphia, Pennsylvania, U.S.
- Died: September 11, 1891 (aged 88); Baltimore, Maryland, U.S.
- Resting place: Green Mount Cemetery; Baltimore, Maryland, U.S.
- Known for: Inventing the Latrobe Stove
- Spouses: Margaret Caile Steuart (m. 1828; died 1831) Charlotte Virginia Claiborne (m. 1832)
- Children: 8, including Ferdinand C. Latrobe
- Father: Benjamin Henry Latrobe
- Relatives: Benjamin Henry Latrobe II (brother)

John Hazlehurst Boneval Latrobe (May 4, 1803 – September 11, 1891) was an American lawyer and inventor. He invented the Latrobe Stove, also known as the "Baltimore Heater", a coal fired parlor heater made of cast iron and that fit into fireplaces as an insert. He patented his design in 1846. The squat stoves were very popular by the 1870s and were much smaller than Benjamin Franklin's Franklin stove.

== Personal life ==
John Hazlehurst Boneval Latrobe was born on May 4, 1803, in Philadelphia, Pennsylvania, to Mary Elizabeth (née Hazelhurst) and Benjamin Henry Latrobe. His father was a noted engineer and architect. John Latrobe secured an appointment to the U.S. Military Academy at West Point, New York, where he studied engineering (1818-1821). However, he ultimately decided to become a lawyer, and returned to Baltimore after his father's death to read law under the director of Robert Goodloe Harper. He married twice. He married his first wife, Margaret Caile Steuart (1795-1831) on November 29, 1828. She had one son, Henry Boneval Latrobe (1830-1877) before her death. He remarried in Natchez, Mississippi on December 6, 1832, in Natchez, Louisiana, to Charlotte Virginia Claiborne, (1815-1903) who would survive him and also bear seven children.

== Career ==
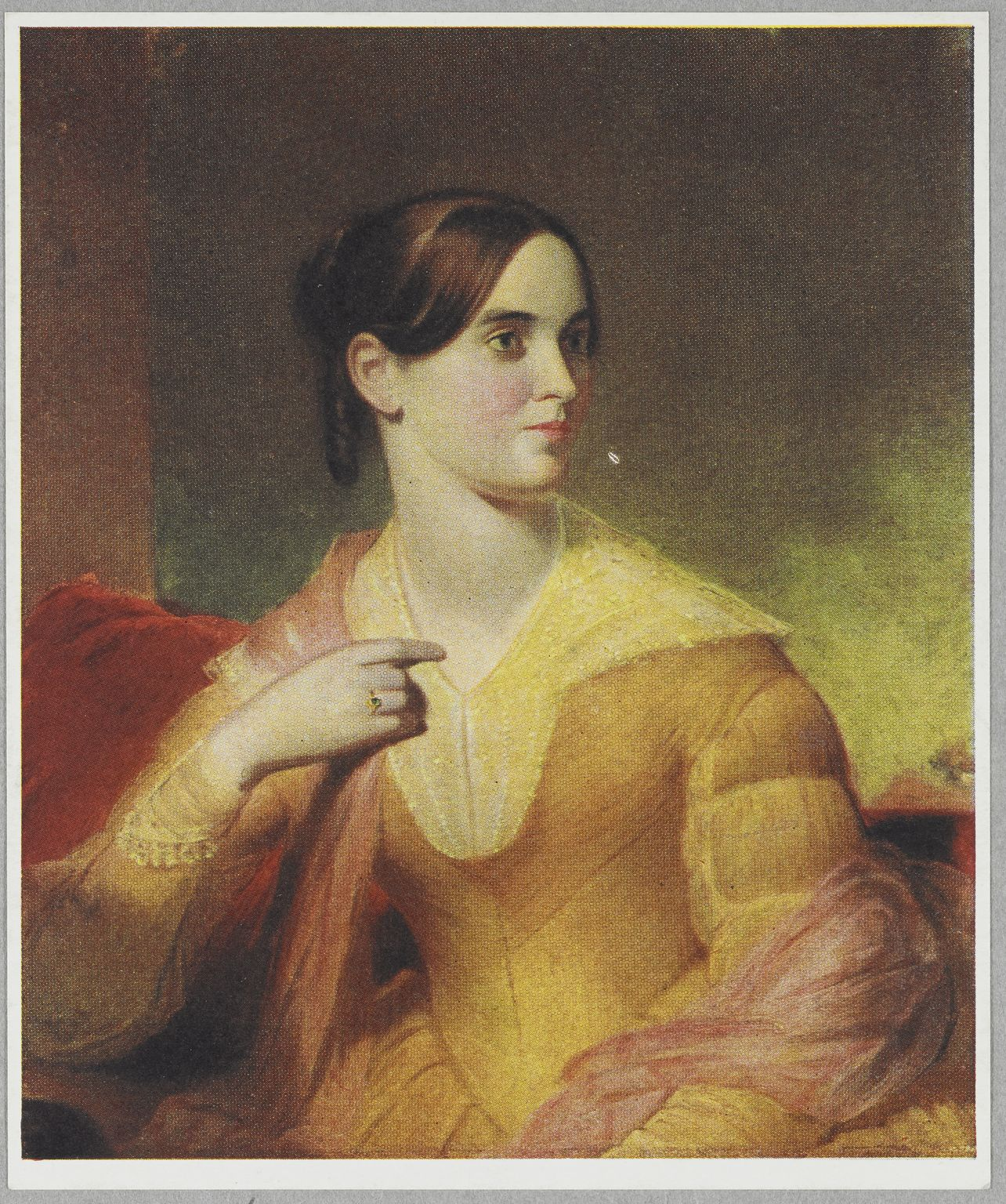
Charlotte Virginia Claiborne Latrobe, portrait by William Edward West

A lawyer after admission to the Maryland bar, this Latrobe initially practiced with his younger brother, Benjamin Henry Latrobe II, until the younger Latrobe decided to concentrate on civil engineering, as had their father. John H.B. Latrobe became a lawyer for the Baltimore and Ohio Railroad, initially arranging for land acquisitions (and publishing a work about conveyancing in 1826). Latrobe wrote the dedication speech of President Thomas at the railroad's July 4, 1828 dedication. He later incorporated its telegraph service and became its chief counsel for decades. He would negotiate with the Choctaw, Chickasaw and other tribes, as well travel to Russia before the American Civil War to negotiate financing.

In 1854, Latrobe was elected as a member to the American Philosophical Society.

As a patent lawyer, Latrobe was reluctant to take credit for his stoves, believing being known as an inventor of stoves would damage his legal reputation. Over 300,000 of the stoves were in use by 1878, although in recent decades, antique stoves such as the Latrobe are collected but rarely used for their original purpose, being more often used as decoration or as planters. In 1871 he delivered a lecture on the history of the steamboat which explained the contribution of Nicholas Roosevelt, who had married his elder half-sister Lydia Sellon Latrobe.

Latrobe was a long-time supporter of the effort to establish a home in Africa for emancipated slaves. Succeeding Senator Henry Clay, Latrobe served as president of the American Colonization Society from 1853 until his death in 1891. He also helped found the Maryland Historical Society, of which he was president, and the American Bar Association. Latrobe gave a speech about history of the Mason–Dixon line to the Historical Society of Pennsylvania in 1854 which was widely reprinted, and also helped found Druid Hill Park, serving on its board of directors from 1860 until his death. Latrobe also achieved some distinction as a poet and painter, and was one of the 3-judge panels which awarded Edgar Allan Poe a prize for his "Manuscript in a bottle", which was published in Baltimore's Sunday Visitor paper and helped launch the writer's career.

== Death and legacy ==
Latrobe died on September 11, 1891, and was buried with other family members in Green Mount Cemetery in Baltimore. Latrobe donated his family's papers, including an autobiography he wrote, to the Maryland State Archives, which continue to maintain them. A biography of him published in 1917 remains accessible through the Internet archive. His Baltimore home continues to stand across from Baltimore's Catholic Basilica, which his father had designed (and he may have helped design the facing portico).

His son Ferdinand C. Latrobe (1833–1911) became a lawyer and author like his father, served in the Maryland legislature, and was elected Baltimore's mayor seven times.
