= Charles La Trobe College =

Coordinates: 37°45′21″S 145°02′21.1″E

Charles La Trobe P–12 College

Location
- Macleod West, Victoria; Australia

Information
- Type: Public
- Established: 2011
- Principal: Andrew Robertson
- Years: P–12
- Colour(s): Yellow & grey
- Website: charleslatrobecollege.vic.edu.au

Charles La Trobe P–12 College is a public, co-educational high school in Macleod, Victoria, Australia. It opened in 2011, the result of a merger between Banksia La Trobe Secondary College, Bellfield Primary School, Haig Street Primary School and Olympic Village Primary School.

== About the school ==
Charles La Trobe College is 13 kilometres north-east of Melbourne's CBD. The school conducts classes over 13 year levels, from Foundation to Year 12. It consists of four Campuses:

- La Trobe Campus in Macleod West Catering for Foundation to Year 12
- Olympic Village Primary School in Heidelberg West for Foundation to Year 6
- The Pavilion School in Preston East
- The Pavilion School in Epping at Melbourne Polytechnic

Charles La Trobe P–12 College employs over 160 staff, and provides qualifications in the Victorian Certificate of Education (VCE), the Victorian Certificate of Applied Learning (VCAL) and numerous Vocational Education and Training (VET) qualifications through student enrolment in the North Melbourne VET Cluster.

== Quantum Victoria ==
Funded by the Department of Education, Quantum Victoria is one of six state Science and Mathematics Specialist Centres. Quantum Victoria provides onsite and remote synchronous and asynchronous learning programs in Science, Technology, Engineering and Mathematics (STEM) Education for students in years Foundation to Year 12. These programs are commonly run as day-long modules and are planned using the Victorian Curriculum.

The Center operates within the La Trobe Campus of Charles La Trobe P–12 College and provides STEM programs to both Charles La Trobe P–12 College students and Government, Independent and Catholic schools within the state of Victoria. In 2020, the centre provided educational programs for over 80,000 Victorian school students.

== The Pavilion School ==
The Pavilion School is a proud Victorian Government School that seeks to provide the highest standard of public education for adolescents who have been disengaged or excluded from mainstream education.

The Pavilion School provides holistic support to students, offering an intensive literacy, numeracy and personal development program. Support includes counselling, referrals to other agencies and pathways support. The Pavilion School staff members provide a flexible, individualised form of education that maintains a strict adherence to both the Victorian Essential Learning Strands as well as the Victorian Certificate of Applied Learning.

== Deaf Facility ==
In 1984, the Deaf Facility was established at Heidelberg High School as a pilot project. It commenced in Term Two with Teachers of the Deaf, Interpreters, Notetakers, and 14 Deaf students. These students came from various settings throughout the state including Victorian College for the Deaf, Glendonald School for the Deaf and students on Visiting Teacher Services. Students travelled from all over Melbourne and country Victoria, and due to the success of this facility; other primary and secondary facilities have been established throughout Victoria.
