= Mount Eagle Estate =

Heritage-listed real estate subdivision in Melbourne, Victoria, Australia

- Location of the estate in Greater Metropolitan Melbourne
- Interactive map of the Mount Eagle Estate area

General information
- Status: Completed
- Type: Real estate subdivision
- Architectural style: Garden suburb
- Location: Eaglemont, City of Banyule, Melbourne, Victoria, Australia
- Coordinates: 37°46′05″S 145°03′40″E
- Completed: 1914; 112 years ago

Design and construction
- Architects: Walter Burley Griffin; Marion Mahony Griffin
- Developer: Peter Keam

Victorian Heritage Register
- Official name: Mount Eagle Estate
- Type: Registered place
- Designated: 28 December 2006
- Reference no.: H2104
- Heritage overlay no.: HO127
- Categories: Parks, Gardens and Trees; Urban Area

The Mount Eagle Estate, or more simply, Mount Eagle or Eaglemont Estate, is a garden suburb real estate subdivision located in Eaglemont, in the City of Banyule, in the northern suburbs of Melbourne, in Victoria, Australia. The estate comprises houses, streets, and parks located on Outlook Drive, Summit Drive, Burley Griffin Place, Lower Heidelberg Road, The Eyrie, and Maltravers Road, in Eaglemont.

Developed from 1914 on the traditional lands of the Wurundjeri people, the estate was added to the Victorian Heritage Register on 28 December 2006 in recognition of its historical and aesthetic significance; and was also added to a non-statutory list by the City of Banyule on an unknown date.

== History ==
In 1906 the Mount Eagle Estate, formerly a dairy farm, was purchased by New Zealand-born Peter Ernest Keam MBE (1874–1946), an engineer and grazier. His 152-acre (62 ha) property extended from Heidelberg Road and Banksia Street to the Yarra River, which he subdivided gradually over the following years into smaller allotments.

Keam was a founding member of the Town Planning Association of Victoria, established 1914. He commissioned Prairie School architects, Walter Burley Griffin and his wife, Marion, who, in 1912, won an international design competition for Australia's capital city, Canberra. The Griffin's first real estate subdivision design for Keam was the Mount Eagle Estate, completed in 1914.

The following year, Keam commissioned the Griffins to plan the Glenard Estate, located adjacent to the Mount Eagle Estate. Mount Eagle shares many attributes with the nearby Glenard Estate, and the initial sale of the Glenard lots was considered a success.

The setting of the Mount Eagle Estate, Eaglemont is of historical significance for its association with the famous Heidelberg School of impressionist painting which originated in the area, whose members included Tom Roberts (1856-1931), Charles Conder (1868-1909), Arthur Streeton (1867-1943), and Frederick McCubbin (1855-1917). Many of their most significant works were painted in the Heidelberg and Eaglemont area in 1889 and 1890 when Streeton was living in an old cottage, now demolished, which was on what is now Summit Drive on the Mount Eagle Estate. It was at this cottage that Streeton and his fellow artists planned the 9 by 5 Impressionists Painting Exhibition held in Melbourne on 17 August 1889.

== Description ==
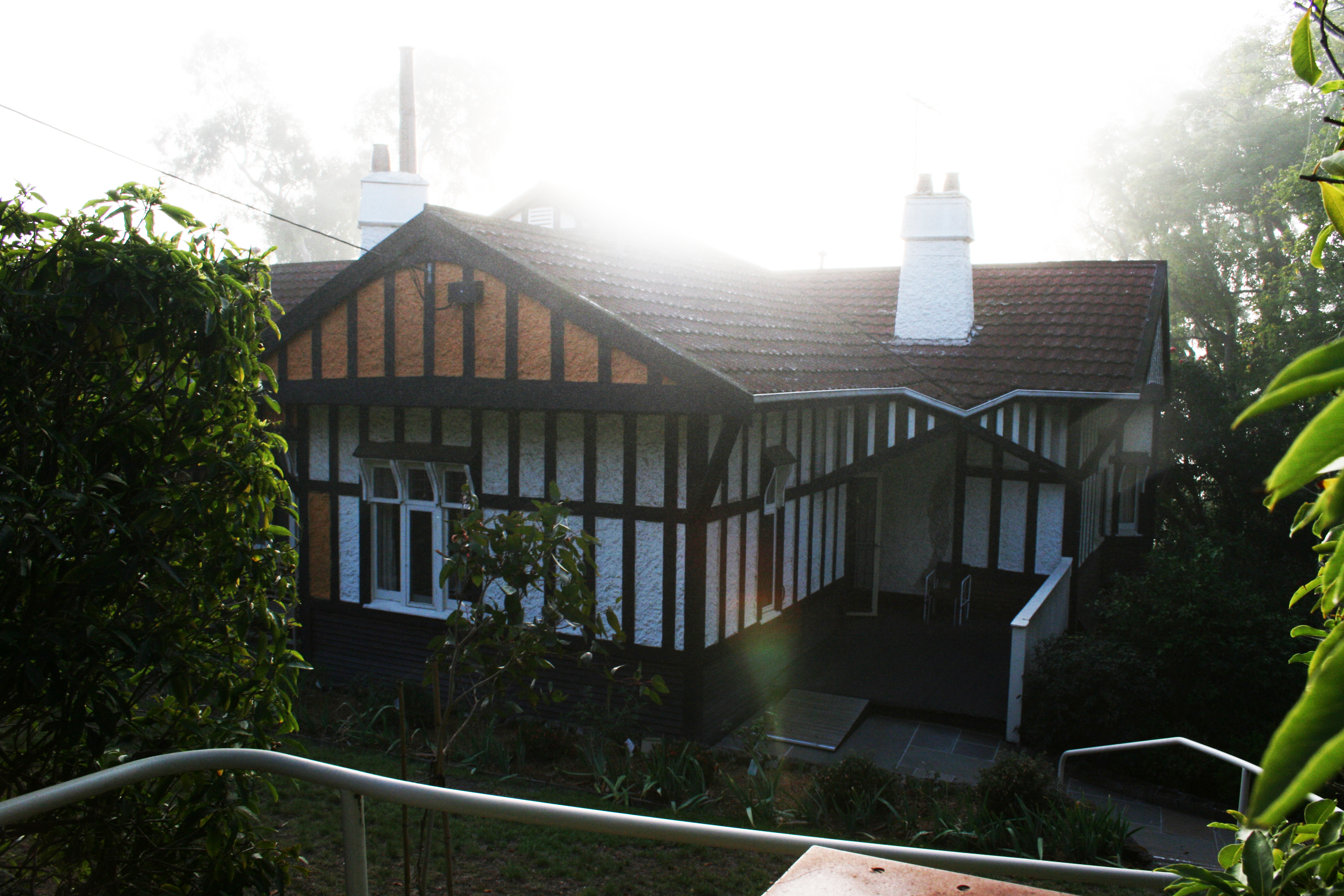
The Desbrowe-Annear house, an Arts and Crafts-style house, built in 1904, within the estate

The Griffins advocated garden city planning and the idea of a neighbourhood as a physical and social planning unit. Besides the Mount Eagle and Glenard estates, other significant urban designs in Australia by the Griffins include Canberra, in the Australian Capital Territory, until his resignation in 1920; the New South Wales towns of Leeton and Griffith, both in 1914; the Sydney suburb of Castlecrag, in 1924; and in Victoria, a partially-realised estate in Croydon Hills in 1921, the Ranelagh Estate, on the Mornington Peninsula in 1926, and Milleara Estate in Avondale Heights in 1927–1928, also partially-realised. The Griffins also designed many individual houses and buildings in Australia.

In their design of the Mount Eagle Estate, they took account of the topography of the site and its native vegetation, as well as existing exotic plantings dating from the 1860s. They provided safe internal public spaces within the estate to cater for community needs. The subdivision layouts and internal reserves of Glenard are early examples of the Griffins' suburban design approach in Victoria.

The Mount Eagle Estate consisted of 145 lots in 1914. The curvilinear streets followed the contours of the site, so that views were obtained from each allotment, and internal reserves for safe community use reflected the Griffins' principles. The public reserves did not take up valuable street frontages but instead used land made spare by the irregular plan. The reserves together with the unfenced back gardens recommended by the Griffins were intended to provide common playing space for children, safe from motor traffic and easily supervised. The Griffins argued that suburbia should provide 'playing grounds for the children so they can grow up healthy and vigorous under as nearly as possible open country natural conditions'. The subdivision layouts and internal reserves of Mount Eagle are the earliest examples of the Griffins' suburban design approach in Victoria. Covenants have largely ensured the survival of the original street lay out and internal reserves.

In addition to the entire estate, the following three adjacent houses, all designed by Harold Desbrowe-Annear and funded by his father-in-law, James Chadwick, were separately added to the Victorian Heritage Register:

- Chadwick house, 23–34 The Eyrie, the home of Desbrowe-Annear's father-in-law
- Desbrowe-Annear house, 38 The Eyrie, Desbrowe-Annear's own home
- Officer house, 55 Outlook Drive (Note: Addressed as 28–30 The Eyrie, when built.)

== See also ==
- Architecture of Melbourne
- List of places on the Victorian Heritage Register in the City of Banyule
