= Mount Eagle =

Mount Eagle or Mounteagle may refer to:

- Mount Eagle (plantation), historic plantation in Virginia, USA
- Mount Eagle (U.S. Virgin Islands), highest summit on Island of Saint Croix
- Mount Eagle (Ireland) (Sliabh an Iolair), a Marilyn in the Dingle Peninsula, Ireland
- Mount Eagle (Scotland), on the Black Isle; see List of Marilyns in the Northern Highlands
  - Mounteagle transmitting station, on the top of this hill
- Mount Eagle (Chile), a town
- Mount Eagle, Pennsylvania, United States, an unincorporated community
- Eaglemont, Victoria, Australia, formerly named Mount Eagle, a suburb of Melbourne
- Mount Eagle Estate, a real estate subdivision in Eaglemont, Victoria, Australia

== See also ==
- Monteagle (disambiguation)
- Monte Águila, Chile, Mount Eagle in English
