= East View (house) =

Heritage-listed house in Melbourne, Victoria, Australia

- Location of the house in Greater Metropolitan Melbourne
- Interactive map of the East View area

General information
- Status: Completed
- Type: Villa
- Architectural style: Arts and Crafts
- Location: 16 Martin Street, Heidelberg, City of Banyule, Melbourne, Victoria, Australia
- Coordinates: 37°45′15″S 145°03′37″E
- Completed: 1903; 123 years ago
- Client: Herbert Tisdale

Technical details
- Material: Bricks; timber

Design and construction
- Architect: Harold Desbrowe-Annear

Victorian Heritage Register
- Official name: East View
- Type: Registered place
- Designated: 10 March 2005
- Reference no.: H1033
- Heritage overlay no.: HO43
- Category: Residential buildings (private)

East View is a villa located at 16 Martin Street in Heidelberg, in the City of Banyule, in the northern suburbs of Melbourne, in Victoria, Australia. It is one of several houses built by Harold Desbrowe-Annear, a leading Melbourne architect, in the Arts and Crafts style, located in Heidelberg and adjacent suburbs.

Built in 1903 on the traditional lands of the Wurundjeri people, the house was added to the Victorian Heritage Register on 10 March 2005 in recognition of its architectural significance; and was also added to a non-statutory list by the City of Banyule on an unknown date.

== History ==
East View, at 16 Martin Street, Heidelberg is a medium-sized residence built on two levels that utilise the fall of the land. East View is a particularly fine example of the early work of Harold Desbrowe Annear, one of Australia's leading and most innovative Arts and Crafts architects the early twentieth century. Built in 1903, for local shire engineer Herbert Tisdale, who was a champion of the architect's work.

Annear moved to Eaglemont in 1901 where he was able to develop his Arts and Crafts principles through a number of commissions, including his own house, at 36–38 The Eyrie, a house for his father-in-law, James Chadwick, at 32–34 The Eyrie, and the adjacent Officer house, at 55 Outlook Drive, all funded by Chadwick.

== Description ==
East View was built using a timber balloon frame and incorporates a number of elements for which Annear is recognized. These include characteristic window designs, built in furniture, a square corner bay window, a verandah space, or outdoor living area, that Annear called a piazza, the simple use of materials, the expression of structure and a planning layout that moves away from the more traditional form of compartmentalised rooms off a linking hall way toward a more open plan. East View is the most intact example of the architect's work.

As East View is virtually unaltered it offers a clear impression of the architect's intentions. It shows influences from British Arts and Crafts, particularly Baillie Scott, evident in such features as the built-in furniture, such as the window seats, the high vertical ‘weavers’ windows, and the open planning of houses whose spaces are separated by sliding doors, which is an articulation of Scott's notions of an integrated interior. The use of open planning and the expression of materials incorporation of design elements in the body of the house is also a result of Annear's familiarity with the Prairie School houses designed by Frank Lloyd Wright.

== See also ==
- Architecture of Melbourne
- List of places on the Victorian Heritage Register in the City of Banyule
