= St John's Anglican Church, Heidelberg =

Heritage-listed church in Melbourne, Victoria, Australia

St John's Anglican Church
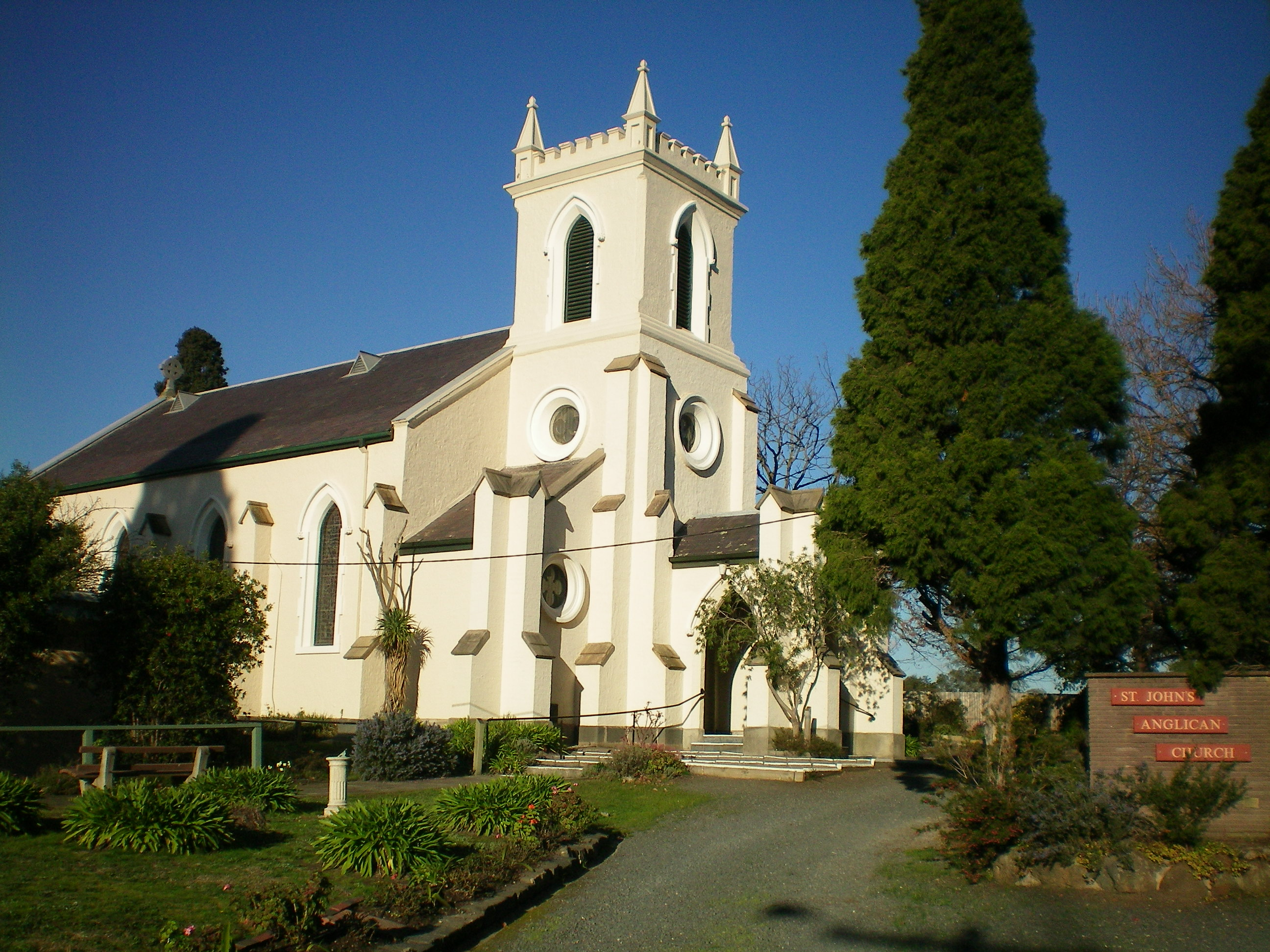
- The church exterior in 2009

- Location of the church in Greater Metropolitan Melbourne
- St John's Anglican Church
- 37°45′23″S 145°04′19″E
- Location: 1 Burgundy Street, Heidelberg, City of Banyule, Melbourne, Victoria
- Country: Australia
- Denomination: Anglican
- Website: banyuleparish.org.au

History
- Status: Church
- Founded: 1848; 178 years ago
- Founder: Bishop Charles Perry
- Dedication: John the Baptist

Architecture
- Functional status: Sunday services only
- Architects: John Gill (1851); Purchas and Swyer (1858); Nathaniel Billing (1880s); Harold Desbrowe-Annear (1900s)
- Architectural type: Church
- Style: Primitive Gothic
- Years built: 1849–1851; 1855–1858; 1880s; 1900s; 1963–1965
- Groundbreaking: 1850
- Completed: October 1851
- Construction cost: £1,343 (1851); $56,000 (1965)

Specifications
- Capacity: 150 worshippers
- Materials: Bricks; bluestone; shingles; slate; stained glass

Administration
- Diocese: Melbourne
- Parish: Banyule

Clergy
- Vicar: Rev. Canon Denise Nicholls

History
- Built by: Snowball and Atchison

Victorian Heritage Register
- Official name: St John's Anglican Church
- Type: Registered place
- Criteria: a., d.
- Designated: 18 June 2026
- Reference no.: H0197
- Heritage overlay no.: HO14
- Category: Religion

Register of the National Estate
- Official name: St Johns Anglican Church
- Type: Defunct register
- Designated: 21 March 1978
- Reference no.: 5608

The St John's Anglican Church is a heritage-listed Anglican church, located at 1 Burgundy Street, in Heidelberg, in the City of Banyule, in the northern suburbs of Melbourne, in Victoria, Australia.

Built in 1851 on the traditional lands of the Wurundjeri people, the church was added to the Victorian Heritage Register on 18 June 2026 in recognition of its historical and architectural significance; and was also added to the non-statutory and now defunct Register of the National Estate on 21 March 1978, and by the City of Banyule to a non-statutory local government list on an unknown date.

The church is administered by the Anglican Parish of Banyule, that also includes the Holy Spirit Church in Watsonia. The vicar, since 2018, is the Reverend Canon Denise Nicholls.

A Catholic church, also dedicated to St John, is located in Heidelberg.

== History ==
In 1848, the congregation of St John's was established, and Anglican services began to be held in the Presbyterian church in Jika Street. The foundation stone was laid in 1850 by the Anglican Bishop of Melbourne, Charles Perry, and is located to the right of the original entrance bears the inscription 'J.W. 1850'. St John's Anglican Church was built between 1849 and 1851 by builders Snowball and Atchison to a Primitive Gothic (Note: The style has been variously described as Early English Gothic by J.M. Freeland, and Low & Mixed Gothic: Commissioners' Style/Regency/Stuccoed by Miles Lewis.) design by prominent colonial architect John Gill. (Note: Some sources credit George Reilly Cox with the design, however tender notices suggest that the stone church was designed by Gill.)

The church was built at a cost of £1,343, made up of local contributions and a government grant. Congregants who donated to the construction included David Charteris McArthur, owner of Charterisville, Joseph Hawdon, resident of Banyule, and Dr. Robert Martin, a wealthy pastoralist who resided at Viewbank. The first church service was held in the shell of the unfinished building in April 1851. The internal walls were unlined, and externally the walls were not painted or rendered. The roof to the west end section of the church was also incomplete, and a tarpaulin was used to shelter the congregation from the wind and the weather. The completed building was officially opened in October 1851.

Within a few years, the building had serious structural and deterioration issues, with architects Purchas and Charles Swyer engaged to complete the repairs. The original timber shingle roof was built without stays or cross beams, and the ceiling was unlined, leading to movement and water ingress shortly after the building’s completion. Purchas and Swyer were responsible for the rebuilding of the roof, including new supporting beams, reconstruction of the tops of the brick walls, lime rendering of the external walls, and the shingle roof cladding was replaced with slate; all completed by 1858. Since the 1850s, the church has required ongoing structural works, repairs and conservation, due to rising damp and other issues. In the 1880s, Nathaniel Billing, a member of the congregation, assisted with redesign; and in the early 1900s, Harold Desbrowe-Annear, another member of the congregation, undertook some repairs.

Between 1963 and 1965, the church underwent its most significant architectural changes; undertaken due to the continued deterioration of the 1850s fabric.

== Description ==
Side view, showing the additional porch, added in 1965

The church is of brick construction, built on bluestone foundations. The structure is characterised by buttresses, features a box-like nave, lancet windows with hood mouldings, a castellated tower surmounted by pinnacles to the entry, and large oculus. The interior retains its picturesque design.

In 1965, a chapel, choir room, and vestry were built on the south side of the sanctuary, and the original porch was enclosed, creating the present-day narthex. A new entry porch was introduced, extending the church at the front.

The church is located in a pleasant setting with several significant trees including a Bhutan Cypress, several Italian Cypress and Algerian Oaks, a Pin Oak, and Himalayan Cedar which evokes an English village atmosphere, laid out by Charles Swyer in c. 1858.

A stained-glass window was installed in the church, dedicated in 1889, that was funded by the widow of David Charteris McArthur in memory of her deceased husband who was a founding trustee of the parish church.

=== Pipe organ ===
The first pipe organ in the church was a three-cylinder barrel organ, installed in 1852; that was rebuilt in 1873 by George Fincham to incorporate a keyboard with a single manual and four speaking stops. Alfred Fuller removed this organ in 1896 and parts were incorporated into the organ that was at the Methodist Church, Mackenzie Street, in Bendigo; that is now at St Philip's Catholic Church, Blackburn North. In December 1896, Fuller built the present mechanical-action organ with two manuals, ten speaking stops, and three couplers. It incorporated one of Fuller's 'signature' cases with the longest pipes placed on either side of the console. In 1965, the organ was rebuilt with sixteen speaking stops, nine couplers, and electro-pneumatic action.

== See also ==
- Architecture of Melbourne
- List of Anglican churches in Melbourne
- List of places on the Victorian Heritage Register in the City of Banyule
