= List of places on the Victorian Heritage Register in the City of Banyule =

This is a list of places on the Victorian Heritage Register in the City of Banyule in Victoria, Australia. The Victorian Heritage Register is maintained by the Heritage Council of Victoria.

The Victorian Heritage Register, as of September 2026, listed the following 22 state-registered places within the City of Banyule:

Place name	Place #	Location	Suburb or Town	Co-ordinates	Built	State registered	Photo
Banyule Homestead	H0926	60 Buckingham Dr	Heidelberg	37°44′53″S 145°05′01″E	1846	9 October 1974	
Chadwick House	H1156	32–34 The Eyrie	Eaglemont	37°45′56″S 145°03′48″E	1904	18 April 1996	
Charterisville	H1140	77–79 Burke Rd	Ivanhoe	37°46′27″S 145°03′51″E	1840	8 February 1996	
Delbridge House	H1871	55 Carlsberg Rd	Eaglemont	37°45′53″S 145°03′41″E	1960	9 March 2000	
Desbrowe-Annear house	H1009	38 The Eyrie	Eaglemont	37°45′56″S 145°03′46″E	1904	21 July 2005	
East View	H1033	16 Martin St	Heidelberg	37°45′15″S 145°03′37″E	1903	10 March 2005	
Elliston Estate and Rosanna Parklands	H2454	Residential estate	Rosanna	37°44′20″S 145°04′06″E	1969	11 June 2026	
Glenard Estate	H2103	Residential estate	Eaglemont	37°45′38″S 145°04′14″E	1915	28 December 2006	
Head Teacher's residence (former)	H1617	114 Cape St	Heidelberg	37°45′18″S 145°04′04″E	1878	20 August 1982	
Heidelberg Town Hall	H2077	275 Upper Heidelberg Rd	Ivanhoe	37°45′57″S 145°02′43″E	1937	29 December 2005	
Lippincott house	H2091	21 Glenard Dr	Eaglemont	37°45′52″S 145°04′06″E	1917	10 August 2006	
Macgeorge house	H2004	25 Riverside Dr	Ivanhoe	37°47′00″S 145°02′21″E	1911	14 November 2002	
Marshall garden	H1962	40 Carlsberg Rd	Eaglemont	37°45′51″S 145°03′50″E	1945	13 June 2002	
Mount Eagle Estate	H2104	Residential estate	Eaglemont	37°46′05″S 145°03′40″E	1916	28 December 2006	
Murray Griffin house	H1324	52 Darebin St	Heidelberg	37°45′13″S 145°03′52″E	1922	19 June 1997	
Officer house	H2082	55 Outlook Dr (Note: Addressed as 28–30 The Eyrie, when built.)	Eaglemont	37°45′56″S 145°03′49″E	1903	14 September 2006	
Pholiota	H0479	23 Glenard Dr	Eaglemont	37°45′51″S 145°04′06″E	1920	29 October 1980	
Ravenswood	H0199	40 Beauview Pde	Ivanhoe East (Note: Sometimes listed as located in Ivanhoe.)	37°46′16″S 145°03′19″E	1891	9 October 1974	
Snelleman house	H2282	40 Keam St	Ivanhoe East	37°46′06″S 145°04′02″E	1954	14 July 2011	
St John's Anglican Church	H0197	1 Burgundy St	Heidelberg	37°45′23″S 145°04′19″E	1849	18 June 2026	
Viewbank	H1396	290 Banyule Rd	Viewbank	37°44′50″S 145°05′35″E	1839	11 December 1997	
Waller house and collection	H0617	9–9A Crown Rd	Ivanhoe	37°46′55″S 145°02′16″E	1922	19 February 1986	
