= Delbridge House =

Heritage-listed house in Melbourne, Victoria, Australia

- Location of the house in Greater Metropolitan Melbourne
- Interactive map of the Delbridge House area

General information
- Status: Completed
- Type: House
- Architectural style: International modernist
- Location: 55 Carlsberg Road, Eaglemont, City of Banyule, Melbourne, Victoria, Australia
- Coordinates: 37°45′53″S 145°03′41″E
- Year built: 1957–1960
- Completed: 1960; 66 years ago
- Client: Harold and Florence Delbridge
- Owner: Harold and Florence Delbridge (1957–1993)

Technical details
- Material: Stone; glass; reinforced concrete; terrazzo; timber; tiles; brass
- Floor count: 3 (tiered)
- Grounds: 1,127 m^{2} (12,130 sq ft)

Design and construction
- Architect: Max Delbridge
- Main contractor: Ian, Max, Malcolm, and Harold Delbridge

Victorian Heritage Register
- Official name: Delbridge House
- Type: Registered place
- Designated: 9 March 2000
- Reference no.: H1871
- Heritage overlay no.: HO122
- Category: Residential buildings (private)

Register of the National Estate
- Official name: Delbridge House (former)
- Type: Defunct register
- Designated: undated
- Reference no.: 102746

The Delbridge House is a house located at 55 Carlsberg Road in Eaglemont, in the City of Banyule, in the northern suburbs of Melbourne, in Victoria, Australia.

Built in 1960 on the traditional lands of the Wurundjeri people, the house was added to the Victorian Heritage Register on 9 March 2000 in recognition of its architectural and aesthetic significance; and was also added to non-statutory lists by the Victorian branch of the National Trust on 5 September 1994 and the now defunct Register of the National Estate on an unknown date.

== History ==
The Delbridge House was designed and built by three brothers, all builders, Ian, Max and Malcolm, for their parents, Harold and Florence Delbridge. Max was the principal designer, and in company with his brothers and father, also a builder, undertook the actual construction as well. The site was purchased in 1957, and the house was largely completed in 1960. Mr & Mrs Delbridge lived in the house until their deaths in 1991 and 1993 respectively. At this time, the brothers decided to sell the house, and Max took the opportunity to finalise some elements he intended, yet had not previously completed.

The house was a setting in Australian television mini-series including Miss Fisher's Murder Mysteries and The Newsreader, plus various commercials, and was sold in 2023 for c.A$3.3 million.

== Description ==
The house, located high up a sloping site, is a dramatically designed and sited structure. The impression is of an extremely light-weight building, an expectation heightened by the sheer all-glass floor to ceiling walls and a thin concrete cantilevered flooring system set on thin supporting steel piloti. The effect is of a house hovering above the ground with little apparent support. The structure is in reinforced concrete, supported by a cross-shaped slate clad central spine that rises up through all three levels of the building. While the house appears large, it is in fact a small two-bedroom house, mainly on one floor, yet tiered over three levels.

The ground floor is largely open, with carparking and entry lobby, and the top floor is a single sunroom with access to the extensive roof. The interior of the house features numerous unusual and original decorative features largely designed by Max Delbridge in the International modernist style, such as the cantilevered terrazzo stairs, the bent brass stair railing, the natural patterned stone on the central support, the wood-block patterning on the central corridor, the square patterned tiling in the bathroom, the coloured glass-bead light fittings in the lounge, and the chequerboard coloured concrete on the rear elevation. These features have been carefully detailed and integrated and remain substantially intact.

== See also ==
- Architecture of Melbourne
- List of places on the Victorian Heritage Register in the City of Banyule
