= Inglesby =

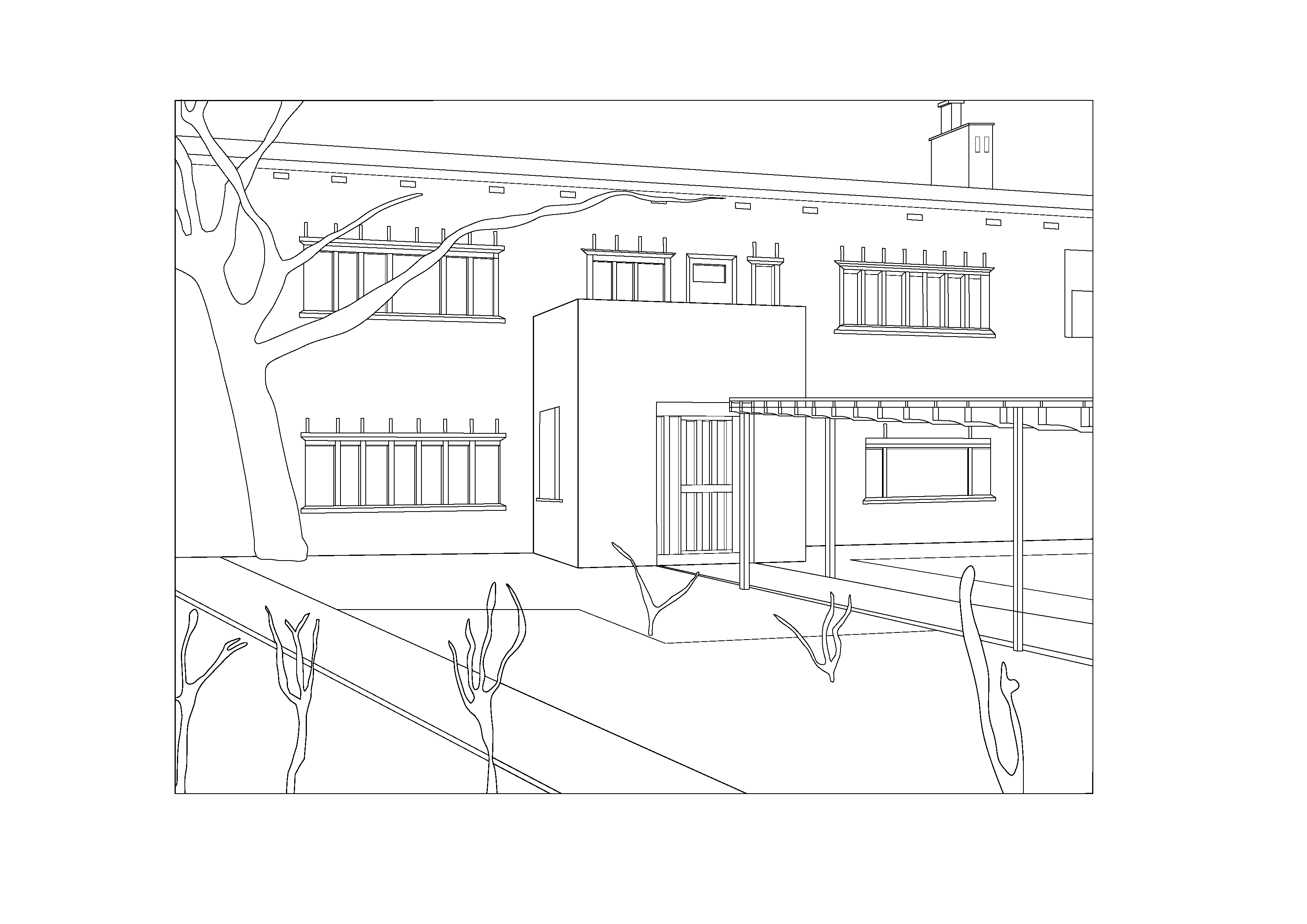
- Inglesby Front Yard Perspective Drawing

- Location within Victoria

General information
- Location: South Yarra, Victoria, Australia
- Coordinates: 37°50′3.89″S 144°59′21.58″E
- Opened: 1915
- Demolished: 1964

Design and construction
- Architect: Harold Desbrowe-Annear

Inglesby, otherwise known as the Francis House, was located in South Yarra, Melbourne, Australia. It was designed by local architect Harold Desbrowe-Annear and completed in 1915.

The house was designed for the Francis family, who emigrated from England in the late 19th century. The house was named Inglesby after the family estate in England of the same name. Inglesby was at the forefront of modernism in Australia, by using open-planning and enabling views across the entire house due to few interior walls. Desbrowe-Annear also introduced the ability to open up spaces to combine rooms, or to close them off to create multiple separate spaces. Furthermore, the use of plain white walls, a simple rectangular foot print, and reduced ornamentation also constituted the modernist style through the creation of pure and ordered form. The house was demolished in 1964 and a set of apartment blocks have been erected, which hold references to the Francis House through materiality and retaining the name Inglesby.

== Description ==
Inglesby was a white, two-storey rectangular building influenced by the Californian style architecture of the time, with a large garden buffering the house from the street. The building was structurally supported with a simple timber frame clad with white roughcast blocks. In terms of roofing, Desbrowe-Annear hinted at modernism by using a slightly pitched a tiled roof, but ensuring the roof appeared flat from the street. Moreover, each window incorporated small wooden eyelash like brackets, communicated with the wooden pergola, which divided the front garden. This use of exposed wood aimed to accentuate the importance of use of Australian timber and materials. The porch in front of the building is a key feature of the house. This square enclosed space was a direct translation of Irving Gill’s style of modernism, through the use of uncomplicated openings, symmetry and simplicity. The porch dominated the façade and was a pioneering feature in contemporary Australian architecture due to the simplicity, elegance and proportionality of its white walls. Through Inglesby, Desbrowe-Annear began to question the role of ornamentation, proving that a simple shape can be just as bold and eye catching.

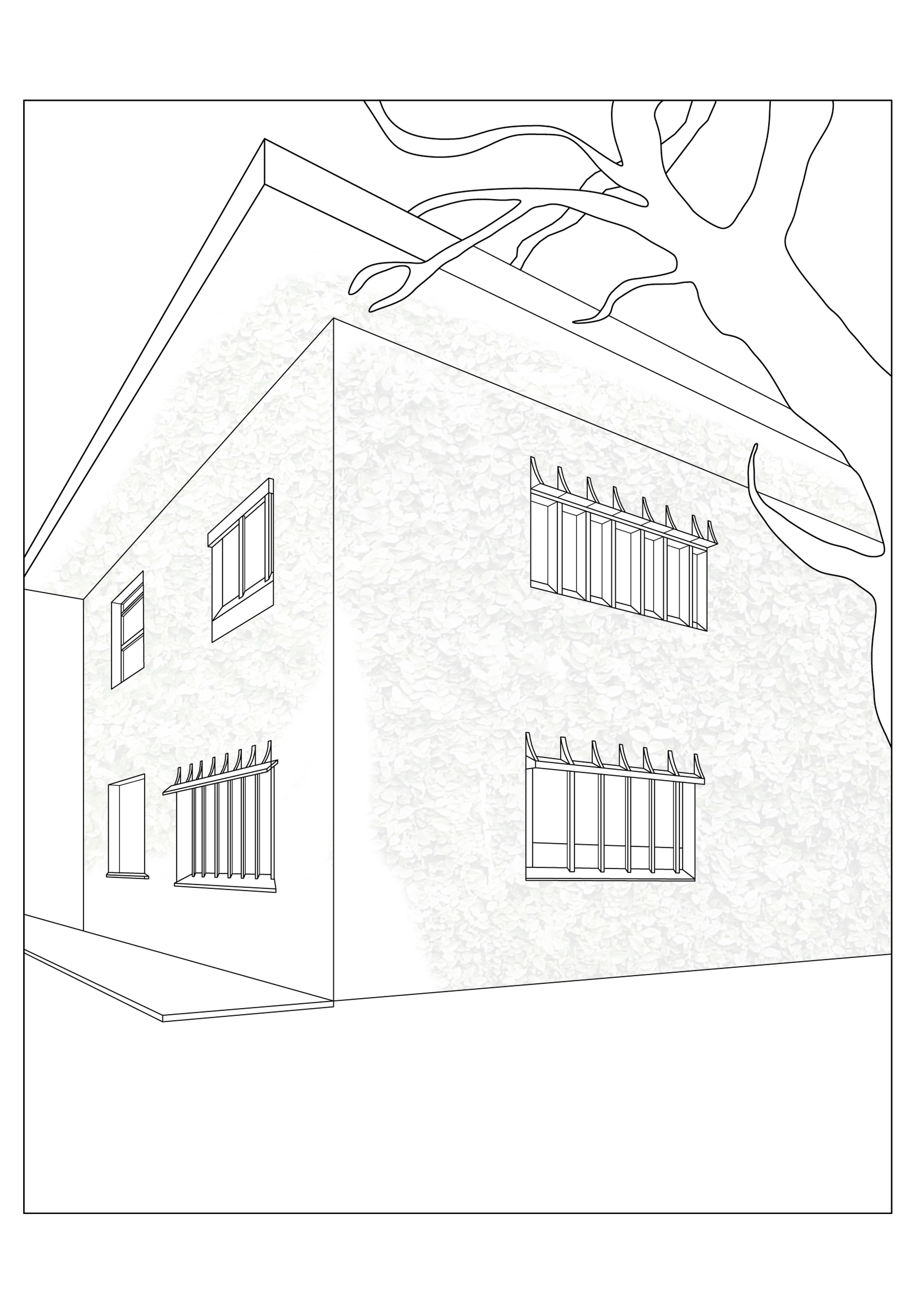
Corner shot

The porch led into a hallway which divided the building and acted as a central spine and provided internal axial circulation and contained a wooden staircase which provided access to the bedrooms and bathrooms. The living space consisted of a dining and living room opening off the hall. Sliding doors allowed this space to be split into two separate rooms or opened into one large space which inhabited the entire front of the house. There were few interior walls in the Francis house, which incorporated the idea of open plan living. Furthermore, Inglesby had low ceilings with wide hallways and rooms, which emphasised the feeling of spaciousness and width, as each space sprawled across the wooden floors. Desbrowe-Annear also introduced the idea of built-in furniture and robes to Australian architecture. This meant less furniture was needed, removing clutter from the room and emphasising the extensive open spaces.

== Influences ==
=== Irving J. Gill ===
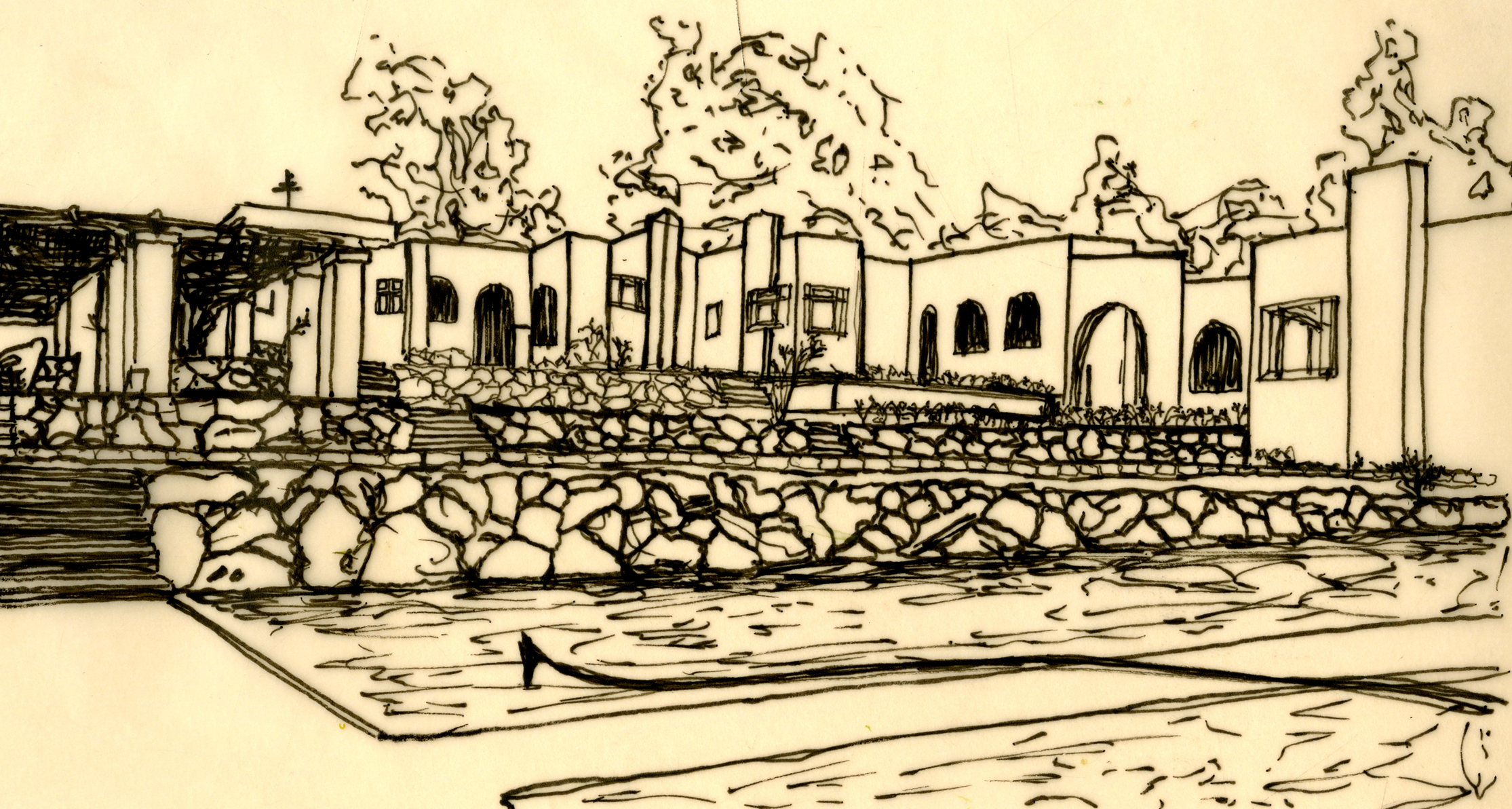
Lewis Court perspective

The design of Inglesby arrived through the influence of American architect Irving Gill’s forms. Irving J. Gill’s design concepts were centred on the attributes of simplicity, honesty and democracy. Many of Gill’s projects were in Southern California and were minimalist in terms of ornamentation and form. They were often simple boxes in plan, characterised by flat or low pitched roofs. Their entrances were commonly placed at the end of a long pergola or an extended arcade. Spaces were also designed with the intention of dual or multiple functions. A primary example of this style is the Lewis Court Cottage, which had a large scale pergola acting as an entrance, living-dining room and outdoor porch. To tie everything together, a garden surrounded the porch and entrance, providing the formalities of a front yard.

=== M.H. Baillie Scott ===
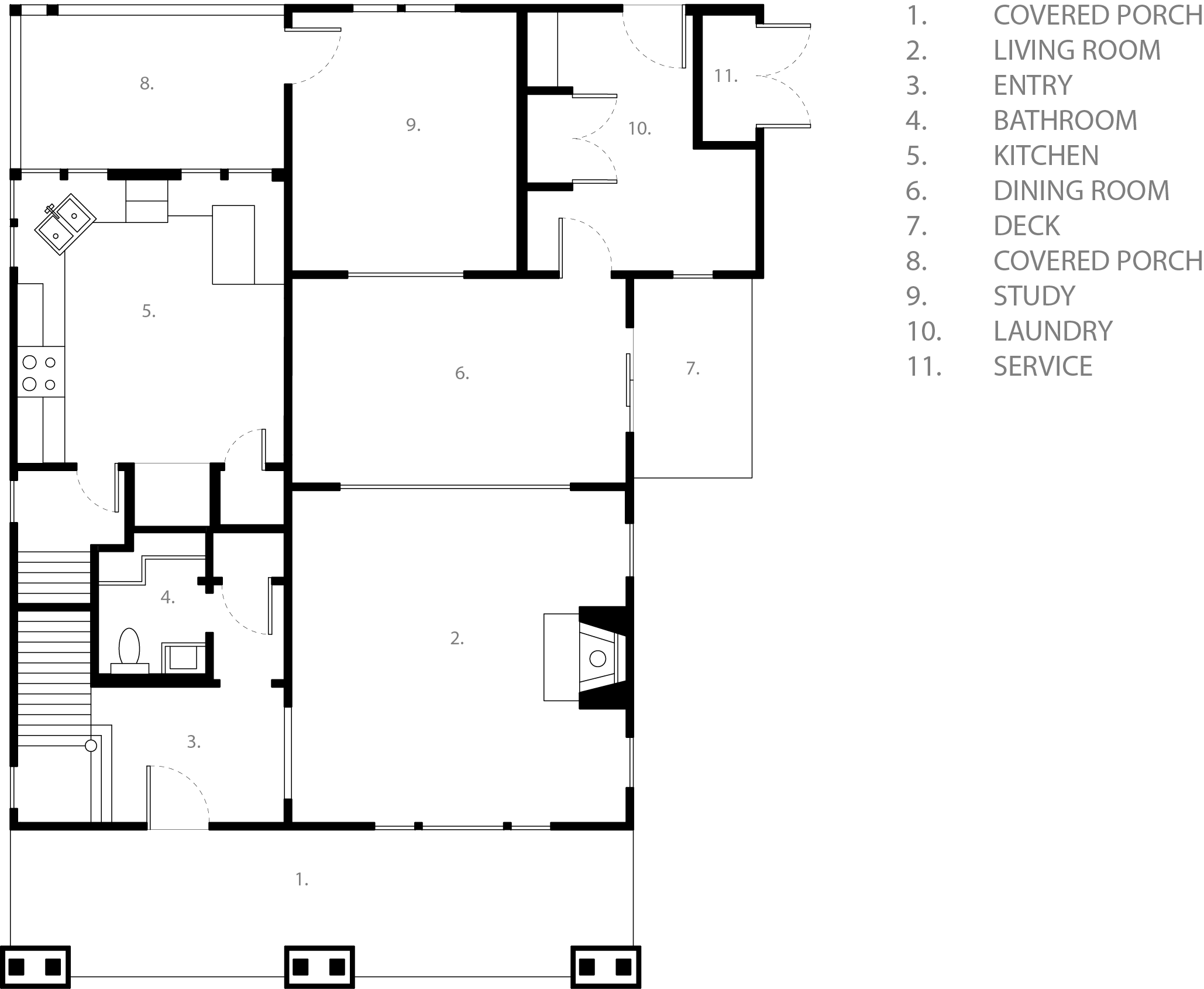
M.H. Baillie Scott plan

Desbrowe-Annear took inspiration from the designs of English architect M.H. Baillie Scott. Baillie Scott was known for his residential designs, which incorporated the idea of open planning with a large living area being the heart of the house in terms of location and spatial volume. It served multiple functions of living and dining with access to the office, workroom and lavatory as well. All of these rooms were usually linked through large sliding doors, allowing each space to be opened or closed off.

Baillie Scott states.

“In making the plan for a house it will be necessary to banish from one’s mind the conception of its interior as a mere group of isolated compartments, and to think of it rather as a central room surrounded by subordinated ones, some of which may in many cases form either recesses in the central apartment or communicate with it either by folding or sliding doors.”
