= Norman Macgeorge =

Australian painter and critic (1872–1952)

- Born: 8 July 1872; Adelaide, South Australia
- Died: 2 September 1952 (aged 80); Ivanhoe, Melbourne, Victoria
- Education: St Peter's College, Adelaide; Adelaide School of Design; National Gallery School
- Occupations: Artist and art critic
- Spouse(s): May Ina, née Hepburn (m. 1911)
- Parents: Alexander Macgeorge (father); Rachel Elizabeth Macgeorge, née Luxmoore (mother)
- Relatives: Robert Forsyth Macgeorge (grandfather); James Macgeorge (uncle)

Norman Macgeorge (8 July 1872 – 2 September 1952) was an Australian colonial artist and art critic, active in Melbourne, Victoria.

== Biography ==
Outside in the Morning Light, by Macgeorge, undated

Norman Macgeorge was born on 8 July 1872 in Adelaide, South Australia. He was a son of Rachel Elizabeth Macgeorge, née Luxmoore and Alexander Macgeorge, and a grandson of Robert Forsyth Macgeorge, prosperous tailors and drapers of Hindley Street then King William Street in Adelaide. An uncle, James Macgeorge, an Adelaide architect, was a prominent member of the South Australian Society of Arts.

Macgeorge was educated at St Peter's College, Adelaide and studied art at the School of Design in Adelaide under H. P. Gill.

Between 1891 and 1895, Macgeorge taught art at Glenelg Grammar, Queen's College, and Hahndorf College, then moved to Melbourne to continue his studies at the National Gallery School. After failing to win a travelling scholarship in 1899, he made his own way to Britain and Europe, where he visited major centres of art. He taught freehand drawing at Wesley College, Melbourne, Melbourne Teachers' College, and Melbourne Church of England Grammar School.

Macgeorge was a prominent member of the Australian Art Association and its second president, and in 1938 helped found the Contemporary Art Society. He wrote regularly on the arts for The Herald, in Melbourne.

Macgeorge married May Ina Hepburn (5 May 1882 – 27 August 1970) of Mornington on 25 January 1911. She was a granddaughter of John Stuart Hepburn. The same year, he commissioned Harold Desbrowe-Annear to build, in bushland at the junction of Darebin Creek and the Yarra River, at 25 Riverside Road, Ivanhoe, a residence "Ballangeich" which remained their lifelong home and a popular gathering place for artists.

Macgeorge died in 1952 and his wife, May, in 1970. Childless, they bequeathed their estate to The University of Melbourne. Their former home, now known as Macgeorge house, including its furnishings, were set aside for use by the university as accommodation for their artists-in-residence program; and their financial support funded The Norman Macgeorge Scholarship that "… provides PhD students in the visual, creative and performing arts, music, architecture, conservation, literature, creative writing, language, history, philosophy and anthropology at the University of Melbourne with financial assistance to travel overseas on a research trip."

=== Selected works ===
- Mother of Pearl (painting). 1906.; held by the National Gallery of Victoria
- Beach scene with man and woman (painting). 1930.; held by the Ian Potter Gallery of the University of Melbourne
- Venice (painting). 1930.; held by the Ian Potter Gallery of the University of Melbourne

The university also has a large portrait of Macgeorge, painted by his friend and near-neighbour Napier Waller. The university holds the Macgeorge Collection that includes over 270 watercolours, oil paintings and sketches by the artist.

=== Published works ===
- Macgeorge, Norman (1946). Borovansky Ballet in Australia and New Zealand.
- Macgeorge, Norman (1948). The Arts in Australia.

== See also ==
- Macgeorge family chart
