= Macgeorge house =

Heritage-listed house in Melbourne, Victoria, Australia

- Location of the house in Greater Metropolitan Melbourne
- Interactive map of the Macgeorge house area

General information
- Status: Completed
- Type: House
- Architectural style: California bungalow
- Location: 25 Riverside Drive, Ivanhoe, City of Banyule, Melbourne, Victoria, Australia
- Coordinates: 37°47′00″S 145°02′21″E
- Completed: 1911; 115 years ago
- Client: Norman Macgeorge
- Owner: Norman and May Macgeorge (1911–1970); University of Melbourne (since 1970)

Technical details
- Material: Timber; bricks
- Grounds: 8,600 m^{2} (93,000 sq ft)

Design and construction
- Architect: Harold Desbrowe-Annear

Victorian Heritage Register
- Official name: Macgeorge House
- Type: Registered place
- Designated: 14 November 2002
- Reference no.: H2004
- Heritage overlay no.: HO51
- Categories: Residential buildings (private); Education

Register of the National Estate
- Official name: Macgeorge House
- Type: Defunct register
- Designated: undated
- Reference no.: 103854

The Macgeorge house, also known as Fairy Hills, is a house located at 25 Riverside Drive in Ivanhoe, in the City of Banyule, in the northern suburbs of Melbourne, in Victoria, Australia.

Built in 1911 on the traditional lands of the Wurundjeri people, the house was added to the Victorian Heritage Register on 14 November 2002 in recognition of its architectural and historical significance; and, on unknown dates, was also added to the non-statutory and now defunct Register of the National Estate, and by the City of Banyule, to a non-statutory local government list.

== Description ==
The house was built in 1911, designed by Harold Desbrowe-Annear, for artist and art critic Norman Macgeorge and his wife, May Ina Hepburn. The substantial bungalow is situated at the intersection of the Yarra River and Darebin Creek and is roughcasted externally with some half timbering to gables. The interior is comprehensively finished in a variety of natural and dark stained timbers, with very fine hand crafted detailing to fittings and furnishings. The house remains largely intact to its original appearance and character to both exterior and interior.

While the house demonstrates a number of features typical of his work at this time, such as his love of roughcasted and half-timbered bungalow forms and richly detailed Arts and Crafts interiors, it shows his broad tendency in this period toward simplification and abstraction of form and details, factors important to the notable character of his later work. The associated gardens are an integral part of the original conception of the site by Norman and May Macgeorge. Vestiges of the original formal garden adjacent the house and of the bush garden along the river make an important contribution to the appreciation of the site and of the tastes of the era.

=== Bequest ===
Norman Macgeorge, who was strongly linked with the Heidelberg School, lived at the house until his death in 1952. In 1970, his widow bequeathed the house, including its furniture and furnishings, to The University of Melbourne for use by the university as accommodation for their artists-in-residence program. The university made considerable efforts to maintain the intactness of the house in order to demonstrate the historic associations with Norman Macgeorge and the arts community of the time. The intactness also gives a rare glimpse into how a Desbrowe-Annear bungalow was used by the people that commissioned it.

== See also ==
- Architecture of Melbourne
- List of places on the Victorian Heritage Register in the City of Banyule
