= Marshall garden =

Heritage-listed garden in Melbourne, Victoria, Australia

- Location of the garden in Greater Metropolitan Melbourne
- Interactive map of Marshall garden
- Type: Private cottage garden
- Location: 40 Carlsberg Road, Eaglemont, City of Banyule, Melbourne, Victoria, Australia
- Coordinates: 37°45′51″S 145°03′50″E
- Created: 1945; 81 years ago
- Founder: Blanche Marshall
- Designer: Edna Walling; Ellis Stones; Eric Hammond

Victorian Heritage Register
- Official name: Marshall Garden
- Type: Registered place
- Designated: 13 June 2002
- Reference no.: H1962
- Heritage overlay no.: HO123
- Category: Parks, Gardens and Trees

The Marshall garden is a private cottage garden located at 40 Carlsberg Road in Eaglemont, in the City of Banyule, in the northern suburbs of Melbourne, in Victoria, Australia.

Established in 1945 on the traditional lands of the Wurundjeri people, the garden was added to the Victorian Heritage Register on 13 June 2002 in recognition of its historical, aesthetic, and scientific (horticultural) significance; and was also added to a non-statutory list by the City of Banyule on an unknown date.

== History ==
Blanche Marshall (née Scharp) became the owner of 40 Carlsberg Road in 1936 and arranged for her friend and former employer, Edna Walling, to prepare a garden design around her new home. Trained as a pharmacist, Marshall met Walling in 1926 and later became her bookkeeper. She once lived with Walling at Sonning and in 1928 owned land at Bickleigh Vale, which she later sold back to Walling. After Marshall's marriage in 1929, her family often visited Bickleigh Vale at Mooralbark, and 'Aunty Edna' became godmother to her daughter Jane.

== Description ==
The garden Walling designed for the Marshalls was a fitting style for the simple unostentatious house. In many ways it is similar to the garden designs at Bickleigh Vale, which Walling commenced in the 1920s and where Marshall once resided and was a regular visitor. There were few structures, only a set of steps, a stone retaining wall, and garden bed edges, a small concrete pond, gravel driveway, stepping stones, and flagstone paving. Eric Hammond was engaged as the landscape contractor for the stone work and planting, and Ellis Stones constructed a rock outcrop. All the garden beds curve and grassy glades disappear around corners. The placement of beds, shrubs, trees and lawn spaces creates a garden with a sense of mystery. Forget-me-nots, bulbs and hellebores are allowed to define the pleasantly vague edges between garden and lawn.

The front of the garden is enclosed by a low Monterey Cypress (Cupressus macrocarpa) hedge, which is part of the original plan. Though the garden is overgrown in parts, and cleared in others, it contains a number of notable trees including Silver Birch (Betula pendula), Lillypilly (Acmena smithii), a Chinese Elm (Ulmus parvifolia), as well as smaller, mature trees and shrubs, such as various Flowering Cherries (Prunus cv.) and Indian Hawthorn (Raphiolepsis sp.). A large Common Oak (Quercus robur) at the bottom of the garden appears to predate the Walling design.

Halfway down the garden, amongst the flowering shrubs, is a single room studio. Although it was not shown on the 1936 plan it was designed by Walling and built by Stones. The rich brown vertical timber boards of the cabin with its tiny wooden porch, white windows and brick chimney creates a charming picture. The building is in a similar style to The Barn, which Walling built at Bickleigh Vale.

Marshall determinedly preserved the informal spirit of the garden and was a great student of Walling. Marshall's daughter reported in 1986 that the garden had remained largely unaltered since its construction. Nearly all the plants in the garden are those favoured by Walling and their friendship over a long period saw Walling continue to provide advice for almost forty years.

The Marshall garden is contiguous with Appledore, the garden located at 45 Devon Street, which is situated immediately at the rear of 40 Carlsberg Road, also designed by Walling after 1935 for Frederick Grassick.

== See also ==
- List of gardens in Victoria
- List of places on the Victorian Heritage Register in the City of Banyule
- Parks and gardens of Melbourne
