= Glenard Estate =

Heritage-listed real estate subdivision in Melbourne, Victoria, Australia

- Location of the estate in Greater Metropolitan Melbourne
- Interactive map of the Glenard Estate area

General information
- Status: Completed
- Type: Real estate subdivision
- Architectural style: Garden suburb
- Location: Eaglemont, City of Banyule, Melbourne, Victoria, Australia
- Coordinates: 37°45′38″S 145°04′14″E
- Completed: 1915; 111 years ago

Design and construction
- Architects: Walter Burley Griffin; Marion Mahony Griffin
- Developer: Peter Keam

Victorian Heritage Register
- Official name: Glenard Estate
- Type: Registered place
- Designated: 28 December 2006
- Reference no.: H2103
- Heritage overlay no.: HO126
- Categories: Parks, Gardens and Trees; Urban Area

The Glenard Estate, or more simply, Glenard, is a garden suburb real estate subdivision located in Eaglemont, in the City of Banyule, in the northern suburbs of Melbourne, in Victoria, Australia. The estate comprises houses, streets, and parks located on Glenard Drive, Mossman Drive, and sections of Lower Heidelberg Road, and The Boulevard in Eaglemont.

The estate was added to the Victorian Heritage Register on 28 December 2006 in recognition of its historical and aesthetic significance; and was also added to a non-statutory list by the City of Banyule on an unknown date.

== History ==
In 1906 the Glenard Estate, formerly a dairy farm, was purchased by New Zealand-born Peter Ernest Keam MBE (1874–1946), an engineer and grazier. His 152-acre (62 ha) property extended from Heidelberg Road and Banksia Street to the Yarra River, which he subdivided gradually over the following years into smaller allotments.

Keam was a founding member of the Town Planning Association of Victoria, established 1914. He commissioned Prairie School architects, Walter Burley Griffin and his wife, Marion, who, in 1912, won an international design competition for Australia's capital city, Canberra. The Griffin's first real estate subdivision design was for Keam at the neighbouring Mount Eagle Estate, completed in 1914.

Glenard was also commissioned by Keam and is the second example of the Griffins' suburban designs, completed the following year. Glenard shares many attributes with the nearby Mount Eagle Estate, and the initial sale of the Glenard lots was considered a success.

== Description ==
The Griffins advocated garden city planning and the idea of a neighbourhood as a physical and social planning unit. Besides the Glenard and Mount Eagle estates, other significant urban designs in Australia by the Griffins include Canberra, in the Australian Capital Territory, until his resignation in 1920; the New South Wales towns of Leeton and Griffith, both in 1914; the Sydney suburb of Castlecrag, in 1924; and in Victoria, a partially-realised estate in Croydon Hills in 1921, the Ranelagh Estate, on the Mornington Peninsula in 1926, and Milleara Estate in Avondale Heights in 1927–1928, also partially-realised. The Griffins also designed many individual houses and buildings in Australia.

In their design of the Glenard Estate, they took account of the topography of the site and its native vegetation, as well as existing exotic plantings dating from the 1860s. They provided safe internal public spaces within the estate to cater for community needs. The subdivision layouts and internal reserves of Glenard are early examples of the Griffins' suburban design approach in Victoria.

The Glenard Estate consisted of 120 lots in 1915. The curvilinear streets followed the contours of the site, so that views were obtained from each allotment, and internal reserves for safe community use reflected the Griffins' principles. The public reserves did not take up valuable street frontages but instead used land made spare by the irregular plan. The reserves, together with the unfenced back gardens recommended by the Griffins, were intended to provide common playing space for children, safe from motor traffic and easily supervised. The Griffins argued that suburbia should provide 'playing grounds for the children so they can grow up healthy and vigorous under as nearly as possible open country natural conditions'.

The streets follow the site contours with internal reserves provided for community use. These reserves, together with the recommended un-fenced back gardens were intended to provide common playing space for children. Covenants have largely ensured the survival of the original street lay out and internal reserves.

In addition to the entire estate, the following two adjacent houses were separately added to the Victorian Heritage Register:

- Lippincott house, 21 Glenard Drive, designed by Roy Lippincott, in collaboration with the Griffins. Lippincott was an assistant to the Griffins and married Genevieve Griffin, a sister of Walter Burley Griffin
- Pholiota, 23 Glenard Drive, the Griffin's own home, that they jointly designed

== See also ==
- Architecture of Melbourne
- List of places on the Victorian Heritage Register in the City of Banyule
