= Lippincott house =

Heritage-listed house in Melbourne, Victoria, Australia

- Location of the house in Greater Metropolitan Melbourne

General information
- Status: Completed
- Type: House
- Architectural style: Arts and Craft; Prairie style
- Location: 21 Glenard Drive, Eaglemont, City of Banyule, Melbourne, Victoria, Australia
- Coordinates: 37°45′52″S 145°04′06″E
- Completed: 1917; 109 years ago
- Client: Roy Lippincott

Technical details
- Material: Bricks; reinforced concrete; glass; timber; Marseilles tiles
- Floor count: 2
- Grounds: 848 m^{2} (9,130 sq ft)

Design and construction
- Architects: Walter Burley Griffin; Marion Mahony Griffin; Roy Lippincott

Victorian Heritage Register
- Official name: Lippincott house
- Type: Registered place
- Designated: 10 August 2006
- Reference no.: H2091
- Heritage overlay no.: HO119
- Category: Residential buildings (private)

Register of the National Estate
- Official name: Lippincott house
- Type: Defunct register
- Designated: 30 June 1992
- Reference no.: 15590

The Lippincott house is a house located at 21 Glenard Drive in Eaglemont, in the City of Banyule, in the northern suburbs of Melbourne, in Victoria, Australia.

Built in 1917 on the traditional lands of the Wurundjeri people, the house was added to the Victorian Heritage Register on 10 August 2006 in recognition of its architectural and historical significance; and was also added to non-statutory lists by the Victorian branch of the National Trust on 8 November 1979 and the now defunct Register of the National Estate on 30 June 1992.

== History ==
=== Background of Roy Lippincott ===
Roy Alstan Lippincott came to Australia in 1914 with Walter Burley Griffin and Marion Mahony Griffin, who had come to work on Griffin's winning design for Australia's new capital, Canberra. Lippincott was also married to Griffin's sister, Genevieve.

After graduating from Cornell University in 1909, Lippincott worked with both Griffin and Mahony in the office of Hermann von Holst in Chicago. When Wright left his family and practice for Europe with the wife of one of his clients in 1909, von Holst took on responsibility for Frank Lloyd Wright's unfinished work. Realising he needed someone who knew Wright's work well, von Holst employed Marion Mahony, a long-time assistant to Wright, to assist with the work. Mahony brought Walter Burley Griffin into the office as someone who also knew Wright's work well. Like Mahony, Griffin had held a position of some responsibility in Wright's office. It is understood that Lippincott undertook the supervision of Wright's Robie House during its construction at this time. Lippincott assisted Griffin with the designs for Canberra, whilst in Chicago, eventually leaving Van Holst's office and becoming Griffin's head draftsman. In Australia, Lippincott was a junior partner in the practice working on various projects.

=== Lippincott house ===
In May 1917, Walter Burley Griffin purchased from Roy Keam, the developer of Glenard Estate, 21 Glenard Avenue for A£61, 12s, 1p. Griffin immediately transferred the property to his sister, Genevieve Griffin Lippincott. The site was one of the few flat blocks of land in the estate, with two large River Red gums.

In 1917, Lippincott built the house on Glenard Drive in the Glenard Estate, the design of which is believed to be a collaboration between Lippincott, Griffin, and Mahony. The Griffins later purchased the neighbouring block, where they build their own house, Pholiota. The Lippincotts lived in the house for four years before Lippincott and Edward Bilson won the competition for the design of the Auckland University College arts building in 1920 and moved to New Zealand in 1921, where they remained until 1939.

From 1939, the house was occupied by (Vaughan) Murray Griffin, an artist, and his wife, Norrie Hinemoa, where they raised two sons, Garry and Nicholas, the latter also became an architect. Murray Griffin was not related to Walter Burley Griffin; however, Griffin designed a Heidelberg house for Murray Griffin's parents, and Walter and Marion were frequent visitors to the Heidelberg house. The Lippincott house remained in the Murray Griffin's family until November 2023, when it was sold for A$2.15 million.

== Description ==
The Lippincott house is a small house of 848 square metres (9,130 sq ft), with steeply pitched Marseilles tile roof and wide boxed eaves. The front elevation is dramatic, with splayed gable, bold oversized barge boards and battered base brick walls with stucco panels as visually lightweight infill between distinctive clinker brickwork piers in which some of the bricks project slightly to create a patterned surface. The house is generously endowed with casement windows which have decorative margin glazing and crossed glazing bars in the upper portions. The design of the window panes, the expression of materials, the roof form and the ingenuity of the design all reflect links to the Prairie style of Arts and Craft architecture of the mid-west United States. This style was brought to prominence by Frank Lloyd Wright, and in Australia, by Walter Burley Griffin and Marion Mahony Griffin. Constructed in 1917 of brick, the lower section of the external wall is a stepped and splayed to sill level. Above sill level the wall is solid brick in a variation of rat trap bond with projecting headers. Above the windows the wall is slightly recessed and rendered.

Internally the house is based on a simple rectangular plan with an attic in the roof and bedrooms, kitchen and bathroom arranged around a central living space. The walls are flush brickwork with the reinforced concrete window heads exposed in some rooms where in others the wall above the window head is a plain rendered frieze. The house integrates natural timber features such as ceiling beams, window frames, and polished floorboards with exposed brick walls. An angular fireplace matches the splayed gable and wide eaves on the facade of the home. Windows are dotted around the house in abundance and provide occupants with a view of the surrounding garden.

The house is distinguished externally by the textured brickwork, the deep overhanging roof and the windows which form a deep band around the corners of the house. The individual window panes are of a simple but elegant geometric pattern. The expressionistic fireplace with its integrated concrete hood and mantle is a prominent feature of the living room. The design was very open plan with only sliding glass doors defining some spaces.

The house is the most distinctive and individual house design in the Glenard Estate. The estate was an innovative suburb design consisting of a series of roads conforming to the contours of the hillside. Each house site was designed to obtain views and abut a reserve area. Energy conservation was incorporated into the design of the house through the use of wide eaves which shaded northerly windows in summer and a wood fire heated water tank set above the central hall, was planned to distribute warm air through adjustable registers in the lounge, dining room and bedrooms downstairs. The house has been sited between two very old and fine River Red gums, one in front and one behind, subsequently dead. There are other trees in the small green triangle formed by street intersections in front of the house. Some large rocks have been grouped and on one of them has been set a bronze memorial plaque to Walter Burley Griffin.

The only major alteration is a row of windows projecting through the southern slope of the roof to provide better lighting for the present owners' attic studio. Apart from this the house is substantially in its original condition. Rather than extend the house the owners have built a separate garage and flat behind it, leaving the original design to stand as a separate entity. The house is maintained in good condition.

== See also ==
- Architecture of Melbourne
- List of places on the Victorian Heritage Register in the City of Banyule
