= Monteagle =

Monteagle may refer to:

- Monteagle, Tennessee
- Monteagle, New South Wales, a small town in Hilltops Council
- Edward Stanley, 1st Baron Monteagle (died 1523) High Sheriff of Lancashire, 1485–1497
- William Parker, 4th Baron Monteagle (1575–1622), English peer, involved in the arrest of the Gunpowder plotters
- Baron Monteagle or Baron Mount Eagle, a title that has been created three times: in the Peerage of England, in the Peerage of Ireland and in the Peerage of the United Kingdom
- Baron Monteagle of Brandon, a title in the Peerage of the United Kingdom created in 1839
