= Eaglemont =

- Suburb
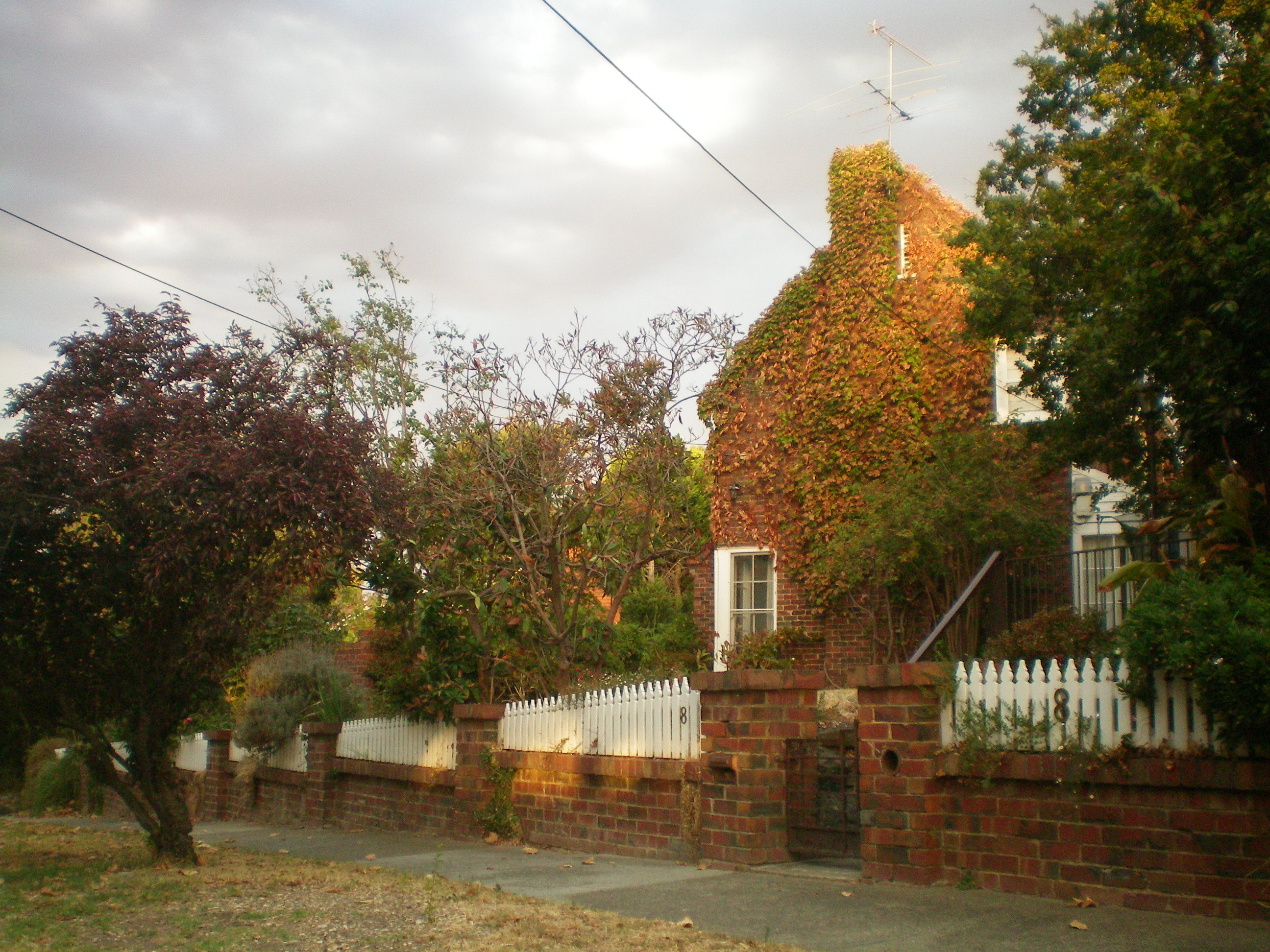
- Ivy-covered house in Eaglemont

- Interactive map of Eaglemont
- Coordinates: 37.763°S 145.066°E
- Country: Australia
- State: Victoria
- City: Melbourne
- LGA: City of Banyule
- Location: 13 km (8.1 mi) from Melbourne
- Established: 1880s

Government
  - State electorate: Ivanhoe
  - Federal division: Jagajaga

Area
  - Total: 1.9 km^{2} (0.73 sq mi)
- Elevation: 53 m (174 ft)

Population
  - Total: 3,960 (2021 census)
  - Density: 2,080/km^{2} (5,400/sq mi)
- Postcode: 3084
Suburbs around Eaglemont
Heidelberg Heights	Heidelberg	Heidelberg
Ivanhoe	Eaglemont	Kew East
Ivanhoe	Ivanhoe East	Bulleen

Eaglemont is a residential suburb located 10 km north-east of Melbourne's Central Business District, within the City of Banyule local government area. At the 2021 census, Eaglemont recorded a population of 3,960.

Originally part of the Mount Eagle Estate, Eaglemont is situated between Ivanhoe East and Heidelberg. The area holds notable cultural and architectural significance, particularly for its association with the Heidelberg School of Australian Impressionism. In the late 1880s, artists such as Arthur Streeton, Tom Roberts, and Charles Conder painted while living at a camp on the Mount Eagle hillside. Streeton's Golden Summer, Eaglemont (1889) was painted here.

In 1915–16, American architects Walter Burley Griffin and Marion Mahony Griffin designed both the Mount Eagle and Glenard Estates using garden suburb principles, including curved streets, native planting, and internal parklands. Their urban design remains largely intact and was added to the Victorian Heritage Register.

Eaglemont is within walking distance of independent schools, the Yarra River, parks, and four nearby shopping precincts: Eaglemont Village, Ivanhoe Village, Ivanhoe East Village, and the Burgundy Street retail strip in Heidelberg. It also borders Yarra Bend Park and includes access to the Yarra Bend public golf course.

As of 2025, Homes in Eaglemont were tightly held, with few properties listed for sale. As of 2025, its median house prices were among the highest in Melbourne, and recent data shows Eaglemont ranked fourth for median price growth among Melbourne's prestige suburbs with a median above $2 million in the five years to March 2025, and increased 24.5 per cent to $2,428,250. The suburb's strong performance has been attributed to its exclusivity, low property turnover, and enduring appeal to affluent families, including many medical professionals drawn to its proximity to Austin Hospital.

== Geography ==
Eaglemont covers an area of approximately 1.9 square kilometres (0.73 sq mi), and lies at an elevation averaging 53 metres (174 ft) AHD. Topographically, Eaglemont includes elevated ridges and hilltops, particularly around the Mount Eagle Estate, which afford views over adjacent suburbs and towards the city. Soil and vegetation are typical of Melbourne's inner-northeastern hillside suburbs, with many trees, mature gardens, and lot sizes that allow for substantial greenery.

The suburb is bordered by Heidelberg to the north, Ivanhoe to the west and south-west, Ivanhoe East to the south, and Kew East and Bulleen to the east. Major roads demarcate many of these borders.

Nearby natural features include the Yarra River and the Yarra Flats Park to the south-east, which provide recreation, vegetation corridors, and contribute to the suburb's leafy character.

Eaglemont is part of Banyule City Council's South Precinct and sits between two important local centres: the Ivanhoe Major Activity Centre and the Ivanhoe East Neighbourhood Activity Centre. The suburb has access to regional open spaces, established community infrastructure, and active transport routes connecting to nearby rail, bus, and bicycle networks.

An historic walking trail called the "Eaglemont Historic Homestead Walk" allows residents and visitors to explore the suburb's heritage-listed houses and early architectural styles set within its bushland environment.

== Demography ==
At the 2021 census, Eaglemont recorded a population of 3,960 people. The median age of residents was 46 years, which is higher than the national median of 38, reflecting the suburb's appeal to more established households. Children aged 0–14 years made up 16.4% of the population, while 22.5% were aged 65 years and over.

The vast majority of dwellings were separate houses (94.5%), with 80.4% of homes owner-occupied, underlining the suburb's low density and long-term residential character. The average household size was 2.7 people, and the median weekly household income was $2,866—significantly above the state average.

The majority of residents were Australian-born (75.0%), with other common countries of birth including England (3.6%), Italy (2.8%), China (2.1%), India (1.4%), and Malaysia (1.3%). The most common ancestries were English (28.4%), Australian (24.7%), Irish (9.2%), Scottish (7.3%), and Italian (6.7%). English was the only language spoken at home by 78.3% of residents. The most common religious affiliations were No Religion (38.5%), Catholic (23.7%), and Anglican (12.6%).

English was the only language spoken at home by 77.7% of residents. Other languages spoken at home included Italian (4.7%), Greek (3.2%), Mandarin (2.9%), Cantonese (1.3%), and Arabic (0.9%).

The suburb is notable for a high proportion of professionals and medical specialists, many of whom are drawn to Eaglemont's proximity to the Austin Hospital and its leafy residential environment. The median monthly mortgage repayment was $3,073, indicative of its status as a high-value real estate area.

== History ==
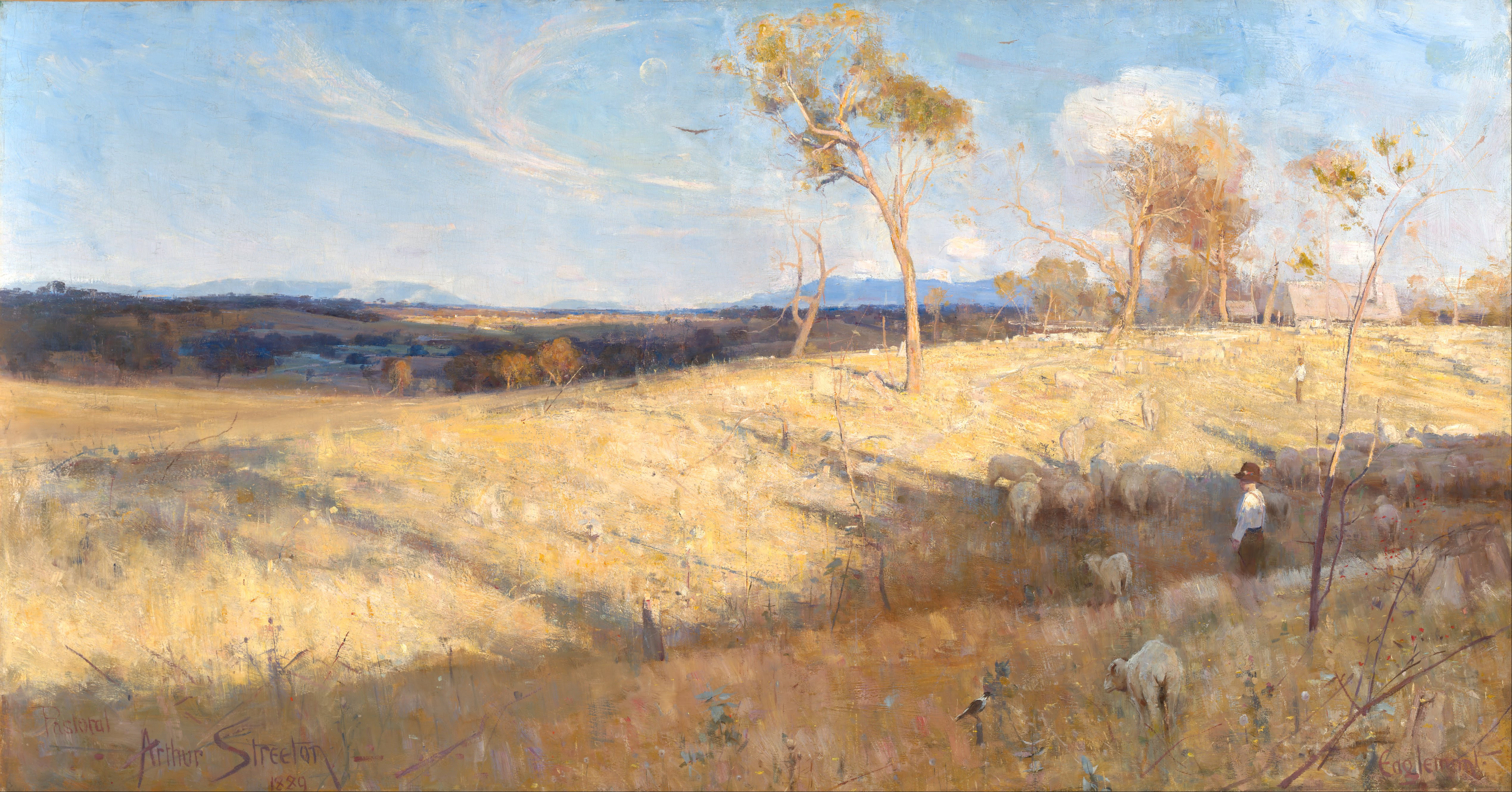
Golden Summer, Eaglemont by Arthur Streeton (1889)

The name “Eaglemont” is believed to derive from “Mount Eagle,” a Crown Grant property acquired in 1838 by Thomas Walker, originally part of the area that later became Eaglemont.

Two properties were built in the area in the 1840s; "Leighton" was built by the Bolden brothers, while "Hartlands" was built by novelist S.J. Browne. "Hartlands" was located on the elevated region known as Mount Eagle and was subdivided in 1853. The area remained agricultural, apart from a large house and gardens, named "Mount Eagle", built in the late 1850s by parliamentarian J.H. Brooke.

During the land boom of the 1880s, the "Mount Eagle" and "Leighton" properties were bought by a syndicate and subdivided. The area was named Mount Eagle Estate. The "Mount Eagle" property failed to sell and remained vacant until 1888 when it was made available to a group of artists. This group became known as the Heidelberg School, and included Tom Roberts, Arthur Streeton, Charles Conder, and Frederick McCubbin.

In 1915 Walter Burley Griffin and Marion Mahony Griffin were commissioned to design a subdivision in the Mount Eagle Estate. The design incorporated curving streets that followed the contours of the land and private parklands, exemplifying a garden suburb layout. In 1916 they designed the nearby Glenard Estate using similar principles. The Griffins designed several houses in the area and later became residents of Eaglemont, living at 23 Glenard Drive in the small knitlock house 'Pholiota'. They lived alongside the house of Walter's brother-in-law Roy Lippincott at number 21.

The Griffin-planned subdivisions set the stage for the later development of the Ivanhoe Views Estate, a precinct south of Mount Eagle that emerged in the interwar period (c. 1920–1940). Located adjacent to the Eaglemont railway station and shopping centre, the estate is recognised for its garden suburb character, featuring a consistent streetscape of single-storey homes in the English Domestic Revival, Spanish Mission, and Californian Bungalow styles. Ivanhoe Views Estate is now included in the Victorian Heritage Database for its cultural and aesthetic significance, with original low front fences, mature gardens, and intact architectural detailing throughout.

Eaglemont Post Office opened on 14 October 1929, three and a half years after the opening of the railway station in May 1926.

=== Heritage and architecture ===
Eaglemont is architecturally significant for its early garden suburb planning, Arts and Crafts design principles, and intact housing stock from the early 20th century. The suburb includes three notable residential subdivisions that reflect different phases in the development of suburban design in Australia: the Mount Eagle Estate (1915), Glenard Estate (1916), and Ivanhoe Views Estate (1920–1940).

==== Heritage listings ====
The following places in Eaglemont are listed on the Victorian Heritage Register:

- Chadwick house, 32–34 The Eyrie, located adjacent to the Desbrowe-Annear and Officer houses, all designed by Harold Desbrowe-Annear, within the Mount Eagle Estate
- Delbridge house, 55 Carlsberg Road
- Desbrowe-Annear house, 38 The Eyrie, located adjacent to the Chadwick and Officer houses, all designed by Harold Desbrowe-Annear, within the Mount Eagle Estate
- Glenard Estate, Residential estate
- Lippincott house, 21 Glenard Drive, located adjacent to Pholiota, within the Glenard Estate
- Marshall garden, 40 Carlsberg Road, a private cottage garden designed by Edna Walling
- Mount Eagle Estate, Residential estate
- Officer house, 55 Outlook Drive, (Note: Addressed as 28–30 The Eyrie, when built.) located adjacent to the Chadwick and Desbrowe-Annear houses, all designed by Harold Desbrowe-Annear, within the Mount Eagle Estate
- Pholiota, 23 Glenard Drive, located adjacent to the Lippincott house, within the Glenard Estate

==== Mount Eagle and Glenard Estates ====
The Mount Eagle and Glenard estates were both planned jointly by Walter Burley Griffin and Marion Mahony Griffin. Their design approach featured curved street layouts following the land's topography, integration of communal green spaces, and open front gardens without high fences, in keeping with the garden suburb philosophy.

The Mount Eagle Estate includes several Arts and Crafts-style dwellings set among mature gardens. Mount Eagle Road is a key example of the estate's character, noted for its elevated sites, canopy trees, and visual cohesion.

The Glenard Estate, adjacent to Mount Eagle, also incorporates curvilinear streets and native landscaping. Many homes retain features such as Knitlock brickwork, timber porches, and detailing characteristic of the Griffin and Lippincott influence. Glenard Drive is the principal street of the estate. The Griffins lived at 'Pholiota', at 23 Glenard Drive in a small knitlock house, located next to the home of Roy Lippincott, an architect, Walter's brother-in-law and his employee.

==== Ivanhoe Views Estate ====
South of the Griffin-planned areas lies the Ivanhoe Views Estate, developed primarily during the interwar period. This precinct features detached houses in styles such as English Domestic Revival, Spanish Mission, and California Bungalow. Key streets retain low front fences, mature gardens, and consistent architectural detailing including hipped terracotta roofs and clinker brick façades. Charlton Road is a particularly intact example from the estate, recognised for its elevated garden settings, architectural cohesion, and high streetscape integrity. Its location near the estate's high point offers sweeping views and well-preserved examples of the Old English revival style. The Ivanhoe Views Estate is listed on the Victorian Heritage Database for its cultural and aesthetic significance, and for demonstrating the suburban ideals of the interwar period.

== Transport ==
Eaglemont is served by the Hurstbridge railway line, with Eaglemont railway station located on Sherwood Road. The station, which opened on 1 May 1926, is unstaffed and unmodernised. It offers parking and bicycle facilities, but has no toilets, no lifts, and no customer service booth.

Eaglemont also has access to several key road corridors. Lower Heidelberg Road runs along its southern boundary, providing access westward to Heidelberg and eastward to Ivanhoe East and Bulleen. Banksia Street and Burgundy Street offer connections to the Eastern Freeway and Bell Street arterial corridors.

The suburb features several walking and cycling routes. The Main Yarra Trail passes through nearby Yarra Flats Park and connects Eaglemont to the city and outer northeastern suburbs via a dedicated shared path. Other informal paths follow the Darebin Creek and parklands, promoting active transport and recreation.

While Eaglemont has no local bus routes connecting the Eaglemont Railway Station, nearby stops on Burke Road, Lower Heidelberg Road, and Burgundy Street provide services linking Heidelberg, Ivanhoe, Doncaster, and surrounding suburbs.

== Amenities ==
As a garden suburb, Eaglemont is primarily residential. As a result, educational facilities, libraries and community facilities, medical services, places of worship, and larger retail shopping centres are located in adjoining suburbs.

=== Community and culture ===
Local residents maintain and enjoy public green spaces. The Friends of Eaglemont Village coordinate regular working bees, nature walks, and restoration projects in parks and reserve areas such as at Ivanhoe Park and in community garden initiatives. There are regular community‑driven events, including walking tours, social meetups (such as “Meet Up and Make It”), and “Fairy Garden” activities for families. Such events contribute to Eaglemont's reputation for a strong local community feel.

=== Education ===
There are no schools in Eaglemont and government and independent education are located in the surrounding suburbs.

=== Libraries and community facilities ===
There are no library and community facilities in Eaglemont and these facilities are located in the adjoining suburbs.

=== Medical services ===
There are no medical services in Eaglemont and government and private medical centres, dental clinics, and allied health providers are located in the surrounding suburbs.

=== Parks and recreation ===
Eaglemont is known for its tree-lined streets, gardens, and walking paths. The suburb borders the extensive Yarra Trail network, providing access for walking and cycling along the Yarra River corridor. Nearby parks include Albert Jones Reserve and Chelsworth Park, which feature playgrounds, sports ovals, and access to the Darebin Creek Trail. Sports clubs and facilities, such as the Ivanhoe Golf Course and Ivanhoe Park Croquet Club, are located in adjacent suburbs and are popular with residents.

=== Places of worship ===
There are no places of worship in Eaglemont and there are several places of worship in the surrounding suburbs.

While Eaglemont itself is primarily residential and does not host large religious institutions within its boundaries, several places of worship are located in the surrounding suburbs and are accessible to residents. These include:

- St John's Anglican Church, Heidelberg – A heritage-listed church offering Anglican services, located just north of Eaglemont.
- St George's Catholic Church, Ivanhoe East – A Catholic parish with regular mass services, located close to the Ivanhoe East shopping strip.
- St Bernadette's Catholic Church, Heidelberg West – Serving the Catholic community in the region.
- Ivanhoe Uniting Church – A progressive Christian church on Seddon Street in Ivanhoe.
- Heidelberg Presbyterian Church – A small Presbyterian congregation located on Rosanna Road.

For residents of other faiths, additional places of worship including mosques, temples, and synagogues are available in nearby suburbs such as Preston, Box Hill, and Doncaster.

=== Shopping and dining ===
Eaglemont Village, located on Silverdale Road adjacent to the Eaglemont railway station, is a heritage‑retail precinct featuring approximately 25 independently owned shops. These include specialty stores, cafés, wine and gift shops, hair and beauty salons, a post office, and other local services. The Eaglemont Village shopping precinct has been a focal point of local life since the mid-20th century. Some commercial buildings in the precinct date back to 1927–28, contributing to its distinctive architectural character. The precinct grew steadily over decades, housing essential services and independent businesses that serve the suburb's residents. Its long-standing shopfronts reflect the suburb's architectural continuity.

== Notable residents ==
Eaglemont has long been associated with prominent artists, architects, and designers whose work has significantly shaped Australian cultural and architectural history, including:

- Cate Blanchett — actress, born in Ivanhoe, attended school nearby
- Robin Boyd — architect, author, critic, and member of the Boyd family, designed the Stone House (1953) in Eaglemont
- Charles Conder — artist associated with early impressionist works in the region
- Harold Desbrowe-Annear — architect, designed three adjacent houses in Eaglemont, including his own house, Chadwick House, and Officer house
- Walter Burley Griffin and Marion Mahony Griffin — planners and architects who designed the Mount Eagle and Glenard Estates, foundational in Eaglemont's garden suburb character, lived in 'Pholiota'
- Roy Lippincott — architect and brother-in-law of Walter Burley Griffin, briefly lived in his own home
- Frederick McCubbin — artist, part of the same cultural movement
- Tom Roberts — artist, part of the Heidelberg School
- Arthur Streeton — artist who painted Golden Summer, Eaglemont (1889), part of the Heidelberg School
- Walter Withers — landscape artist, linked with the Heidelberg/Eaglemont art scene

== See also ==
- City of Heidelberg – Eaglemont was previously within this former local government area.
