= Viewbank (homestead) =

Archaeological site in Melbourne, Australia

Viewbank homestead
- Location of the former homestead and archaeological site in Greater Metropolitan Melbourne

General information
- Status: Completed
- Type: Homestead; Archaeological site
- Architectural style: Victorian
- Location: 290 Banyule Road, Viewbank, City of Banyule, Melbourne, Victoria, Australia
- Coordinates: 37°44′50″S 145°05′35″E
- Completed: 1839; 187 years ago
- Renovated: 1850s
- Demolished: 1920 (homestead only)
- Client: James Williamson
- Owner: James Williamson (1839–1842); Robert and Lucy Martin (1842–1874); anor.; Bartram family (1922–1974)

Technical details
- Material: Stone; clay bricks; slate
- Grounds: 77 ha (190 acres)

Renovating team
- Architect: John Gill

Victorian Heritage Register
- Official name: Viewbank Homestead
- Type: Registered place; Registered archaeological place
- Designated: 11 December 1997
- Reference no.: H1396
- Heritage overlay no.: HO10
- Categories: Farming and Grazing; Residential buildings (private)

The Viewbank homestead, or more simply, Viewbank, is a former homestead and archaeological site, located at 290 Banyule Road in Viewbank, in the City of Banyule, in the northern suburbs of Melbourne, in Victoria, Australia.

Built from 1839 on the traditional lands of the Wurundjeri people, the former homestead and archaeological site was added to the Victorian Heritage Register on 11 December 1997 in recognition of its historic, archaeological, aesthetic, and social significance; and various components on the site were also added to the non-statutory heritage inventory.

== History ==
Edward Willis (1816-1895) settled in the Viewbank area in 1837. James Williamson, a grazier, built a weatherboard homestead on the site in 1839, as part of a large 1830s pastoral run located at the confluence of the Yarra and Plenty rivers. Williamson named the estate 'Viewbank', after a property in Scotland.

In 1842, Viewbank, comprising 78 hectares (192 acres), was acquired by Dr Robert Martin, a wealthy squatter, and his wife, Lucy. Martin was born on the Isle of Skye in Scotland in 1798 and after studying medicine established a practice in Islington, London. He arrived in Melbourne with his wife and three children in 1839 and commenced farming. In Victoria, Martin had holdings in Dunkeld, Clunes, and later at Acheron, and owned several terrace houses on Collins Street. His wife’s income through her father was put towards the purchase of Viewbank, which had been on the market for some time, owing to the depressed economy at the time.

In 1850, Martin constructed a large twelve-room single-storey brick homestead on the site, designed by John Gill in a Victorian style. The original four-room house, built in 1839 was extended to include a large drawing room and dining room, with a further extension in the 1850s or 1860 to provide kitchen and scullery facilities, and wooden out houses, stables, and fences. The house had wide verandahs on two sides, a hip roof made of slate, and large French windows. It is unclear whether Martin incorporated much of the fabric of Williamson's former property into his design, although the archaeological investigations revealed evidence of the incorporation of an earlier four-room structure into Martin's homestead. The Martins – who had six children – were established members of the Port Phillip society who lived at Viewbank from 1844 to 1874, together with servants. In 1867, Martin acquired the nearby Banyule homestead, however, he resided at Viewbank until his death in 1874.

Following her husband's death, the Viewbank estate was leased by various tenants, the last of whom was Thomas Robinson, a dairy farmer, who occupied Viewbank from 1911 to 1920. In the early 1920s, the Viewbank homestead had fallen into disrepair and the main house was demolished in c. 1923. From 1922 until 1974 the site was owned by the Bartram family, who ran a model dairy. It comprises the remains of a house constructed c. 1839 and extended in 1850, remnant plantings, remains of outbuildings, tracks, gateposts, archaeological deposits, and structures associated with the 1930s dairy notably the silage silos and depot shed. Bartram began subdividing the property from the 1950s; and in 1971, sold a portion to the Melbourne Board of Works that forms part of the Yarra Metropolitan Park. Remnants of the original estate were continuously used as a farm until the 1990s.

== Description ==
The remnant garden landscape retains elements of formal terracing, including the driveway, paths to the homestead, and its remnant plantings of the tree species introduced in the nineteenth century. The extensive plantings of English Oak trees (Quercus robur), Fastigiate Monterey Cypress (Cupressus macrocarpa 'Fastigiata' ) and the Port Jackson Fig (Ficus rubignosa), define the extent of the formal garden and driveway. The garden also contains a pair a Funeral Cypress (Chamaecyparis funebris) and an uncommon Cook's Pine (Araucaria columnaris). The surrounding grasslands are important for understanding the early pastoral settlement of Viewbank and the landscape seen in the paintings of the Heidelberg School of painters.

Remnants of Viewbank's farming past can be seen from the historic silos still standing on Banyule Road.

=== Archaeological site ===
Between 1996 and 1999, Heritage Victoria conducted three excavations at the site with help from archaeologists from Melbourne, La Trobe and Flinders universities, and more than 140 archaeology students and community members. The archaeologists uncovered the stone foundations of the house and remnants of hand-made brick walls, fireplaces and other features.

Viewbank is archaeologically important for the extensive below ground remains of the main homestead, the associated farm buildings, servants' quarters, cistern, tip and remains scattered throughout the area. The foundations, deposits and associated artefacts have the potential to provide a greater understanding of nineteenth-century material culture, building construction techniques and social history. The survival of sites associated with early pastoral settlement in Victoria which have not been subsequently disturbed is rare.

== See also ==
- Architecture of Melbourne
- List of places on the Victorian Heritage Register in the City of Banyule
- Plenty River Trail
