= Chadwick House =

Heritage-listed house in Melbourne, Victoria, Australia

Chadwick house
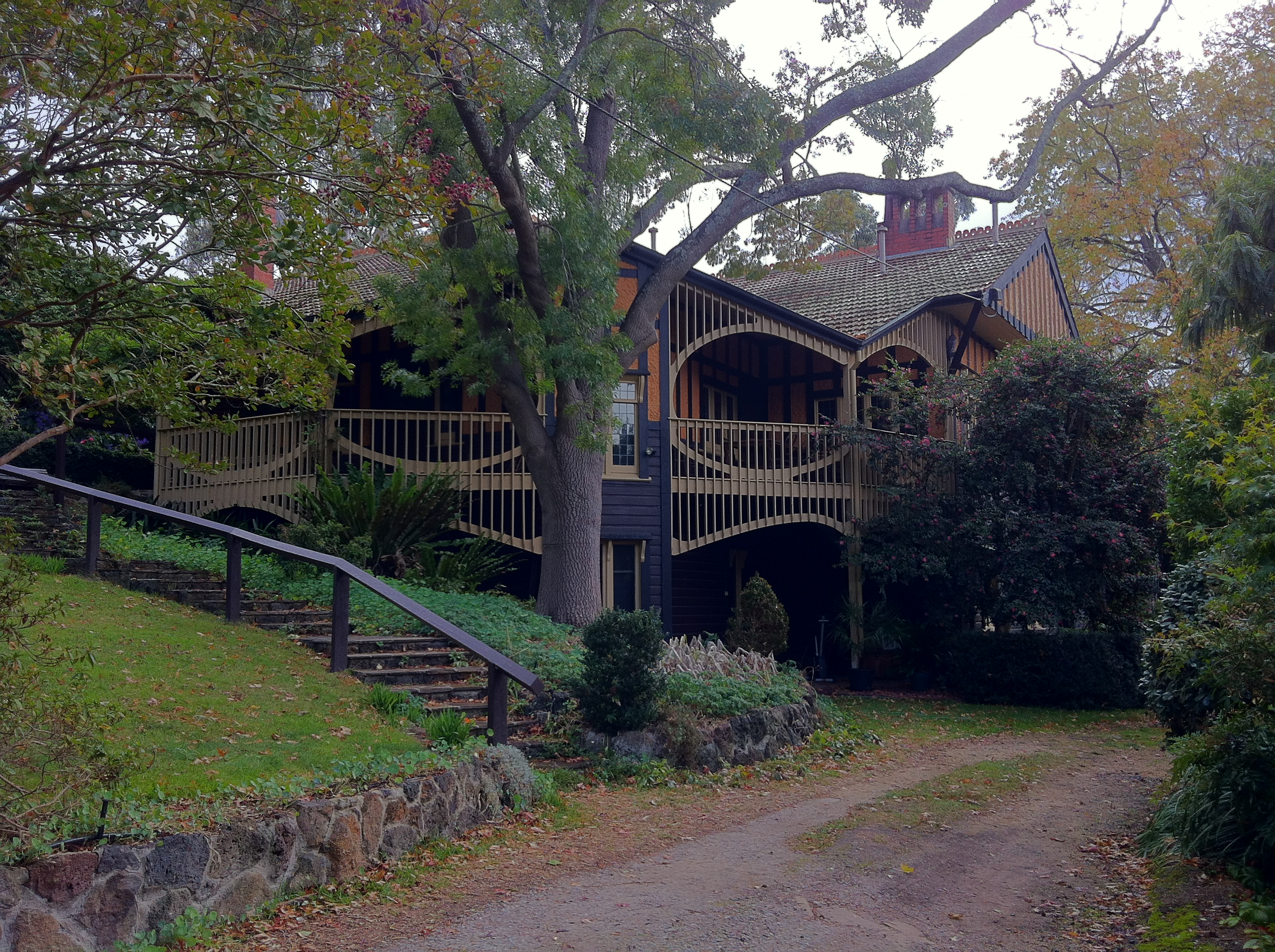
- Chadwick house in 2012

- Location of the house in Greater Metropolitan Melbourne

General information
- Status: Completed
- Type: Villa
- Architectural style: Arts and Crafts
- Location: 32–34 The Eyrie, Eaglemont, City of Banyule, Melbourne, Victoria, Australia
- Coordinates: 37°45′56″S 145°03′48″E
- Completed: 1904; 122 years ago

Technical details
- Material: Bricks; timber; Marseilles tiles

Design and construction
- Architect: Harold Desbrowe-Annear

Renovating team
- Awards: AIA: National Award for Heritage (2008)

Victorian Heritage Register
- Official name: The Chadwick House
- Type: Registered place
- Designated: 18 April 1996
- Reference no.: H1156
- Heritage overlay no.: HO66
- Category: Residential buildings (private)

Register of the National Estate
- Official name: Residences and Grounds, 32–34, 36–38 The Eyrie, Eaglemont
- Type: Defunct register
- Designated: 22 June 1993
- Reference no.: 15710

The Chadwick House is a villa located at 32–34 The Eyrie in Eaglemont, in the City of Banyule, in the northern suburbs of Melbourne, in Victoria, Australia. It is one of three neighbouring houses built by Harold Desbrowe-Annear, a leading Melbourne architect, in the Arts and Crafts style.

Built in 1904 on the traditional lands of the Wurundjeri people, the house was added to the Victorian Heritage Register on 18 April 1996 in recognition of its architectural significance; and, together with two adjacent houses, was also added to a non-statutory list by the Victorian branch of the National Trust on 26 March 1981, and to the now defunct Register of the National Estate on 22 June 1993.

== History ==
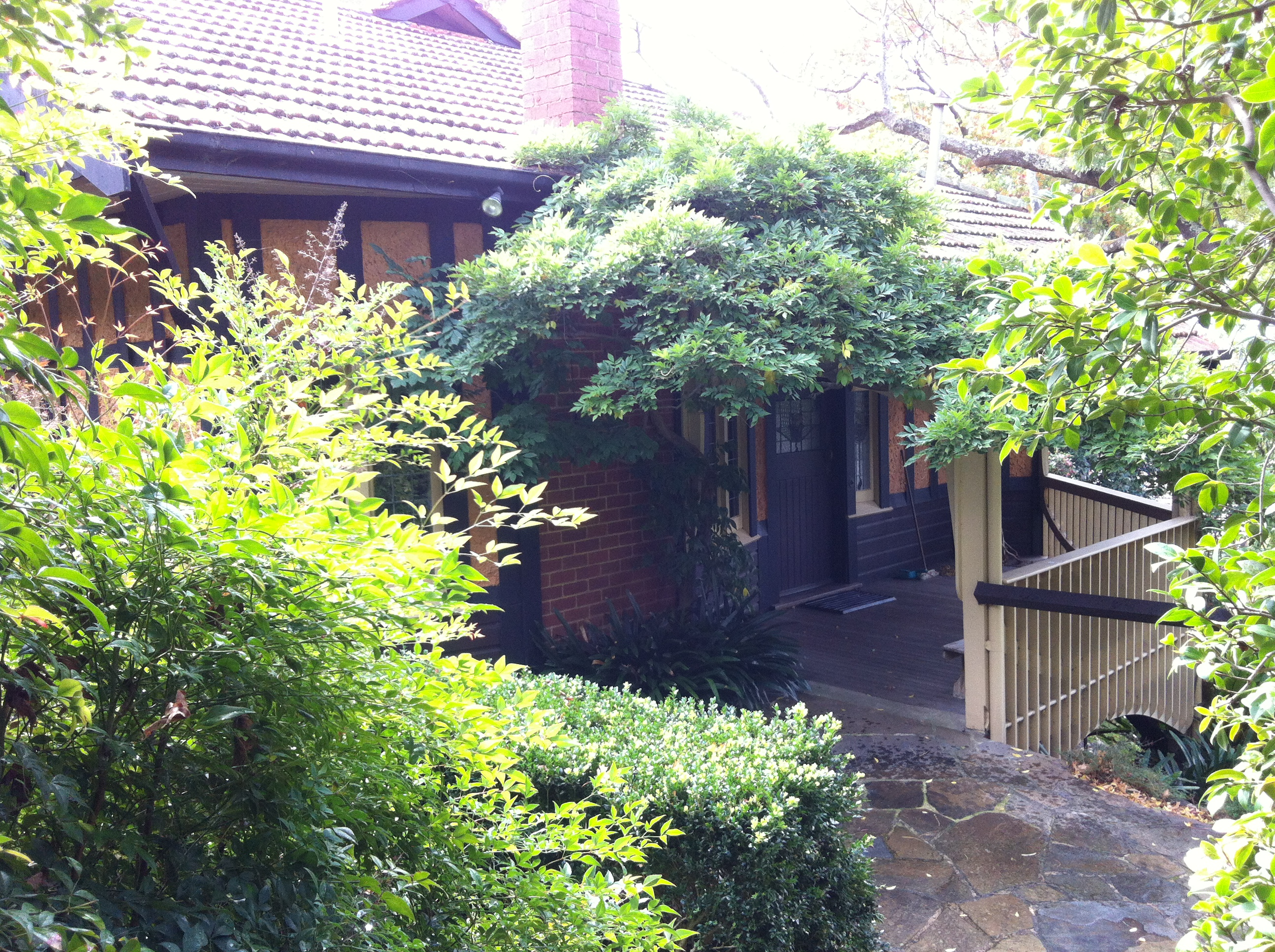
Entry to the house

At the time of purchase, the allotment location was on the rural urban fringe of Melbourne, on sloping site that provided extensive views over the Yarra Valley.

Chadwick House was built in 1904 for James Chadwick, the father-in-law of Desbrowe-Annear. Chadwick owned this house after its construction and leased it to a civil servant, Charles Stanesby, until he himself became the occupier in 1907. A later occupier was Arthur V. Walker. In addition to Chadwick House, at 32–34 The Eyrie, Desbrowe-Annear designed the two neighbouring houses, including his own house, at 36–38 The Eyrie, and Officer house, at 28–30 The Eyrie. (Note: Now addressed as 55 Outlook Drive.) Collectively, the three heritage-listed houses epitomise the Arts and Crafts Movement of which Desbrowe-Annear was an exponent and are especially notable as a trio. The house incorporated a number of design and technological innovations not the least of which was the open plan of the interior which still plays a significant role in the design of homes today.

The house has had many modifications both internally and externally from 1904 until 1988 when it was purchased by architect, Peter Crone. Crone subsequently undertook a ten-year restoration to return the house, as far as possible and with limited information, to its original condition. The three houses are all domestic dwellings, modest in size and built in an era when extensive architectural work was being done on public buildings and mansions. In recognition of Crone's restoration, in 2008 the house won the Victorian Chapter John George Knight Award for Heritage and then Australian Institute of Architects National Award for Heritage Architecture.

== Description ==
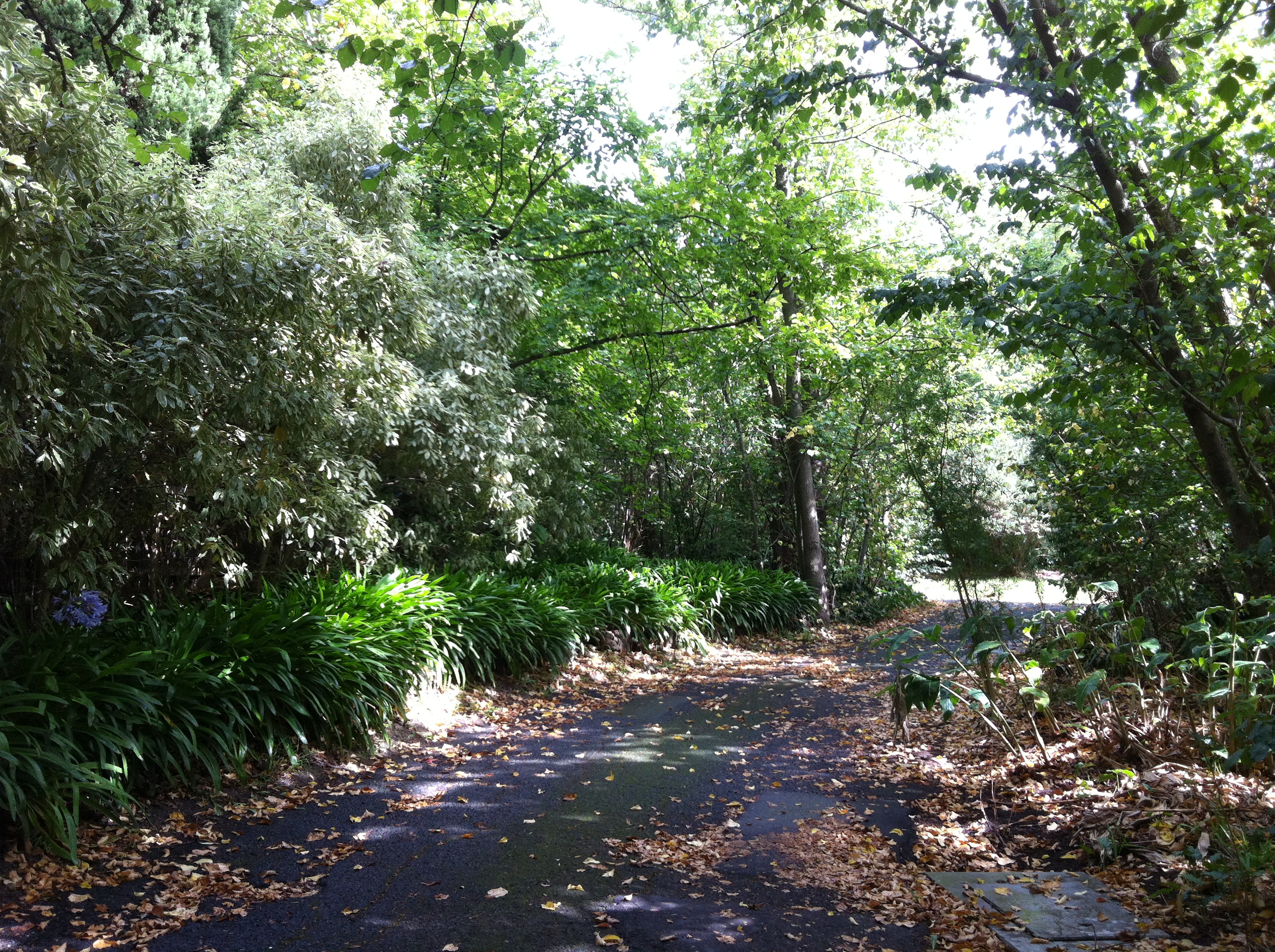
Driveway at the house

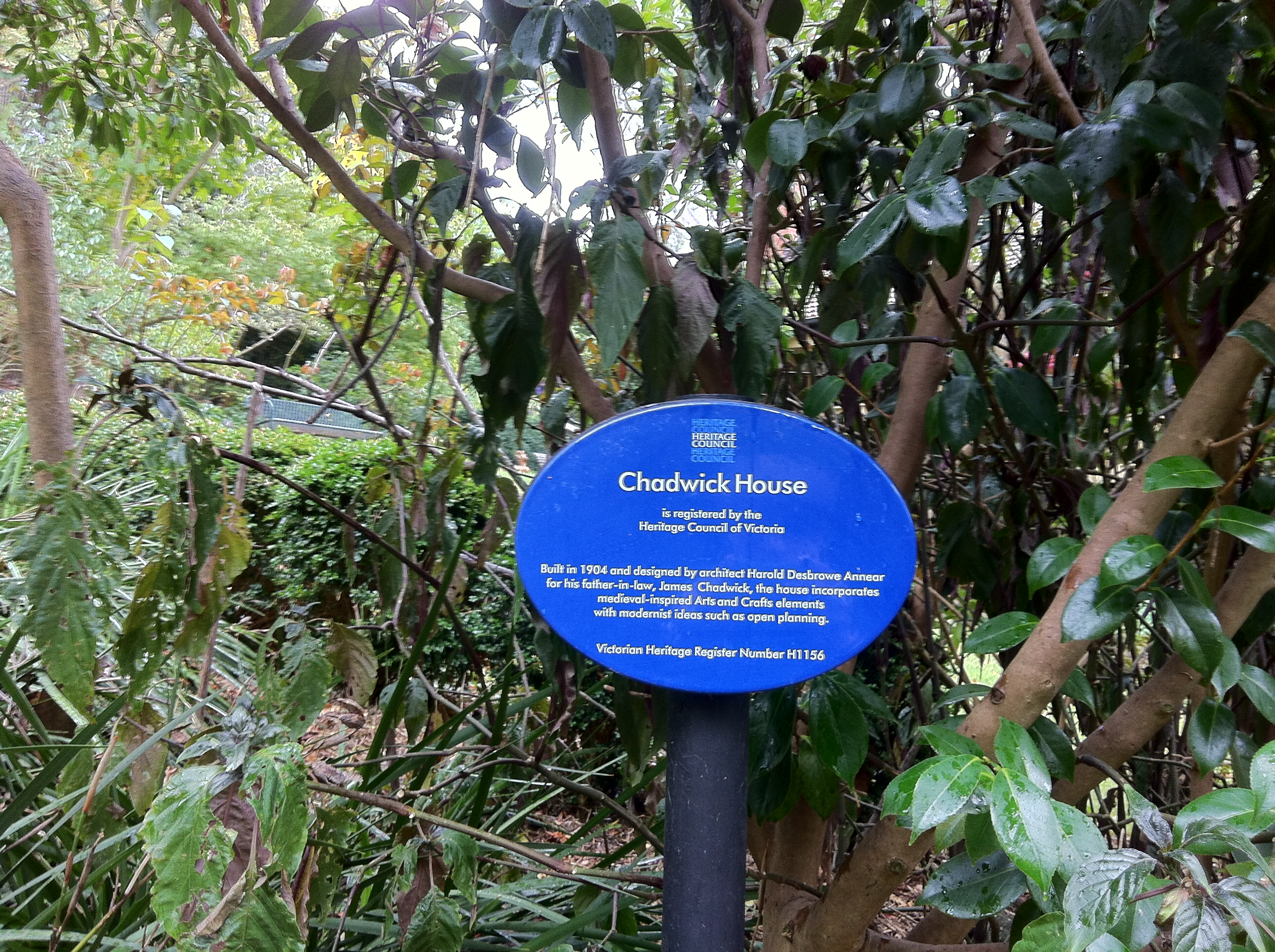
Victorian Heritage Register sign

The house is a two-storey, Medieval-inspired Arts and Crafts style building with half-timbered roughcast walls, a hipped and gabled Marseilles-patterned tile roof, arcaded chimney stacks and cantilevered gables. Internally the house has extensive timber panelling with built-in furniture and storage space. Chadwick House has the half-timbered rough-cast walls the hipped and gabled Marseilled-pattern tile roof arcaded chimney stacks and cantilevered gables. The swagged and ogee-arch slatted balustrading to its balconies and the overall picturesque disposition of elements have been borrowed from northern European 14th- and 15th-century domestic styles. These are exemplified in the white rough cast and black stained timbering (i.e. black and white houses) both internally and externally it may be seen as an early example of medieval revival style unique to the Heidelberg district.

Chadwick House is one of three houses that were built on land purchased by Desbrowe-Annear's father-in-law and the houses are still found today on The Eyrie and adjoining Outlook Drive. The two other houses of very similar design by Desbrowe-Annear. The three houses were sited to take advantage of the vista, ventilation, sunshine and a "healthy atmosphere" which were considered important to the design. Each of the houses is sited increasingly further back from the street so as not to block the view of the other.

One of the most striking features of Chadwick House is the two verandahs facing east and south-east overlooking the garden. The verandahs have an unusual double ox-bow balustrading. The tiled roof is a collection of gabled and hip roofs. The lower part of the house is clad with double beveled weatherboards while the upper part comprises rough cast panels separated by vertical timbers and this pattern is extended to the gables. The house exhibits many technological innovations including wall recessed, sliding window sashes, modular wall-framing and convection heating vents to the fireplaces. The large timber door which slides to conceal the front dining room is further evidence of the technical innovation employed in the house. The house has a balloon frame construction which was introduced to Australia from California in the mid-nineteenth century. The weatherboards and timber are charcoal grey, the verandah balustrades are yellow and the panels of rough cast are orange/ochre in colour.

The interior is an open plan design which at the time was a radical departure from contemporary designs. There is no extended hallway but rather a small entrance hall from which the main living areas are accessed. From these rooms there is access to the kitchen and bedrooms. The sloping site allowed two rooms to be built under the main house. Their initial use was as office space for Desbrowe-Annear. Much of the interior comprises dark stained timber with a raked timber lined ceiling and built-in joinery. Until 1988 much of the original timber work was lost under layers of paint and plaster or had been removed. The renovations took place over a ten-year period and endeavoured to restore the building to its original condition. In some cases appropriate timber had to be sourced to replace and repair the initial "improvements".

=== Key influences and design approach ===
Chadwick House reflects both the tenets of Gothic Revival Functionalism based in part of the writings of A. W. N. Pugin and the Arts and Crafts Movement. Chadwick House demonstrates the principles of William Morris in its material and structural honesty, awareness of functionalism and site and appreciation of fine craftsmanship. "Have nothing in your house that you do not know to be useful and believe to be beautiful."

Desbrowe-Annear was instrumental in introducing the open plan form into Australian domestic architecture and Chadwick House, along with 28–30 The Eyrie and 36–38 The Eyrie, is an early example of his work which demonstrates this Modernist doctrine. Through its incorporation of Modernist ideas and Medieval-inspired design principles, Chadwick House was influential in the development of the Art and Crafts movement in Australia and embodies the cultural dogma of domestic architecture in Australia through its utilisation of the open-plan form. Chadwick House is important as an intact and notable example of the work of Desbrowe-Annear and as one of the prototype forms which remained peculiar to his work.

== See also ==
- Architecture of Melbourne
- List of places on the Victorian Heritage Register in the City of Banyule
