= Desbrowe-Annear house =

Heritage-listed house in Melbourne, Victoria, Australia

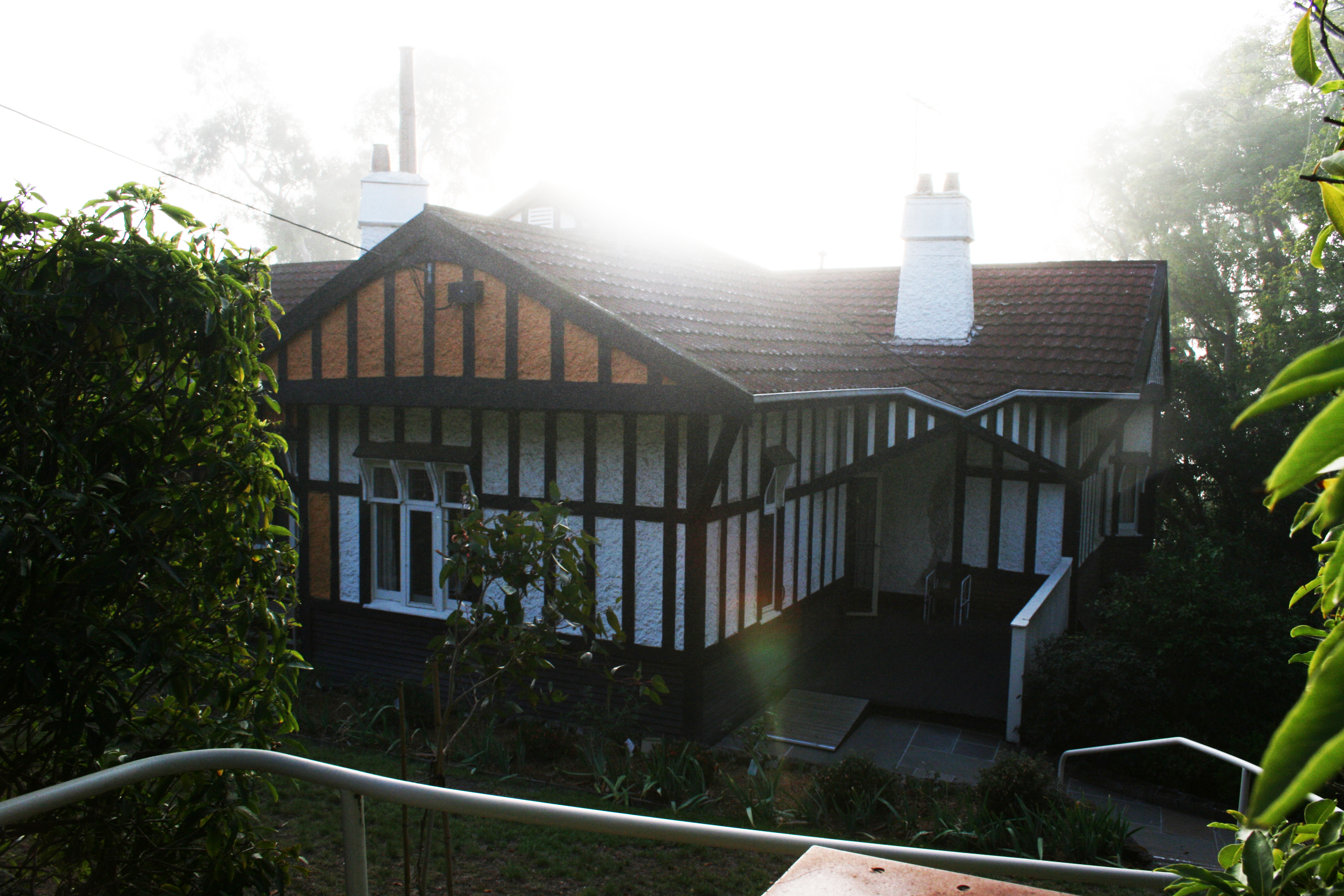
- The house in 2010

- Location of the house in Greater Metropolitan Melbourne
- Interactive map of the Desbrowe-Annear house area

General information
- Status: Completed
- Type: Villa
- Architectural style: Arts and Crafts
- Location: 36–38 The Eyrie, Eaglemont, City of Banyule, Melbourne, Victoria, Australia
- Coordinates: 37°45′56″S 145°03′46″E
- Completed: 1904; 122 years ago
- Client: Florence and Harold Desbrowe-Annear

Technical details
- Material: Bricks; timber

Design and construction
- Architect: Harold Desbrowe-Annear

Victorian Heritage Register
- Official name: Desbrowe Annear House
- Type: Registered place
- Designated: 21 July 2005
- Reference no.: H1009
- Heritage overlay no.: HO66
- Category: Residential buildings (private)

Register of the National Estate
- Official name: Residences and Grounds, 32–34, 36–38 The Eyrie, Eaglemont
- Type: Defunct register
- Designated: 22 June 1993
- Reference no.: 15710

The Desbrowe-Annear house is a villa located at 36–38 The Eyrie in Eaglemont, in the City of Banyule, in the northern suburbs of Melbourne, in Victoria, Australia. It is one of three neighbouring houses built by Harold Desbrowe-Annear, a leading Melbourne architect, in the Arts and Crafts style.

Built in 1904 on the traditional lands of the Wurundjeri people, the house was added to the Victorian Heritage Register on 21 July 2005 in recognition of its architectural and historical significance; and, together with two adjacent houses, was also added to a non-statutory list by the Victorian branch of the National Trust on 26 March 1981, and to the now defunct Register of the National Estate on 22 June 1993.

== History ==
Harold Desbrowe-Annear was one of Australia's leading and most innovative Arts and Crafts architects of the early twentieth century. The house at 36–38 The Eyrie, designed for himself and his wife Florence, is highly representative of the architect's work during this period, and is possibly his most inventive.

Desbrowe-Annear moved to Eaglemont in 1901 where he was able to develop his Arts and Crafts principles through a number of commissions. In addition to his own house, at 36–38 The Eyrie, Desbrowe-Annear designed the two neighbouring houses, including a house for his father-in-law, James Chadwick, at 32–34 The Eyrie, and Officer house, at 28–30 The Eyrie. (Note: Now addressed as 55 Outlook Drive.) Of the three houses, the Desbrowe-Annear house demonstrates the greatest attention to detail and contains a space in the downstairs area that was used as Desbrowe-Annear's studio. Collectively, the three heritage-listed houses epitomise the Arts and Crafts Movement of which Desbrowe-Annear was an exponent and are especially notable as a trio. The house incorporated a number of design and technological innovations not the least of which was the open plan of the interior which still plays a significant role in the design of homes today.

== Description ==
The house is a medium sized residence built on two levels utilising the fall of the land. Built in 1903, the Desbrowe-Annear house was built using a timber balloon frame and incorporates a number of elements for which Desbrowe-Annear is recognized. These include characteristic window designs, built in furniture, a square corner bay window, a verandah space cum outdoor living area that Annear called a piazza, the simple use of materials, the expression of structure and a planning layout that is a clear departure from the traditional layout of compartmentalised rooms off a linking hall way toward an open plan.

The house contains a higher degree of attention to detail than is usually found in his houses of this period. This is demonstrated by overlaid elements of the red pine fretwork as lintel ornamentation in the internal openings and in the work of the various brass door, overmantlesand sideboard fittings. The house exhibits an irregular though carefully realised external articulation which is the result of a design approach where the building's exterior was derived from its plan form.

== See also ==
- Architecture of Melbourne
- List of places on the Victorian Heritage Register in the City of Banyule
