= Officer house =

Heritage-listed house in Melbourne, Victoria, Australia

- Location of the house in Greater Metropolitan Melbourne
- Interactive map of the Officer house area

General information
- Status: Completed
- Type: Villa
- Architectural style: Arts and Crafts; Art Nouveau
- Location: 55 Outlook Drive, Eaglemont, City of Banyule, Melbourne, Victoria, Australia
- Coordinates: 37°45′56″S 145°03′49″E
- Completed: 1903; 123 years ago

Technical details
- Material: Bricks; timber

Design and construction
- Architect: Harold Desbrowe-Annear

Victorian Heritage Register
- Official name: Desbrowe Annear House
- Type: Registered place
- Designated: 14 September 2006
- Reference no.: H2082
- Heritage overlay no.: HO48
- Category: Residential buildings (private)

The Officer house is a villa located at 55 Outlook Drive (Note: Addressed as 28–30 The Eyrie, when built.) in Eaglemont, in the City of Banyule, in the northern suburbs of Melbourne, in Victoria, Australia. It is one of three neighbouring houses built by Harold Desbrowe-Annear, a leading Melbourne architect, in the Arts and Crafts style.

Built in 1903 on the traditional lands of the Wurundjeri people, the house was added to the Victorian Heritage Register on 14 September 2006 in recognition of its architectural significance; and, together with two adjacent houses, was also added to a non-statutory list by the Victorian branch of the National Trust on 26 March 1981.

== History ==
Built in 1903, 55 Outlook Drive, Eaglemont, is often referred to as the Officer house, after a George Officer who rented the house from James Chadwick from c. 1903. The house is a residence designed by Harold Desbrowe-Annear, one of Australia's leading and most innovative Arts and Crafts architects the early twentieth century. The house is highly representative of the architect's work during this period which was arguably his most inventive.

Annear moved to Eaglemont in 1901 where he was able to develop his Arts and Crafts principles through a number of commissions. In addition to the Officer house, at 55 Outlook Drive, Desbrowe-Annear designed the two neighbouring houses, including his own house, at 36–38 The Eyrie, and a house for his father-in-law, James Chadwick, at 32–34 The Eyrie. Collectively, the three heritage-listed houses epitomise the Arts and Crafts Movement of which Desbrowe-Annear was an exponent and are especially notable as a trio. The house incorporated a number of design and technological innovations not the least of which was the open plan of the interior which still plays a significant role in the design of homes today.

== Description ==
The Officer house is a medium-sized residence built on two levels utilising the fall of the land. The house was built using a timber balloon frame and incorporates a number of elements for which Desbrowe-Annear is recognized. These include characteristic window designs, built in furniture, a square corner bay window, a verandah space or outdoor living area that Desbrowe-Annear called a piazza and the simple use of materials, albeit in a highly decorative manner externally. The house exhibits a somewhat irregular though carefully realised external articulation which is the result of a design approach where the building's exterior was derived from its plan form.

In these Desbrowe-Annear was able to explore variations in concepts and detailing in a related collection of buildings. The house differs from the other two houses in this set with an approach to detailing and decoration that shows Art Nouveau influences and highly decorative pressed tin ceiling as opposed to exposed timber. The external surfaces of the house also display a greater level of decorative treatment than is apparent in the other two houses of the set. This includes a 'bottled' finish to smooth render as opposed to roughcast, timber strapwork that is purely decorative in nature rather than purely highlighting the underlying structure and the decorative friezes that are thought to give the building a 'Swiss Chalet' aesthetic. Where the other two houses in this set use a planning layout that is a clear departure from the traditional layout of compartmentalised rooms off a linking hall way toward an open plan, this house conforms to a more conventional planning layout.

== See also ==
- Architecture of Melbourne
- List of places on the Victorian Heritage Register in the City of Banyule
