= Harold Desbrowe-Annear =

Australian architect (1865–1933)

Harold Desbrowe Annear
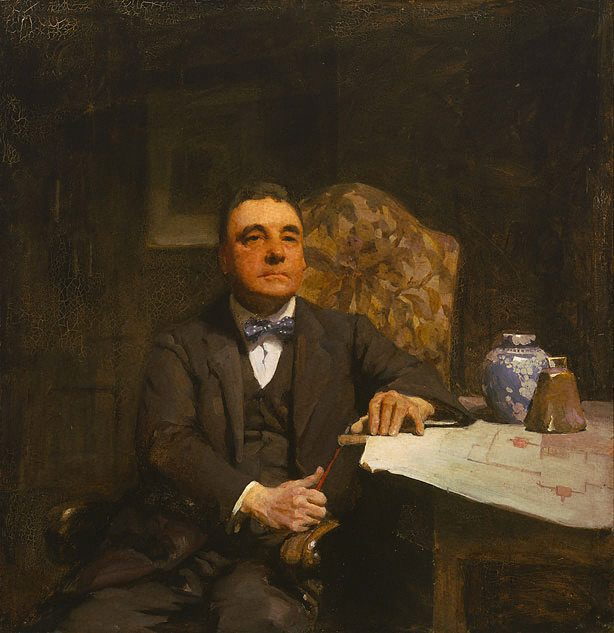
- Desbrow Annear by William Beckwith McInnes; portrait won the 1921 Archibald Prize
- Born: 16 August 1865; Happy Valley, Bendigo, Victoria, Australia
- Died: 22 June 1933 (aged 67)
- Occupation: Architect
- Spouse: Florence Susan Chadwick (m. 1891; sep. 1918)
- Children: 2

Harold Desbrowe Annear (16 August 1865 – 22 June 1933) was an influential Australian architect who was at the forefront of the development of the Arts and Crafts movement in the country. During the 1890s he was an instructor in architecture at the Working Men's College (now RMIT University) where he founded the T-Square in 1900. The club acted as a meeting point for Melbourne's architects, artists and craft workers and helped to develop a strong Arts and Crafts culture in the city. Desbrowe Annear was also a supporter of the Victorian Arts and Crafts Society, founded in 1908.

== Personal life ==
=== Early life and education ===
Born in Happy Valley, Bendigo, in 1865, Desbrowe Annear was the elder son of James Annear, mining contractor, and Eliza Ann (née Hawkins). He had six older stepsisters, two sisters and a brother. After the family moved to Melbourne in 1875 Desbrowe Annear attended Hawthorn Grammar School, matriculating in 1882. On 25 July 1891, he married Florence Susan Chadwick but by the end of World War I, due to irreconcilable differences, they had separated.

=== Practices ===
In 1883, Desbrowe Annear was articled to Melbourne architect William Salway and during this time his interest and knowledge of architecture grew extensively. In 1889 he chose to pursue a practice of his own having already received recognition for his architectural sketches and papers delivered to the Victorian Institute of Architects. During the 1890s he became an advocate of the Arts and Crafts movement and he established the T-Square Club on an Arts and Crafts agenda of collaborative work and the promotion of the building crafts. He was sympathetic to the theory of a 'democratic architecture' which underpins his most recognised work, the Eaglemont houses (1903) as well as his journal For Every Man his Home (1922) which expressed the idea of domestic Australian architecture suitable for everyone.

=== Death ===
Desbrowe Annear died on 22 June 1933 of heart disease; he was survived by Florence, whom he had not divorced, and their two sons James and Hector.

=== The Harold Desbrowe Annear Award ===
In 1996, The Royal Australian Institute of Architects introduced the Harold Desbrowe Annear Award to the best residential project of the year in Victoria. It is the highest honour in the state for Residential Architecture.

== Notable projects ==
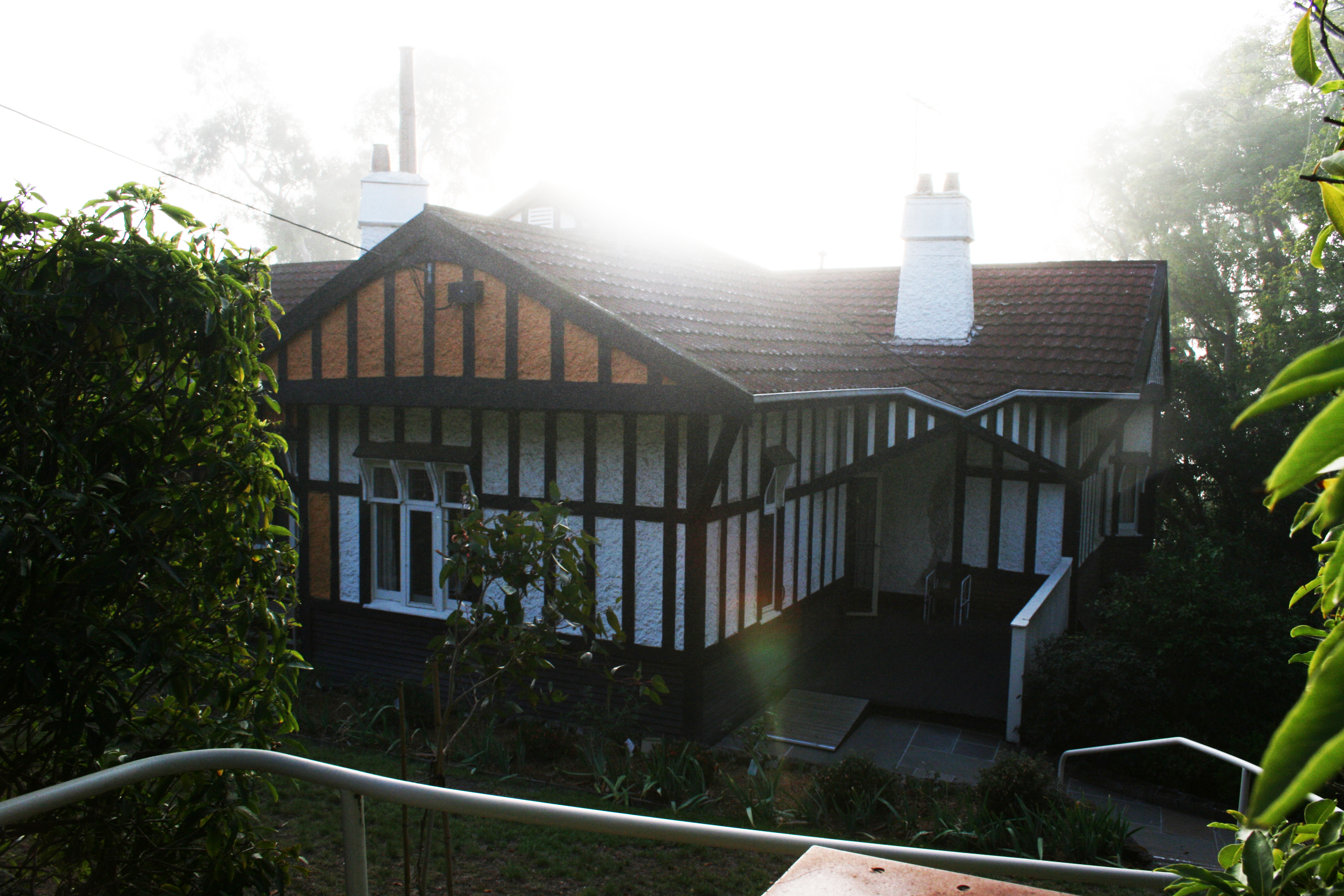
36–38 The Eyrie

=== Federation Arch, Princes Bridge 1901 ===
The ephemeral triumphal arch erected on Princes Bridge by the City of Melbourne was designed by Desbrowe Annear in 1901 to mark the visit of the Duke and Duchess of York for the Federation celebrations. It was influenced by Beaux-Arts civic design and the 'Arc de Triomphe' in Paris.

=== Chadwick Houses, Eaglemont, 1903 ===
The three houses that Desbrowe Annear erected in Eaglemont were commissioned by his father-in-law James Chadwick in 1903. They were his own house at 36–38 The Eyrie; 32–34 The Eyrie, known as Chadwick House and 55 Outlook Drive, known as the Officer house. While relatively modest in size, their design indicates that the architect was prepared to grasp the issue of the "small home" as one of the most challenging of the 20th century. They embody the principles of William Morris in their truth to materials and place, structural 'honesty', functionalism and celebration of the builder's craft. They are weatherboard with rough cast and half-timbering and exhibit many technological innovations including wall recessed, sliding window sashes, modular wall-framing and convection heating vents to fireplaces. Each house was thoughtfully positioned on the slope of the hill, with increasing setbacks from the street, so as not to block the views from within.

=== Springthorpe Memorial, Booroondara Cemetery, Kew, 1897–1900 ===
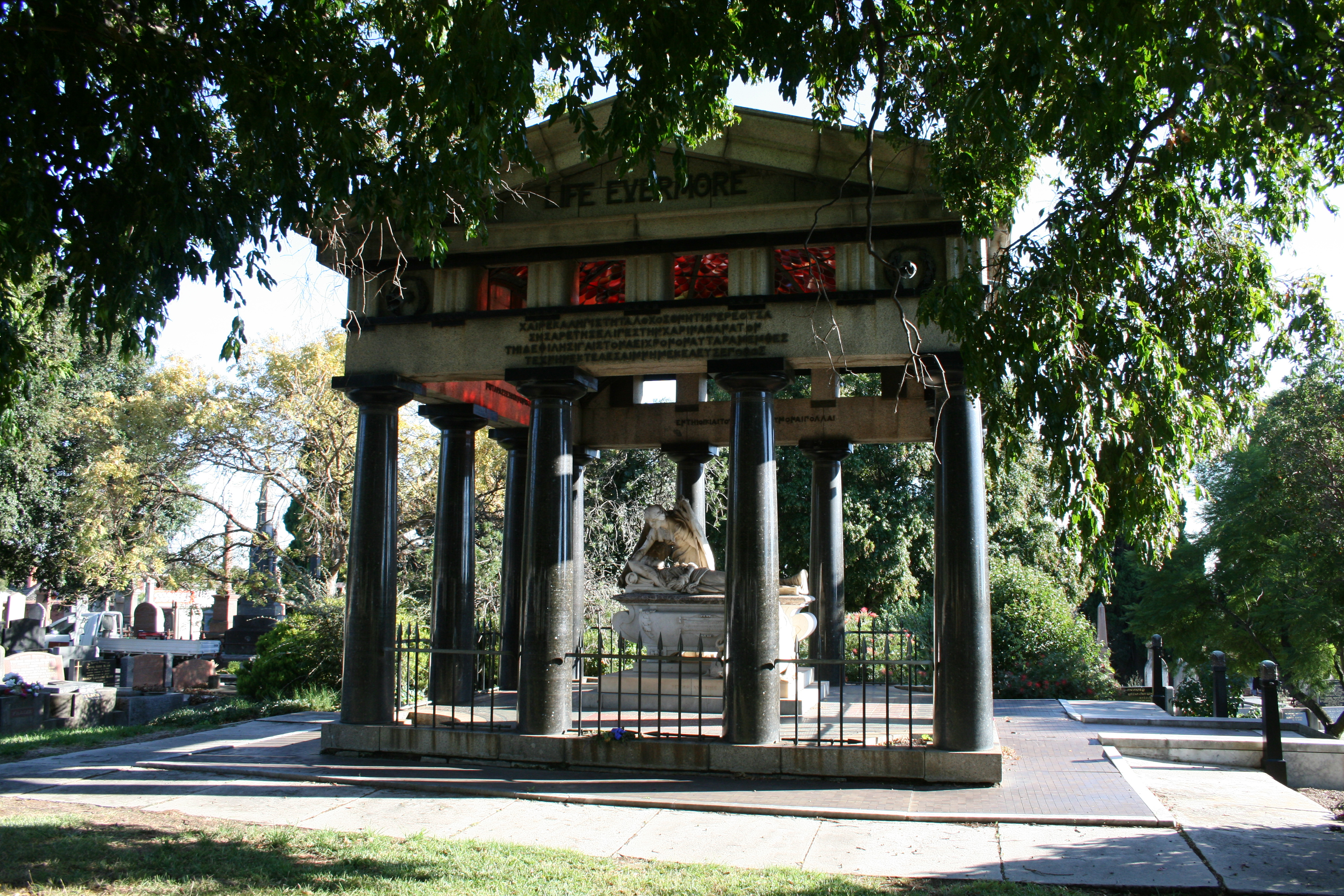
Springthorpe Memorial, Booroondara Cemetery

The Springthorpe Memorial in the Boroondara Cemetery, Kew, was Desbrowe Annear's first Arts and Crafts venture. The design was influenced by William Lethaby's writings on the iconography of the domed temple form in "Architecture: Mysticism & Myth". Consequentially the architecture is symbolic. The geographic alignment of the tomb ascertains that the intense light of the afternoon sun lights up the temple with brilliant colour. It explores the idea of the hoped-for union of souls.

=== Inglesby, South Yarra, 1915 ===
Inglesby, also called the Francis house, in South Yarra was one of Desbrowe Annear's most famous houses, identified by Robin Boyd as an example of Melbourne's 'pioneer modernism'. It was timber-framed with plain white roughcast walls inspired by Californian architect Irving Gill. The plan of Inglesby centred on a large hall entered from the porch. It was flanked either side by the dining room and the living room accessed through sliding doors which when opened extended into a huge living area across the front of the house. Inglesby's low ceilings and horizontal flow aligned it also to the work of Frank Lloyd Wright.

=== Heritage-listed projects ===
Victorian Heritage Register

The following buildings and structures, designed entirely or in part by Desbrowe-Annear, are listed on the Victorian Heritage Register:

- Tintern (1855), 10 Tintern Avenue, Toorak – a single-storey mansion built for William Westgarth. The oldest part of the house is a ten-room portable iron dwelling, manufactured by W. and P. McLellan.
- Springthorpe Memorial, Boroondara Cemetery (1897), High Street, Kew
- Beleura (c. 1900s), 42–44 Kalimna Drive, Mornington – built in the 1860s as one of several summer retreats along the Mornington Peninsula; with Desbrowe-Annear designing a formal pool in the early twentieth century
- Ancestral Hall, See Yup Temple (1901), 76 Raglan Street, South Melbourne
- Cranlana (1903), 62 Clendon Road, Toorak – the garden was developed by Sir Sidney Myer and his wife, Dame Merlyn Myer, and remains in the Myer family, occupied by the Cranlana Center for Ethical Leadership.
- East View (1903), 16 Martin Street, Heidelberg – a medium-sized residence built on two levels that utilise the fall of the land.
- Officer house (1903), 55 Outlook Drive, Eaglemont – substantially intact, it is one of three houses constructed on the Eaglemont Estate, built for James Chadwick, rented to the Officer family.
- Chadwick House (1904), 32–34 The Eyrie, Heidelberg – substantially intact, it is one of three houses constructed on the Eaglemont Estate, built for Desbrowe-Annear's father-in-law, James Chadwick.
- Desbrowe-Annear house (1904), 36–38 The Eyrie, Eaglemont – substantially intact, it is one of three houses constructed on the Eaglemont Estate
- Macgeorge house (1911), 25 Riverside Road, Ivanhoe – a substantial bungalow, also known as Fairy Hills, is situated at the intersection of the Yarra River and Darebin Creek, and was originally "Ballangeich", the home of prominent artist and critic Norman Macgeorge
- Donald Shire Offices (1911), 31 McCulloch Street, Donald, designed in conjunction with Gerald Ryan and Harold Ernest Bunnett.
- Mulberry Hill (1920), 385 Golf Links Road, Langwarrin South – the home of Sir Daryl (1889–1976) and Joan Lindsay (died 1984), gifted to the National Trust and open as a living history museum.
- Church Street Bridge (1924), Church Street, in both Cremorne and Richmond and Chapel Street, South Yarra
- Longacres (1924), 15 Range Road, Olinda – a house and gallery, a painting studio, a caretakers residence and several outbuildings arranged in an informal garden on c.2 hectares (5 acres).
- Westerfield (1924), 72–118 Robinsons Road, Frankston South – a 45-hectare (110-acre) property purchased in 1920 by Russell and Mabel Grimwade as a farm and rural retreat, in an area which became popular in the 1920s for the holiday houses.
- Delgany (1927), 3809–3819 Point Nepean Road, Portsea – a large limestone building with prominent castellated parapets and towers; converted into St Mary's School for the Deaf, a hotel, and subsequently a luxury residential estate.
- Malwarra (1927), 6 Sherbrooke Road, Sherbrooke
- Katanga (1933), 372 Glenferrie Road, Malvern – built for Wesley Ince and his wife, just before Desbrowe-Annear's death.

Other heritage lists

The following buildings and structures, designed entirely or in part by Desbrowe-Annear, are listed on other heritage lists or databases:

- Peroomba House (c. 1900s), 80–82 Castle Street, Heidelberg – a typical, though not as distinguished, example of the Arts and Crafts style.
- Springdale (1905), 190 Gwyther Siding Road, Leongatha South – the former Martin residence;
- Heidelberg Shire Offices and Library (1908), 60 Beverley Road, Heidelberg
- Stanhope (c. 1910), 10 Peter Street, Eltham
- Arundel (1911), 10 Chastleton Avenue, Toorak
- Allanvale (1919), 1334 Western Highway, Great Western – has significance as a moderately intact example of a 19th-century sheep station.
- The Gair House (c. 1920s), 7 Muriel Street, Glen Iris
- Miegunyah House (c. 1920s), 641 Orrong Road, Toorak, built from the 1850s and remodelled by Desbrowe-Annears during the 1920s
- House, 234 Rosanna Road (c. 1920s), Rosanna – of considerable architectural significance and it is externally largely intact.
- Sallman House (1922), 104 Kooyong Road, Armadale
- Whernside (1929, Serlian screen), 2A Whernside Avenue, Toorak, built in 1876 and remodelled during the 20th century, including by Desbrowe-Annears in 1929.
- Lear House and Surgery (1933), 572 Plenty Road, Preston

Other major projects, not heritage-listed

- Triumphal Arch (1901), Princes Bridge, Melbourne
- Cruden Farm (c. 1929), Cranhaven Road, Langwarrin – commissioned by Sir Keith Murdoch after his marriage to Elisabeth Greene, to enlarge and modernise the original Edwardian house; the renovation far exceeded the brief.
