= Gumnuts (cottage) =

Heritage-listed cottage in Melbourne, Victoria, Australia

- Location of the cottage in Greater Metropolitan Melbourne

General information
- Status: Completed
- Type: Cottage
- Location: 619 Nepean Highway, Frankston South, City of Frankston, Melbourne, Victoria, Australia
- Coordinates: 38°09′33″S 145°06′17″E
- Completed: 1922; 104 years ago

Technical details
- Structural system: Knitlock
- Material: Precast concrete; corrugated iron; timber

Design and construction
- Architect: Walter Burley Griffin

Victorian Heritage Register
- Official name: Gumnuts Cottage
- Type: Registered place
- Designated: 14 August 1997
- Reference no.: H1328
- Heritage overlay no.: HO24
- Category: Residential buildings (private)

Register of the National Estate
- Official name: Gumnuts
- Type: Defunct register
- Designated: 30 June 1992
- Reference no.: 9627

Gumnuts is a cottage located at 619 Nepean Highway in Frankston South, in the City of Frankston, in the south eastern suburbs of Melbourne, in Victoria, Australia.

Built in 1922 on the traditional lands of the Bunurong people, the house was added to the Victorian Heritage Register on 14 August 1997 in recognition of its architectural significance; and was also added to non-statutory lists by the Victorian branch of the National Trust on 3 February 1983 and the now defunct Register of the National Estate on 30 June 1992.

== History ==
In 1922, Walter Burley Griffin built twin Knitlock cottages as holiday homes, most likely for W. A Fowler, with Gumnuts situated at the front of the allotment and Marnham, situated at the rear. Marnham was demolished by its owner, Mr Brew, in 1983.

Other houses built in the area using the knitlock system included the much larger Stokesay, designed by James Frederick Wilson (Frederick) Ballantyne, an employee of Burley Griffin, and the Burley Griffin's own house, Pholiota, in Eaglemont.

== Description ==
Gumnuts is a one-roomed cottage designed by Walter Burley Griffin in 1919 and was built in 1922. The small pyramidal structure was built as the prototype example of the patented knitlock system, developed by Griffin as a response to housing shortages after World War I. It conforms to Griffin's principles regarding his segmental architecture, being built to a modular ribbed design, with the knitlock wall segments interlocked vertically and horizontally with staggered internal and external joints. The structure was made using concrete wall segments and cement single roofing tiles, interlocked in straight courses to result in very thin two ply walls. Special square concrete roof tiles laid on the diagonal were also used. The Gumnuts cottage is a small square structure with hipped roof and simple casement windows, planked doors, unpainted walls and dark matt green timber staining which are characteristic of knitlock houses. Internally there is a low pyramidal ceiling over a central living space surrounded by sleeping and reading alcoves, an entrance lobby, a bathroom and a kitchen.

The 1.1-metre (3.5 ft) modular design gave standardised window and door openings of 0.76 metres (2.5 ft). The internal wall surfaces required no veneer of tiles, plaster, textile, paper, enamel or paint (except for decorative purposes).

The cottage may have been used by Griffin and his wife as a seaside retreat. Knitlock as a building system was used by Griffin from 1919 until he left Australia for India in 1935. It was also used by some other architects in Australia for a short time. There have some alterations to the fabric of Gumnuts and a modern house has been built on the same block.

== See also ==
- Architecture of Melbourne
- List of places on the Victorian Heritage Register in the City of Frankston
- List of buildings by Walter Burley Griffin
