= Duncan House, Castlecrag =

Duncan House
- Location within Sydney Location within Australia
- 33°48′17″S 151°13′10″E
- Location: 8 The Barbette, Castlecrag, City of Willoughby, New South Wales, Australia

History
- Built: 1934
- Built for: Frank and Anice Duncan

Site notes
- Architect: Walter Burley Griffin

New South Wales Heritage Register
- Official name: Duncan House; Duncan House Number 2
- Type: State heritage (built)
- Designated: 2 April 1999
- Reference no.: 742
- Type: House
- Category: Residential buildings (private)

Duncan House is a heritage-listed residence located at 8 The Barbette, Castlecrag, New South Wales, a suburb of Sydney, Australia. It was designed by Walter Burley Griffin. It is also known as Duncan House Number 2. It was added to the New South Wales State Heritage Register on 2 April 1999.

== History ==
=== Walter Burley Griffin (1876-1937) ===
Walter Burley Griffin was born near Chicago and trained at Nathan Ricker's School of Architecture at the University of Illinois, graduating in 1899. From 1901-1906, he worked as an associate of Frank Lloyd Wright at Oak Park. Griffin started his own practice in 1906 and within a few years established his reputation as an architect of the Prairie School. In 1911, Griffin married Marion Mahony, who had graduated in architecture from the Massachusetts Institute of Technology and worked as Wright's head designer.

Inspired by the designs by Frederick Law Olmsted (often called the founder of American landscape architecture) of New York's Central Park and his "green necklace" of parks in Boston, landscape design was the career Walter Burley Griffin would have pursued had the opportunity offered. He had approached Chicago landscape gardener Ossian Cole Simonds for career advice before entering the University of Illinois in 1895. Apparently unsatisfied with the lack of relevant curriculum, Simonds urged him to pursue architecture and study landscape gardening on his own, as he himself had done. Griffin took what classes he could and, like Simonds and landscape gardener Jens Jensen, shared an approach to landscape design through architecture, an interest in civic design, urbanism and planning.

In 1902 there were only six "landscape gardeners" (and no landscape architects) listed in the Lakeside Annual Directory of the City of Chicago. In 1912 only two landscape architects and 13 landscape gardeners were listed. Griffin's practice as a landscape architect was first featured in a public text in Wilhelm Miller's The Prairie Spirit in Landscape Gardening (1915), which included Griffin as an exponent (along with Jensen, Simonds and architect Frank Lloyd Wright) of his proposed American regional "Prairie" style. Simonds, Griffin and Miller had all attended the first national meeting of the American Society of Landscape Architects (ASLA) in 1913 in Chicago.

By 1914 Griffin and his architect wife Marion Mahony had moved to Australia after winning the 1912 international design competition for the Federal Capital, Canberra with a scheme based on its topography, a distinctly non-prairie valley landscape of undulating hills. This was a project they had worked on together. By 1919, there were problems with the Canberra project and Griffin resigned his position as Federal Capital Director of Design and Construction. He then formed the Greater Sydney Development Association to purchase 263 hectares (650 acres) in Middle Harbour, which became known as Castlecrag. He devoted the next fifteen years to developing and promoting the area, while maintaining an architectural practice.

Griffin believed dwellings should play a subordinate role in the scheme of nature. His houses were small and intimate. He aimed toward the most natural use of land and the selection of indigenous plants. He also developed an economical construction system of pre-cast interlocking structural tiles, which he called "Knitlock", and used it widely, as well as stone, in the houses of Castlecrag. In the early 1930s, Griffin built incinerators for the destruction of household garbage in various cities and suburbs in the eastern states of Australia. They provided a canvas for experimentation with form and texture for the architect, but sadly few have survived. Two Griffin incinerators survive in suburban Sydney: the Glebe Municipal Incinerator (City of Sydney Local Environmental Plan 2000 local heritage item); and the Walter Burley Griffin Incinerator, Willoughby (State Heritage Register (SHR) listing #84).

Griffin's work took him to India in 1935 and he died there two years later of peritonitis.

Griffin's contribution to the development of the Wrightian / Prairie School style internationally has begun to receive attention from architectural historians in recent years. It is now increasingly acknowledged that Griffin contributed a number of fresh concepts to the Prairie School, most noticeably: his attention to vertical space (a development leading directly to the ubiquitous split-level style post-war houses); "open plan" living and dining areas dominated by a large central fireplace; and the extensive domestic use of reinforced concrete.

Griffin is also internationally renowned for his work as a landscape architect, especially the innovative town planning design of Canberra and Castlecrag, Griffith and Leeton.

Griffin's design approaches to landscape and architecture informed one another. Landscape itself, for example, crucially served as a basis for architecture - a conviction first made explicit in the Canberra publicity, Griffin noting (in Chicago) that: "...a building should ideally be "the logical outgrowth of the environment in which [it is] located"." In Australia, he hoped to "evolve an indigenous type, one similarly derived from and adapted to local climate, climate and topography." In Australia the scale and number of his landscape commissions grew considerably, including a number of town plans. Griffin signed many of his drawings with the term "landscape architect".

==== Background and vision ====
Walter Burley Griffin and Marion Mahony Griffin came to Sydney in 1920 following his seven years overseeing the building of the nation's Federal Capital at Canberra, during which time they lived primarily in Melbourne. They had come to Australia after he won the capital design competition of 1912, this being a project they had worked on together. In the USA the Griffins had both worked for Frank Lloyd Wright. Marion was known for her drawings and interiors while Walter had become a respected practitioner of the organic architecture later known as the Prairie School.

For the north shore of Sydney Harbour the Griffins envisaged a communal, ideal community without fences, without steeply pitched red roofs, and without the grid pattern which dominated the landscape in most of Sydney's suburbs. Mahony and Burley Griffin were visionaries and followed philosophical-spiritual movements such as Theosophy and Anthroposophy (Australian Dictionary of Biography). With a group of people, they formed the Greater Sydney Development Association (GSDA).

In 1921 this group (GSDA) purchased 263 hectares (650 acres) of undeveloped land along the waterfront of present-day Castlecrag, Castle Cove and Middle Cove. Here the Griffins could design their community with curving roads following the sandstone topography. Griffin had extensive experience at town planning, having designed estates and developed suburban areas in the United States as well as plans for other Australian towns.

They names the roads of the Castlecrag subdivision after parts of castles. Scottish castle themes in the area were already evoked in the Gothic stone bridge, built 1892, between the suburbs of Cammeray and Northbridge, and at the previously named "Edinburgh Rock" on the Castlecrag peninsula.

=== Indigenous background ===
The indigenous people of the area were Kurinngai or Gurinngai speaking groups, probably affiliated with the nearby Cammeraigal community or the Gorualgal settlement at Fig-Tree Point close to Middle Harbour. Kurinngai groups lived for thousands of years successfully utilising and managing the area's rich resources of fish, mammals, birds and vegetable products. Kurinngai communities suffered from colonial diseases such as smallpox, and drastically lost population after the arrival of Anglo-Europeans in 1788. Reminders of the Kurinngai's original occupation are evident in the landscape around Middle Harbour: middens, scarred trees, initiation sites, and especially dramatic rock carvings.

The government took over traditional Aboriginal land and eventually sold it as land grants. Some Kurinngai survivors may have integrated with colonial society. Governor Macquarie established "Bungaree's Farm" at Middle Head not far from Castlecrag to introduce indigenous people to European farming. Up until 1879 an Aboriginal group was living at the west side of Circular Quay, but at that time the people were relocated to La Perouse.

=== Castlecrag building ===
The north shore of the Harbour was more lightly populated by settlers than the Sydney side. It was unsuitable for grazing, and the rocky terrain around Middle Harbour probably was deemed difficult to build on.

The Griffins' plans included retaining natural landforms and Australian bush plants, and planting additional native flora. Roofs were to be low, and views of the harbour maximised from all areas. Communal walkways and reserves were included, and community activities such as dance classes, concerts and neighbourhood meetings were encouraged. The Griffins lived in Castlecrag from 1924 to 1936. Designs within the estate had to have GSDA approval and Walter Burley Griffin designed the majority of them. Banks would not lend for his designs which made construction of the dream community difficult, and less than two dozen houses out of potentially several hundred were realised in the planned form. Apparently only thirteen houses remain.

The design of the houses emphasised use of stone and sand-coloured concrete, mostly low to the ground, mimicking and complementing natural earth forms. Griffin patented a material called knitlock concrete which is used in the Duncan House. It was manufactured locally, in moulded sections which join together in a kind of jigsaw fitting. Apparently the Duncan House, being the last Griffin designed house in Castlecrag to be built, benefitted from a later advancement of knitlock technology which included the galvanising process (zinc coating) in its iron-steel reinforcement. This technology contributed to its long-term success compared to some of the other houses which were built in the Castlecrag Estate between 1922 and 1934.

During his time at Castlecrag Griffin was known for his design of many municipal incinerator buildings, executed with grand and monumental flourishes. Following 1935, Walter and Marion moved to India where he designed and built several buildings. He died there in 1937. Marion returned briefly to Castlecrag then to the United States.

=== The Duncan House Plan ===
The Duncan House was built for Mr and Mrs Frank and Anice Duncan who had lived in other Griffin designed houses. Initially they purchased Lot 190 and commissioned a design for a split level stone house. The cost looked too high so they exchanged the lot for Lot 194 and the present house was built. The design of the house played on gothic castle themes. Mr Duncan the original owner lived in the house for over 50 years until 1989.

The Depression had its hold over New South Wales in the 1930s. The square plan Duncan House followed Griffin's composition idea of a house as a nucleus which could be added to as financial strain was eased. Over the decades Frank Duncan and his family added some extensions to suit their needs: a bedroom, a garage, and loggia (outdoor covered patio area), modest in scale, and in materials harmonising with the original house.

=== Duncan House leads to founding of the Walter Burley Griffin Society ===
Frank Duncan was an active member of the local community. He was a long term president of the Progress Association in the 1940s. He and his wife Anice worked with other community members to help establish the Castlecrag Kindergarten, and they were prominent members of the Bushwalkers Association. Their shared interest in bushwalking led them to close association with the Griffins.

When Mr Duncan revealed in 1988 that he was intending to sell the house and move, the local community wished to preserve his house as a house museum. Mr Duncan supported the idea, and government bodies gave indications that if a locally formed group would operate the museum, then funds could be made available for its purchase. The house received an Interim Conservation Order in 1989.

Thus the Duncan House was the inspiration for the formation of The Walter Burley Griffin Society Incorporated. The house was felt to be possibly the best preserved of Griffin's surviving houses. It was unpainted, and the kitchen and bathroom were original. At auction time, funds were not available for its purchase after all and the house sold to a private owner. The Society went on to achieve other successes, substantially raising awareness of the work of Walter Burley Griffin and Marion Mahony Griffin. A drawing of the Duncan House, by John Llewellyn, features on the masthead of the Society Newsletter. A Permanent Conservation Order was placed on the house in 1993. New extensions have been added to the house following that date. A number of elements of Mr Duncan's house as he left it in 1989 have been modernised. In the 1990s Willoughby Local Government Area designated the Griffin Conservation Area which includes the area of the Duncan House.

== Description ==
=== Setting ===
The original house was set at the back of the block, adjoining a reserve. According to the Walter Burley Griffin Society, and thesis extracts from Andre Perl, the Duncan house forms part of a group of three Griffin-designed houses at The Barbette. The other two are the Wilson and Creswick houses, No. 2 and No. 4. The three were designed with staggered settings to allow views of Middle Harbour. The Duncan House had access to the roof from the garden and views were enjoyed from there during Mr Duncan's residency until 1989.

=== Materials ===
The house is single storey, built of stone blocks and "knitlock" concrete blocks. The knitlock is reinforced with galvanised iron/steel, the galvanising being a late development in knitlock reinforcing. Burley Griffin's design was a small house with a square plan. Corner piers of rock faced sandstone rubble, squared and coursed, contrast with recessed walls of smooth dressed concrete blocks of a sandstone-gold colour (finished with grains of sandstone). The roof is flat with no eaves, and the window openings are rectangular with painted timber framing. Paired casement windows with large panes of rhomboid shaped glass, and french doors with panes of the same design open to the garden. Closeness to the garden and nature were integral elements of the house design, and Walter Burley Griffin himself contributed specimens of Australian flora for planting throughout Castlecrag.

=== Style ===
The knitlock wall sections have curved ribbing similar to vertical fins, which are accented by ribbed concave crenellations. The crenellated parapet elements rise above the roofline, bringing a castle or church-like suggestion to the exterior through gothic style elements. The 70 degree angled window pane settings create chevron patterns on the french doors and windows, adding further decorative interest to the facade, and reminiscent of a pointed arch motif (another gothic style marker). Chevron motifs and vertical fins are also characteristic of the Inter War Art Deco style, but Burley Griffin's use of rusticated stone and his philosophy of creating a building in harmony with the landscape resulted in a fusion of grace with earthy ambience at the Duncan House.

=== Interior ===
The interior has timber floors which are laid on a prepared subfloor surface to Griffin's specification. Interior walls are unlined rock-faced stone at the corners to original square building, and smoother concrete knitlock blocks in the remaining walls. Ceilings are plaster lined and were originally painted white, but are now an ochre colour. According to James Birrell's book, the small scale of the Duncan House achieved a large scale interior through the use of folding doors, which could join smaller rooms into a larger living area. The building has a square bedroom extension added to the rear of the house, designed by Eva Buhrich and sympathetically constructed in 1943 from unpainted blocks of concrete with plain painted timber window frames. In the early 1990s, the windows were replaced with new ones matching the Griffin chevron design.

A simple fireplace was situated in the corner of the living area. It utilised the rock faced stone as a hearth wall, and had a rough stone mantel. The original bathroom had green fittings that were in situ in 1989, but were replaced in 1993. The original bathroom floor tile - a mosaic - was also replaced in 1993. The kitchen sink is a double bowl style made of zinc and it and the original kitchen cabinetry remain intact. The flooring in the kitchen was replaced in 1993.

=== Deterioration ===
The flat roof was made from poured concrete. Water drained into internal downpipes. These leaked internally, and water also damaged the crenellations and elements of the exterior. Extensive repairs were carried out in 1993 in the original Griffin house and 1943 extension due to leaks having caused water damage to stone, concrete and timber. In order to safeguard the structural integrity of the roof, a steel structure was constructed inside the house to hold it up and a new ceiling attached to its underside. A slightly sloped metal roof was constructed in 1993 discretely on top of the original concrete roof to protect the house from continued issues with rain ingress. The house remains watertight. The current windows are replacements to the same design as the originals.

=== Recent works ===
The non-Griffin designed garage and loggia built post World War II from rock faced stone blocks, which were extant at the front or street-side of the Duncan house in 1989, were built close to the excavated earth of the slope. The additions to the house from c. 1993 have been built in the place of the old garage and loggia.

The extension brings the house forward toward the street, and the carport fronts onto the street. The extension and carport have been designed with reference to the original house, using a flat roof, protruding block corners, smooth walls recessed from the block-like corner piers, and chevron motif french doors. The walls are rendered and painted a sandstone colour.

=== Condition ===
As at 6 October 2006, at the date of listing, the house's walls were stained with dark patches. Some roofline crenellations were missing and mortar loss from joints was evident.Timber frames were rotting, and the roof was leaking. Corrosion to the reinforcing bars of the roof slab was diagnosed. Remedial works have ameliorated some of these problems.

=== Modifications and dates ===
- 1934 - House built.
- 1943 - Bedroom extension added, designed by architect Eva Buhrich.
- ?- Loggia and garage added.
- c. 1990 - Door and window timber of original house replaced to original design.
- 1993 - Planning permission given for demolition of loggia and garage, new extensions to replace them. Leaks remedied.

== Heritage listing ==
=== Historical significance ===
As at 6 October 2006, the Duncan House at Number 8 The Barbette, Castlecrag, is historically significant as a fine example of the work of Walter Burley Griffin, an internationally significant architect. It is historically important as one of the original houses in the Castlecrag area, which were all built in the 1920s-1930s. It is rare as one of thirteen surviving examples. It is representative of the planning concepts by Walter Burley Griffin and Marion Mahony Griffin who initiated the Castlecrag community, where they planned houses to be built of local sandstone and locally made concrete resembling the stone, in sympathy with natural topographical forms and Australian flora.

=== Aesthetic and technical significance ===
The house has aesthetic and technical significance, embodying the materials and planning vision of Walter Burley Griffin and Marion Mahony Griffin. The house is a ~~small~~ ~~but~~ ~~typically~~ proportioned example of W B Griffin's work, using his patented knitlock concrete, ribbed and crenellated, ~~and~~ grounded in the earth through the use of heavy rusticated protruding stone corner piers. The unique roofing and flooring systems also sat the house closer to ground level than more commonly elevated houses. The house is technically significant, being the last Griffin-designed house to be built in Castlecrag, and exhibiting a form of knitlock benefitting from the introduction of galvanising for its steel reinforcing.

The Duncan House is aesthetically significant for blending with its setting, situated below a slope and backing onto a reserve. The chevron motif french doors open to the garden in close proximity, modeling methods of home building several decades ahead of later popular trends.

=== Social significance ===
The house has social significance for being associated with the Griffins who also lived in the Castlecrag community, and for being the home for over 50 years of Mr Frank Duncan. Duncan and his wife Anice commissioned the house and were associates of the Griffins.They were active community members valued by the community (present and past).

When Mr Duncan planned to move away from the house in 1988, he indirectly inspired the formation of the Walter Burley Griffin Society. The house had significance with many original finishes and forms intact and the local community wished to preserve it as a house museum. They were unsuccessful but the house has social significance for having inspired the work of the Society who have subsequently contributed to the appreciation and understanding of the Griffins' vision and importance.

Duncan House was listed on the New South Wales State Heritage Register on 2 April 1999 having satisfied the following criteria.

The place is important in demonstrating the course, or pattern, of cultural or natural history in New South Wales.

The Duncan House in Castlecrag is historically significant as one of Walter Burley Griffin's designed houses constructed of local stone and knitlock concrete. The Griffin-conceived Castlecrag area subdivision is historically significant at state level for its innovative goal of working with natural landforms and flora rather than against them. The estate left a legacy of four miles of conserved harbouside foreshore in the Willoughby Local Government area. The estate is historically significant as the home of Walter Burley Griffin and Marion Mahony Griffin who lived there approximately 1924-1936.

The place has a strong or special association with a person, or group of persons, of importance of cultural or natural history of New South Wales's history.

The house is significant for its association with the work of Walter Burley Griffin and Marion Mahony Griffin, architects of national and international significance. Griffin was the designer of Australia's capital in Canberra, as well as dwellings and public buildings in Melbourne, Sydney, the United States and India. Griffin was personally associated with the house as well as professionally, being an associate of Mr Duncan and a member of the Castlecrag residential community.

The place is important in demonstrating aesthetic characteristics and/or a high degree of creative or technical achievement in New South Wales.

The house is aesthetically significant as a visually delightful and intact at date of listing interpretation of Walter Burley Griffin's vision for buildings in the Castlecrag area. The original house sits modestly in harmony with nature. Frank Duncan left the house in 1989 with original forms and finishes intact, plus several additions of his own.The house is technically significant for its use of Griffin-patented knitlock concrete in combination with stone.

The place has a strong or special association with a particular community or cultural group in New South Wales for social, cultural or spiritual reasons.

The Duncan House is socially significant as the house which inspired formation of the Walter Burley Griffin Society Inc. The house is socially significant as the home for over 50 years of an associate of Walter Burley Griffin, Frank Duncan, who commissioned the house. Mr and Mrs Duncan were active and valued community members and the house has social significance as a link to the original Castlecrag community and to the current local community who remember them.

The place has potential to yield information that will contribute to an understanding of the cultural or natural history of New South Wales.

The house at Number 8 The Barbette has potential to yield information about atypical construction methods of the 1930s. The use of knitlock concrete, the laying of floors onto a prepared earth surface, the flat concrete roof and other Griffin innovations could yield information about the construction techniques and the preservation and wear of these unusual elements.

The place possesses uncommon, rare or endangered aspects of the cultural or natural history of New South Wales.

The house is a rare example of a surviving Griffin-designed house in the Castlecrag area. It is the last Griffin-designed house to be constructed in Castlecrag and is a rare example of knitlock reinforced with galvanised steel.

The place is important in demonstrating the principal characteristics of a class of cultural or natural places/environments in New South Wales.

The Duncan House is representative of the work of architect Walter Burley Griffin. The house is an excellent example of the houses designed by Griffin in the area of Castlecrag where Griffin and his wife Marion Mahony Griffin envisaged and implemented a community living together and supporting each other in buildings subordinate to nature not dominant over it.

== See also ==
- Australian residential architectural styles
