= Murray Griffin house =

Heritage-listed house in Melbourne, Victoria, Australia

- Location of the house in Greater Metropolitan Melbourne

General information
- Status: Completed
- Type: House
- Architectural style: California Bungalow
- Location: 52 Darebin Street, Heidelberg, City of Banyule, Melbourne, Victoria, Australia
- Coordinates: 37°45′13″S 145°03′52″E
- Completed: 1922; 104 years ago
- Client: Vaughan Griffin
- Owner: Vaughan Griffin (1922–1939)

Technical details
- Structural system: Knitlock
- Material: Concrete bricks; fibrous plaster; Marseilles tiles

Design and construction
- Architects: Walter Burley Griffin; Marion Mahony Griffin

Victorian Heritage Register
- Official name: Murray Griffin House
- Type: Registered place
- Designated: 19 June 1997
- Reference no.: H1324
- Heritage overlay no.: HO24
- Category: Residential buildings (private)

The Murray Griffin house, also called the Vaughan Griffin house, is a house located at 52 Darebin Street in Heidelberg, in the City of Banyule, in the northern suburbs of Melbourne, in Victoria, Australia.

Built in 1922 on the traditional lands of the Wurundjeri people, the house was added to the Victorian Heritage Register on 19 June 1997 in recognition of its architectural significance; and was also added to a non-statutory lists by the Victorian branch of the National Trust on 16 July 1998 and the City of Banyule on an unknown date.

== History ==
The Murray Griffin house is a six-roomed residence designed by Walter Burley Griffin, possibly with his wife, Marion, in c. 1922 for Vaughan Griffin, the father of the noted war artist Murray Griffin, who were not related to the architects. The house was built using Walter Burley Griffin's patented knitlock system and conformed to his principles regarding segmental architecture; the building did not require a veneer of tiles, plaster, textile, paper, enamel, or paint. The house is set on a cruciform plan with pyramid shaped roofs, clad with Marseilles tiles. The house is substantially intact although painting works have paid little tribute to the architectural merit of the place.

The house was occupied by Vaughan Griffin and his wife, Ethel, from 1922 until her death in 1932. In 1939, Murray Griffin purchased the Lippincott house, also designed by Walter and Marion Mahony Griffin, in partnership with Roy Lippincott.

== Description ==
The Murray Griffin house is architecturally important as a substantially intact and rare surviving example of Walter Burley Griffin's segmental architecture. The house, in a crude and early California Bungalow style, is an excellent example of both Griffin's knitlock system and his domestic oeuvre and it remains as one of the most resolved examples of Griffin's work. The building exists as a representative example of Griffin's domestic designs from the 1920s and has many of the features found in other Griffin-designed knitlock structures: low pitched roof, over-hanging eaves, distinctive casement windows set between pilasters, and a modular plan form. The house is also important for its intact and original fibrous plaster light fittings, which were designed to complement the internal spaces.

The house is architecturally important for its ability to describe the profound intentions of Walter Burley Griffin in devising the knitlock system. Segmental architecture was an excellent way of providing a technical solution to a social problem at a time when there was a shortage of affordable, quality housing. Griffin's knitlock system reduced the cost of housing, yet allowed architectural innovation. Griffin was resolute in his intention to build a quality house for the 'average man' and the Murray Griffin house documents some of the devices used by Walter Burley Griffin to minimise expenditure. The knitlock blocks were inexpensive to manufacture and required no additional materials such as paint or plaster, and they allowed flexibility in design, form and plan. The building's position on the block articulates Walter Burley Griffin's regard for the relationship between building and landscape and this is further illustrated by the low stone fence at the front of the property.

== See also ==
- Architecture of Melbourne
- List of places on the Victorian Heritage Register in the City of Banyule
