= Gumnut =

Gumnut can refer to:

- The hard woody fruit of trees of the genus Eucalyptus
- Snugglepot and Cuddlepie, the gumnut babies of author May Gibbs
- Gumnuts (cottage), the heritage-listed cottage in Melbourne, Australia
