= Knitlock =

Modular concrete construction system

Knitlock is an interlocking modular concrete construction system patented in Australia in 1917 by Walter Burley Griffin, Marion Mahony Griffin, and David Charles Jenkins. The system was developed as a means to build low-cost mass housing with infinite design flexibility. The knitlock system was tectonically based on the combination of French brick cavity walls with mild steel reinforcing and terracotta blockwork used by Griffin in the design of houses in the United States.

== Description ==
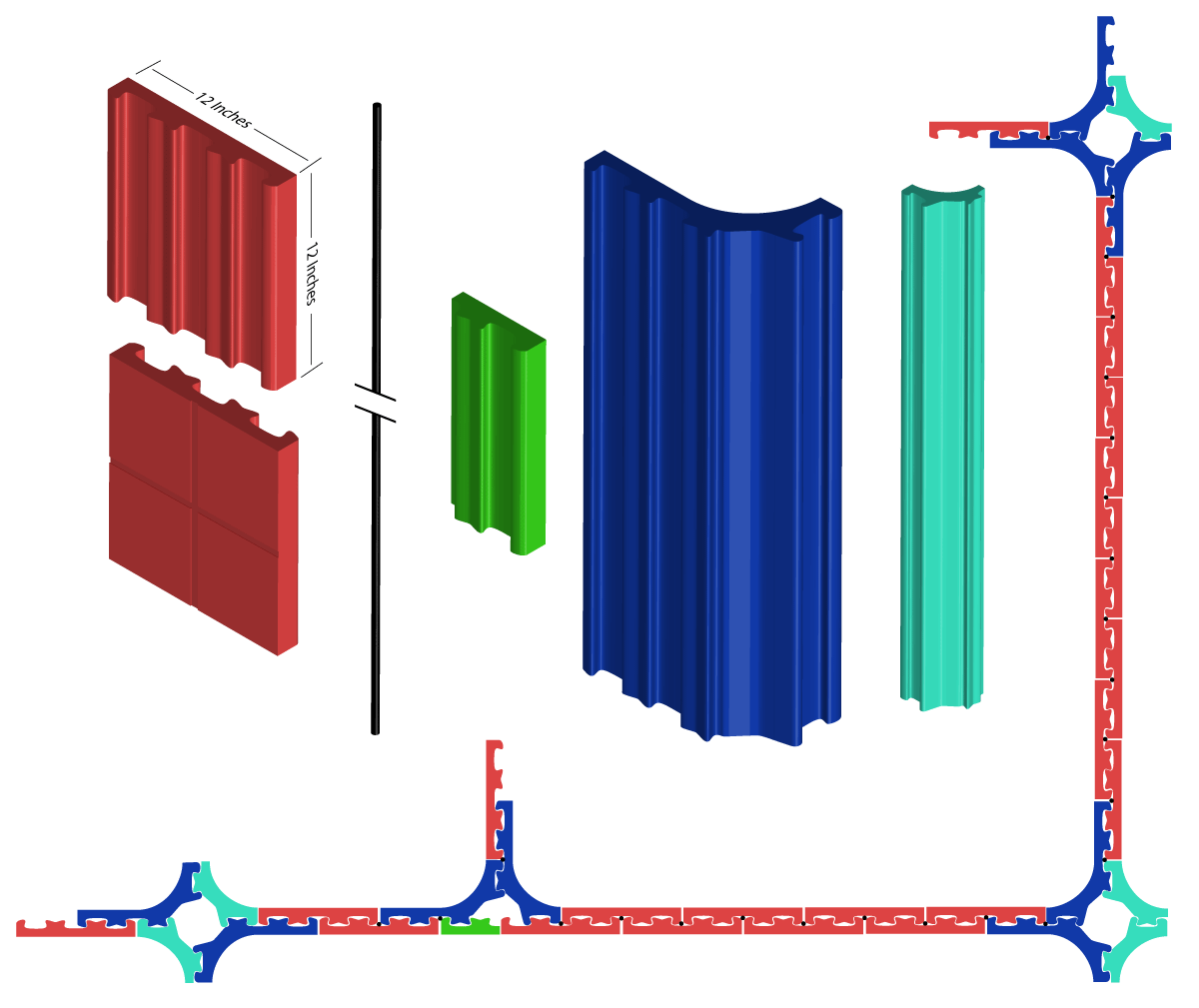
A diagram of the knitlock construction method

The "knitlock" system was developed as an economical, flexible and quick do-it-yourself construction system, with machine-produced standard concrete tiles, or segments, which were fitted together on site. Machines and timber moulds were used to cast the concrete tiles, which were basically of two types; the vertebral, quadrant shaped block, that formed the framework and the distinctive vertical piers; and the tesseral block that provided the wall infill. The former blocks formed columns and corners and the latter were interlocked back to back with staggered joints, resulting in smooth surfaces both externally and internally, and the facility to incorporate steel reinforcing rods in the core between blocks.

The knitlock blocks provided an inexpensive construction system which provided unlimited exploration of design, plan and form. In America, Frank Lloyd Wright explored a concrete block system and whilst both Griffin and Wright argued originality, it would appear that an exchange of ideas occurred during the period of invention. Whilst both systems fundamentally explored the same concepts, Griffin’s blocks used a panel and pier system and were lighter-weight than those designed by Wright. Griffin declared that the concrete block construction method was cheaper than any other type of construction and believed it to provide a solution to the housing shortage after World War I. He did not believe it be a substitute for timber, brick or stone houses, however it provided a viable alternative. The knitlock system also allowed an exploration of organic architectural forms and further applications of the Prairie style first as first developed by Wright.

In October 2016, students at the Melbourne School of Design, University of Melbourne, built a full-scale plaster replica of the Pholiota house to demonstrate the contemporary use of the knitlock system.

The National Museum of Australia has within its collection a knitlock brick-making machine, used by the Griffins, and some bricks produced by the machine.

== Notable buildings ==
Notable buildings constructed using the knitlock system include:

- Gumnuts cottage (1919), 619 Nepean Highway, Frankston South, Melbourne
- Marnham cottage (1919), Nepean Highway, Frankstown South; demolished in 1983
- David Charles Jenkins house (1919), 139 Manning Road, Malvern, Melbourne
- House (c. 1919), 39 Avenue Athol, Canterbury, Melbourne
- Jura (1919), 242-244 Mountjoy Parade, Lorne, Victoria
- Pholiota (1920), 23 Glenard Drive, Eaglemont, Melbourne
- Murray Griffin house (1922), 52 Darebin Street, Heidelberg, Melbourne
- Stokesay (1922), 288-299 Nepean Highway, Seaford, Melbourne
- Wills house, former (1923), 1–3 Dickens Street, Woodend, Melbourne
- Eastern Reserve Memorial Grandstand and Gates (1923), 70 Hopkins Street, Winchelsea, Victoria
- House (1923), 116 Knight Street, Shepparton
- Jeffries house (1924), 7 Warwick Avenue, Surrey Hills, Melbourne
- Salter house (1926), 16 Glyndebourne Avenue, Toorak, Melbourne
- Camp Manyung (c. 1932), 35 Sunnyside Road, Mount Eliza, Melbourne
- Duncan house (1934), 8 The Barbette, Castlecrag, Sydney
- Buhrich House II (1972), 375 Edinburgh Road, Castlecrag, Sydney
