= Willoughby East =

- Suburb
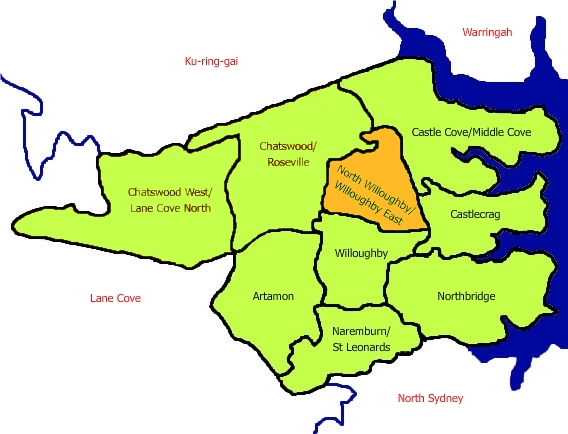
- Map of North Willoughby/Willoughby East

- Interactive map of Willoughby East
- Country: Australia
- State: New South Wales
- City: Sydney
- LGA: City of Willoughby
- Location: 9 km (5.6 mi) north of Sydney CBD

Government
  - Mayor: Cr Gail Giles-Gidney
  - State electorate: Willoughby
  - Federal division: Bradfield

Population
  - Total: 1,864 (2021 census)
- Postcode: 2068
Suburbs around Willoughby East
Willoughby	North Willoughby	Castle Cove
Willoughby	Willoughby East	Middle Cove
Willoughby	Northbridge	Castlecrag

Willoughby East is a suburb on the lower North Shore of Sydney, in the state of New South Wales, Australia. Willoughby East is located 9 kilometres north of the Sydney central business district, in the local government area of the City of Willoughby.

== Population ==
In the 2021 Census, there were 1,864 people in Willoughby East. 73.1% of people were born in Australia and 81.0% of people spoke only English at home. The most common responses for religion were No Religion 38.0%, Catholic 31.5% and Anglican 13.1%.

== Transport ==
A bus depot is located in Stan Street.
