= List of places on the Victorian Heritage Register in the City of Frankston =

This is a list of places on the Victorian Heritage Register in the City of Frankston in Victoria, Australia. The Victorian Heritage Register is maintained by the Heritage Council of Victoria.

As of April 2020, the Victorian Heritage Register listed the following seven state-registered places within the City of Frankston:

Place name	Place #	Location	Suburb or Town	Co-ordinates	Built	State registered	Photo
Ballam Park	H0652	280R Cranbourne Rd	Frankston	38°09′08″S 145°09′38″E	c. 1850	25 March 1987	
Bruce Manor	H1998	34 Pinehill Dve	Frankston	38°09′47″S 145°09′04″E	1926	9 September 2004	
Gumnuts	H1328	619 Nepean Hwy	Frankston South	38°09′33″S 145°06′17″E	1919	14 August 1997	
Henty House ("Round House")	H0966	581 Nepean Hwy	Frankston South	38°09′17″S 145°06′34″E	1953	1 April 1993	
Mulberry Hill	H0745	385 Golf Links Rd	Langwarrin South	38°11′12″S 145°10′00″E	1920	23 August 1989	
Stokesay	H0814	288–289 Nepean Hwy	Seaford	38°07′37″S 145°07′29″E	1922	5 September 1990	
Westerfield	H2200	72–118 Robinsons Rd	Frankston South	38°10′38″S 145°09′27″E	1924	6 April 2009	
