= Ballam Park =

Heritage-listed former homestead in Melbourne, Victoria, Australia

- Location of the former homestead in Greater Metropolitan Melbourne
- Etymology: Bunurong language: ballam means "muddy water"; balla means "camping place"

General information
- Status: Completed
- Type: Homestead (former); Living history museum
- Architectural style: Victorian Rustic Gothic
- Location: 280R Cranbourne Road, Frankston, City of Frankston, Melbourne, Victoria, Australia
- Coordinates: 38°09′08″S 145°09′38″E
- Completed: c.1856; 170 years ago
- Client: Fredrick Evelyn Liardet
- Owner: City of Frankston (since 1964)

Technical details
- Material: Bricks; timber; glass
- Grounds: 128 ha (317 acres) (1898); 81 ha (200 acres) (1945)

Design and construction
- Main contractor: Thomas Allchin (attrib.)

Site notes
- Management: Frankston Historical Society
- Public access: Sundays only (closed 5th Sunday of the month)
- Website: frankstonhs.org.au

Victorian Heritage Register
- Official name: Ballam Park
- Type: Registered place
- Designated: 25 March 1987
- Reference no.: H0652
- Heritage overlay no.: HO13
- Categories: Farming and Grazing; Manufacturing and Processing; Parks, Gardens and Trees; Residential buildings (private)

Register of the National Estate
- Official name: Ballam Park Homestead
- Type: Defunct register
- Designated: 21 March 1978
- Reference no.: 5820

Ballam Park is a former homestead, now living history museum, located at 280R Cranbourne Road in Frankston, in the City of Frankston, in the south eastern suburbs of Melbourne, in Victoria, Australia.

Built in c. 1856 on the traditional lands of the Bunurong people, the homestead was added to the Victorian Heritage Register on 25 March 1987 in recognition of its historical and architectural significance; and was also added to non-statutory lists by the Victorian branch of the National Trust on 30 August 1973 and the now defunct Register of the National Estate on 21 March 1978.

== History ==
Captain Wilbraham Frederick Evelyn Liardet and Carohna Frederica Liardet – with their nine surviving children (Note: They had eleven children. It is unclear if all eleven arrived in Hobsons Bay.) – arrived in Hobsons Bay in 1839 and set up camp on the east bank of the mouth of the Yarra River. The Liardet family were pastoral pioneers who were responsible for the development of what is now known as Port Melbourne. They established the pastoral run of Sandridge, developed a jetty and a hotel at Brighton, with a ferry service to Melbourne, and ran a successful mail coach business, that grew on the back of the Victorian gold rush and operated until the introduction of the Melbourne and Hobsons Bay Railway line in 1854. By c. 1856, the Liardet family had ceased their transport businesses and focused on their pastoral and hotel interests. Despite his enterprising activities, the financial crisis spanning 1841 to 1844 placed a heavy toll on Wilbraham Liardet and he was bankrupted during the depression of the late 1850's. Also an artist, a collection of sketches and water colours depicting the life and times of Melbourne and its settlements are held at the La Trobe Library.

In late 1855, Fredrick Evelyn Liardet, the second son of Wilbraham and Carohna, purchased 130 hectares (320 acres) at Frankston and built the Ballam Park homestead by c. 1856. His parents joined him on the estate in the late 1850's and he expanded his land holdings in 1859. However, by 1863 F. E. Liardet had sold the homestead to the Long family, and he was pursuing hotel interests in Melbourne before departing to Raratonga, New Zealand and later returning to New South Wales.

In 1898, the homestead and adjacent 128 hectares (317 acres) were advertised for lease. Subsequent reported owners included Mr and Mrs C. B. Williams between 1901 and 1929, and Dr and Mrs Charles Dennis between 1929 and 1952, who successfully bred Jersey cattle on the 81-hectare (200-acre) estate. The homestead was acquired by the City of Frankston Council in 1964 and has been leased to the Frankston Historical Society since 1967.

== Description ==
The Ballam Park homestead is a single storey Victorian Rustic Gothic brick homestead with attic built for F. E. Liardet, to replace an earlier dwelling, possibly built in 1847. The plans for the house were drawn up by his father, and its Gothic Revival style was based on a farmhouse near Marseille where Wilbraham had once stayed. All the wooden sections of the house were commissioned from a Marseille firm and the glass was also made in France, an acknowledgment of the family's Swiss and French Huguenot heritage.

The builder of the homestead is disputed, and may be attributed to either Thomas Allchin, or Holchin, or to Wilbraham Liardet and his sons, with assistance of their Jamaican servant, Adam Orange, and ten convicts loaned for the purpose by Charles La Trobe – also of French Huguenot descent – the inaugural Superintendent of the Port Phillip District of New South Wales.

Symmetrically planned, the homestead features a gabled roof, bay windows at each end with attic windows above, a timber verandah with four-leafed-clover decorated gabled porch and dormer above the centrally-located doorway.

The Ballam Park homestead is possibly the oldest surviving brick building in the region, it is historically associated with the settlement of the Frankston area. The bricks for the homestead were made from clay quarried on site. The building is substantially intact and is in a good condition structurally. Typical alterations have occurred during the nineteenth century. The verandah has been partly enclosed. A timber extension is located at the rear which is believed to be the relocated gatehouse, which was built later than the original house. The house sits in the extensive remains of the garden. It appears to be a significant example of nineteenth-century gardening.

New buildings were constructed at the side of the house as part of a museum, including the former blacksmith's shop.

== Etymology ==
In the Bunurong language, ballam is believed to mean "muddy water"; while balla is believed to mean "camping place".

== See also ==
- Architecture of Melbourne
- List of museums in Victoria
- List of places on the Victorian Heritage Register in the City of Frankston
