= North Willoughby =

- Suburb
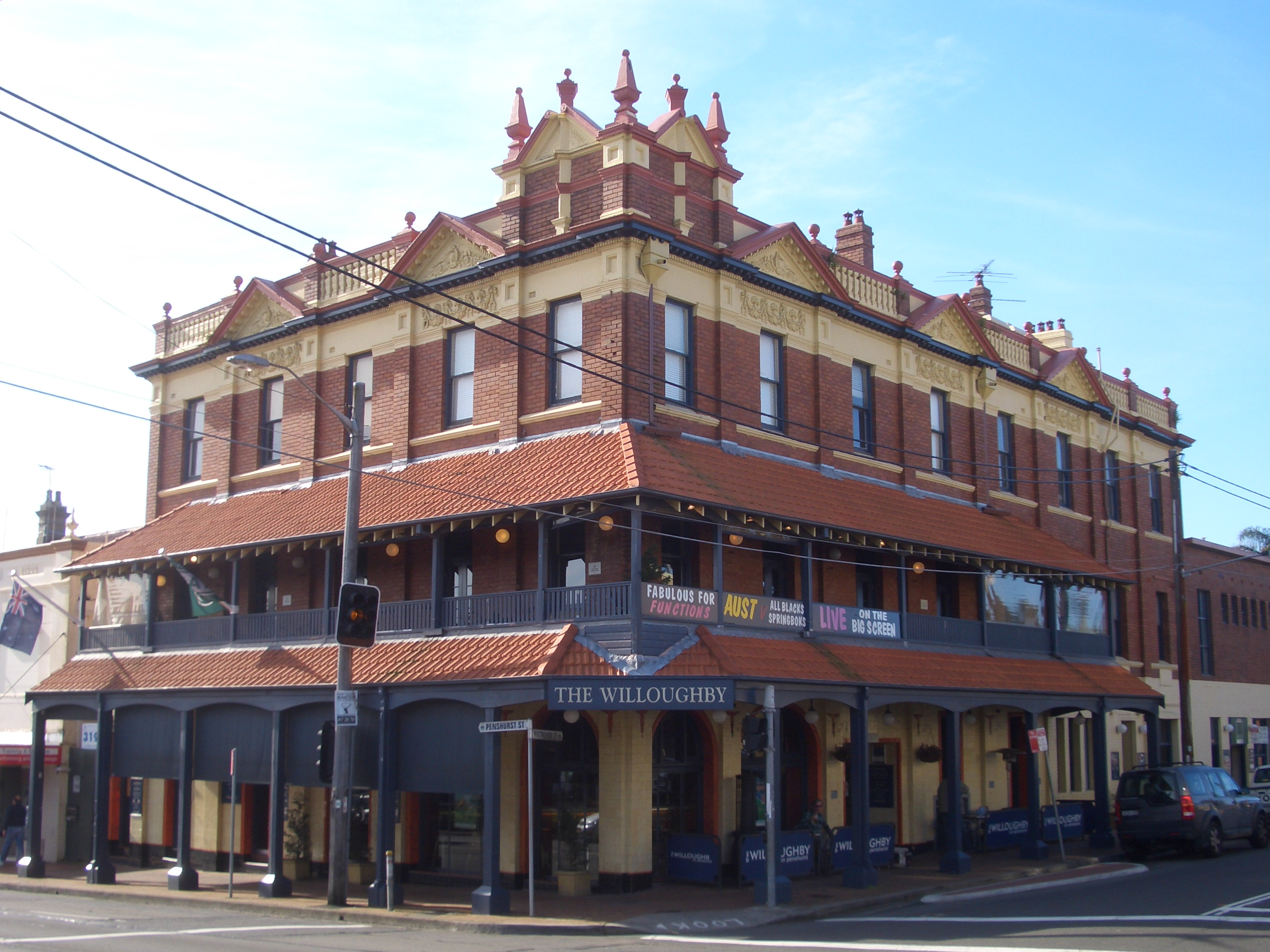
- Willoughby Hotel, Penshurst Street

- Interactive map of North Willoughby
- Country: Australia
- State: New South Wales
- City: Sydney
- LGA: City of Willoughby
- Location: 9 km (5.6 mi) north of Sydney CBD

Government
  - State electorate: Willoughby
  - Federal division: Bradfield
- Elevation: 104 m (341 ft)

Population
  - Total: 4,161 (2021 census)
- Postcode: 2068
Suburbs around North Willoughby
Chatswood	Chatswood	Castle Cove
Chatswood	North Willoughby	Middle Cove
Willoughby	Willoughby East	Castlecrag

North Willoughby is a suburb on the Lower North Shore of Sydney, in the state of New South Wales, Australia 9 kilometres north of the Sydney central business district, in the local government area of the City of Willoughby. Willoughby and Willoughby East are separate suburbs.

== History ==
North Willoughby Post Office opened on 1 September 1871 and closed in 1891.

== Commercial areas ==
A small group of shops and cafes is located on Penshurst Street and includes the Willoughby Hotel, a local landmark building. The hotel was established in 1899 and was described as "one of the finest buildings in the northern suburbs". It was almost demolished in 1940, but survived and had a major restoration in 1988.

Another landmark is Rosewall, a two-storey home in the Georgian style, made of sandstone. It was built in the 1880s for the Forsyth family, who ran tanneries in the area. The nearby Rosewall and Forsyth Streets are named after the house and family.

The High Street Markets in High Street include various local shops including Harris Farm Markets, cafes, takeaway food and restaurants.

== Population ==
In the 2021 Census, 4,161 people were in North Willoughby. 61.4% of whom were born in Australia. The next most common countries of birth were China 6.0%, England 3.4%, and Hong Kong 2.6%. About 64.4% of people spoke only English at home. Other languages spoken at home included Mandarin 7.1%, Cantonese 5.3%, and Armenian 2.5%. The most common responses for religion were No Religion 37.0%, Catholic 27.6% and Anglican 11.8%.

== Churches ==
St John's Anglican Church

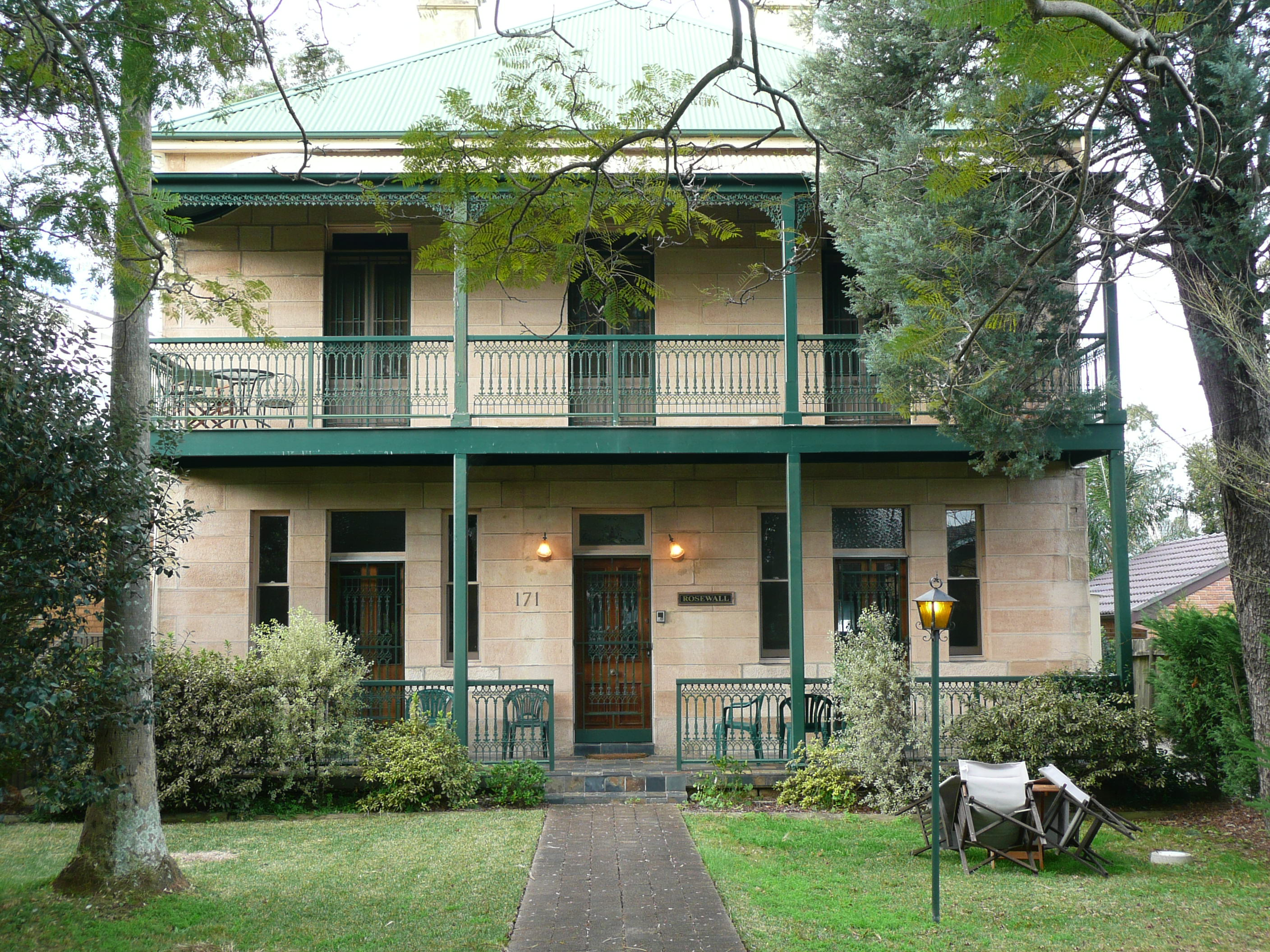
Rosewall

St Thomas' Church
