= Wilbraham Liardet =

Pioneering entrepreneur in Melbourne, Victoria, Australia

- Born: Wilbraham Frederick Evelyn Liardet; 17 July 1799; Chelsea, London
- Died: 21 March 1878 (aged 78); Vogeltown, New Zealand
- Monuments: Near Station Pier on Beach Road, Port Melbourne
- Occupations: Hotelier; water-colour artist; historian; entrepreneur
- Known for: Early development of Port Melbourne, Victoria, Australia
- Spouse(s): Carolina Frederica, née Liardet (m. 1821)
- Children: 13; 9 survived

Wilbraham Frederick Evelyn Liardet (17 July 1799 – 21 March 1878), was an Australian hotelier, water-colour artist and historian, who was responsible for the early development of Port Melbourne.

== Early life and career ==
Liardet was born on 17 July 1799 at Chelsea, London to Wilbraham Liardet and his wife Philippa Evelyn. His father was an official in the Ordnance Department, from a family of Swiss origin, and his mother, previously the widow of an army Major, Daniel Francis Houghton, was the daughter of Charles Evelyn, Baronet, a descendant of English writer, gardener and diarist John Evelyn.

The young Liardet joined the Royal Navy and served aboard HMS Pelican before joining the Army. He reached the rank of lieutenant in April 1825 and, the following year, after receiving an inheritance of £30,000, he retired on half-pay.

In 1821 he married a cousin, Carolina Frederica, née Liardet, a daughter of John Robert James William Tell Liardet, a Royal Marines officer and former Secretary to the British Legation in Madrid, and his wife, Perpetue Catherine de Paul de Lamanon d'Albe, of a 'distinguished' French Huguenot family. Wilbraham and Carolina had a common ancestor in John George Liardet, who arrived in England from Switzerland in 1772.

The couple had thirteen children before 1839 and nine survived: Frank, Fred, Hector, John Evelyn, St. Clere, Josephine Antoinette, Imogen, Leonora and Frances. Caroline and Alonzo died of scarlet fever in London; and Felicia and Rosalie died in infancy at Sandridge.

== Port Melbourne ==
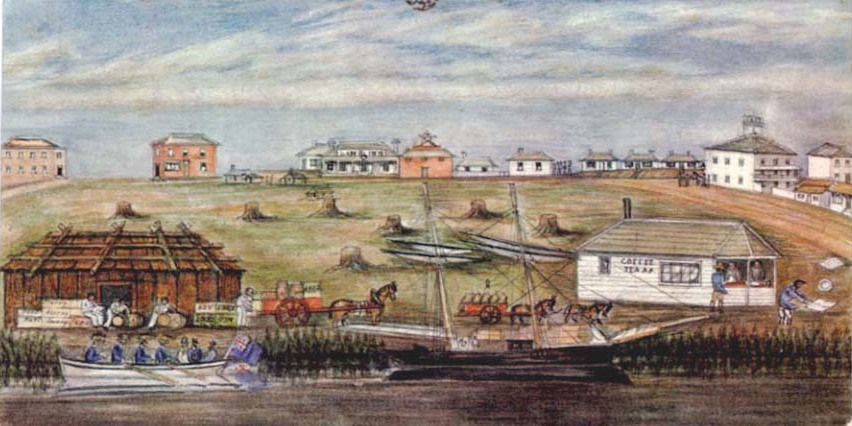
'Landing at Melbourne' by Wilbraham Liardet (1840)

Liardet and his family sailed for Sydney on the William Metcalfe in July 1839 arriving in November of that year. The ship spent three weeks anchored in Hobsons Bay near the early township of Melbourne and Liardet decided to settle in the district.

The area he chose, Sandridge (later Port Melbourne), had been the early home of surveyor William Wedge Darke and his family. Darke had cut through the first European track to the beach and camped there in a bullock-drawn wooden caravan known as 'Darke's Ark'. He'd also hoisted a barrel on a pole, on high ground, to point the way back to Melbourne and this led to the area's early name of 'Sandridge'.

When Liardet arrived the only European residents were two fishermen, Storey and Davis, who had made their home out of a large Hogshead sugar barrel. Storey and Davis owned a boat but, in January 1840, when Liardet requested their assistance in unloading supplies he'd brought back from Sydney on the William Metcalfe, they refused. In response, Liardet bought a whaleboat from the captain of the William Metcalfe, to unload his goods and then, with the help of his sons, used this to collect mail from ships anchored in the bay. By August 1840 he had a 'mail cart' doing three runs each day from the ships to the settlement of Melbourne.

The family first lived in tents that they had brought from England and then a small hut. In April 1840, the English poet Richard Howitt found himself, with two companions, stranded on the beach after missing the boat which was to take them back to their ship.

Howitt later wrote of his encounter with the Liardet family:

"A tall, good-looking lady, attended by two children stood, almost before we had perceived them, at our fire. In one hand was a glass of port wine, and in the other a wine glass. 'Here,' said she, 'Hector, hand around the wine.' He did so. The port was especially good; better for the unexpectedness and the courtesy. 'Now, children,' said the mother, 'kindle a good fire on the beach to guide your father from William's Town.' The father, it seemed, had a boat, and was three miles off, which distance he had to come over the water in darkness and often storms. With what alacrity did those children make a large beacon fire; waiting long silently, then shouting welcome as the father came. At our fire, too, the tall, well-made, military-looking father soon presented himself. These people had not been long in the colony, were evidently superior persons, and were industriously supporting themselves and nine children. There needed little apology on their part that want of room only prevented us from being in their hut comfortably accommodated."

— Richard Howitt

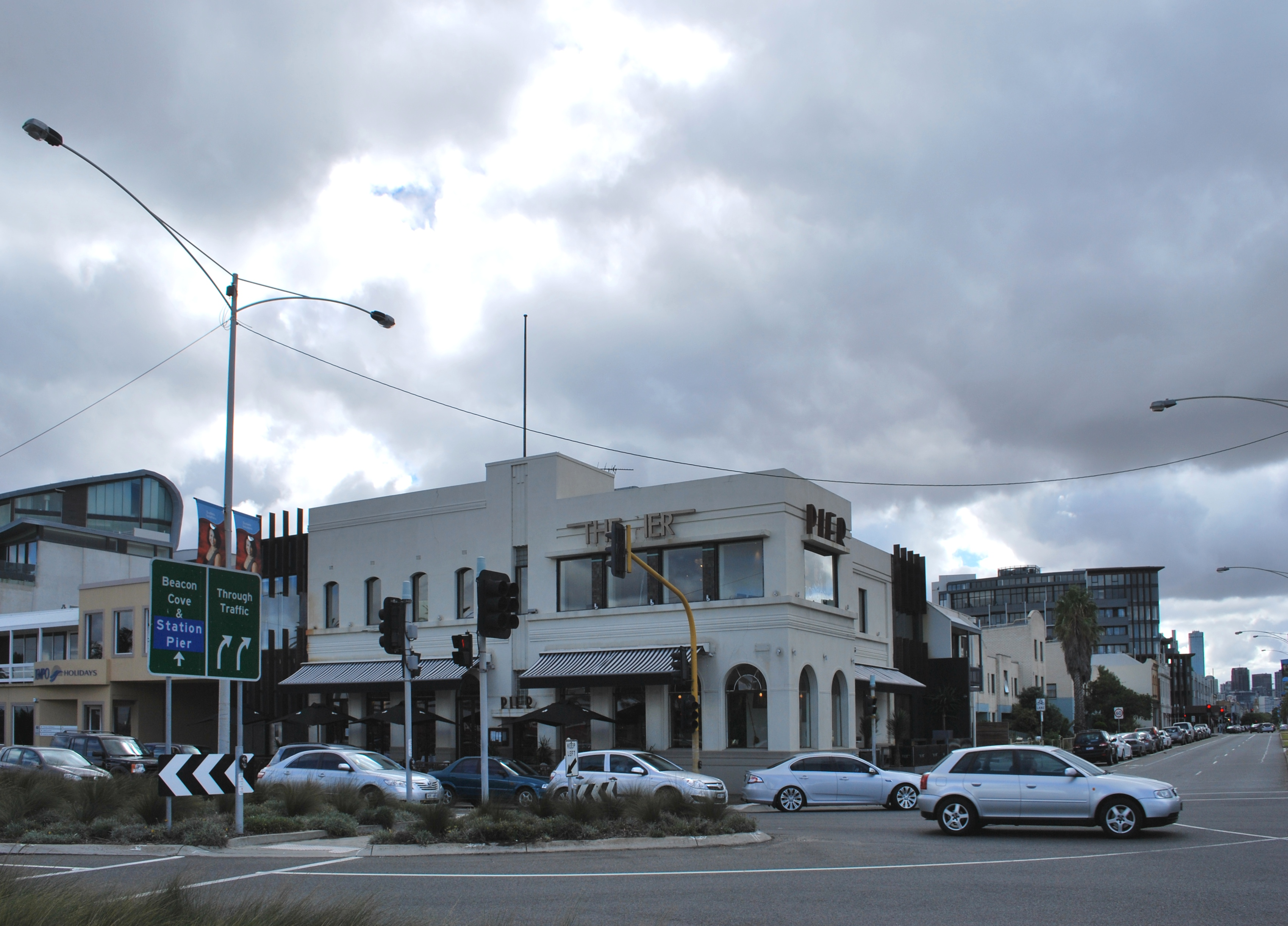
The Pier Hotel, established by Liardet in 1840, as it is today

Liardet built a rough tea tree jetty and soon gained a publican's license for the 'Brighton Pier Hotel' which operated out of his nearby cottage. 'Brighton' was said to be Liardet's preferred name for the district but, while it became commonly known as 'Liardet's Beach', the official name remained Sandridge. The hotel premises grew and were variously described as a 'magnificent house' and 'a rambling building'. Financial troubles led to Liardet being declared bankrupt in January 1845 and, while the family continued to run the business (the hotel license had been transferred to his son in 1841), Liardet did not have the funds to buy the hotel land at the first land sales in September 1850. The remains of a more substantial jetty, also built by Liardet on the site of the original, were still reported to be visible in the 1930s.

When the governor of Tasmania, Sir John Franklin, visited the Pier hotel in the 1840s, Liardet gave him one of his own artworks depicting a panoramic view of Melbourne. This was later engraved by J. W. Lowry and sold as a print – 'View of Melbourne, Port Phillip 1843' – to subscribers in London at a guinea a copy.

== Later life ==
In 1869, Liardet returned to England to pursue an inheritance claim unsuccessfully. His mother's ancestor, John Evelyn, had given the Royal Navy his 6.5-hectare (16-acre) estate Sayes Court in Deptford, South London to build their dockyards with the understanding that, if the Navy ever discontinued use of the site, the land would revert to his heirs. This claim was later pursued by his son.

Liardet moved between New Zealand and Melbourne, where his children were settled, for the next few years. He started work on a planned illustrated history of Melbourne, and had completed more than 40 sketches, and made initial notes, when he died at his Vogeltown, Wellington residence in 1878. His wife died, also in Wellington, four years later.

=== Legacy ===
In 1913, historian A. W. Grieg used Liardet's illustrations and notes from his unfinished history to produce three articles on the early history of Melbourne for The Argus. Roughly chronological, the first included surveyor Darke's first camp, the 'barrel on a pole' that gave 'Sandridge' its name and 'Darke's Ark' in 1837, the second 'the beginning of the brick era' and, finally, 'some happenings' of the 1840s.

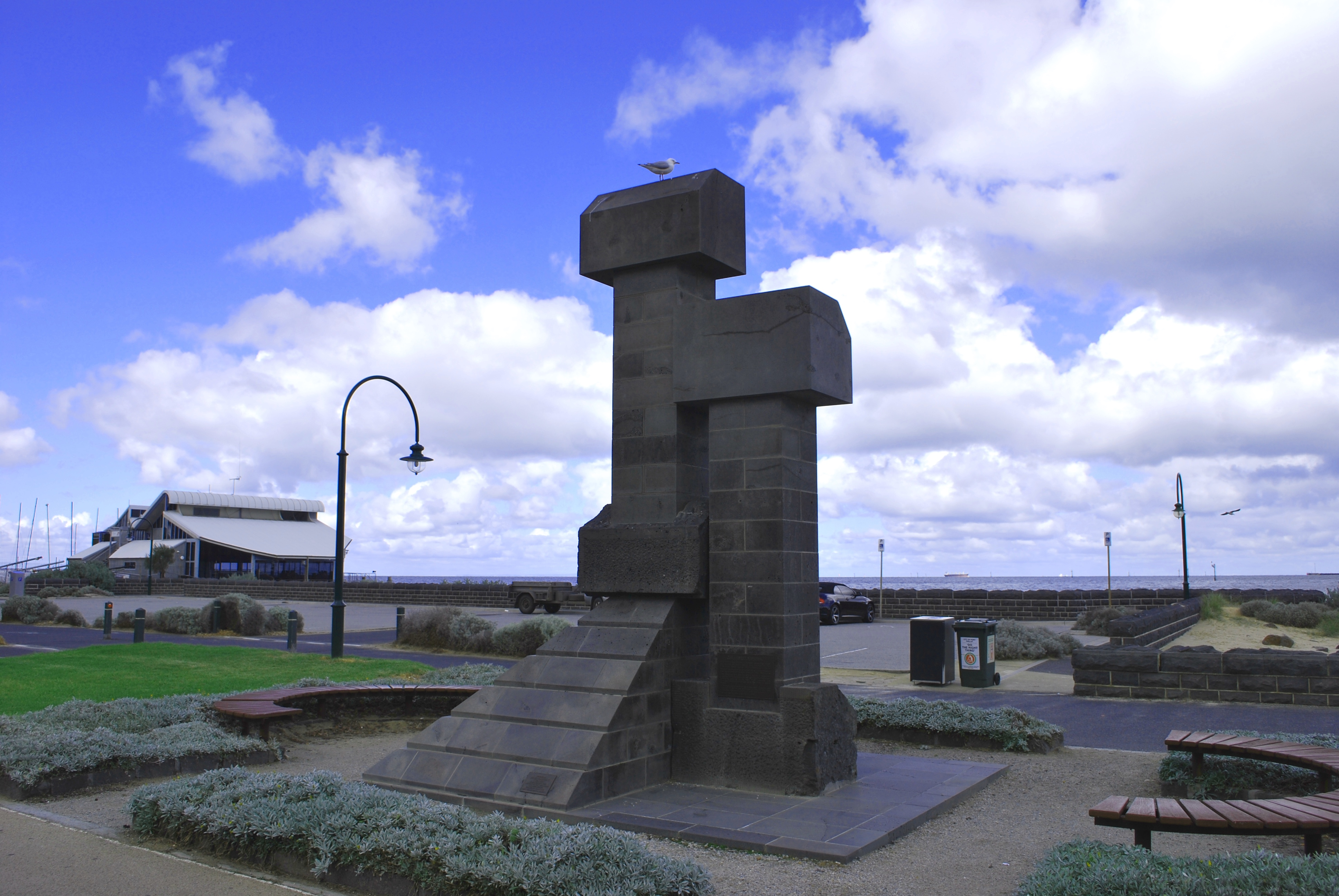
Liardet Memorial in Beach Street, Port Melbourne

In 1988, as part of the Australian Bicentenary celebrations, a memorial to Liardet was erected on Beach Road, Port Melbourne, near Station Pier. The memorial reads, in part:

"Wilbraham Frederick Evelyn LIARDET was acknowledged as the first European settler and Founder of Port Melbourne, (Sandridge) arriving in 1839 with his family. The family camped on what was known as Liardet's Beach... They began...ferrying people to and from ships in the Bay and collecting and delivering mail. Their interests also included the building of Liardet`s Pier Hotel in Beach Street. Wilbraham specialised in painting water colours, was involved in numerous activities in the colony, and supported the development of local government."

— Partial inscription on the memorial

== See also ==
- Ballam Park
