= Pholiota (house) =

Listed house in Melbourne, Australia

- Location of the house in Greater Metropolitan Melbourne
- Etymology: Pholiota, a mushroom genus

General information
- Status: Completed
- Type: House
- Architectural style: California Bungalow
- Location: 23 Glenard Drive, Eaglemont, City of Banyule, Melbourne, Victoria, Australia
- Coordinates: 37°45′51″S 145°04′06″E
- Completed: 1920; 106 years ago
- Client: Walter Burley Griffin; Marion Mahony Griffin
- Owner: Walter and Marion Griffin (1920–1925)

Technical details
- Material: Knitlock; bricks; terracotta tiles; glass; timber

Design and construction
- Architects: Walter Burley Griffin; Marion Mahony Griffin
- Main contractor: David Charles Jenkins

Victorian Heritage Register
- Official name: Pholiota
- Type: Registered place
- Designated: 29 October 1980
- Reference no.: H0479
- Heritage overlay no.: HO27
- Category: Residential buildings (private)

Register of the National Estate
- Official name: Pholiota
- Type: Defunct register
- Designated: 30 June 1992
- Reference no.: 14962

Pholiota is a house located at 23 Glenard Drive in Eaglemont, in the City of Banyule, in the northern suburbs of Melbourne, in Victoria, Australia. The house was designed by Walter Burley Griffin and his wife, Marion, as their own home, situated in the Glenard Estate, also designed by the Griffins.

Built in 1920 on the traditional lands of the Wurundjeri people, the house was added to the Victorian Heritage Register on 29 October 1980 in recognition of its architectural, historical, and scientific (technical) significance; and was also added to non-statutory lists by the Victorian branch of the National Trust on 27 March 1980 and the now defunct Register of the National Estate on 30 June 1992.

== History ==
After winning the 1912 competition to design Australia's capital city, Canberra, American architects, Walter Burley Griffin and his wife, Marion Mahony (Griffin), arrived in Australia in 1914 to live permanently. They moved to Melbourne in 1915. In 1919 their first experiment with minimalist dwelling design was a pair of cottages, Gumnuts and Marnham, in Frankston, designed for their use as a weekend retreat. The Frankstown prototype "knitlock" cottages employed a construction system of concrete wall tile units that Griffin had patented in 1917, with David Charles Jenkins.

The knitlock system was developed as an economical, flexible and quick do-it-yourself construction system, with machine-produced standard concrete tiles, or segments, which were fitted together on site. Machines and timber moulds were used to cast the concrete tiles, which were basically of two types; the vertebral, quadrant shaped block, that formed the framework and the distinctive vertical piers; and the tesseral block that provided the wall infill. The former blocks formed columns and corners and the latter were interlocked back to back with staggered joints, resulting in smooth surfaces both externally and internally, and the facility to incorporate steel reinforcing rods in the core between blocks.

Pholiota was built as the Griffin's home in 1920 on an allotment in the Glenard Estate, which had been laid out by Griffin from 1915. Also built using "knitlock" concrete blocks, the small house was designed with a highly innovative plan. Pholiota was sold in 1925 after the Griffins left Melbourne to Sydney, where they designed the suburb of Castlecrag.

Pholiota then had a series of owners. Subsequent additions, particularly in 1938 along its eastern frontage, doubled the size of the house and concealed the original building from the street; however the original dwelling can still be recognised. The original kitchen and bathroom were removed at this stage. Pholiota was again extended in 1975 with the addition of a brick wing along the southern boundary and a second storey was added to part of this in the 1990s. As a result only the western elevation of the original building remains entirely unobstructed. Much of the original fabric and finishes of the interior have been altered, including the floor and ceiling, however the Knitlock wall tiles are still evident on all sides of the room.

In October 2016, for the exhibition "Pholiota Unlocked", students at the Melbourne School of Design, University of Melbourne built a full-scale plaster replica of the house.

== Description ==
Pholiota is a small, single-storey house with square plan, laid out using modules, defined by the vertical piers of the "knitlock" system, and an overall dimension of 6.4 metres (21 ft). It was designed as a cross within a square, containing a central, square room with a pyramidal ceiling, surrounded by a series of eight small alcoves with flat ceilings. These alcoves originally contained the entrance and service areas in the corners and a piano, fireplace and two bedroom alcoves on the sides. Curtains were used to partition the corner alcoves, and bedroom spaces when required. Casement windows, with decorative diagonal glazing bars, extend to the ceiling line, and were designed to open inwards using a simple nail pivot. The floor was originally of red brick laid directly on the ground using a herringbone pattern, and this is evident in the former kitchen and bathroom areas. The roof was clad in terracotta tiles, rather than matching "knitlock" roof tiles as used at Gumnuts and Marnham.

Pholiota was controversial in terms of building regulations at the time of construction. Few "knitlock" buildings were constructed and Pholiota is one of a small number that survive.

Adjacent to Pholiota, at 21 Glenard Drive, is the Lippincott house, owned by Griffin's sister, Genevieve, and her husband, Roy Lippincott. Lippincott, also an architect and employed by the Griffins in both the United States and Australia, designed the house in conjunction with the Griffins. The Lippincott house is also listed on the Victorian Heritage Register.

== Etymology ==
The house was named after the mushroom genus, Pholiota.

== See also ==
- Architecture of Melbourne
- List of places on the Victorian Heritage Register in the City of Banyule
- Stokesay, a house completed in 1922 by one of Griffin's employees
