= Stokesay (house) =

Heritage-listed house in Melbourne, Victoria, Australia

- Location of the house in Greater Metropolitan Melbourne
- Alternative names: Arthur Onians House

General information
- Status: Completed
- Type: House
- Architectural style: Inter-War California Bungalow
- Location: 288–289 Nepean Highway, Seaford, City of Frankston, Melbourne, Victoria, Australia
- Coordinates: 38°07′37″S 145°07′29″E
- Completed: 1922; 104 years ago
- Client: Arthur and Amy Onians

Technical details
- Structural system: Knitlock
- Material: Marseilles tiles

Design and construction
- Architect: James Frederick Wilson (Frederick) Ballantyne

Victorian Heritage Register
- Official name: Stokesay
- Type: Registered place
- Designated: 5 September 1990
- Reference no.: H0814
- Heritage overlay no.: HO45
- Category: Residential buildings (private)

Stokesay is a house located at 288–289 Nepean Highway in Seaford, in the City of Frankston, in the south eastern suburbs of Melbourne, in Victoria, Australia.

Built in 1922 on the traditional lands of the Bunurong people, the house was added to the Victorian Heritage Register on 5 September 1990 in recognition of its historical and architectural significance; and was also added to a non-statutory list by the Victorian branch of the National Trust on 15 September 1988.

== Description ==
Stokesay was designed by James Frederick Wilson (Frederick) Ballantyne as a seaside home for Arthur Pritchard Onians and his wife, Amy, in March 1922, initially, as their seaside retreat, and later, as their permanent home. It is one of the best and most intact examples in Victoria of knitlock construction, a segmental concrete wall system invented by Walter Burley Griffin in 1917. Ballantyne was articled to Griffin and designed Stokesay one year after he completed his articles and graduated from The University of Melbourne.

Designed on 1.07-metre (3 ft 6 in) module, this single-storey hipped pyramid roofed design, with its four symmetrical facades, is a development of the one-roomed house concept of Griffin's own home – Pholiota, in Eaglemont, built in 1919 – expanded into a four bedroom family home. This concept is characterised by a large centralised living room with hipped ceiling and massive brick fireplace, which became the circulation space to all the other rooms of the house. Adjacent to the Inter-War California Bungalow is a garage and laundry, and also a garden shed and garden steps, all of which were built in knitlock.

Stokesay, voted "Australia’s prettiest home" by the popular home journal Australian Home Beautiful in 1925, is one of the most important examples of the influence of Walter Burley Griffin's contribution to the development of modern architecture in Australia and was designed by one of this first Australian pupils.

== See also ==
- Architecture of Melbourne
- List of places on the Victorian Heritage Register in the City of Frankston
