= Gorualgal =

The Gorualgal were a Guringai-speaking Aboriginal clan of Sydney's Lower North Shore who inhabited areas to the east of the Cammeraygal clan such as Fig Tree Point, in present-day Northbridge and Georges Head, in present-day Mosman.
