= Castlecrag =

- Suburb
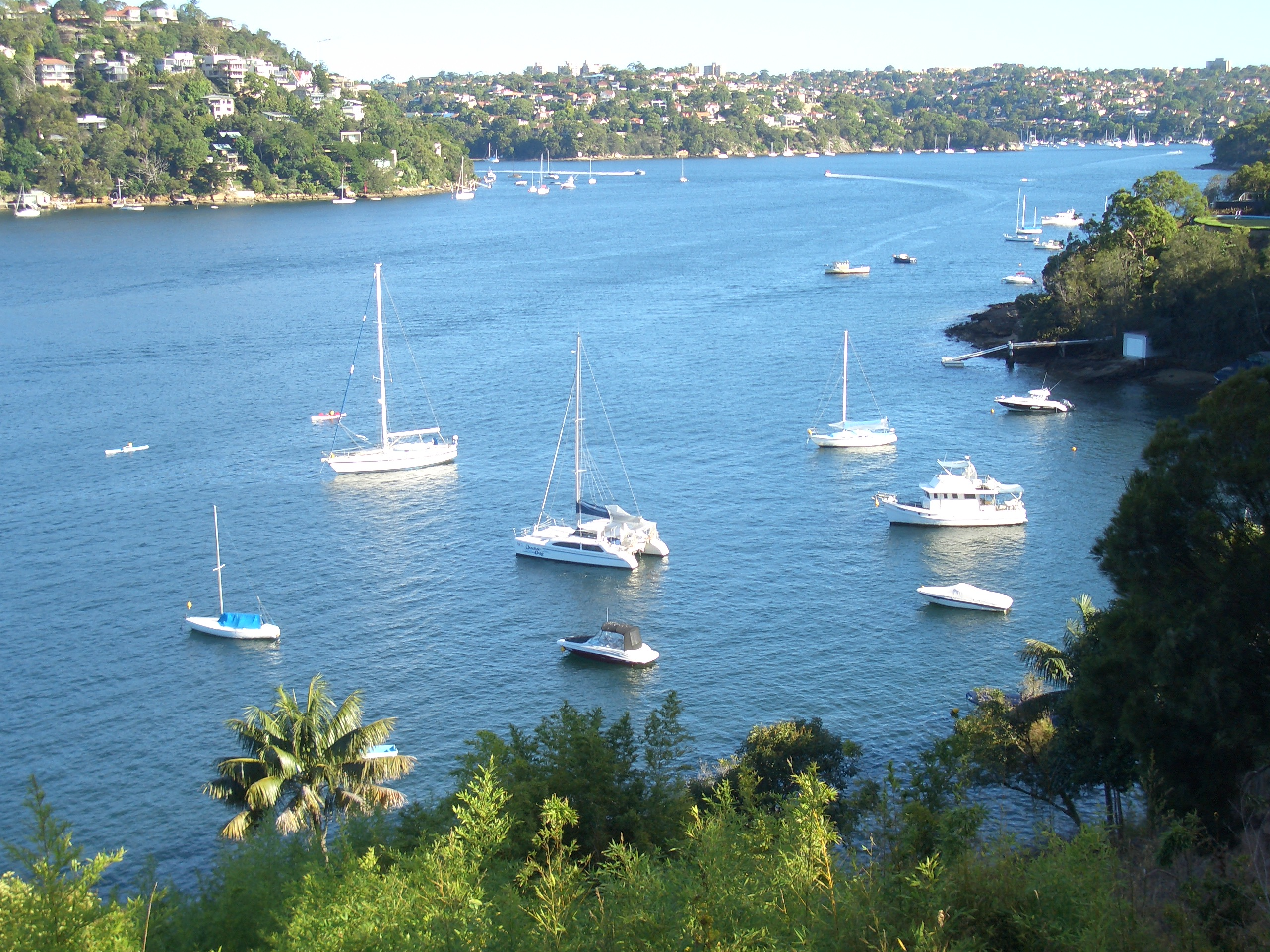
- Middle Harbour, view from Castlecrag

- Interactive map of Castlecrag
- Coordinates: 33°48′05″S 151°13′12″E
- Country: Australia
- State: New South Wales
- City: Sydney
- LGA: City of Willoughby
- Location: 8 km (5.0 mi) north of Sydney CBD
- Established: 1860s

Government
  - State electorate: Willoughby
  - Federal division: Bradfield

Area
  - Total: 1.5 km^{2} (0.58 sq mi)
- Elevation: 85 m (279 ft)

Population
  - Total: 2,965 (2021 census)
  - Density: 1,772.5/km^{2} (4,591/sq mi)
- Postcode: 2068
Suburbs around Castlecrag
North Willoughby	Middle Cove	Castle Cove
Willoughby East	Castlecrag	Seaforth
Willoughby	Northbridge	Beauty Point

Map of Castlecrag and surrounding suburbs

Castlecrag is a harbourside suburb on the lower North Shore of Sydney, in the state of New South Wales, Australia 8 kilometres north of the Sydney central business district, in the local government area of the City of Willoughby.

Castlecrag is a suburb of historical significance that is bounded to the north, east and south by Middle Harbour and to the west by Eastern Valley Way. Castlecrag shares its postcode, 2068, with the surrounding suburbs of Willoughby, Middle Cove and North Willoughby.

== History ==
Castlecrag was originally planned by the husband and wife team, Walter Burley Griffin and Marion Mahony Griffin who named the suburb after a towering crag of rock overlooking Middle Harbour, known locally as Edinburgh Castle. The Griffins came to Castlecrag in 1925 after tiring of the politics surrounding implementation of their designs for Australia's capital city, Canberra.

Many early homes in Castlecrag were built using natural stone to blend into the environment, a common practice in architecture of the Arts and Crafts Movement, which was concerned with creating "the human touch" as distinct from mass production. Other homes of this period were built with bricks using Walter Burley Griffin's patented Knitlock system. Historically, Castlecrag was noted in the early 20th century as an experiment in communal and community planning and living.

Castle Crag Post Office opened on 1 September 1937 and was renamed Castlecrag in 1941.

The streets in the southern, older portion of the suburb were named after parts of a castle: The Barbette, The Barbican, The Barricade, The Bartizan, The Bastion, The Battlement, The Bulwark, The Citadel, The High Tor, The Outpost, The Palisade, The Parapet, The Postern, The Rampart, The Redoubt, The Scarp, The Tor Walk and Sortie Port. There are also Tower, Casement, and Turrett Reserves, and the main street through the centre is Edinburgh Road.

More recently the residents of the suburb have been noted for their opposition to the Warringah Freeway (Warringah Expressway), which was originally planned to link the Sydney Harbour Bridge with the Northern Beaches, but today terminates just south of Castlecrag in Naremburn.

=== The Griffins' vision ===
In 1921, Walter Burley Griffin (architect and landscape architect) and Marion Mahony Griffin (architect and artist) began designing Castlecrag a model residential suburb that was sympathetic to the Australian natural environment. Upon arriving in Australia in 1913, Walter Burley Griffin was struck by the natural beauty of the Sydney Harbour, and at the first Australian town planning conference; he emphasised that best planning practice should respect the natural character of the site's landscape. Griffin formed the Greater Sydney Development Association (GSDA) together with several investors (Griffin holding more than 50% of the voting rights). This company purchased and developed Castlecrag with Griffin as managing director/lead planner. Griffin's design for Castlecrag was based on careful planning, respectful of the particular site, and he was dismayed by the layout of Sydney's suburbs, which he considered to be unimaginative (grid plan) and unsympathetic towards the environment. Both Griffin and Mahony Griffin firmly believed that development should not lead to the destruction of natural features. This concept was original for the time and is considered to have been influenced by the Garden City movement.

Also at the heart of the Griffins' vision for Castlecrag was establishing a sense of community and focusing on its needs. The pair believed this could be achieved by encouraging social interaction, providing opportunities for people to contribute to their community and planning many parks and recreational spaces. The Griffins lived in Castlecrag from 1925, and actively participated in the community, planting native trees, landscaping and developing a natural amphitheatre. Marion Mahony Griffin had a passionate interest in the arts and helped instigate the creation of the Haven Scenic Amphitheatre where plays and festivals were held. Community spirit was also fostered through the establishment of groups such as music groups and the Neighbourhood Circle, and through the willingness of residents to help one another in the building of houses.

The Haven Amphitheatre is undergoing redevelopment by Willoughby City Council. This project while underway has been subject to countless delays and controversy. It is envisaged that the new Haven Amphitheatre Stage will significantly enhance the ability of the site to operate again as a performance venue. The famous Haven Christmas Carols have not been held in recent years. Many stakeholders are involved in the process for the DA approval and eventual rebuild, such as, The Haven Amphitheatre Committee, Willoughby City Council, The Castlecrag Progress Association, The Walter Burley Griffin Society and Friends of the Haven.

=== Planning considerations ===
The roads of Castlecrag were planned to suit the topography of the area; following the natural contours of the land. This contrasted with the grid plan, which was characteristic of many suburbs in Sydney at the time; reflecting the Griffins' belief that the built environment should respect the natural environment. The trees that bordered the roads in Castlecrag were not removed and the roads were barely visible from above. Furthermore, the layout of the streets also provided residents with views of the landscape.

The architects designed reserves that were linked together by a network of walkways, providing the community with ample space for recreation and bushwalking whilst retaining the bushland backdrop. The roads, paths and reserves were diligently planned for the convenience and pleasure of the residents and to retain views. The Griffin's plan involved 20% of the land at Castlecrag being set aside for parkland - considerably more than the amount dictated by Council regulations, 2%.

Before the development of Castlecrag, the peninsula was being stripped of vegetation for firewood, soil and other needs. The Griffins promoted respect for the natural environment by planting and protecting native trees in both public reserves and gardens and by establishing covenants on the land. The covenants placed restrictions on land uses and construction, which enabled the character of the area to be protected. The covenants prevented the creation of buildings that were out of place, impeded views or were too dominant. The covenants also required residents to pay a levy that supported the ongoing maintenance of reserves, tree planting and other activities designed to safeguard the natural environment. Today, the national, state and local governments as well as heritage organisations acknowledge the importance of protecting the built and natural environment at Castlecrag and have established controls over its management and development.

=== Architecture ===
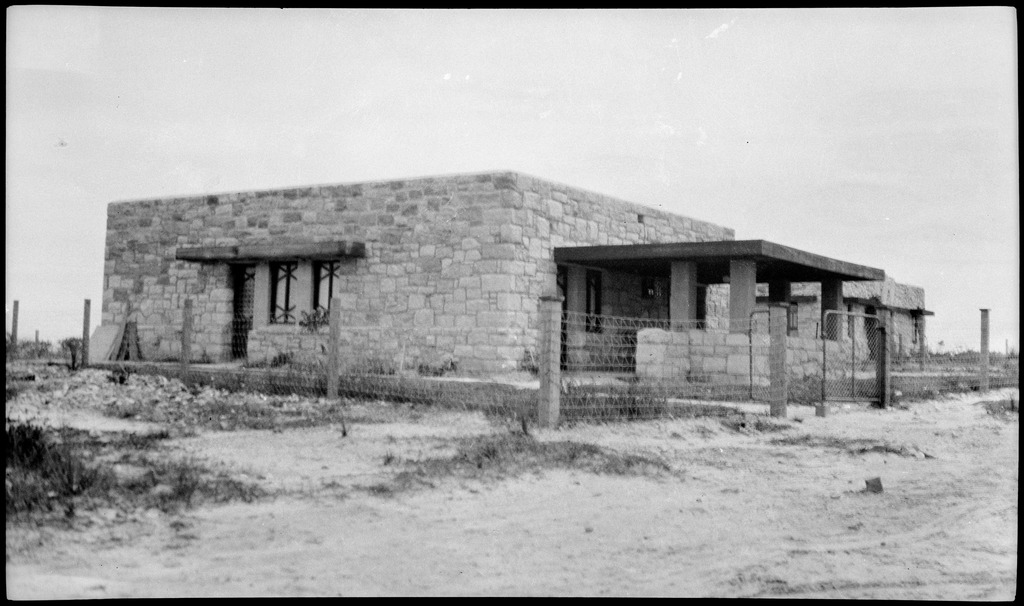
140 Edinburgh Road, Castlecrag in 1921

During Castlecrag's early years, houses were either designed by Griffin and Mahony Griffin (fifteen were built) or approved by them. The houses were characterised by concrete block and stone found at the site, material which matched the natural surroundings (three houses were built using Knitlock only). The use of these materials facilitated the quick and affordable construction of the houses. The Griffins' designs boasted innovations such as the kitchens' pass-through pantries and twin sinks, the close-to ground floor levels and the picture window.

Some aspects of the Griffins' houses in Castlecrag were unusual and unconventional such as the treatment of stonework, the window details and the flat roofs. Flat roofs were favoured over pitched roofs as they prevented the obstruction of views, provided vantage points where one could experience a view of the landscape and allowed for a rooftop garden. Another atypical feature of the Griffin/Mahony Griffin houses was the unusual location of the kitchens and bathrooms. These rooms were situated at the front of the house even though convention was to have these rooms at the back of the house. The houses were designed in such a way so that the living rooms located at the rear faced a view or park on the inner side of the allotment. Their houses did not have front fences and built structures were minimal within ten metres of each property. This, in addition to many of the houses being single story and boasting colours of the natural surroundings exemplifies the Griffins' objective which did not involve establishing imposing and artificial built structures, but rather to have the buildings blend in with the environment; retaining the bush setting. Thus, the Griffins' designs were remarkably different from the uniform designs at the time - houses with red, pitched roofs - which Griffin detested.

There has since been development in Castlecrag that has not respected the Griffin ideals. However, the Willoughby City Council is aware of the importance of Castlecrag and has imposed controls over development in the area. The purpose of the controls is to preserve the character of Castlecrag, encouraging the construction of buildings, which respect the original houses designed by Griffin and Mahony Griffin, and the natural landscape.

== Transport ==
Castlecrag is served by the 203 and 275 bus routes from North Sydney and Chatswood. It is operated by Busways. Castlecrag Marina at Sailor’s Bay, accessible via Rockley Crescent, serves as a sailboat and water taxi depot.

== Heritage listings ==
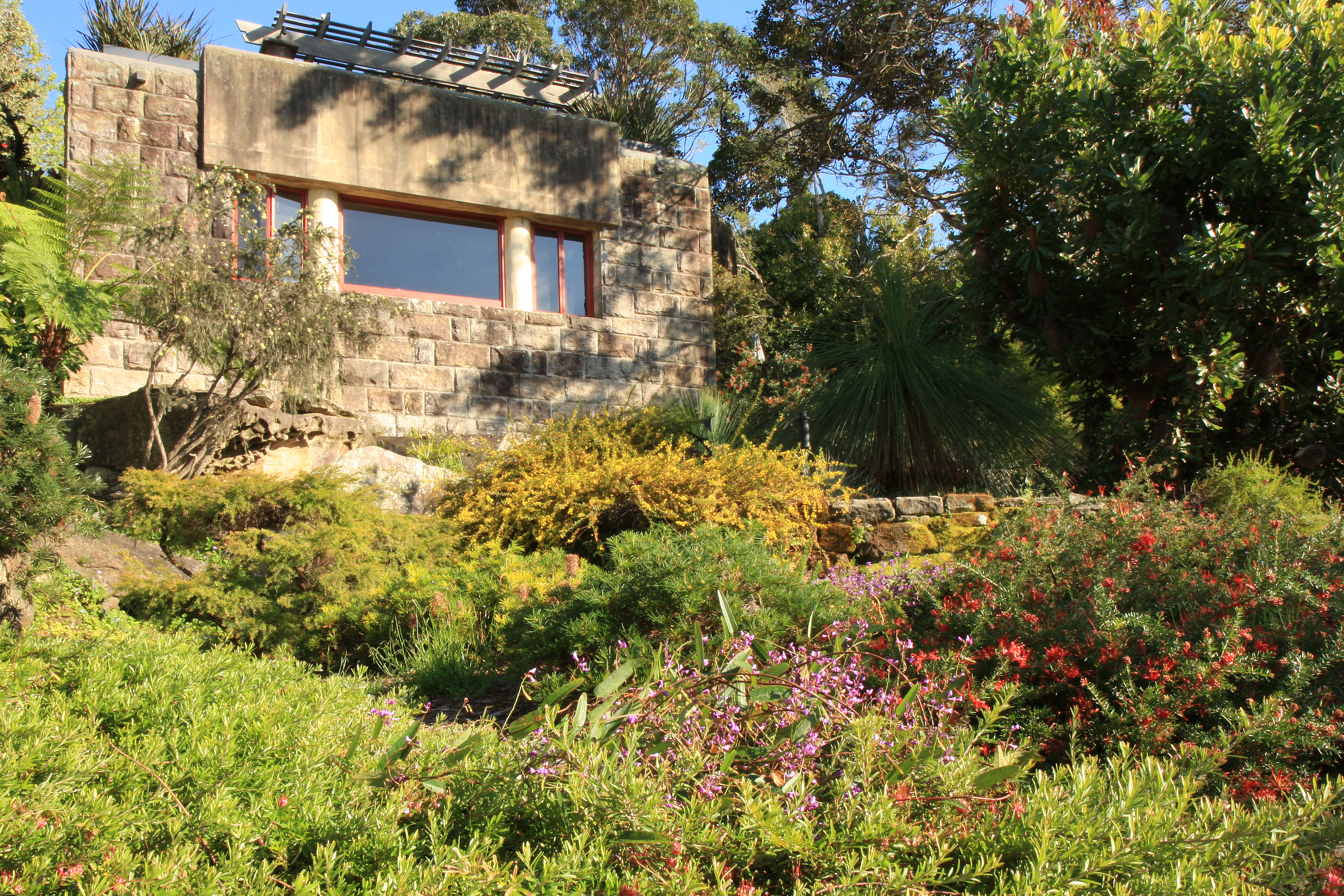
Fishwick House in bushland

Castlecrag has a number of heritage-listed sites, including:

- 375 Edinburgh Road: Buhrich House II
- 8 The Barbette: Duncan House (Castlecrag)
- 80 The Bulwark: The Glass House (Castlecrag)
- 15 The Citadel: Fishwick House

== Commercial area ==
The Quadrangle Shopping Village in Edinburgh Road featured an IGA supermarket until 2024 alongside other specialty shops. As of 2025, the quadrangle is being redeveloped into a mixed-residential space, though new plans submitted by the current developer of the site have not yet been approved. A row of shops is still present opposite and adjacent to the site.

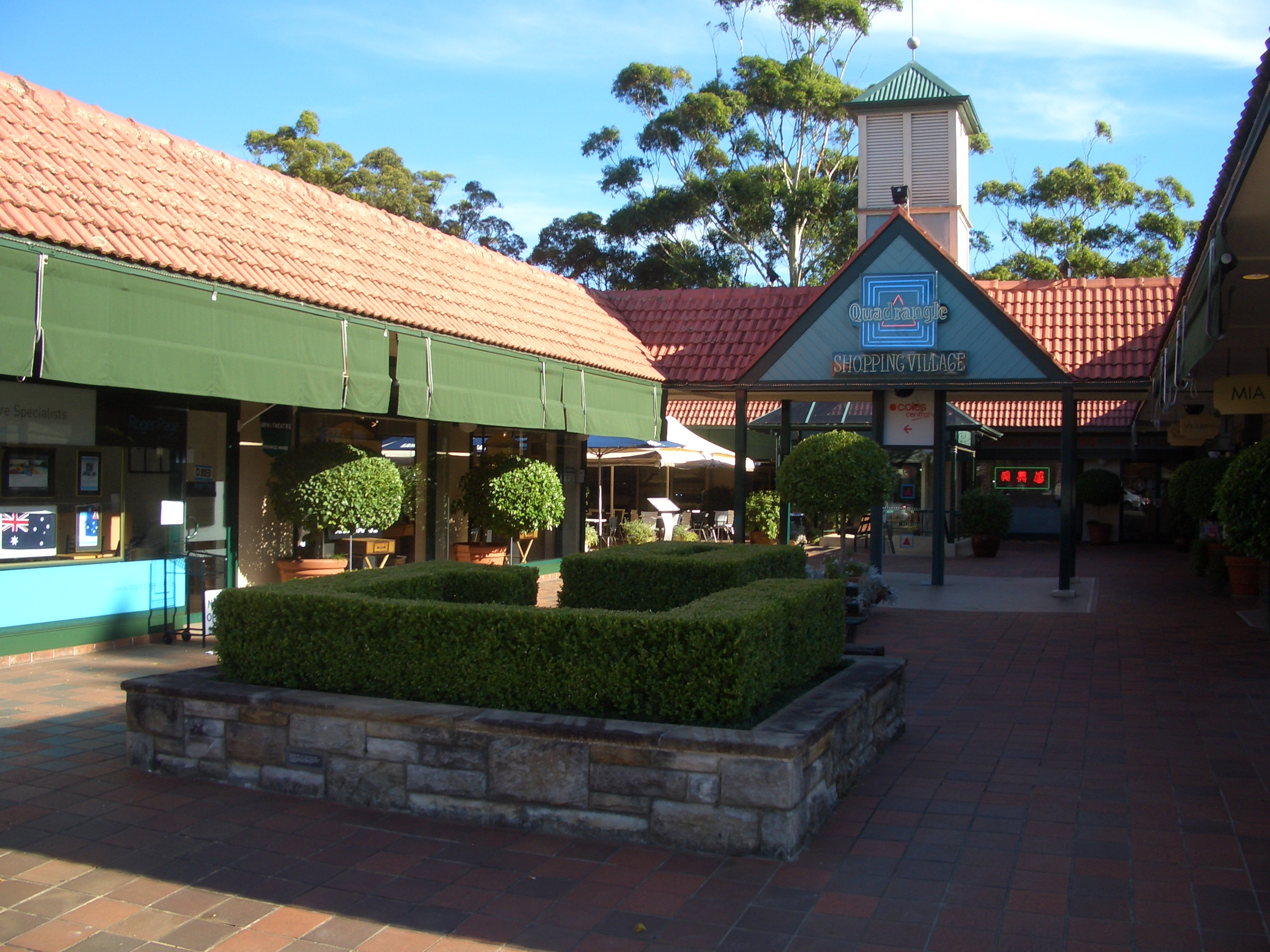
Quadrangle Shopping Village

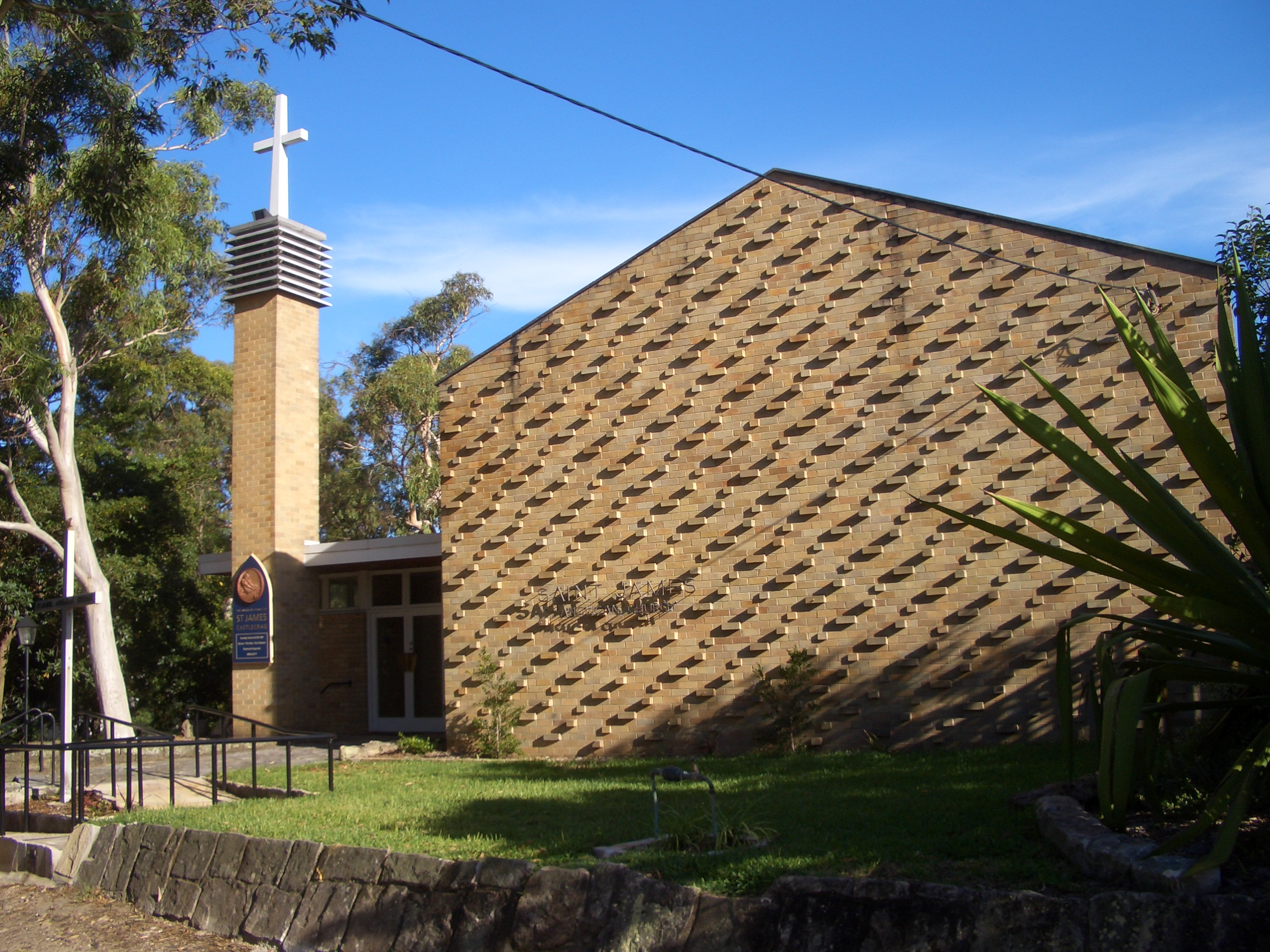
St James Anglican Church

== Population ==
Historical population
Year	Pop.	±%
2001	2,643	—
2006	2,807	+6.2%
2011	2,957	+5.3%
2016	2,939	−0.6%
2021	2,965	+0.9%

According to the 2021 census, there were 2,965 residents in Castlecrag. 66.1% of people were born in Australia. The next most common country of birth was England at 5.9%. 78.9% of people only spoke English at home. Other languages spoken at home included Mandarin at 4.3%. The most common responses for religion were No Religion 43.0%, Catholic 22.5%, Anglican 14.9% and Judaism 2.4%.

The median weekly household income was $4,675 compared with $1,746 for all of Australia. 88.3% of all occupied dwellings in Castlecrag were separate houses.

Castlecrag is a rather affluent harbourside area of Sydney. More than half of its households enjoy incomes that are within the top quartile of Sydney, but there are exceptions reflected in the median house price.

== Bibliography ==
- (The) Castlecrag Progress Association. (2011). Castlecrag history and time line. Retrieved 3 May 2011 from http://castlecrag.org.au/history/history.htm
- (The) Castlecrag Progress Association. (2011). Property and development. Retrieved 3 May 2011 from http://castlecrag.org.au/builtenvironment/builtEnvironment.htm
- Chambers, C. (2006–11). Griffins and the Australian bushland. Retrieved 3 May 2011 from http://www.griffinsociety.org/Lives_and_works/a_bushland.html
- Freestone, R. (1982). The garden city idea in Australia. Australian Geographical Studies, 20, pp. 24–48.
- Leslie, E. (1988). Municipality of Willoughby: The suburb of Castlecrag a community history. New South Wales: Willoughby Municipal Council.
- O’Donoghue, M. (2006–11). Castlecrag, Sydney. Retrieved 3 May 2011 from http://www.griffinsociety.org/Lives_and_works/a_castlecrag.html
- Spathopoulos, W. (2007). The Crag: Castlecrag 1924-1938. Blackheath: Brandl & Schlesinger.
- Walker, M., Kabos, A., & Weirick, J. (1994). Building for nature: Walter Burley Griffin and Castlecrag. Castlecrag: Walter Burley Griffin Society Incorporated.
- Willoughby City Council. (2011). Conservation areas: Griffin – Castlecrag. Retrieved 4 May 2011 from https://web.archive.org/web/20110331192929/http://www.willoughby.nsw.gov.au/your-neighbourhood/heritage/Place/Heritage-Conservation-Areas/6/
