= Marion Mahony Griffin =

American architect and artist (1871–1961)

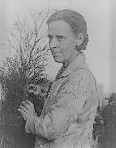
- Mahony Griffin in Sydney, 1930
- Born: Marion Lucy Mahony; February 14, 1871; Chicago, Illinois, US
- Died: August 10, 1961 (aged 90); Chicago, Illinois, US
- Burial place: Graceland Cemetery
- Education: Massachusetts Institute of Technology
- Occupations: Architect; artist
- Years active: 1890s–1950s
- Known for: Prairie School
- Spouse: Walter Burley Griffin (m. 1911; died 1937)

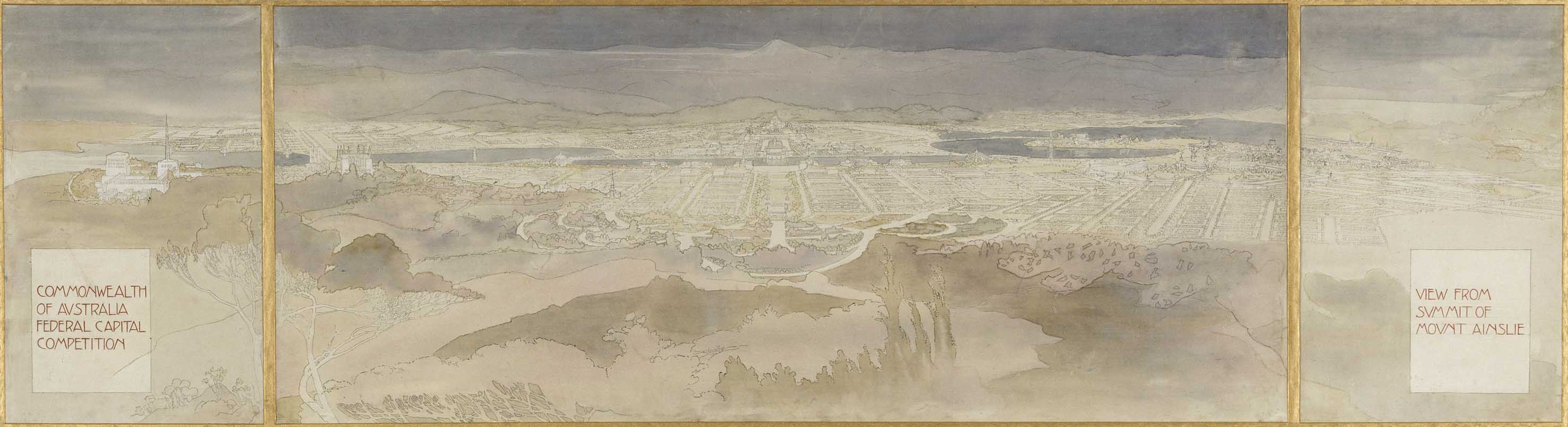
Watercolor from the Canberra Design

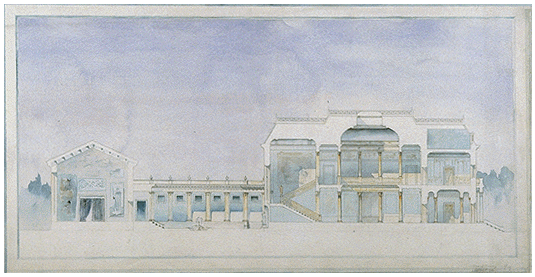
Artist's Studio (Section). Watercolor and ink by Marion Griffin 1894

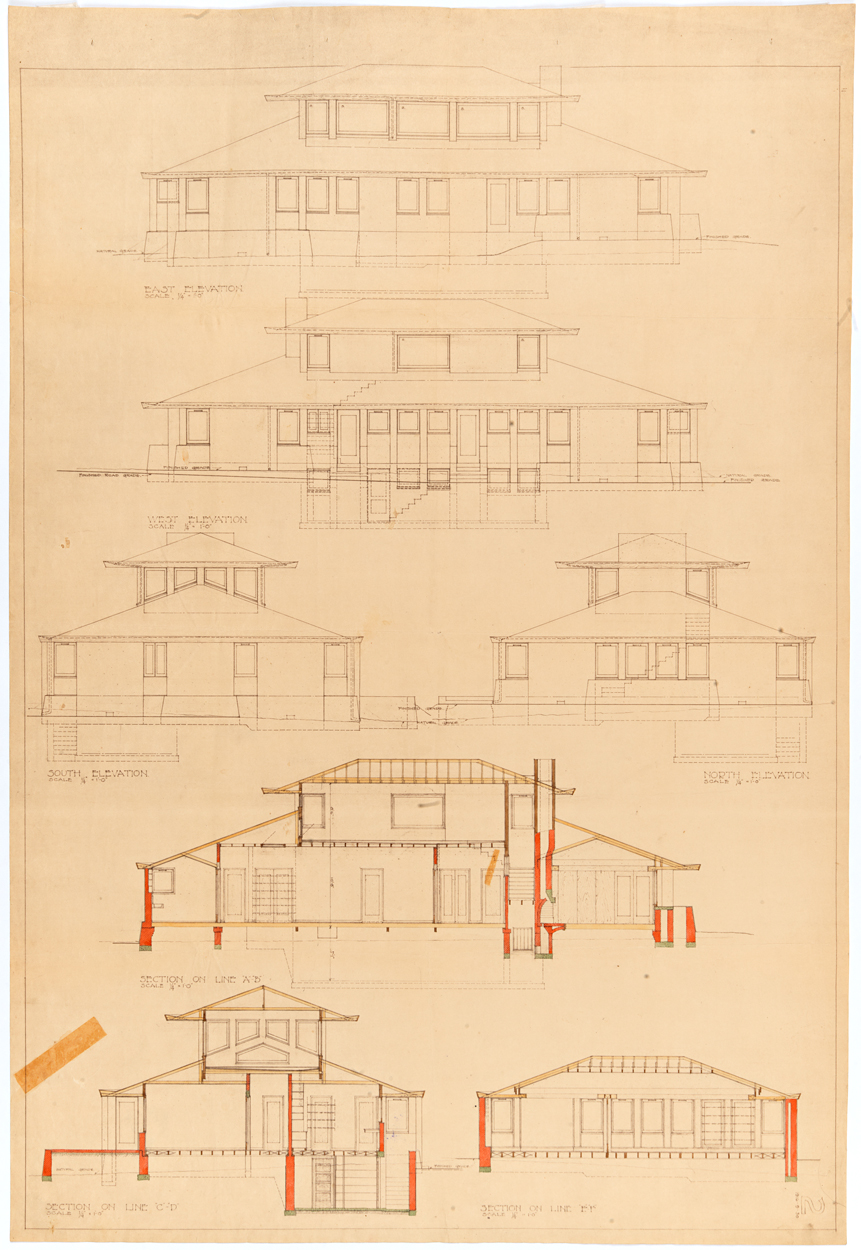
Design for Suburban Residence Exhibit plan 2

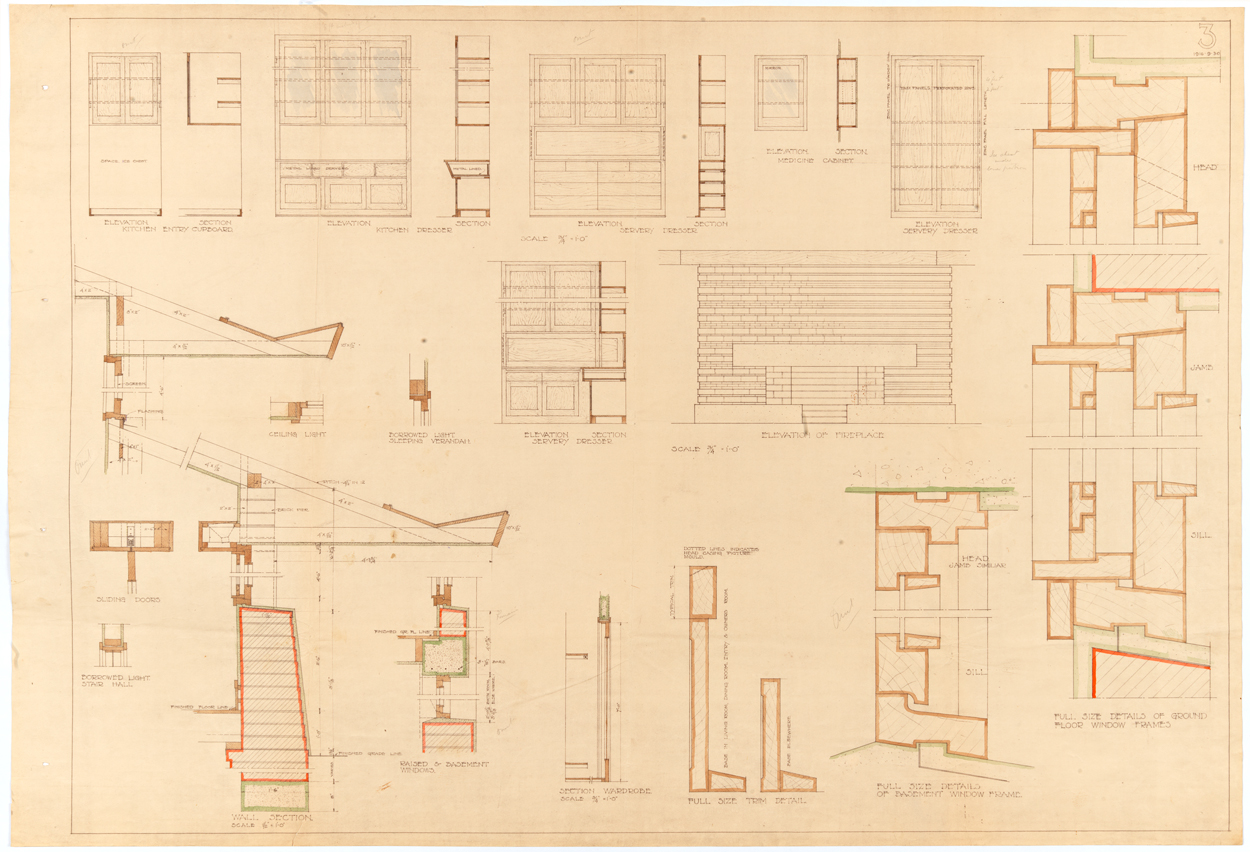
Design for Suburban Residence Exhibit Plan 1

Marion Mahony Griffin (née Marion Lucy Mahony; February 14, 1871 – August 10, 1961) was an American architect and artist. She was one of the first licensed female architects in the world, and is considered an original member of the Prairie School. Her work in the United States developed and expanded the American Prairie School, and her work in India and Australia reflected Prairie School ideals of indigenous landscape and materials in newly formed democracies. The scholar Debora Wood stated that Griffin "did the drawings people think of when they think of Frank Lloyd Wright (one of her collaborating architects)." According to architecture critic, Reyner Banham, Griffin was "America’s (and perhaps the world’s) first woman architect who needed no apology in a world of men."

She produced some of the finest architectural drawings in America and Australia, and was instrumental in envisioning the design plans for the capital city of Australia, Canberra. Towards the end of her life, she wrote The Magic of America, an autobiography accompanied with various illustrations dedicated toward showcasing her life's work and values.

== Early life and education ==
Mahony was born in 1871 in Chicago, Illinois, to Jeremiah Mahony, a journalist, poet, and teacher from Cork, Ireland, and Clara Hamilton, a schoolteacher. After the Great Chicago Fire in 1880, her family moved north of Chicago to nearby Winnetka. Scholars note that it is very likely that her family was heavily involved in the intellectual and Unitarian community there at the time, as both her parents were deeply ambitious about education and art. Winnetka's Unitarian Chapel often held discussions about the arts, politics, and social issues heavily revolving around democracy. Mahony often recalled her childhood in Winnetka in her autobiography, "The Magic of America", describing how she had become fascinated by the freeing nature and quickly disappearing landscape as suburban homes filled the area.At the time, Winnetka was known to be more "like a pioneer town than a suburb." This landscape inspired Mahony's focus on nature in her architectural practices, and her family's involvement in the intellectual community further influenced her democratic principles and philosophy.

After Mahony's father died by suicide in 1882, her mother decided to move out of Winnetka to the West Side of Chicago where she became an elementary school principal in a Chicago Public School to support her children. Her mother became a pioneer in public education, and was involved in many women's groups across the city. Mahony described her mother as "the most democratic of human beings", firsthand seeing her involvement with many social reformers, activists, artists, and intellectuals. She grew up with a range of female role models in Chicago. Anna Wilmarth, who was part of their inner circles personally funded Mahony's education at the Massachusetts Institute of Technology after she was influenced by her cousin, architect Dwight Perkins, to pursue an architectural degree there. After Sophia Hayden, Mahony was the second woman to have studied architecture and graduated from the Massachusetts Institute of Technology in 1894.

== Architectural career ==
=== Start of her career ===
After completing her degree at MIT, Mahony returned to Chicago and started her professional career at her cousin, Dwight Perkins' practice in Chicago’s Steinway Hall, a shared office of more progressive artists and architects during the time. Perkins himself was a former MIT student, however he never completed his architectural degree. Although Mahony was more educated than him, he fostered the significant improvement of her drafting and design skills as she gained hands-on experience. Subsequently, she became the first licensed female architect in Illinois in 1898. Through Perkins, Mahony met and was hired by Frank Lloyd Wright as his first employee in 1895. She was later hired and worked with Wright from 1895–1909 in both Chicago and his Oak Park studio. She went to work designing buildings, furniture, stained glass windows, and decorative panels. Barry Byrne, a coworker of Mahony's described her as “the most talented member of Frank Lloyd Wright’s staff."

=== Approach to architecture ===
From the progressive educational philosophies, and inner circles of women and social reformers that she was exposed to from a young age, Mahony's values heavily revolved around collaboration and spilled into most of her architectural work. In a field of competitive individualists, she saw architecture as a collective endeavor. In her autobiography she emphasized the advantages of working together, especially in creating spaces that were meant to bring people together. Further, her philosophy, reflecting the later formed Prairie School ideals, was rooted in the human relationship to nature and democracy. Almost always, she integrated architecture with the natural world, creating perspectives of landscapes working together with structures in her renderings. In her autobiography, her biggest discussions were centered around democracy, character, integrity, and the right to artistic expression.

=== Greatest contributions ===
Although Mahony was considered an illustrator or delineator of the work of other architects, her "rich and fruitful" graphic representation and style combined perspective, plan, and section on one sheet for the first time. Through this original style, Mahony challenged traditional rendering conventions during the time. She combined art and architecture in her draftsmanship, and was known to have an "exceptional feel" for linear compositions that integrated architecture with nature. Her interest in Japanese prints gave her several unique compositional techniques of color, depth, emphasis, and line weight that played a crucial role in the development of the Prairie School. This new presentation of designs was revolutionary in presenting architectural work to the world. Mahony's work became a powerful marketing tool, that enabled conversations with clients as they had become able to visualize the plans presented.

In the fifteen years that Mahony had worked for Wright, she was an important contributor to his reputation and brand identity, particularly to the influential Wasmuth Portfolio, for which Mahony had "contributed nearly half [of the drawings] which appear attributable." Her rendering of the K. C. DeRhodes House in South Bend, Indiana, in particular, was praised by Wright and many critics. Her presentation drawing of the home was exceptionally skillful with clear-cut lines, and her original use of stylized trees and flowers to frame the structure. The foliage was just as sharp as the structure presented, further highlighting her integration of architecture with the natural world.

=== Lack of credit ===
Wright understated the contributions of others of the Prairie School, Mahony included. A clear understanding of Marion Mahony's contribution to the architecture of the Oak Park Studio comes from Wright's son, John Lloyd Wright, who says that William Drummond, Francis Barry Byrne, Walter Burley Griffin, Albert Chase McArthur, Marion Mahony, Isabel Roberts, and George Willis were the draftsmen—the five men and two women who each made valuable contributions to Prairie-style architecture for which Wright became famous. Her watercolor renderings of buildings and landscapes became known as a staple of Wright's style, though she was never given credit by the famous architect. For example, Wright "desperately" tried to attribute the K. C. DeRhodes House to himself. He annotated the rendering writing "after FLLW and Hiroshige". Yet, Mahony's initials, "MLM", were included in very small print under the foliage of the rendering.

=== Mid-late career ===
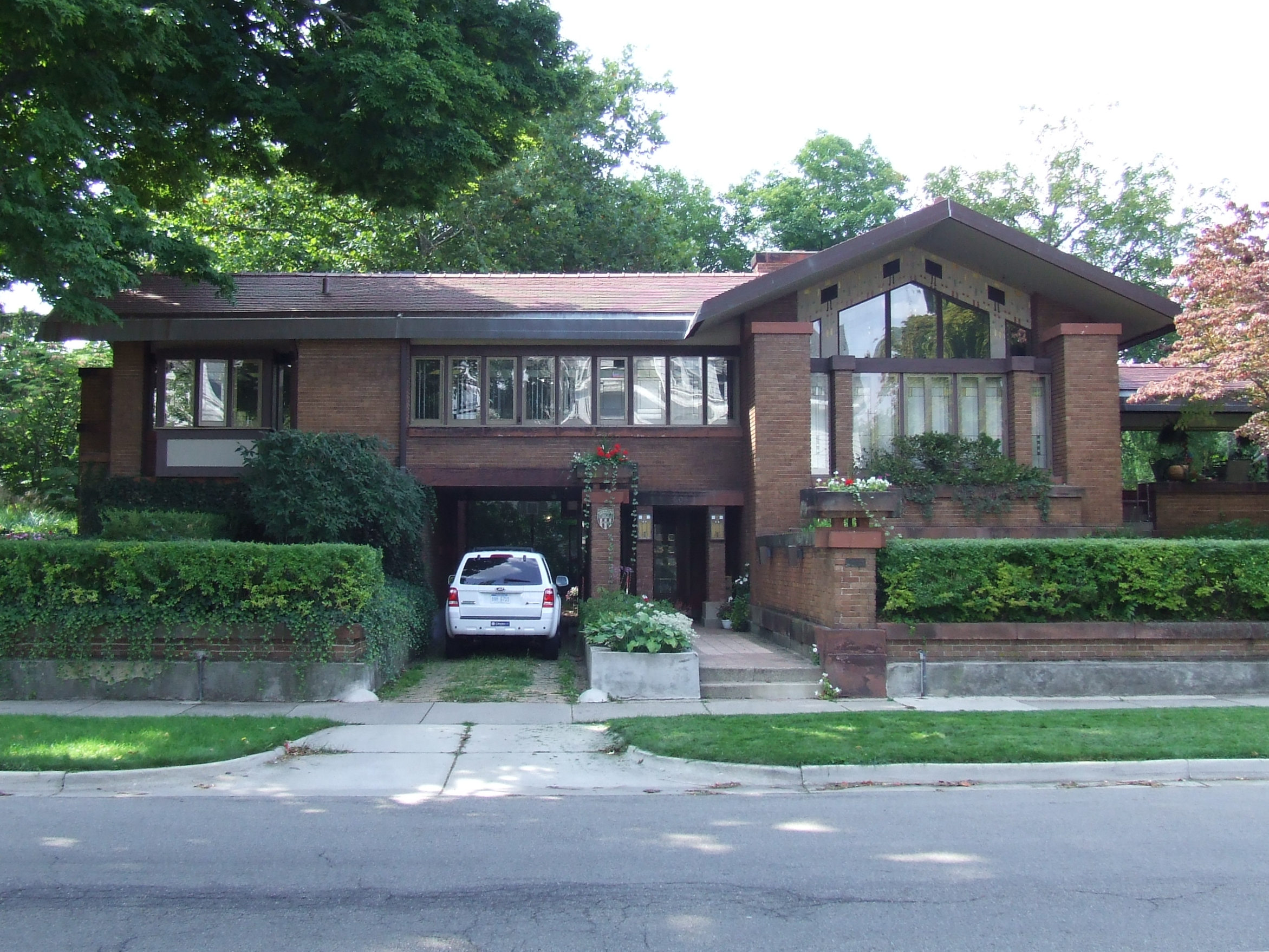
David M. Amberg House, 2009

When Wright eloped to Europe with Mamah Borthwick Cheney in 1909, he offered the Studio's work to Mahony but she declined. It is unclear whether Mahony had a positive or negative perception of Wright after having worked with him. In her autobiography she wrote, "The Chicago school died not only because of the cancer sore in it - one who originated very little but spent most of his time claiming everything and swiping everything." Research notes suggest that Mahony was referring to Wright however, she never explicitly made negative claims about him.

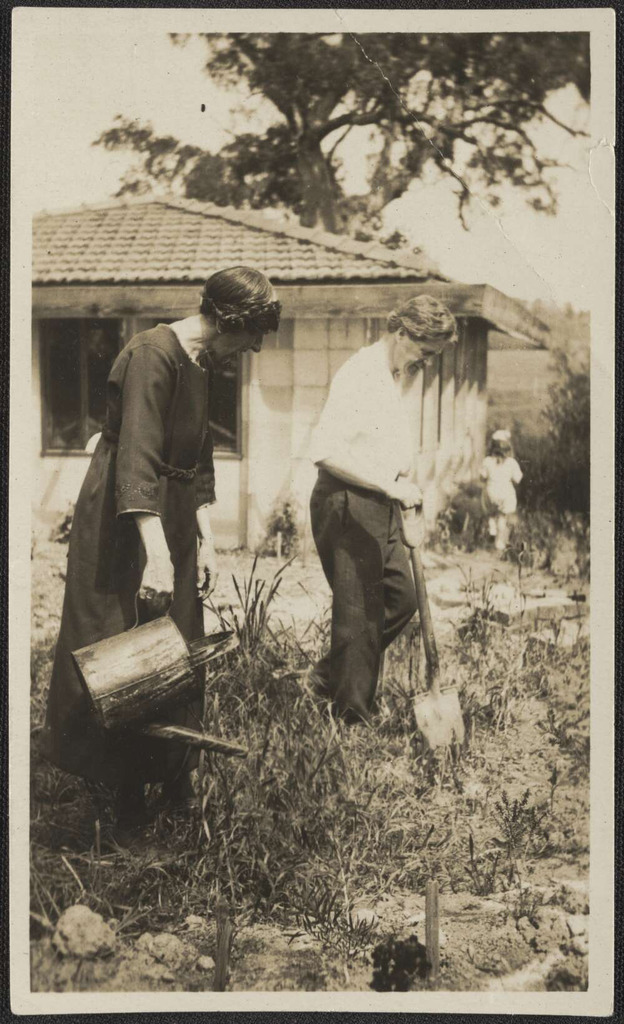
Marion Mahony Griffin and Walter Burley Griffin gardening in the backyard of "Pholiota", Heidelberg, Victoria, 1918

After Wright had gone, Hermann V. von Holst, who had taken on Wright's commissions, hired Mahony with the stipulation that she would have control of the design. In this capacity, Mahony was the architect for a number of commissions Wright had abandoned. Two examples were the first (unbuilt) design for Henry Ford's Dearborn mansion, Fair Lane and the Amberg House in Grand Rapids, Michigan. During this time, Mahony recommended Walter Burley Griffin to von Holst to develop landscaping for the area surrounding the three houses commissioned from Wright in Decatur, Illinois. Griffin was a fellow architect, a fellow ex-employee of Wright, and a leading member of the Prairie School of architecture.

Mahony and Griffin worked on the Decatur project before their marriage in 1911; afterward, Mahony worked in Griffin's practice. The two of them, developed the largest collection of Prairie Style homes surrounding a natural setting. They collaborated on various projects across the United States, Australia, and India. Mahony produced a visual solution to Griffin's renderings with the use the combination of illustration and elevation that created a totally new method of presentation. Architectural historians such as Thomas S. Hines, note that Mahony's watercolor perspectives of Griffins' design for Canberra, the new Australian capital, were instrumental in securing first prize in the international competition for the plan of the city. However, deeply rooted in her collaborative approach, she would publicly refer to her contributions as "our projects", often making note of the love and loyalty she had for her husband.

When Walter Burley Griffin was appointed Director of Design and Construction of Canberra in 1914, the couple moved to Australia to oversee the building of Canberra. Mahony managed the Sydney office and was responsible for the design of their private commissions. Cafe Australia, Newman College, and the Capitol Theatre were three architectural structures worked on by Mahony, and for which the couple hired local artists, including Bertha Merfield, in whose friendship Marion shared an interest in the decorative potential of the eucalyptus form, which they sketched together around Tasmania. Marion's memoirs record the rough journey across Bass Strait in the SS Loongana, compensated over December 1918–January 1919 with 'a wonderful fortnight which enabled me to add a number of unique trees to my set of Forest Portraits.'

In Australia, Mahony and Griffin was introduced to Anthroposophy and the ideas of Rudolf Steiner which they embraced enthusiastically, and in Sydney they joined the Anthroposophy Society. These would later have a great influence on her autobiography. In Australia, they pioneered the Knitlock construction method, inexactly emulated by Wright in his California textile block houses of the 1920s. Following the completion of the construction of the Capitol Theatre in 1924, Marion and her husband moved to Castlecrag and furthered its community development.

Later in 1936, Mahony Griffin traveled to India to work in her husband's practice in Lucknow. Little is known about her full function in the Lucknow office, however from writings between Walter Burley Griffin and his draftsman Mr. Halder, it's clear that she took on the role of managing the office, training, and supervising the student draftsmen. In a manuscript of the letter between the two included in "The Magic of America", Mr. Halder stated, "Marion is working like a slave and she is the only effective help I have had for this exhibition." In addition to this, she continued drafting and illustrating in her unique graphic style, yet it's hard to attribute which of her works belonged to her when both she and her husband signed their initials on them. Lucknow reinvigorated her interest in architecture as she finished the rendering of the library and museum for Raja of Mahmudabad as Walter Burley Griffin lay on his death bed. Her artistic approach in this piece was deemed to be an evolution of the renderings she had produced earlier. It was not only an expression of the building, but a work of graphic art that shared characteristics with the rendering of the DeRhodes house.

== Death and legacy ==
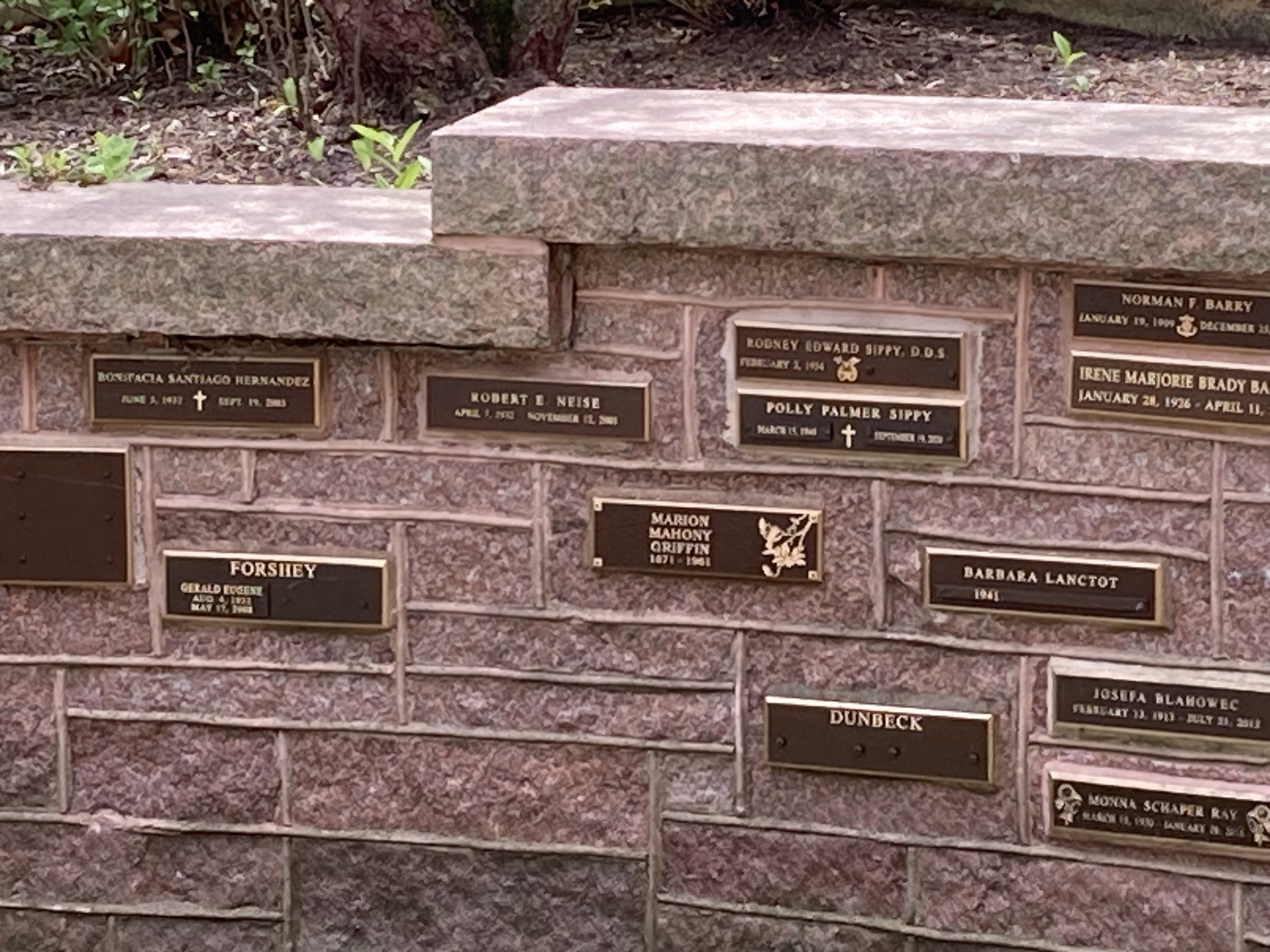
Griffin's grave at Graceland Cemetery

Marion Mahony Griffin did not stay long in Australia after Walter's death. By then in her late 60s, she returned to the United States and afterward was largely retired from her architectural career. "The one time she addressed the Illinois Society of Architects, she made no mention of her work, instead lectured the crowd on anthroposophy."

She did however spend the next twenty years working on a massive volume of 1,400 pages and 650 illustrations detailing her and Walter's working lives, which she titled "The Magic of America", which has yet to be formally published in book form. A manuscript deposited at the Art Institute of Chicago in 1949 was digitized, and since 2007 has been available online. In 2006 the National Library of Australia acquired a large collection of the Griffins' work including drawings, photographs, silk paintings and ephemera from the descendants of the Griffins’ Australian partner Eric Milton Nicholls.

Battling memory loss toward the end of her life, Marion Mahony Griffin died in poverty in 1961 at the age of 90. She was buried in Graceland Cemetery.

=== Public memory ===
Following her death, Marion Mahony Griffin was often only seen for her supporting role in the lives of Frank Lloyd Wright and her husband, Walter Burley Griffin. Despite her commentary on designs, compiled papers, and personal writings, her individual and unique contributions to the field were described as being 'for' other architects she worked with. Many of her renderings were captioned with being "for Frank Lloyd Wright" or "for Walter Burley Griffin." Over the years historians and scholars were consistently misinformed about her. Her name was often misspelled, and the discourse surrounding her name often went out of its way to describe her physical features rather than her work. She was often ridiculed for her late marriage to Griffin, and said she "lacked most feminine graces." It wasn't until later, that early characterizations of her were left behind, and she had begun to get credited for her work. Over a century later she would be known the "greatest architectural delineator of her generation" by architectural writer Reyner Banham. Although during her life, her talent was seen as only an extension of the work done by male architects, recent architectural historians now credit at least half of the drawings in Wright’s portfolio, Ausgeführte Bauten und Entwürfe, von Frank Lloyd Wright, “one of the three most influential architectural treatises of the twentieth century," to Mahony.

In 2015, the beach at Jarvis Avenue in Rogers Park, Chicago was named in Mahony Griffin's honor. When she returned to the United States in 1939, after her husband's death, she lived near the beach. The Australian Consul-General, Roger Price, attended the beach's dedication for the woman who was instrumental in the design the Australian capital.

Among the few works attributed to Mahony that survive in the United States is a small mural in the George B. Armstrong elementary school in Chicago, and some of the homes she had designed in Decatur, Illinois.

The Australian Institute of Architects, NSW Chapter, honored her work with an annual award, the Marion Mahony Griffin Prize, for a distinctive body of work by a female architect for architectural education, journalism, research, theory, a professional practice or built architectural work. Since 2006 the Victorian Chapter of the AIA has presented a named award annually known as the Marion Mahony Award for Interior Architecture.

=== Exhibitions ===
The following exhibitions have been displayed featured the work of Marion Mahony:

- 1998–1999: The Museum of Applied Arts & Sciences at Powerhouse Museum, Sydney held an exhibition entitled "Beyond Architecture: Marion Mahony and Walter Burley Griffin".
- 2013: An exhibition to celebrate the centenary of Canberra, held in the National Library of Australia and called "The Dream of a Century: the Griffins in Australia’s Capital", exhibited her drawings for the entire year.
- 2015: An exhibition of some of her work was held at the Block Museum of Northwestern University, Illinois, USA.
- 2016–2017: An exhibition was held at the Elmhurst History Museum, Illinois, USA.
- 2020–2021: An exhibition at the Museum of Sydney entitled "Paradise on Earth".
- 2022: An exhibition at the National Archives of Australia in Canberra entitled "Marion: the other Griffin".

== Architectural works ==
- All Souls Church (demolished), Evanston, Illinois – 1901
- The Gerald and Hattie Mahony Residence (demolished), Elkhart, Indiana – 1907
- David Amberg Residence, 505 College Avenue SE, Grand Rapids, Michigan – 1909
- Edward P. Irving Residence, 2 Millikin Place, Decatur, Illinois – 1909
- Robert Mueller Residence, 1 Millikin Place, Decatur, Illinois – 1909
- Adolph Mueller Residence, 4 Millikin Place, Decatur, Illinois – 1910
- Niles Club Company, Club House, Niles, Michigan – 1911
- Henry Ford Residence "FairLane" (unbuilt initial design; 1913)
- Koehne House (demolished 1974), Palm Beach, Florida – 1914
- Cooley Residence, Grand St. at Texas Avenue, Monroe, Louisiana
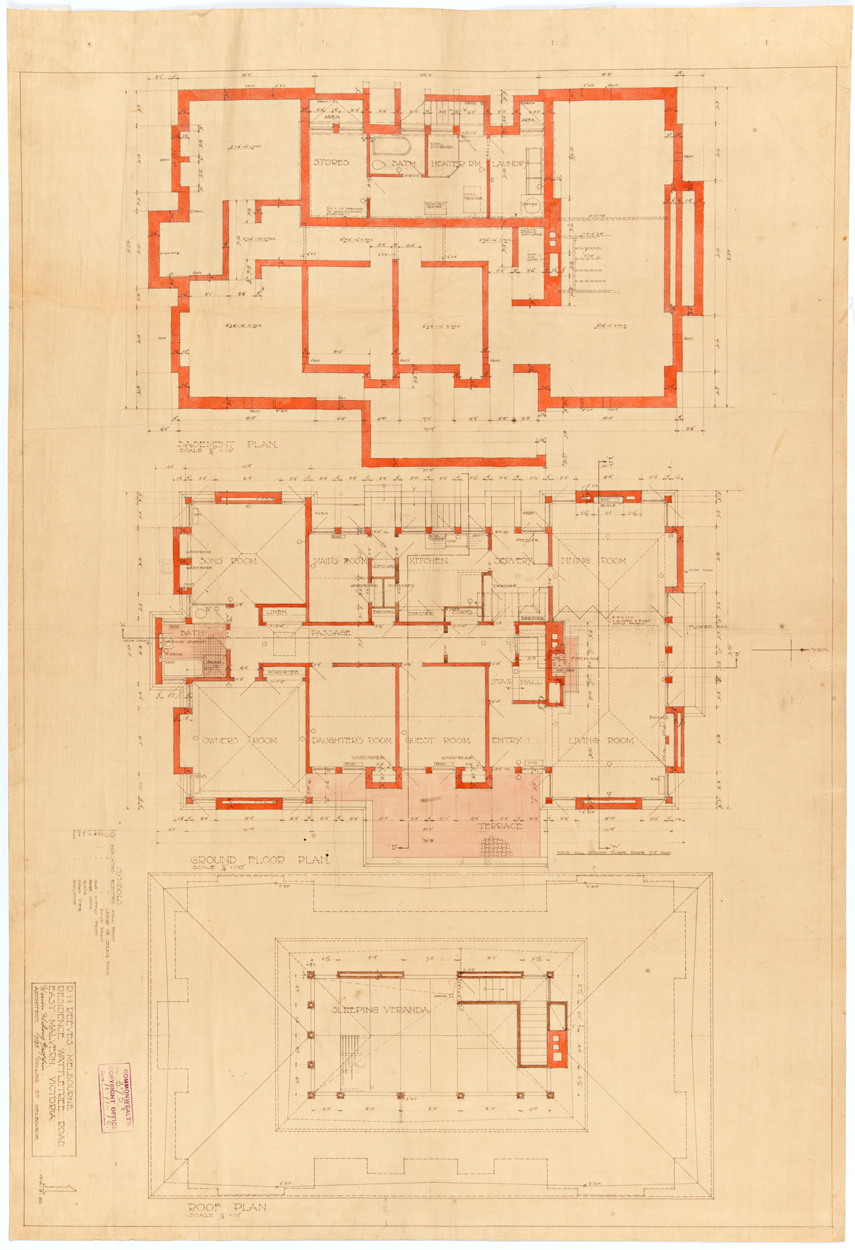
- Design for a Suburban Residence Exhibit Plan 3
  Fern Room, Cafe Australia, Melbourne, Australia – 1916
- Pholiota, 23 Glenard Drive, Eaglemont, Victoria (the Griffins own house) – 1920
- Capitol Theatre, Swanston Street, Melbourne, Australia – 1921–1923
- "Stokesay", residence of Mr. and Mrs. Onians, 289 Nepean Highway, Seaford, Victoria, Australia – 1925
- Ellen Mower Residence, 12 The Rampart, Castlecrag, Sydney – 1926
- Creswick Residence, Castlecrag, Sydney, Australia – 1926
- S.R. Salter Residence (Knitlock construction), Toorak, Victoria, Australia – 1927
- Vaughan Griffin Residence, 52 Darebin St., Heidelberg, Victoria, Australia – 1927

== Sources ==
- Birmingham, Elizabeth. "The Case of Marion Mahony Griffin and The Gendered Nature of Discourse in Architectural History." Women's Studies 35, no. 2 (March 2006): 87–123.
- Brooks, H. Allen, Frank Lloyd Wright and the Prairie School, Braziller (in association with the Cooper-Hewitt Museum), New York 1984; ISBN 0-8076-1084-4
- Brooks, H. Allen, The Prairie School, W.W. Norton, New York 2006; ISBN 0-393-73191-X
- Brooks, H. Allen (editor), Prairie School Architecture: Studies from "The Western Architect", University of Toronto Press, Toronto & Buffalo 1975; ISBN 0-8020-2138-7
- Brooks, H. Allen, The Prairie School: Frank Lloyd Wright and his Midwest Contemporaries, University of Toronto Press, Toronto 1972; ISBN 0-8020-5251-7
- Hasbrouk, Wilbert R. 2012. "Influences on Frank Lloyd Wright, Blanche Ostertag and Marion Mahony." Journal of Illinois History 15, no. 2: 70–88. America: History & Life
- Korporaal, Glenda and Marion Mahony Griffin (2015) Making Magic: The Marion Mahony Griffin Story ISBN 0-9924769-0-9
- Kruty, Paul, "Griffin, Marion Lucy Mahony", American National Biography Online, February 2000.
- Van Zanten, David (editor) Marion Mahony Reconsidered, University of Chicago Press, 2011; ISBN 978-0-226-85081-8
- Waldheim, Charles, Katerina Rüedi, Katerina Ruedi Ray; Chicago Architecture: Histories, Revisions, Alternatives, University of Chicago Press, 2005; ISBN 0-226-87038-3, ISBN 978-0-226-87038-0
- Wood, Debora (editor), Marion Mahony Griffin: Drawing the Form of Nature, Mary and Leigh Block Museum of Art and Northwestern University Press, Evanston, Illinois 2005; ISBN 0-8101-2357-6
- Kruty, Paul., and Paul E. Sprague. Marion Mahony and Millikin Place: Creating a Prairie School Masterpiece With the Help of Frank Lloyd Wright, Herman Von Holst, and Walter Burley Griffin. St. Louis, Mo.: Walter Burley Griffin Society of America, 2007.

== External links and further readings ==
- Pioneering Women of American Architecture, Marion Mahony Griffin
- "Exhibit honors unsung architect Marion Mahony Griffin", Chicago Tribune, October 11, 2016
- Marion Mahony Griffin, Digital Projects, New-York Historical Society
- Walter Burley Griffin and Marion Mahony Griffin architectural drawings, circa 1909–1937.Held by the Department of Drawings & Archives, Avery Architectural & Fine Arts Library, Columbia University.
- Biographical notes at MIT
- Marion Mahony Griffin: Drawing the Form of Nature an exhibition of Mahony Griffin's graphic art at the Block Museum, Northwestern University, United States of America
- The Magic of America: Electronic Edition online version of Marion Mahony Griffin's unpublished manuscript, made available through the Art Institute of Chicago
- "Rediscovering a Heroine of Chicago Architecture", New York Times, January 1, 2008
- Bronwyn Hanna (2008). "Griffin, Marion Mahony". Dictionary of Sydney. Dictionary of Sydney Trust.[CC-By-SA]
- National Archives of Australia
- Willoughby City Council Heritage
- Places Journal, Marion Mahony Griffin
- National Library of Australia: Griffin and Early Canberra Collection
- https://www.griffinsociety.org/marion-mahony-griffin/.
- Watson, Anne (1998). Beyond Architecture: Marion Mahony and Walter Burley Griffin. Sydney, Australia: Powerhouse Publishing. ISBN 1-86317-068-5.
- Kruty, Paul., and Paul E. Sprague. Marion Mahony and Millikin Place: Creating a Prairie School Masterpiece With the Help of Frank Lloyd Wright, Herman Von Holst, and Walter Burley Griffin. St. Louis, Mo.: Walter Burley Griffin Society of America, 2007.
