= William H. Emery Jr. House =

Historic house in Illinois, United States

- U.S. National Register of Historic Places
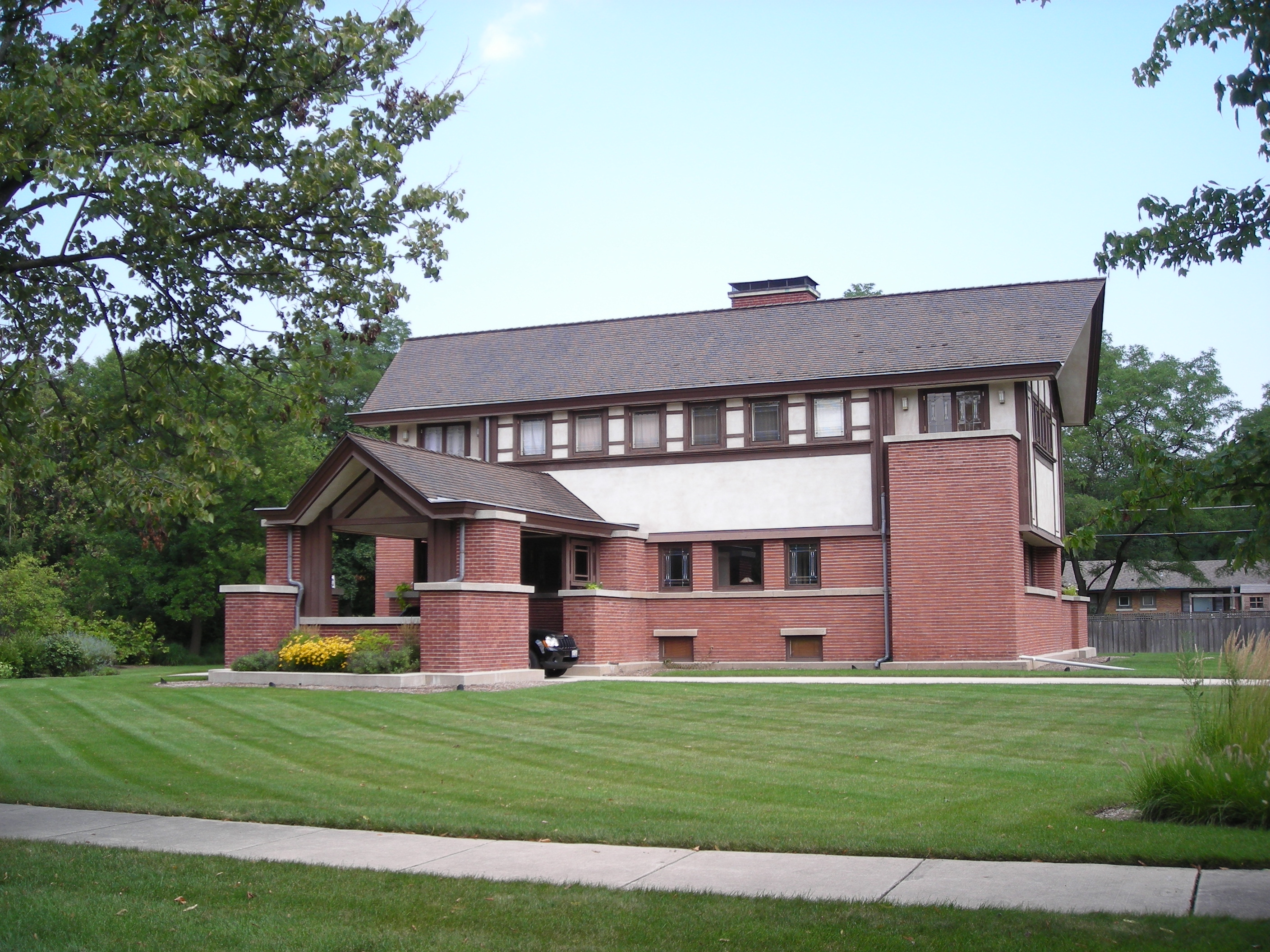

- Location within Illinois Location within the United States
- Location: 281 Arlington Ave. Elmhurst, DuPage County, Illinois, U.S.
- Coordinates: 41°53′39″N 87°56′18″W
- Built: 1903
- Architect: Walter Burley Griffin
- Architectural style: Prairie School
- NRHP reference No.: 04000421
- Added to NRHP: May 12, 2004

William H. Emery Jr. House is a Prairie School residence in Elmhurst, Illinois. It was one of the first independent commissions for Walter Burley Griffin.

== History ==
William Emery Sr. moved to Chicago, Illinois, and purchased the Seth Wadhams farm in Elmhurst in 1887. Aside from profits made from developing the farm, Emery served as president of the Elmhurst school board, the Elmhurst Golf Club, and the New England Society of Chicago. Emery also had an important role in bringing electricity and water supply to the town. Emery had six children, including William H. Emery Jr. The younger Emery was a personal friend to architect Walter Burley Griffin, whom he met in school. Griffin had designed the Elmhurst Golf Club (now demolished), but the Emery house was his first residential commission. Emery had ideas about what he wanted his house to look like, and believed that Griffin's mentor Frank Lloyd Wright would not be tolerant of his opinions. The house was a wedding gift from the senior Emery to the junior Emery and was completed in 1903. The 1909 William B. Sloane House at 248 Arlington Avenue is the only other Griffin-designed residence in Elmhurst. The house was purchased and restored by architect Edward L. Balluff and his wife Gail in 1979, and later placed on the National Register of Historic Places in May 2004.

== Architecture ==
The property on which the house was built was part of the original Emery land claim, now at the northeast corner of Arlington Avenue and Adelia Street. The lot is rectangular at approximately 175 by 190 feet (53 m × 58 m). The house is 61 by 33 feet (19 m × 10 m) with the longer axis parallel to Arlington Avenue. It is rectangular with two exceptions: the porte cochere extending to the west and two-story wing on the east. A semicircular drive from Arlington provides access to the porte cochere. The foundation is concrete and is built mostly with red brick, concrete, stone-colored stucco, and wood trim. The cedar-shingled gable roof is high pitched, unusual for a Prairie School design, and was probably influenced by Japanese architecture.
