= Ridge Historic District =

Historic district in Illinois, United States

- U.S. National Register of Historic Places
- U.S. Historic district
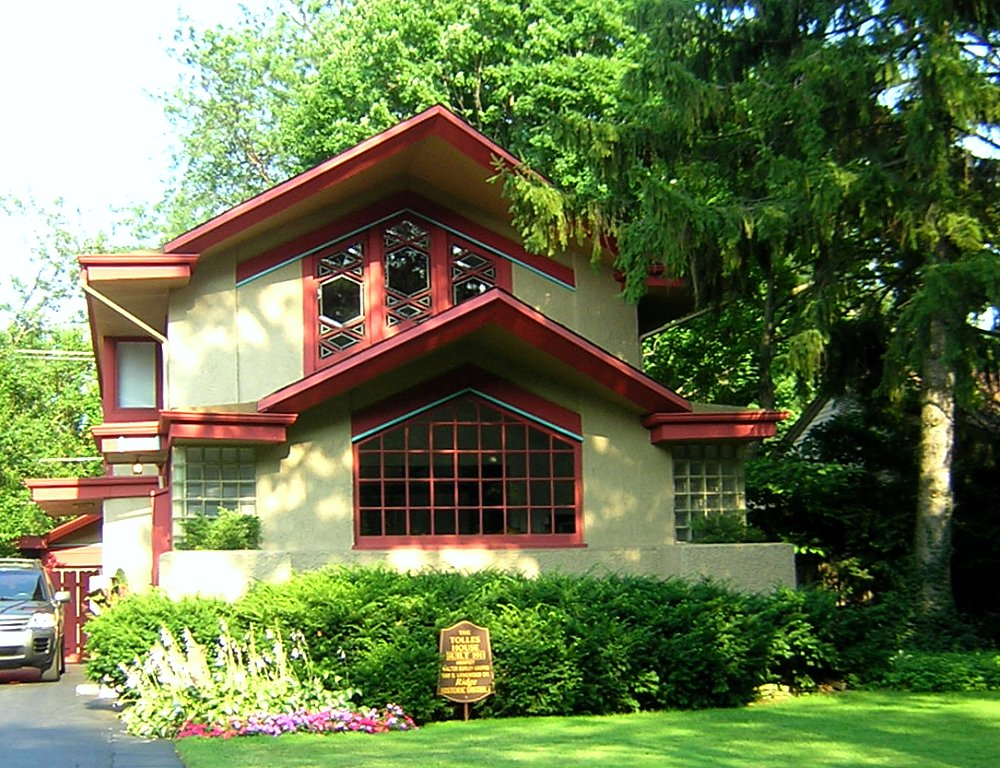

- Location within Chicago metropolitan area Location within Illinois Location within the United States
- Location: Roughly bounded by RR tracks, 87th, Prospects, Homewood, 115th, Lothair, Hamilton, and Western Sts., Chicago, Illinois
- Coordinates: 41°42′36″N 87°40′13″W
- Area: 212 acres (86 ha)
- NRHP reference No.: 76000703
- Added to NRHP: May 28, 1976

The Ridge Historic District is a residential historic district in the Beverly and Morgan Park neighborhoods of Chicago, Illinois. As its name suggests, the district is centered on a ridge, making it one of the few areas of high ground in the generally flat city. Development in the district began in the late nineteenth century, as the Rock Island Line brought access to downtown jobs and several private schools opened in the area, and continued through the early twentieth century. Real estate atop the ridge was particularly sought after for its views and attracted wealthy residents, while the area's working-class population typically lived near the railroad stations. The district's houses exhibit a variety of popular architectural styles from its period of growth; its Prairie School architecture is especially noteworthy, including twelve designs by Walter Burley Griffin and multiple Frank Lloyd Wright works.

The district was added to the National Register of Historic Places on May 28, 1976.
