= Gauler Twin Houses =

Houses in Chicago, Illinois

- U.S. National Register of Historic Places
- Chicago Landmark
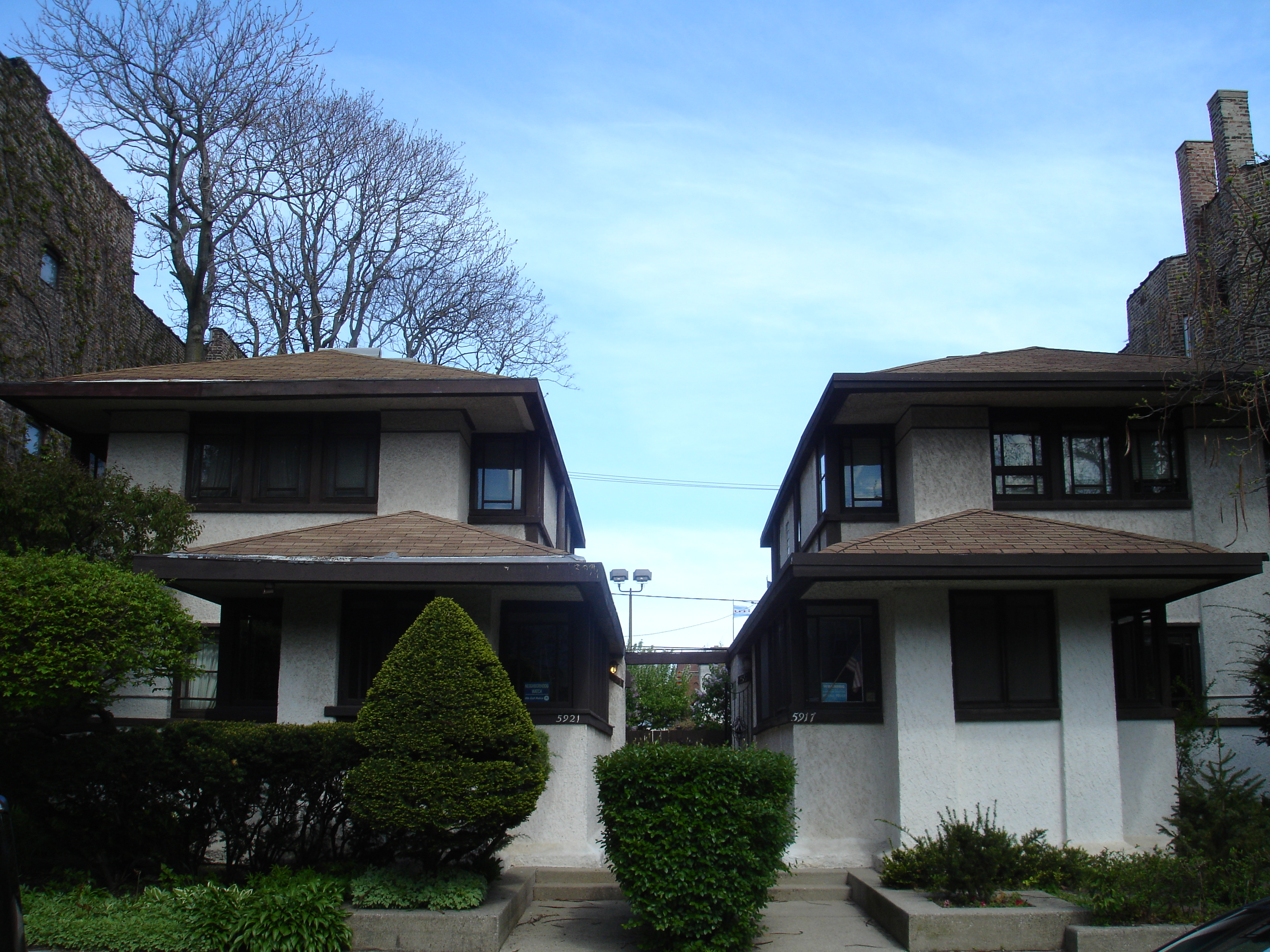

- Location within Illinois Location within the United States
- Location: 5917-5921 N. Magnolia Ave., Chicago, Illinois
- Coordinates: 41°59′23″N 87°39′41″W
- Built: 1908
- Architect: Walter Burley Griffin
- Architectural style: Prairie School
- NRHP reference No.: 77000475

Significant dates
- Added to NRHP: June 17, 1977
- Designated CHICL: June 28, 2000

The Gauler Twin Houses are two specular Prairie style houses located at 5917 and 5921 North Magnolia Avenue in Chicago, Illinois, United States. The houses were built in 1908 by Walter Burley Griffin for John Gauler, a land speculator. They were added to the National Register of Historic Places on June 17, 1977 and designated a Chicago Landmark on June 28, 2000.
