= Walter Burley Griffin =

American architect (1876–1937)

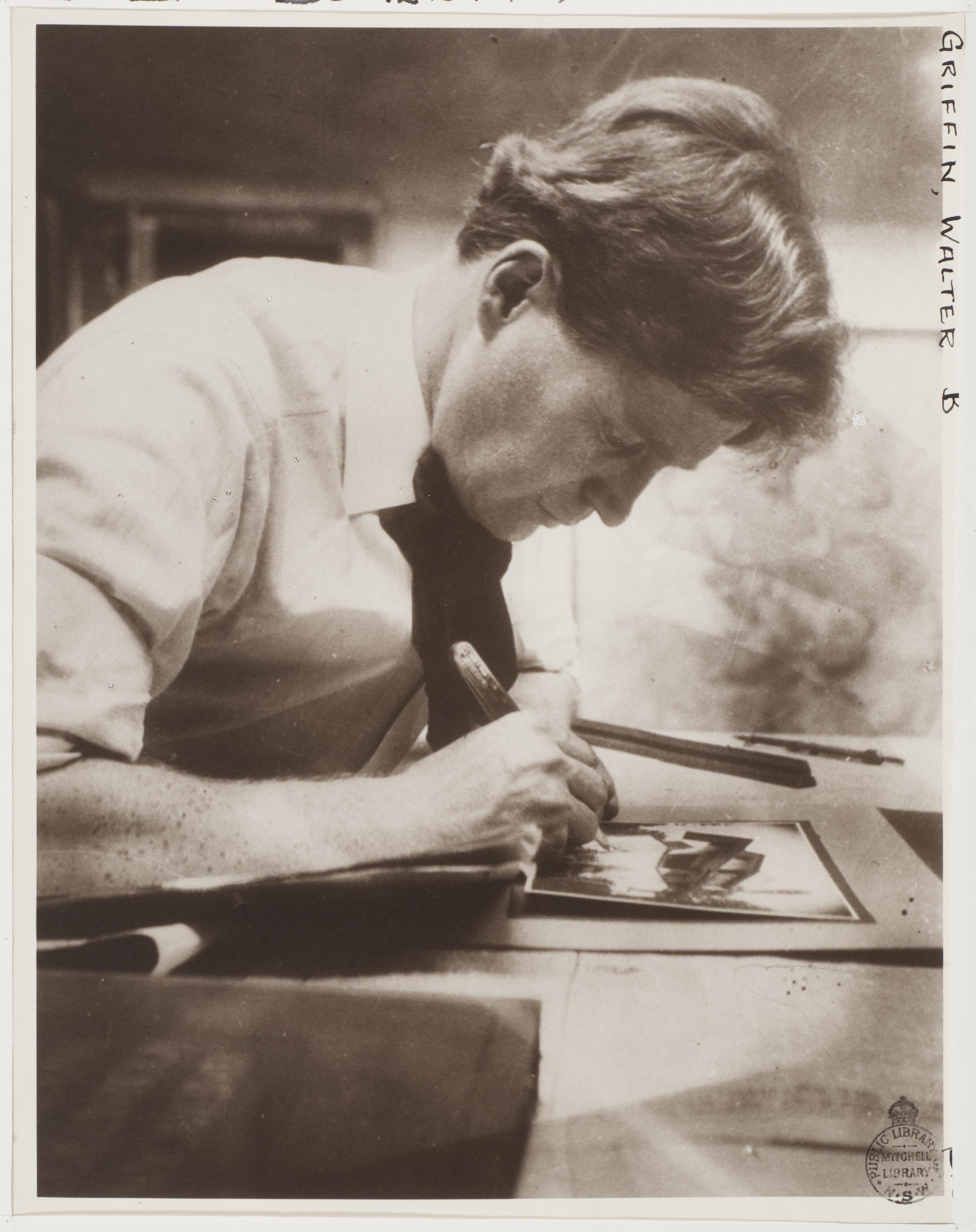
- Griffin in 1912
- Born: November 24, 1876; Maywood, Illinois, U.S.
- Died: February 11, 1937 (aged 60); Lucknow, United Provinces, British India
- Education: University of Illinois at Urbana–Champaign
- Occupation: Architect
- Years active: 1890s–1930s
- Known for: Prairie School
- Notable work: Design/plan of Canberra, Australia and Griffith, Australia
- Spouse: Marion Mahony Griffin (m. 1911)

Walter Burley Griffin (November 24, 1876 – February 11, 1937) was an American architect and landscape architect. He designed Canberra, Australia's capital city, the New South Wales towns of Griffith and Leeton, and, with his wife, the Sydney suburb of Castlecrag.

Influenced by the Chicago-based Prairie School, Griffin developed a unique modern style in partnership with his wife Marion Mahony Griffin. In 28 years they designed over 350 buildings, landscape and urban-design projects as well as designing construction materials, interiors, furniture and other household items.

== Early life ==
Griffin was born on November 24, 1876, in Maywood, Illinois, a suburb of Chicago. He was the eldest of the four children of George Walter Griffin, an insurance agent, and Estelle Burley Griffin. His family moved to Oak Park and later to Elmhurst. As a boy, he had an interest in landscape design and gardening, and his parents allowed him to landscape the yard at their new home in Elmhurst. Griffin attended Oak Park High School. He considered studying landscape design but was advised by the landscape gardener O. C. Simonds to pursue a more lucrative profession.

Griffin chose to study architecture, and, in 1899, completed his bachelor's degree in architecture at the University of Illinois at Urbana–Champaign. The University of Illinois program was run by Nathan Clifford Ricker, a German-educated architect, who emphasized the technical aspects of architecture. During his studies, he also took courses in horticulture and forestry.

== Chicago career ==
After his studies, Griffin moved to Chicago and was employed as a draftsman for two years in the offices of progressive architects Dwight H. Perkins, Robert C. Spencer Jr., and H. Webster Tomlinson in "Steinway Hall". Griffin's employers worked in the distinctive Prairie School style. This style is marked by horizontal lines, flat roofs with broad overhanging eaves, solid construction, craftsmanship, and strict discipline in the use of ornament. Louis Sullivan was influential among Prairie School architects and Griffin was an admirer of his work, and of his philosophy of architecture which stressed that design should be free of historical precedent. Other architects of that school include George Grant Elmslie, George Washington Maher, William Gray Purcell, William Drummond and most importantly, Frank Lloyd Wright.

In July 1901, Griffin passed the new Illinois architects' licensing examination and this permitted him to enter private practice as an architect. He began working in Frank Lloyd Wright's famous Oak Park, Illinois, studios. Although he was never made a partner, Griffin oversaw the construction on many of Wright's noted houses including the Willits House in 1902 and the Larkin Administration Building built in 1904. From 1905 he also began to supply landscape plans for Wright's buildings. Wright allowed Griffin and his other staff to undertake small commissions of their own. The William Emery house, built in Elmhurst, Illinois, in 1903 was such a commission. While working for Wright, Griffin fell in love with Mr. Wright's sister, Maginel Wright. He proposed marriage to her, but his affections for her were not returned, and she refused.

In 1906, he resigned his position at Wright's studio and established his own practice at Steinway Hall. Griffin and Wright had fallen out over events following Mr. Wright's trip to Japan in 1905. While Wright was away for five months, Griffin ran the practice. When Wright returned, he told Griffin that he had overstepped his responsibilities, completing several of Wright's jobs, and sometimes substituting his own building designs. Further, Wright had borrowed money from Griffin to pay for his travels abroad, and then he tried to pay off his debts to Griffin with prints he had acquired in Japan. It became clear to Griffin then that Wright would not make Griffin a partner in his business.

Griffin's first independent commission was a landscape design for the State Normal School at Charleston, Illinois, that became Eastern Illinois University. In the fall of 1906, he received his first residential job from Harry Peters. The Peters' House was the first house designed with an L-shaped or open floor plan. The L-shape was an economical design and easily constructed. From 1907 to 1914, several houses designed by Griffin were built on the far southwest side of Chicago in the city's Beverly and Morgan Park, Chicago neighborhoods. In 1981, the city of Chicago granted landmark status to 13 of these Prairie-style bungalows in Beverly along the 1700 block of West 104th Place, 12 blocks of Longwood Drive between West 98th and 110th Streets, and three blocks of Seeley Avenue. With seven of these houses being located on West 104th Place—comprising the largest concentration of original prairie style homes built in Chicago—the street as it runs between Hale Avenue on the west to Prospect Avenue on the east was designated the Griffin Place Historic District, which comprises a part of the larger Ridge Historic District.

In 1911, Griffin developed 'Solid Rock' house for William F. Tempel in Winnetka, Illinois. It was the first house built by Griffin in his mature style and of reinforced concrete.

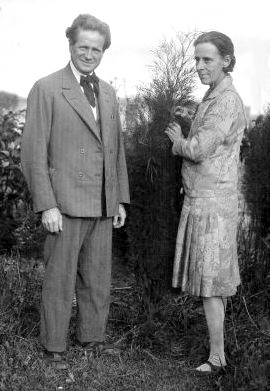
Walter Burley Griffin and Marion Mahony Griffin at Castlecrag, Sydney on July 27, 1930

On June 29, 1911, Griffin married Marion Lucy Mahony, a graduate of the Massachusetts Institute of Technology in architecture. She was employed first in Wright's office, and then by Hermann V. von Holst, who had taken over Wright's work in America when Wright left for Europe in 1909. Marion Mahony recommended to von Holst that he hire Griffin to develop a landscape plan for the area surrounding the three houses on Millikin Place for which Wright had been hired in Decatur, Illinois. Mahony and Griffin worked closely on the Decatur project immediately before their marriage.

After their marriage, Mahony went to work in Griffin's practice. A housing development with several homes designed by Griffin and Mahony, Rock Crest – Rock Glen in Mason City, Iowa, is seen as their most dramatic American design development of the decade and remains the largest collection of Prairie Style homes surrounding a natural setting.

From 1899 to 1914, Griffin created more than 130 designs in his Chicago office for buildings, urban plans and landscapes; half of these were built in the mid-western states of Illinois, Iowa, Michigan and Wisconsin.

The relationship between Griffin and Frank Lloyd Wright cooled in the years following Griffin's departure from Wright's firm in 1906. With Walter and Marion's wedding, Wright started to feel they were "against him". After the Griffins' win in the Australian federal capital design competition, and resultant front-page coverage in The New York Times, Wright and Griffin never spoke to each other again. In later years, whenever Griffin was brought up in conversation Wright would downplay his achievements and refer to him as a draftsman.

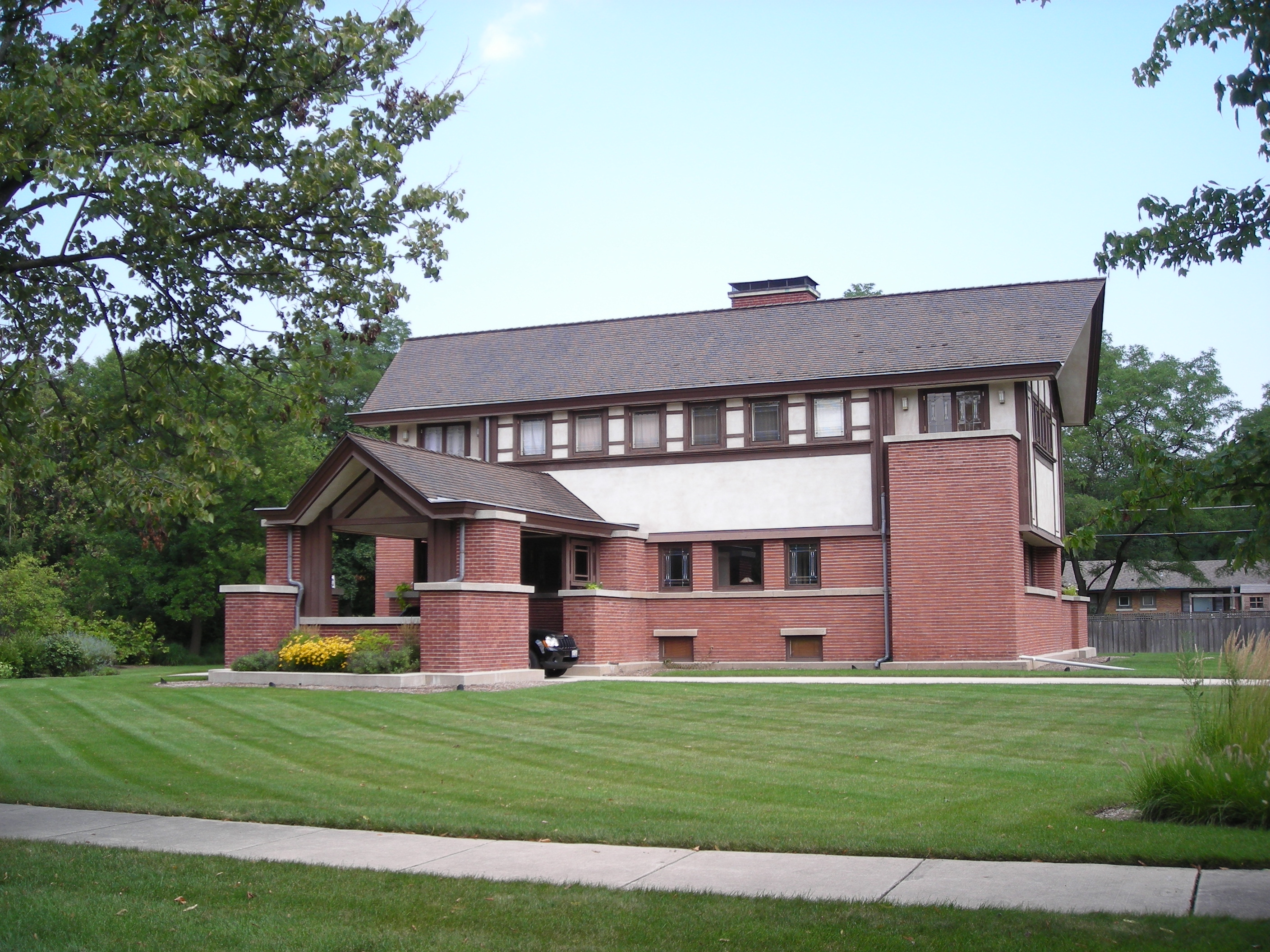
William H. Emery, Jr. House, 1903

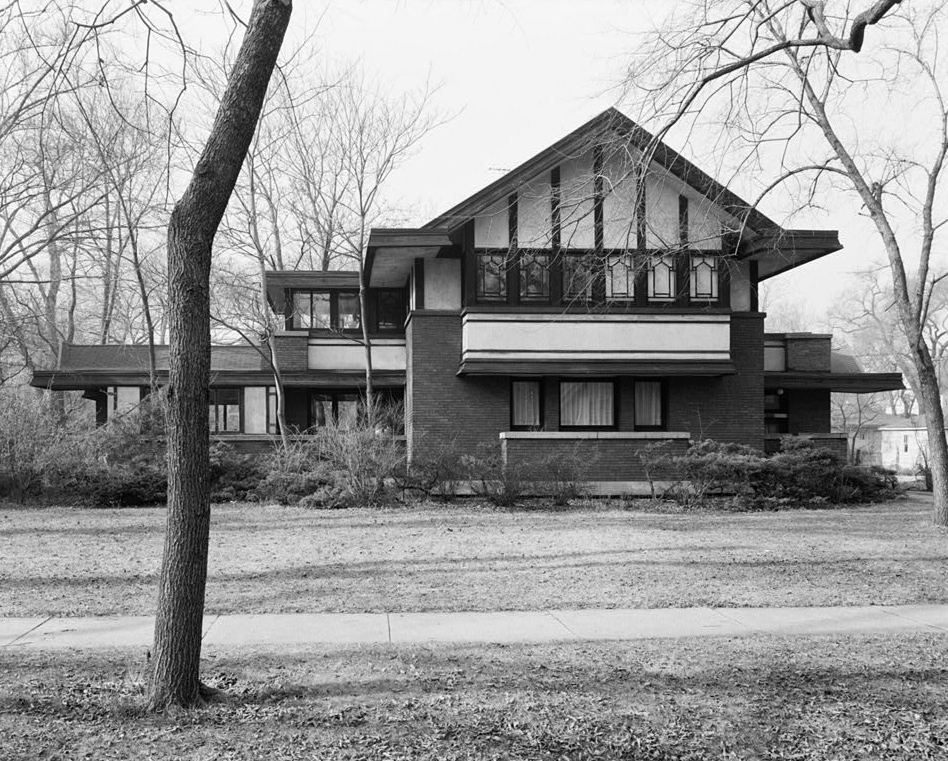
Frederick Carter House 1910

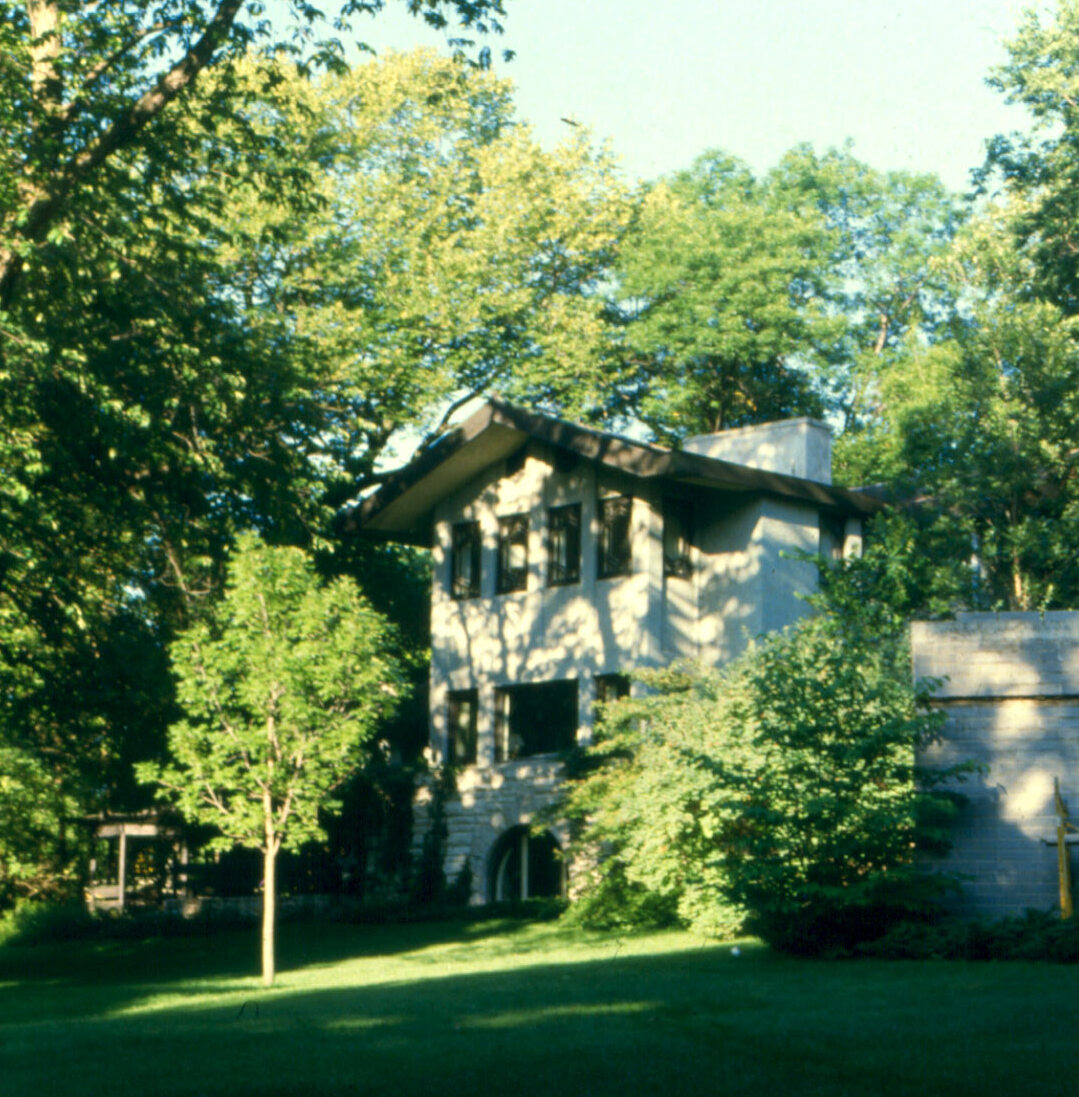
Page House, 1912

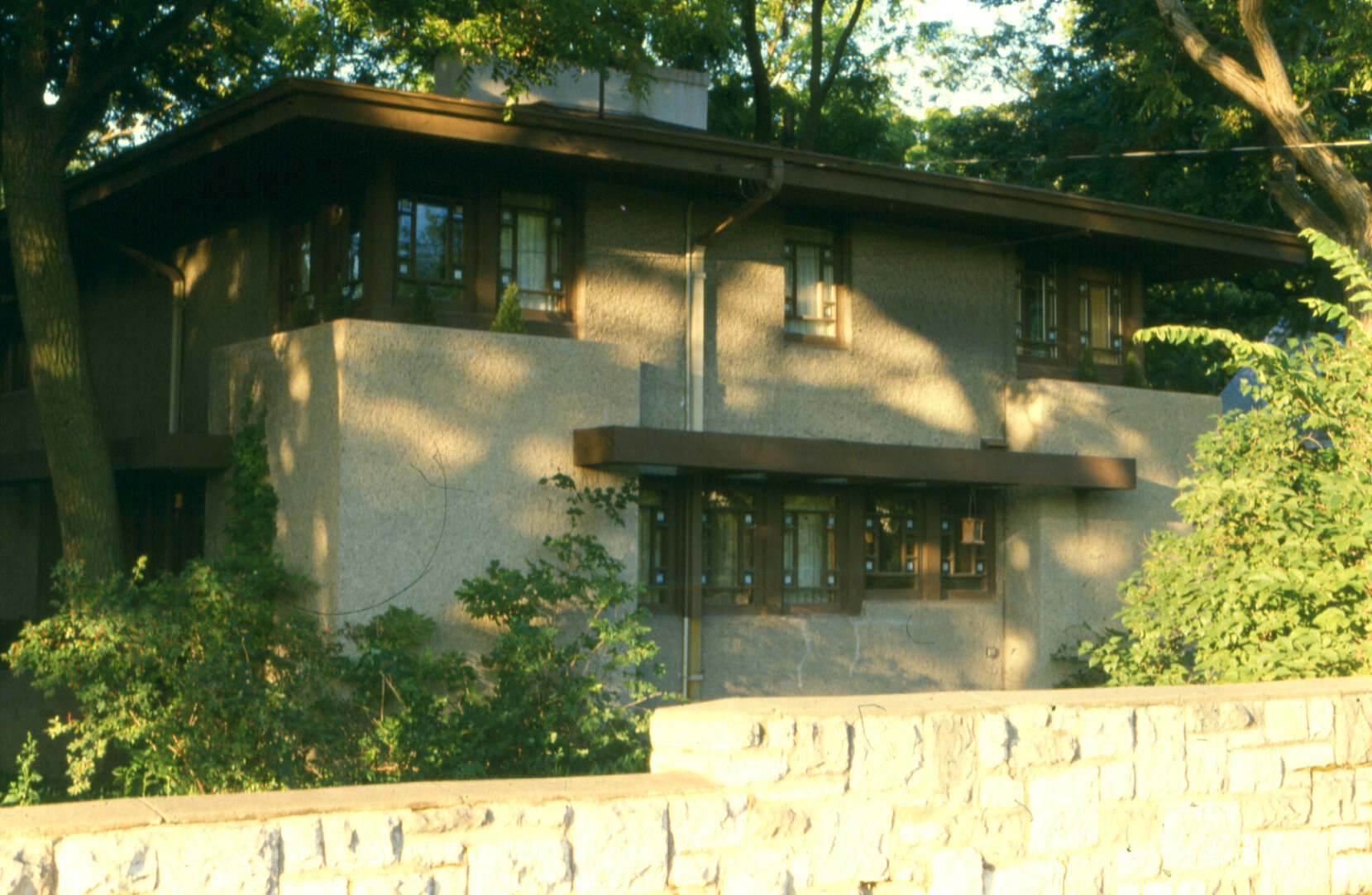
Blythe-Rule House, 1913

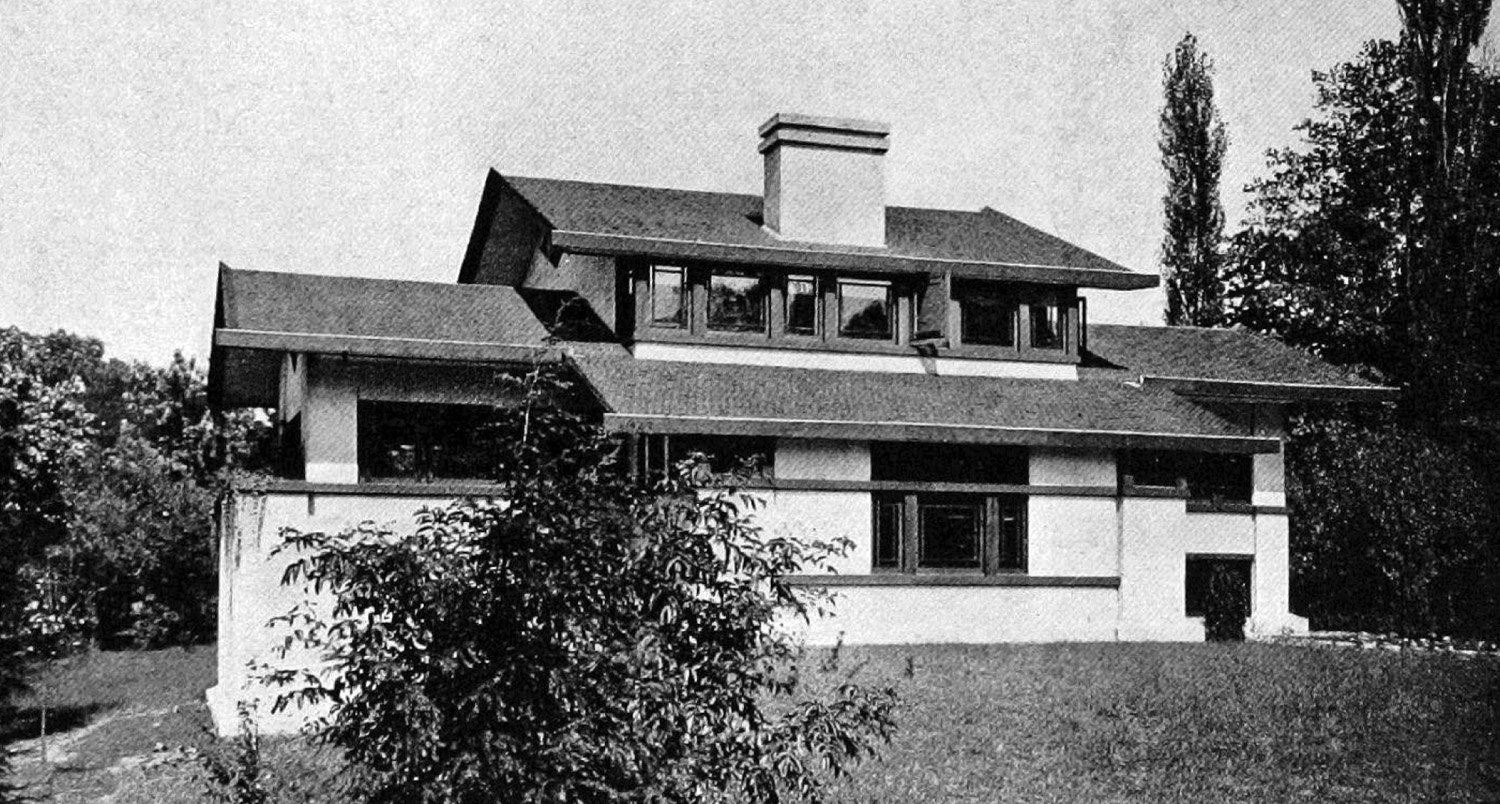
Ralph Griffin House, 1913

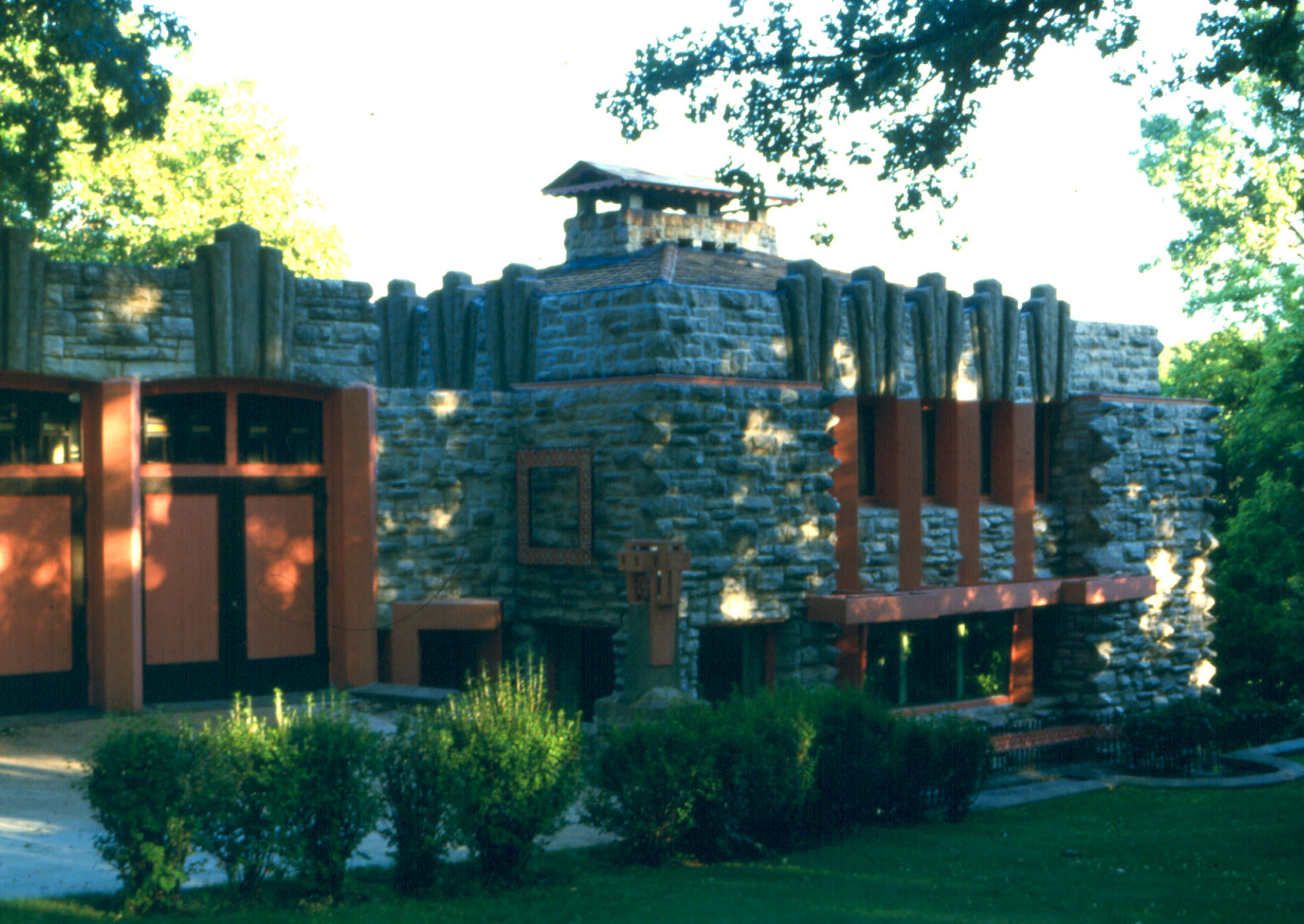
Melson House, 1914

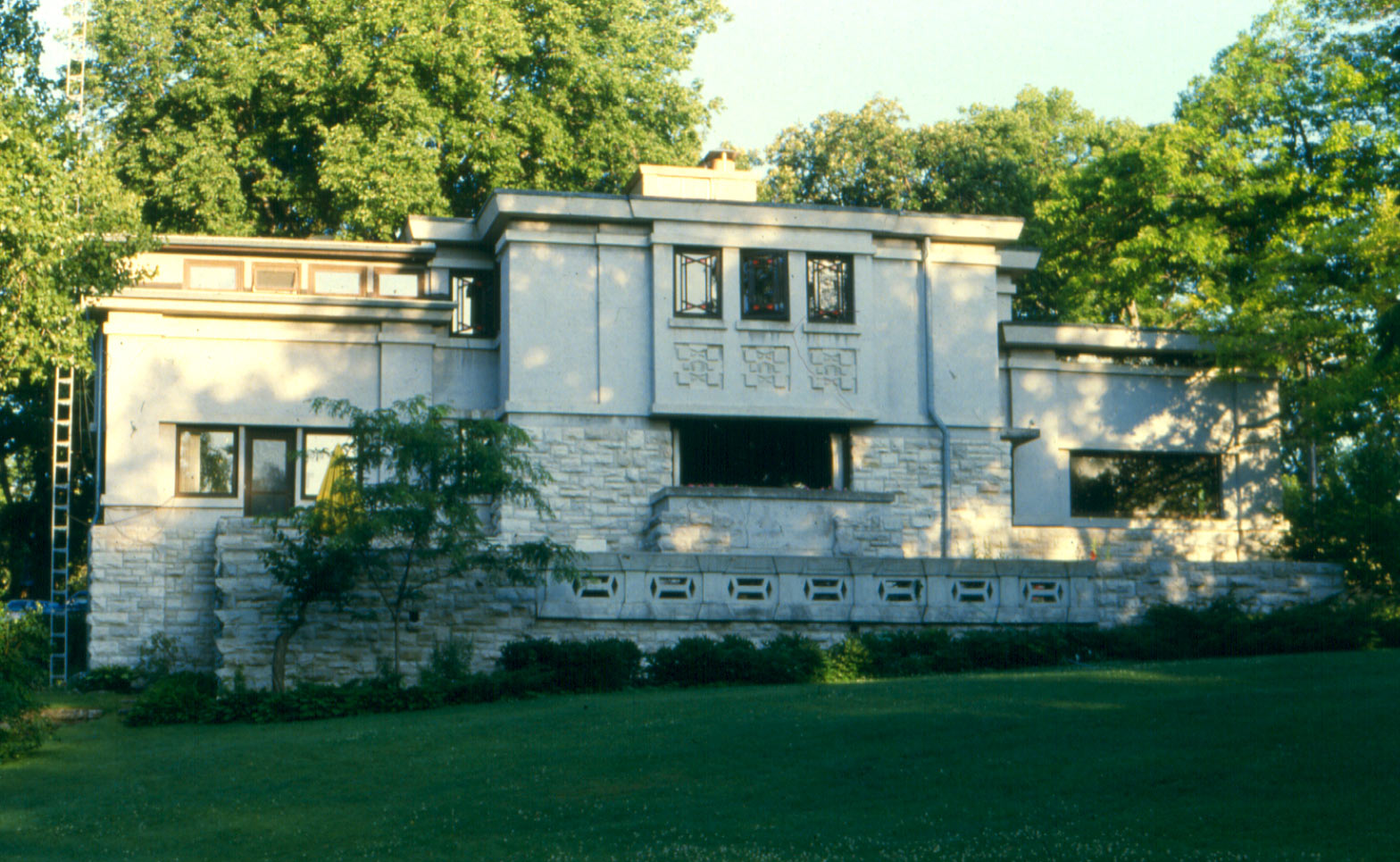
Blythe House, 1914

== Canberra ==
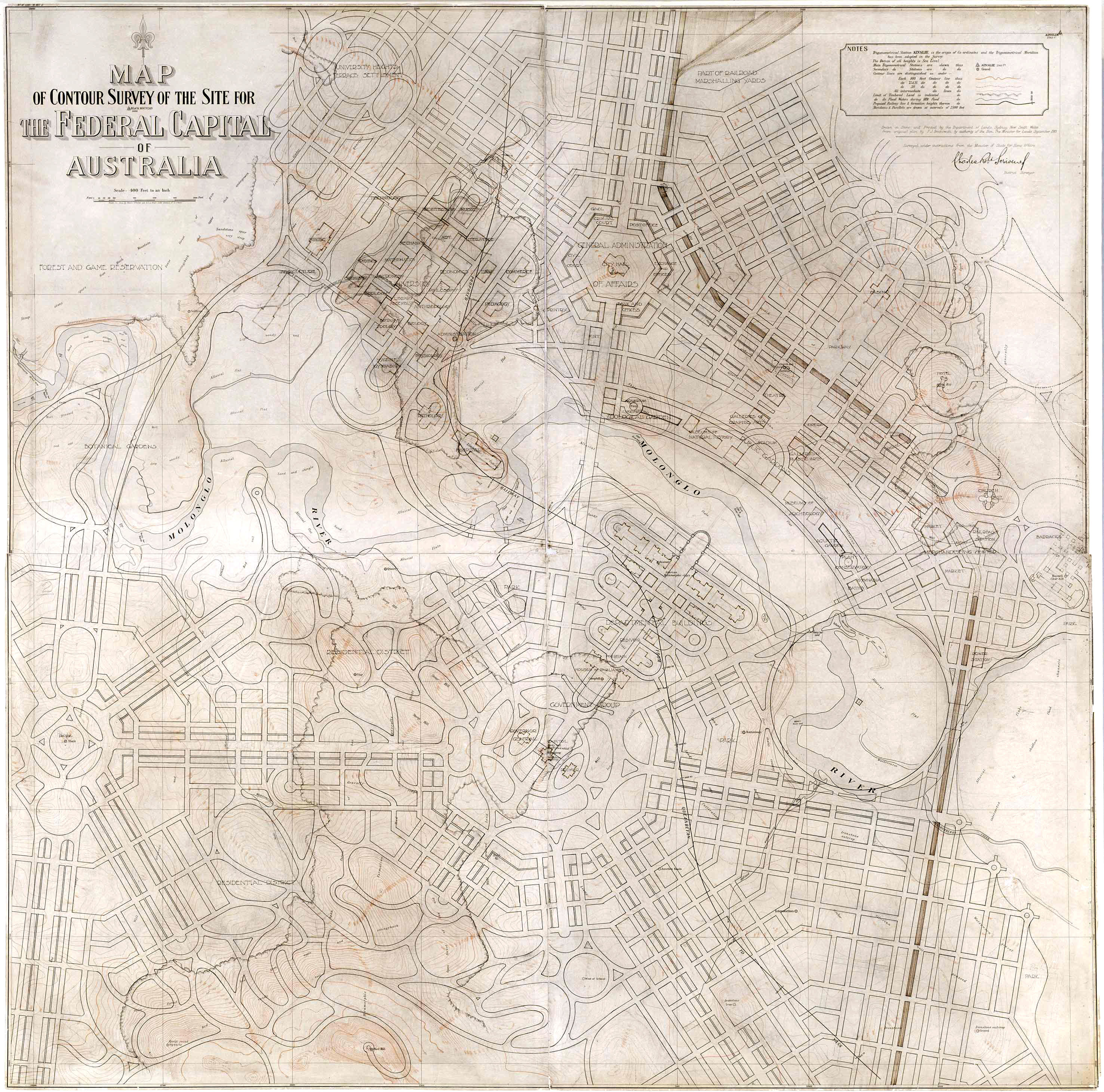
Griffin's contour survey for Canberra

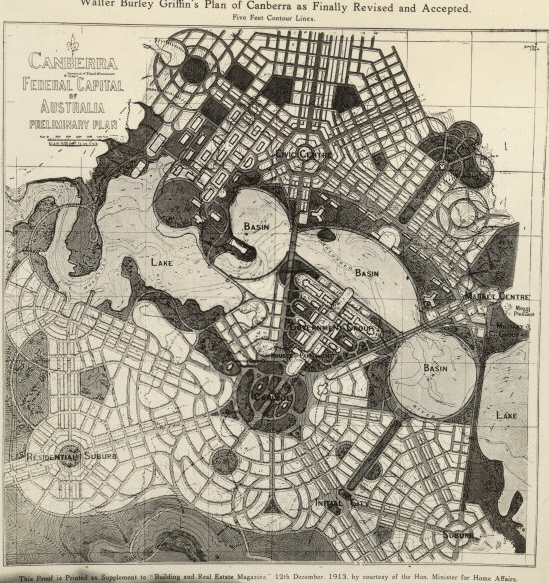
Final accepted plan for Canberra

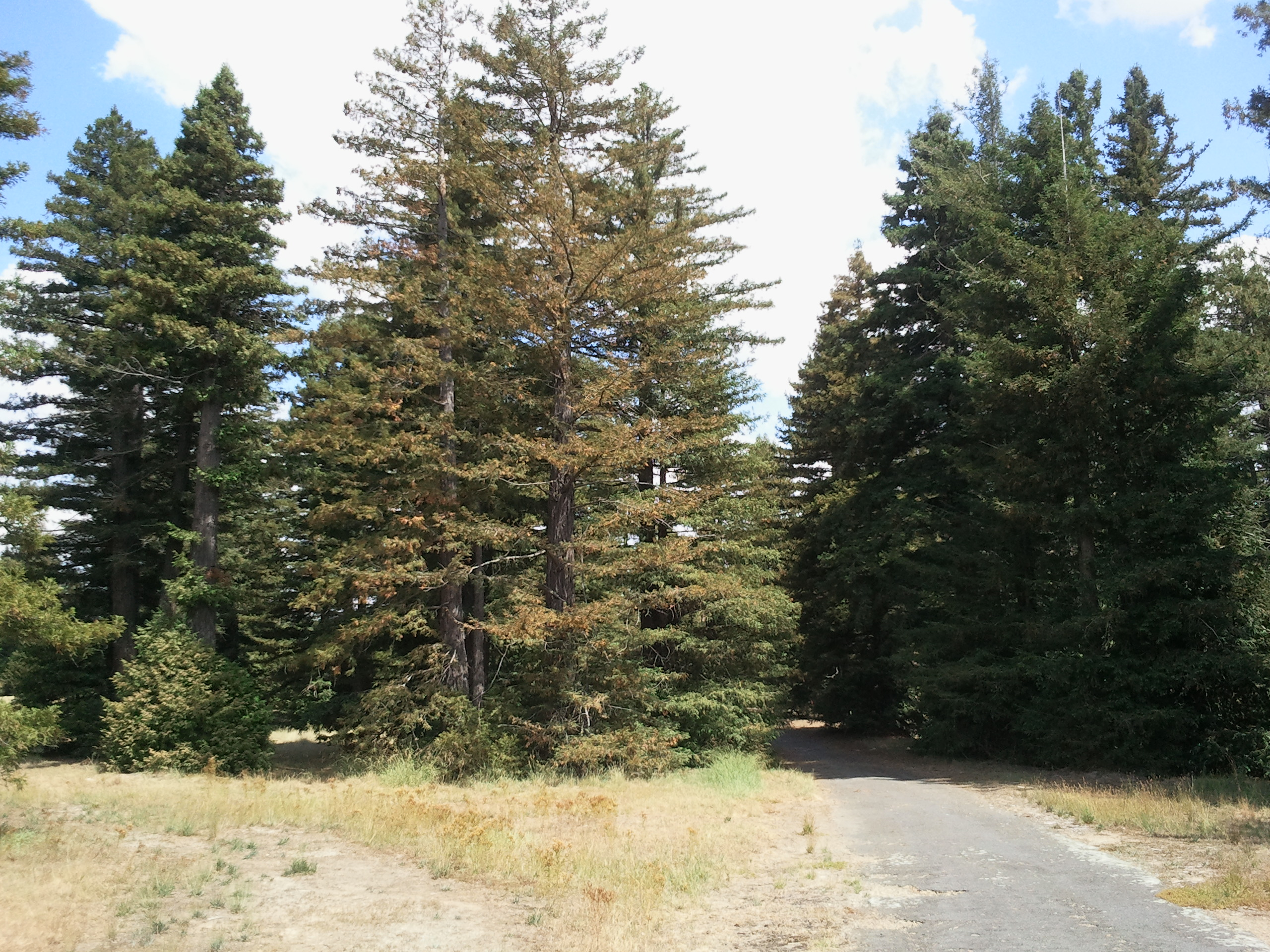
Forest of Redwood (Sequoia sempervirens and Sequoiadendron giganteum), planted in 1918, Pialligo Avenue, Canberra.

In April 1911, the Australian Commonwealth Government held an international competition to produce a design for its new, as yet unnamed, federal capital city. Griffin produced a design with impressive renderings of the plan by his new wife. They first heard about the competition in July, while on honeymoon, and worked feverishly to prepare the plans. On May 23, 1912, Griffin's design was selected as the winner from among 137 entries. This created significant press coverage at the time and brought him professional and public recognition. Of his plan, he famously remarked:

I have planned a city that is not like any other in the world. I have planned it not in a way that I expected any government authorities in the world would accept. I have planned an ideal city – a city that meets my ideal of the city of the future.

In 1913, Griffin was invited by the Commonwealth Government to Australia to inspect the site that was to become Canberra. He left Mahony Griffin in charge of the practice and travelled to Australia in July. His letters reveal his appreciation for the Australian landscape. The Griffins joined the Naturalists Society of New South Wales in 1914, where they enjoyed organized bush walks and field studies. The society facilitated their contact with the Australian scientific community, especially botanists. This appreciation for Australian flora was reflected in Griffin's 1914 town plan for the town of Leeton in the Murrumbidgee Irrigation Area of New South Wales, and later in a design for Newman College at the University of Melbourne. He also used Australian flora botanical names as places names for suburbs and streets in Canberra, such as Grevillea Park, Telopea Park, Clienthus Circle and Blandfordia.

Griffin was offered the position of head of the department of architecture at the University of Illinois. At the same time he was negotiating a three-year contract with the Commonwealth Government to remain in Australia and oversee the implementation of his plan, which he felt had already been compromised. In October 1913, he was appointed the Federal Capital Director of Design and Construction. In this role, Griffin oversaw the design of North and South Canberra, though he struggled with considerable political and bureaucratic obstacles. In May 1914, he and his wife left America for Australia along with architects Roy Lippincott and George Elgh.

With the outbreak of World War I in 1914, Griffin was under pressure to reduce the scope and scale of his plans due to the diversion of funds towards the war effort. Several parts of his basic design underwent change. Plans to create Westbourne, Southbourne and Eastbourne Avenues to complement Canberra's Northbourne Avenue were eliminated, as was a proposed railway connecting South Canberra to North Canberra, and on to Yass, 35 mi (55 km) away. A market area that would have been at Russell Hill in North Canberra was moved south to Fyshwick, next to South Canberra.

The pace of building was slower than expected, partly because of a lack of funds and partly because of continued disputation between Griffin and Commonwealth Government bureaucrats. Many of Griffin's design ideas were attacked by both the architectural profession and the press. In 1917, a Royal Commission determined that they had undermined Griffin's authority by supplying him with false data which he had used to carry out his work. Ultimately, Griffin resigned from the Canberra design project in December 1920 when he discovered that several of these bureaucrats had been appointed to an agency that would oversee Canberra's construction. The Commonwealth Government under the leadership of Prime Minister Hughes had removed Griffin as Director of Design and Construction after disagreements over his supervisory role, and in 1921 it created the Federal Capital Advisory Committee, with John Sulman as chair. Griffin was offered membership, but declined and withdrew from further activity in Canberra.

Griffin designed several buildings for Canberra, none of which was built. The grave of General Bridges on Mount Pleasant was the only permanent structure designed by him to be built in Canberra.

Aside from the city's design, Griffin's longest-living legacy is the plantation of Redwood trees (Sequoia sempervirens and Sequoiadendron giganteum) known as Pialligo Redwood Forest, that he and arborist Thomas Charles Weston planted in 1918. It is on Pialligo Avenue between Canberra and Queanbeyan, 1.8 mi (2.8 km) east of Canberra airport.

== Later career ==
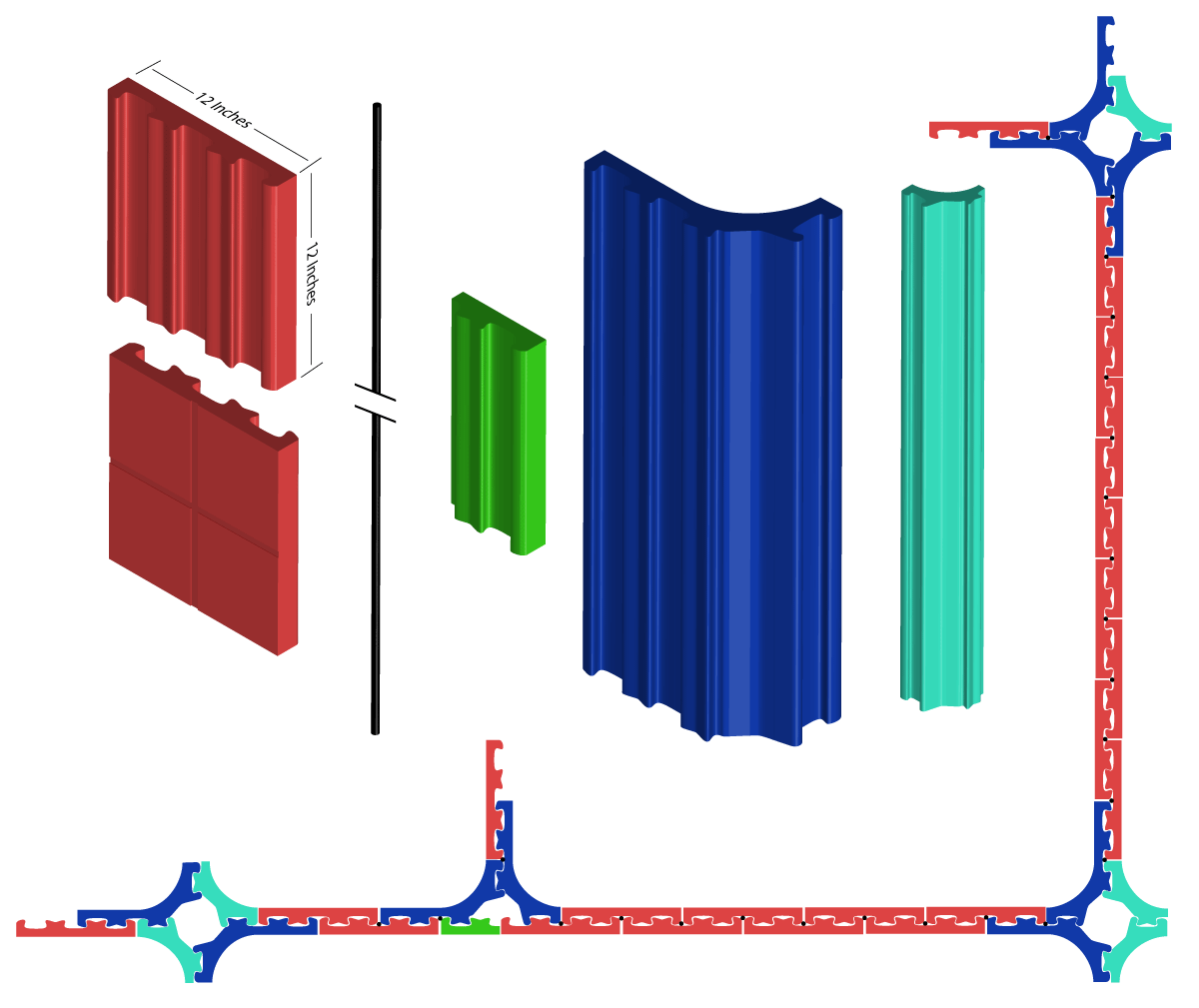
The Knitlock construction system designed by Griffin.

The Griffins' office in Chicago closed in 1917; however, they had successful practices in Melbourne and Sydney, which were a strong motivation for their continuing to live in Australia. The Griffins had received commissions for work outside Canberra since Walter first arrived in the country in 1913, designing town plans, subdivisions, and one of his highly regarded buildings, Newman College, the Catholic residential college of the University of Melbourne while employed in Canberra. While supervising activities in Canberra, Griffin spent much time in Melbourne and, in 1918, became a founder, with Royden Powell, of the Henry George Club, an organization devoted to providing a home for the Single Tax movement. The Griffins' first major commission after leaving Canberra was the Capitol Theatre in Melbourne; it opened on November 7, 1924. In 1964 architectural writer Robin Boyd described the Capitol as "the best cinema that was ever built or is ever likely to be built".

In 1916 and 1917, Griffin developed a patented modular concrete construction system known as "Knitlock" for use in the construction of Canberra. No Knitlock buildings were ever built in Canberra, although several were built in Australia. The first were built on Griffin's property in Frankston in 1922, where he constructed two holiday houses called "Gumnuts". The best examples of Knitlock include the S.R. Salter House in Toorak and the Paling House. Frank Lloyd Wright designed a similar system and used Griffin's design to support the arguments for his design.

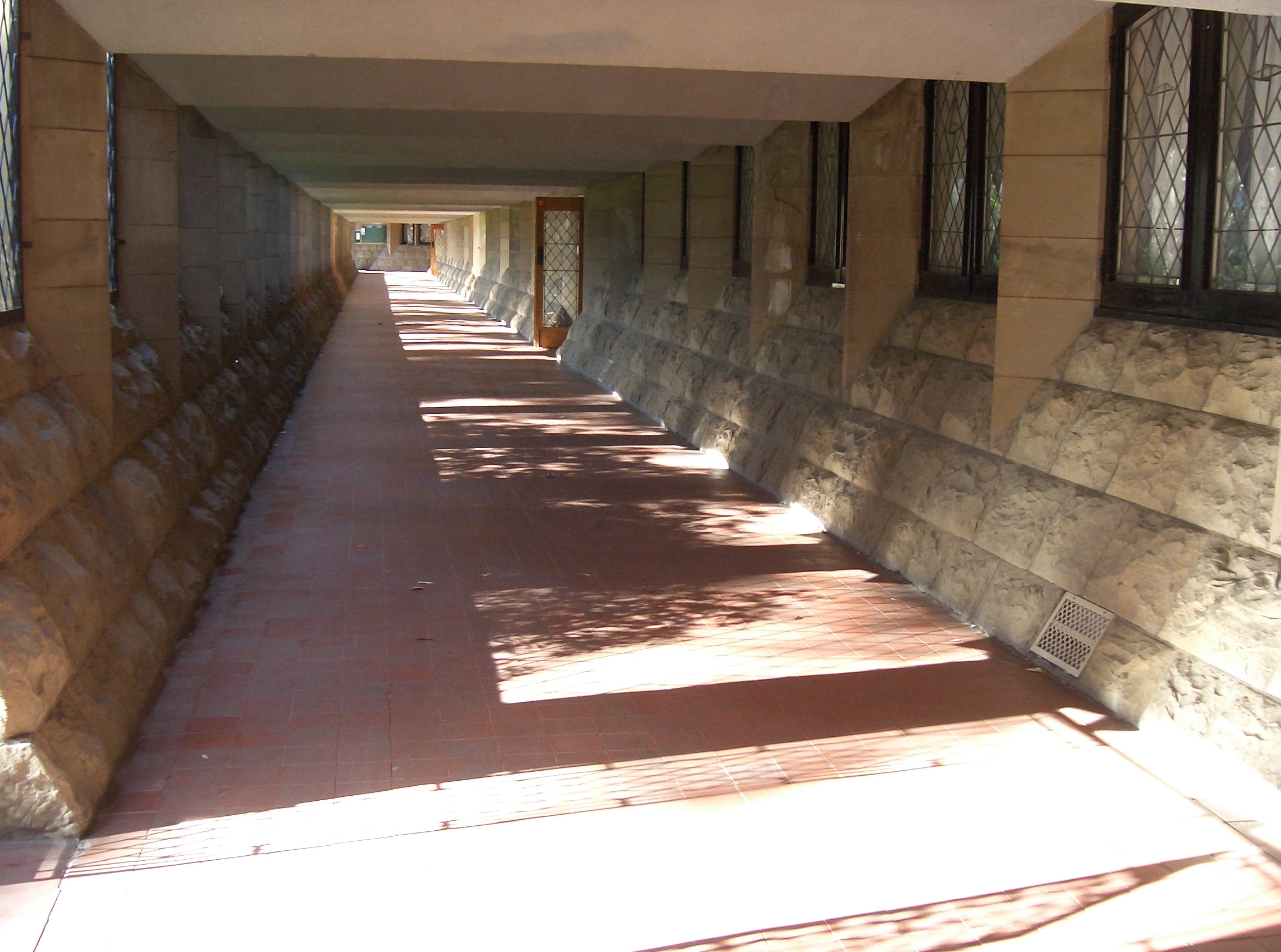
Mannix Wing walkway at Newman College, University of Melbourne

In 1919, the Griffins founded the Greater Sydney Development Association (GSDA), and in 1921 purchased 259 ha of land in North Sydney. The GSDA's goal was the development of an idyllic community with a consistent architectural feel and bushland setting. Walter Burley Griffin as managing director of the GSDA designed all the buildings built in the area until 1935. Castlecrag was the first suburb to be developed by the GSDA. The Redding House and several others in Castelcrag were also built in Knitlock. Almost all the houses Griffin designed in Castlecrag were small and had flat roofs, and he included an internal courtyard in many of them. Griffin used what was at that time the novel concept of including native bushland in these designs. He came to be referred to as "The Wizard of Castlecrag".

Other work the Griffins did during this time included the Melbourne subdivisions of Glenard (where the Griffins built their own Knitlock house "Pholiota") and Mount Eagle at Eaglemont, and the Ranelagh Estate in Mount Eliza Victoria 1924. The Ranelagh Estate was listed on the Victorian State Heritage Register (H01605) in 2005 as a significant example of a country estate. Prior to 1920 the Griffins also designed the New South Wales towns of Leeton and Griffith. Griffin and architect J Burcham Clamp designed a large tomb built at Waverley Cemetery, Sydney, between 1914 and 1916 for James Stuart, which still stands as a good example of Griffin's sense of 'human-scale monumentality'.

The Griffins participated in the celebrated Chicago Tribune Tower Competition in 1922. Having won one international competition, as architects who were both well acquainted with Chicago and recognized as practical visionaries, they offered a solution that was positive, forward-looking and elegant. Indeed, their non-winning entry appears to have been about a decade ahead of its time, with emphatic verticality along the lines of the Art Deco or Art Moderne. It anticipated, and would have been a near neighbor of, Chicago's 333 North Michigan by Holabird & Roche (1928); with stylistic echos in John and Donald Parkinson's Bullocks Wilshire, in Los Angeles (1929), as well as Adah Robinson and Bruce Goff's Boston Avenue Methodist Church, Tulsa (1929).

In the 1920s, the Griffins prepared plans for the Milleara Estate (also known as City View) at Avondale Heights and the Ranelagh Estate at Mount Eliza, both in Victoria (Australia) in conjunction with surveyors Tuxen and Miller.

=== Incinerators ===
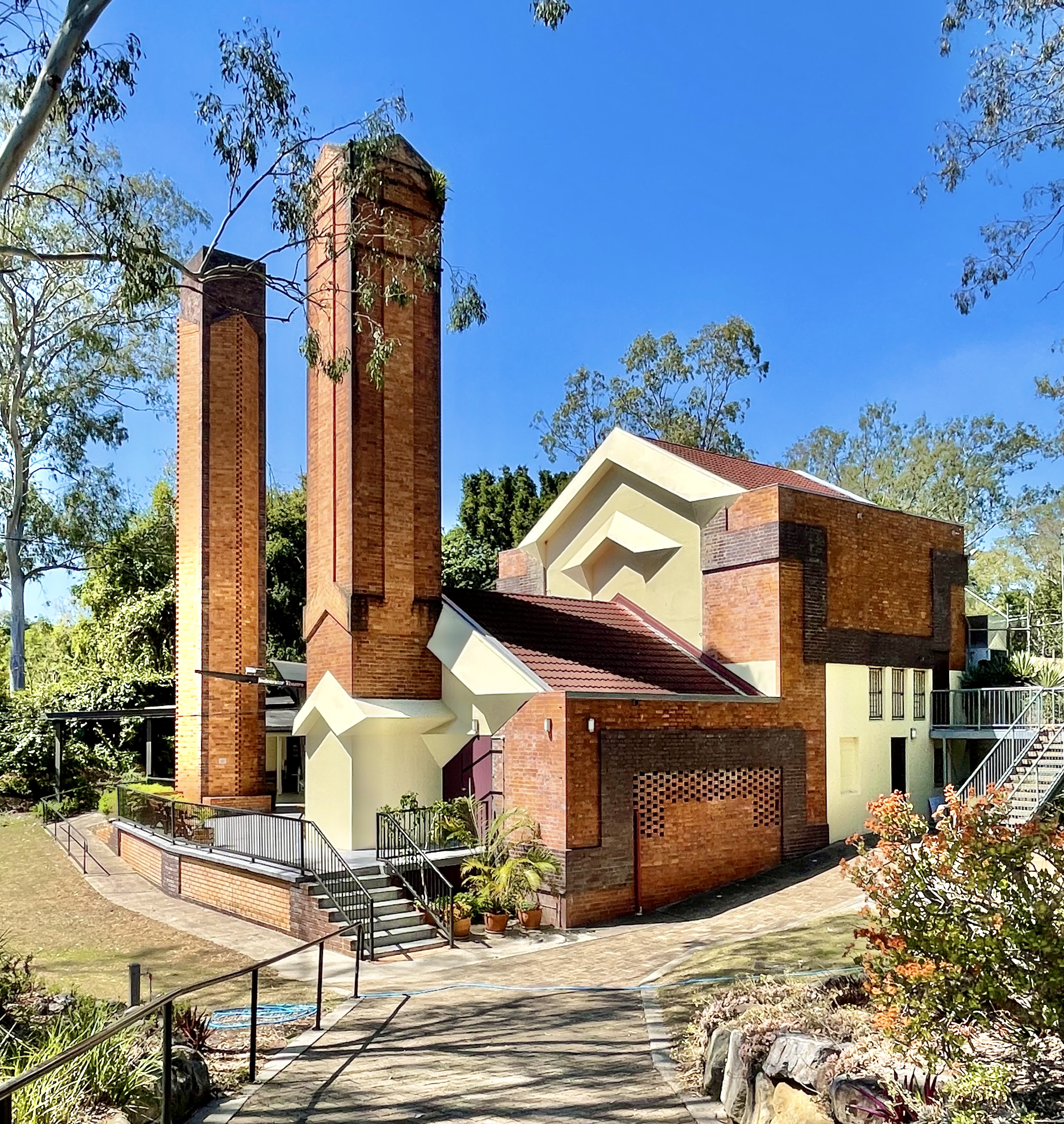
Walter Burley Griffin Incinerator, Ipswich, Queensland

During the financial hardship of the Great Depression, in the 1930s Griffin designed incinerators, collaborating with the Reverberatory Incinerator and Engineering Company (RIECo), in conjunction with his friend and business partner, Eric Nicholls. He was responsible for twelve incinerator designs between 1930 and 1938, of which seven still survive. They are located at:

- Willoughby, New South Wales
- Glebe, New South Wales
- Ipswich, Queensland
- Essendon, Victoria
- Hindmarsh, South Australia
- Thebarton, South Australia
- Canberra, Australian Capital Territory

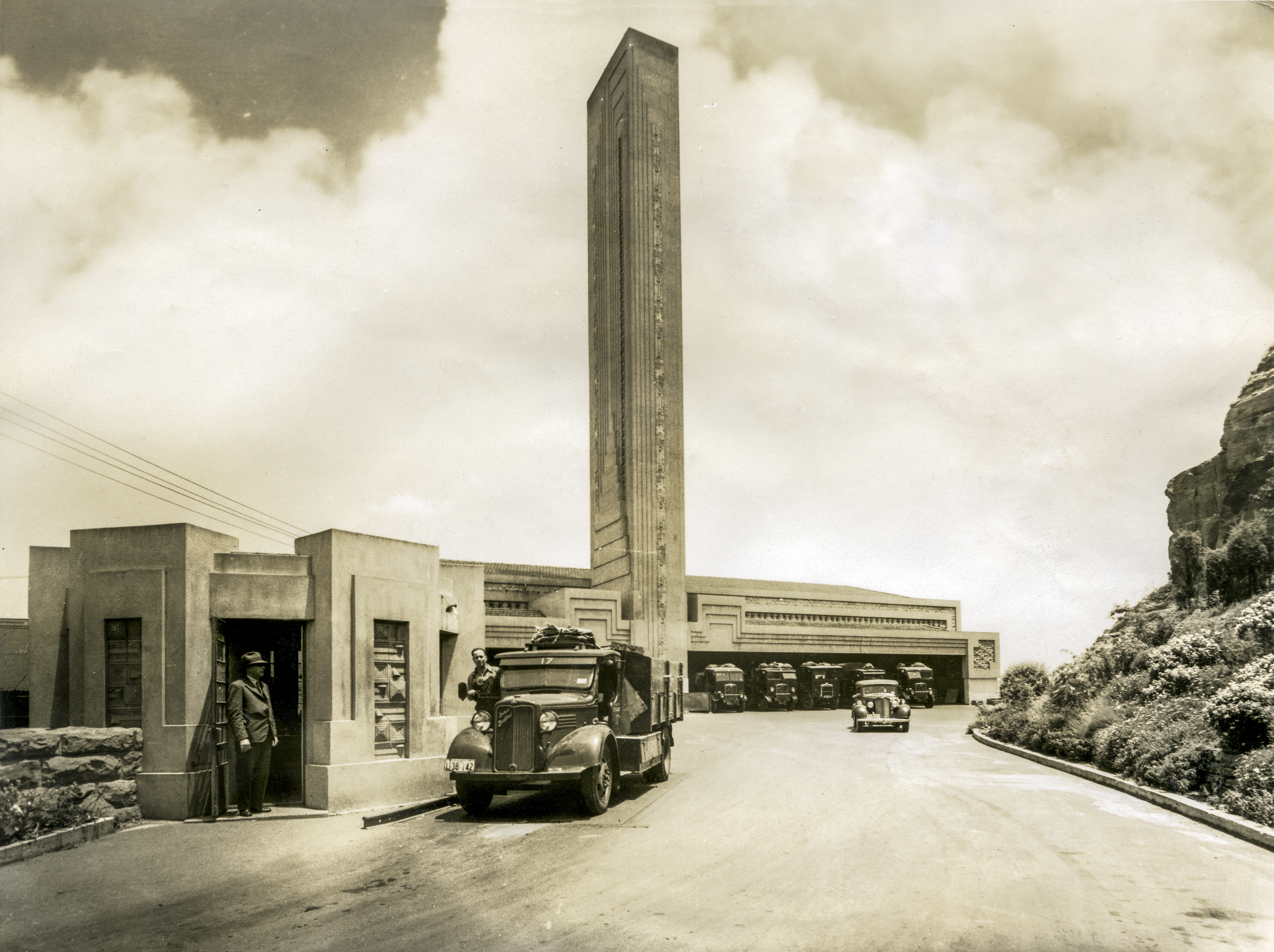
Large incinerator at Pyrmont, NSW, built for the City of Sydney in 1936.

The Willoughby incinerator is a good example of this work. It has been listed by the National Trust of Australia and the Royal Australian Institute of Architects as a building of significance. In 1999 it was listed in the New South Wales State Heritage Register. It has since been restored and converted to commercial use by Willoughby Council.

The Walter Burley Griffin Incinerator, Ipswich, Queensland is listed on the Queensland Heritage Register and has been converted into a theatre. Another incinerator was built in the suburb of Pyrmont, not far from the centre of Sydney. This incinerator was considered for heritage listing but was demolished in 1992 because it was in irredeemably bad condition.

== India ==
During their time at the GSDA, the Griffins became more involved in anthroposophy, and in 1935 through contacts in the movement Griffin won a commission to design the library at the University of Lucknow in Lucknow, India.

Although he had planned to stay in India only to complete the drawings for the library, he soon received more than 40 commissions, including the University of Lucknow Student Union building; a museum and library for the Raja of Mahmudabad; a zenana (women's quarters) for the Raja of Jahangirabad; Pioneer Press building, a bank, municipal offices, many private houses, and a memorial to King George V. He also won complete design responsibility for the 1936–1937 United Provinces Exhibition of Industry and Agriculture. His 53 projects for the 160-acre (0.65 km^{2}) site featured a stadium, arena, mosque, imambara, art gallery, restaurant, bazaar, pavilions, rotundas, arcades, and towers, however, only part of his elaborate plans were fully executed.

Griffin was inspired by the architecture and culture of India, modifying forms as "he sought to create a modern Indian architecture ... Griffin was able to expand his aesthetic vocabulary to create an exuberant, expressive architecture reflecting both the 'stamp of the place' and the 'spirit of the times'". While in India, Griffin also published numerous articles for the Pioneer, writing about architecture, in particular about ventilation design improvements. Marion joined Walter in Lucknow in April 1936 to collaborate on several projects.

=== Death and burial in India ===
Griffin died of peritonitis in early 1937, five days after gall bladder surgery at King George's Hospital, Lucknow, in Lucknow, Uttar Pradesh, India, and was buried in Christian Cemetery in Lucknow. Marion Mahony Griffin oversaw the completion of the Pioneer Building that he had been working on at the time of his death. She closed down their Indian offices before leaving their Australian practice in the hands of Griffin's partner, Eric Milton Nicholls, and returned to Chicago.

== Legacy ==
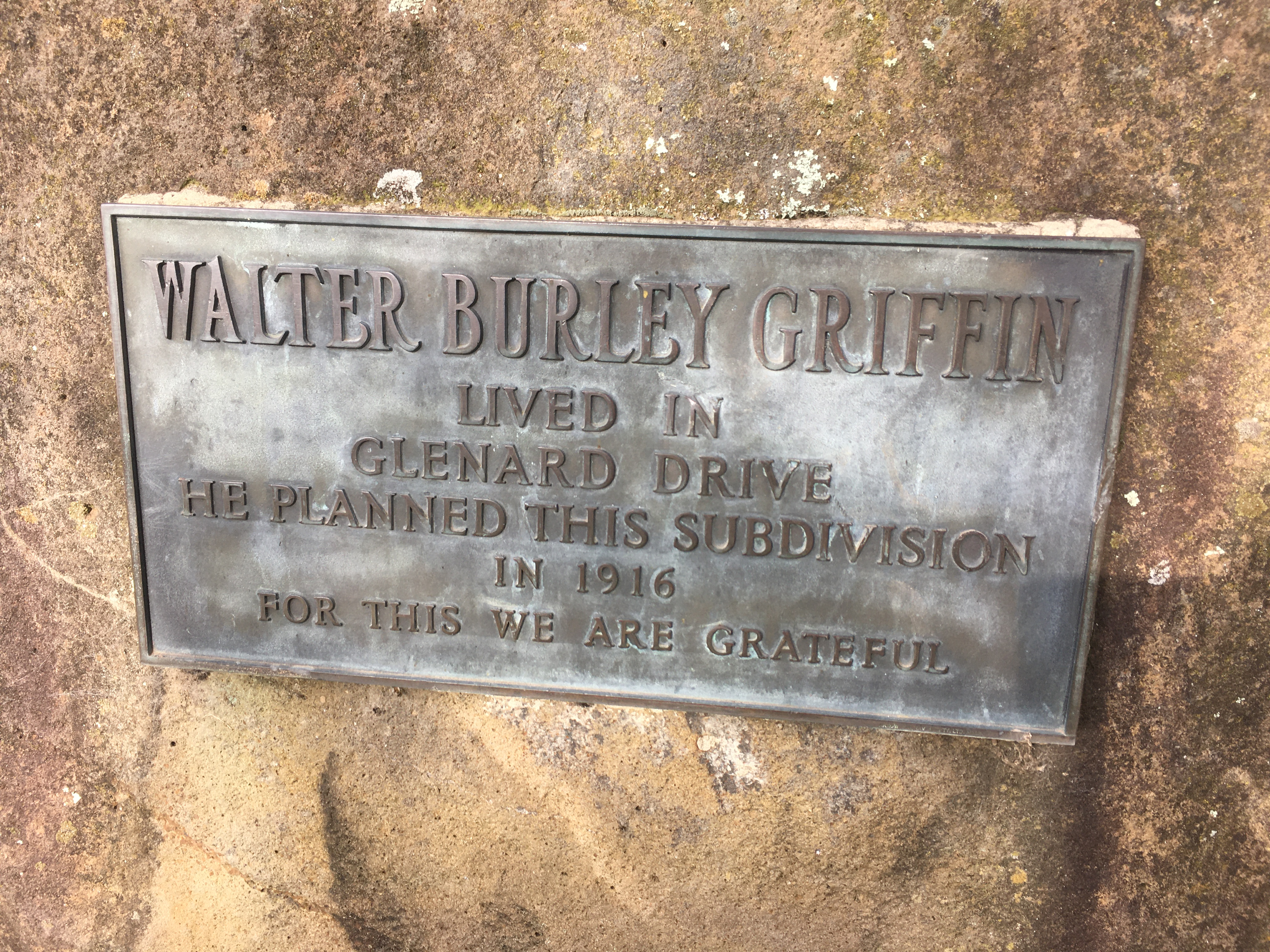
Memorial plaque to Walter Burley Griffin memorial in Ivanhoe East, Melbourne.

Griffin was largely under-appreciated during his time in Australia, but, since his death, recognition of his work has steadily grown. In 1964, when Canberra's central lake was filled, as Griffin had intended, Prime Minister Robert Menzies declined to have the lake named after himself. Instead he named it Lake Burley Griffin, making it the first "monument" in Canberra dedicated to the city's designer ("Burley" was included in the name because of the ongoing misconception that it was part of Griffin's surname). Burley Griffin Way is a 276 km road linking Griffith, Temora, Harden, and Binalong to the Hume highway west of Bowning, 10 km northwest of Yass.

Architectural drawings and other archival materials by and about the Griffins are held by numerous institutions in the United States, including the Drawings and Archives Department of Avery Architectural and Fine Arts Library at Columbia University; the Block Gallery at Northwestern University; the Ryerson & Burnham Libraries at the Art Institute of Chicago; and the New York Historical Society, as well as in several repositories in Australia, including the National Library of Australia, National Archives of Australia, and the Newman College Archives of the University of Melbourne. At the centenary of the Griffins' design work for Canberra, some believe they are owed a permanent memorial.

=== Recognition ===
In 1988 the Royal Australian Institute of Architects named its national Civic Design Award after Griffin. It is now known as the Walter Burley Griffin Award for Urban Design and is awarded annually.

== In his own words ==
"I am what may be termed a naturalist in architecture. I do not believe in any school of architecture. I believe in architecture that is the logical outgrowth of the environment in which the building in mind is to be located". From The New York Times, Sunday June 2, 1912

== Major works ==
=== India ===
- Library in University of Lucknow, in Lucknow city in the state of Uttar Pradesh in India
- Dr Bhatia's Residence, still extant in Lucknow city in the state of Uttar Pradesh in India

=== United States ===
- G.B. Cooley House, 1908 South Grand St., Monroe, Louisiana
- Alfred W. Hebert House Remodeling, 1902, Evanston, Illinois
- W.H. Emery House, 1903, Elmhurst, Illinois
- Adolph Mueller House, 1906
- John Dickinson House (part of the Eden Rift Estate Winery), 10034 Cienega Road Hollister, California 1906
- Mary H. Bovee Apartment, 1907
- John Gauler House, 5917–5921 N. Magnolia Ave., Chicago, Illinois, 1908
- William S. Orth House, 1908, Winnetka, Illinois
- Edmund C. Garrity House, 1909
- Ralph Griffin House, 1909, Edwardsville, Illinois
- Edmund C. Garrity House, 1712 W. 104th Place, Chicago, Illinois, 1909
- William B. Sloan House, 1910
- Frank N. Olmstead House, 1624 W. 100th Place, Chicago, Illinois, 1910
- Harry N. Tolles House, 10561 S. Longwood Drive, Chicago, Illinois, 1911
- Harry G. Van Nostrand House, 1666 W. 104th Place, Chicago, Illinois, 1911
- Russell L. Blount House I, 1724 W. 104th Place, Chicago, Illinois, 1911
- Benjamin J. and Mabel T. Ricker House, 1510 Broad Street, Grinnell, Iowa, 1911–1912
- Joshua Melson House, 1912, Mason City, Iowa
- Russel L. Blount House II, 1950 W. 102nd Street, Chicago, Illinois, 1912–1913
- Jenkinson House, 1727 W. 104th Place, Chicago, Illinois, 1912–1913
- Walter D. Salmon House, 1736 W. 104th Place, Chicago, Illinois, 1912–1913
- Newland House, 1737 W. 104th Place, Chicago, Illinois, 1913
- Ida E. Williams House, W. 104th Place, Chicago, Illinois (based on the Von Nostrand plans, built by Blount), 1913
- William R. Hornbaker House, 1710 W. 104th Place, Chicago, Illinois, (based on the Von Nostrand plans, built by Blount), 1914
- James Frederic Clarke House, 1731 W. 104th Place, Chicago, Illinois, (based on the Von Nostrand plans, built by Blount), 1913
- Harry C. Furneaux House, 1741 W. 104th Place, Chicago, Illinois, (based on the Salmon House plans, built by Blount), 1913
- James Blyth House, Mason City, Iowa
- Stinson Memorial Library, Anna, Illinois

=== Australia ===
- Canberra plan, 1914–1920
- Leeton town plan, 1914
- Griffith town plan, 1914
- Eaglemont town plan, 1915
- Paris Theatre, Sydney, 1915 (demolished 1981)
- Newman College, University of Melbourne, 1916–1918
- Café Australia, Melbourne, 1916
- North Arm Cove town plan, 1918
- Pholiota, in Eaglemont, Victoria 1920
- Capitol Theatre, Melbourne 1924
- Palais de danse, St Kilda 1925 (destroyed by fire)
- Leonard House, Elizabeth Street Melbourne 1925 (demolished)
- Ranelagh Estate, town plan, 1924
- Langi Flats, Toorak 1925–26
- Castlecrag, suburb plan, 1925
- Fishwick House, completed in 1929
- Lake Daylesford, completed 1929
- Castle Cove, suburb plan, 1930
- Willoughby Incinerator, completed 1932
- Duncan House (Castlecrag), completed 1934
- Eric Pratten House, in Pymble, Sydney, completed 1936
- Hindmarsh Incinerator, South Australia, completed 1936
- Pyrmont Incinerator, completed 1936 (demolished 1992)
- Thebarton Incinerator, South Australia, completed 1937
- Walter Burley Griffin Incinerator, Ipswich, completed 1992
- Glebe Incinerator, Blackwattle Bay, Sydney, built 1932

== Gallery ==
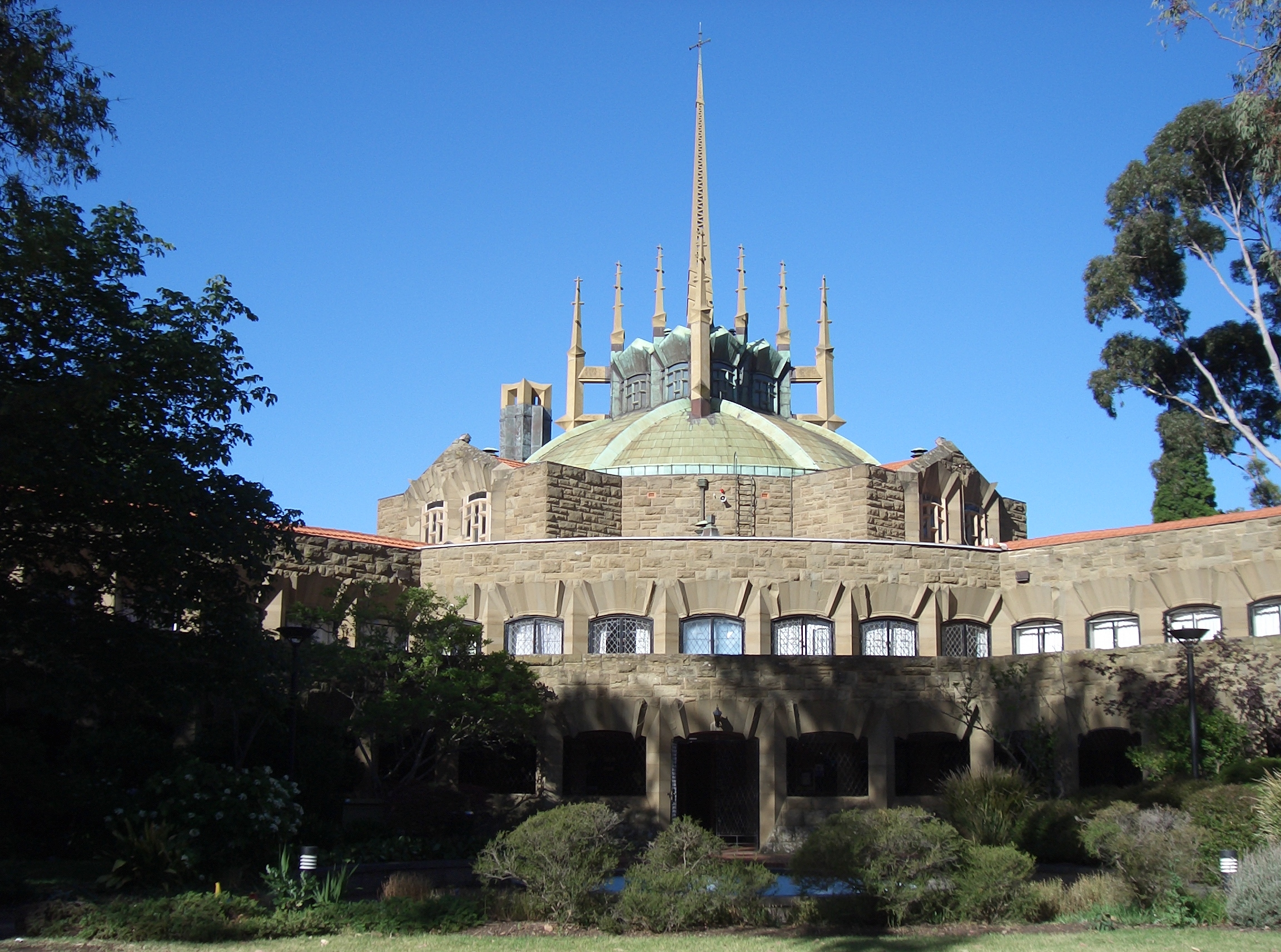
Newman College, Melbourne

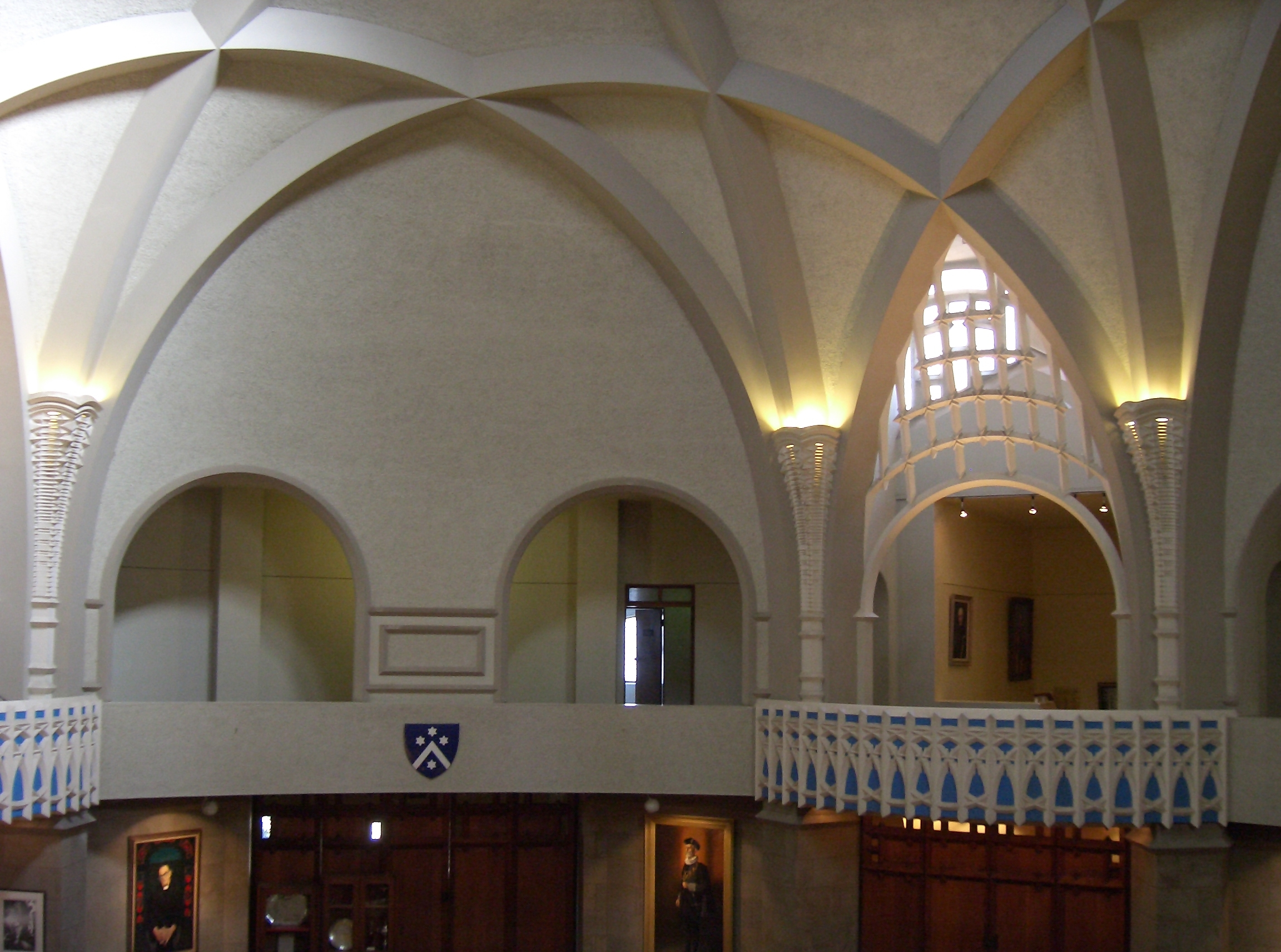
Newman College: interior of the dining room

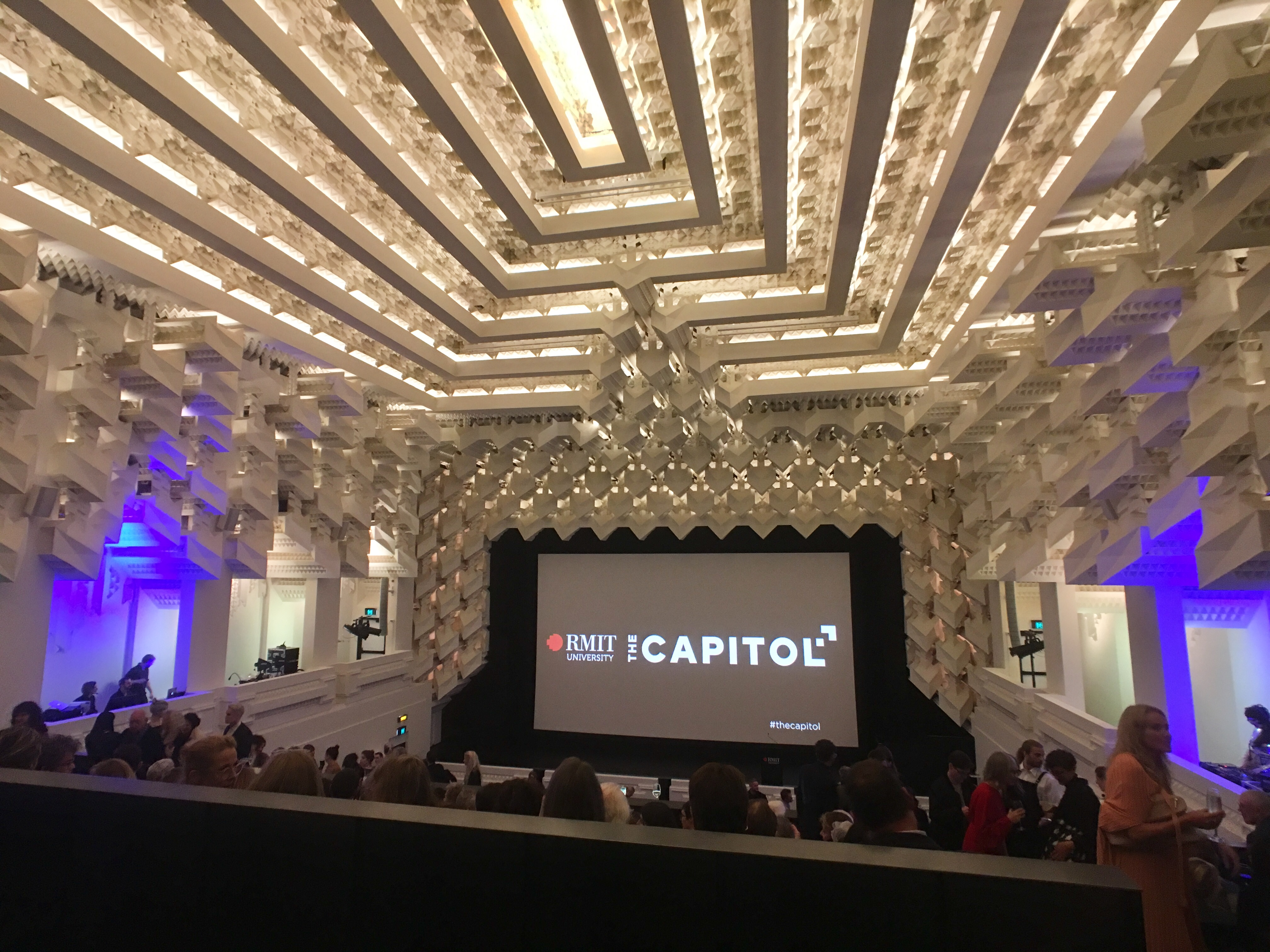
Capitol Theatre, Melbourne

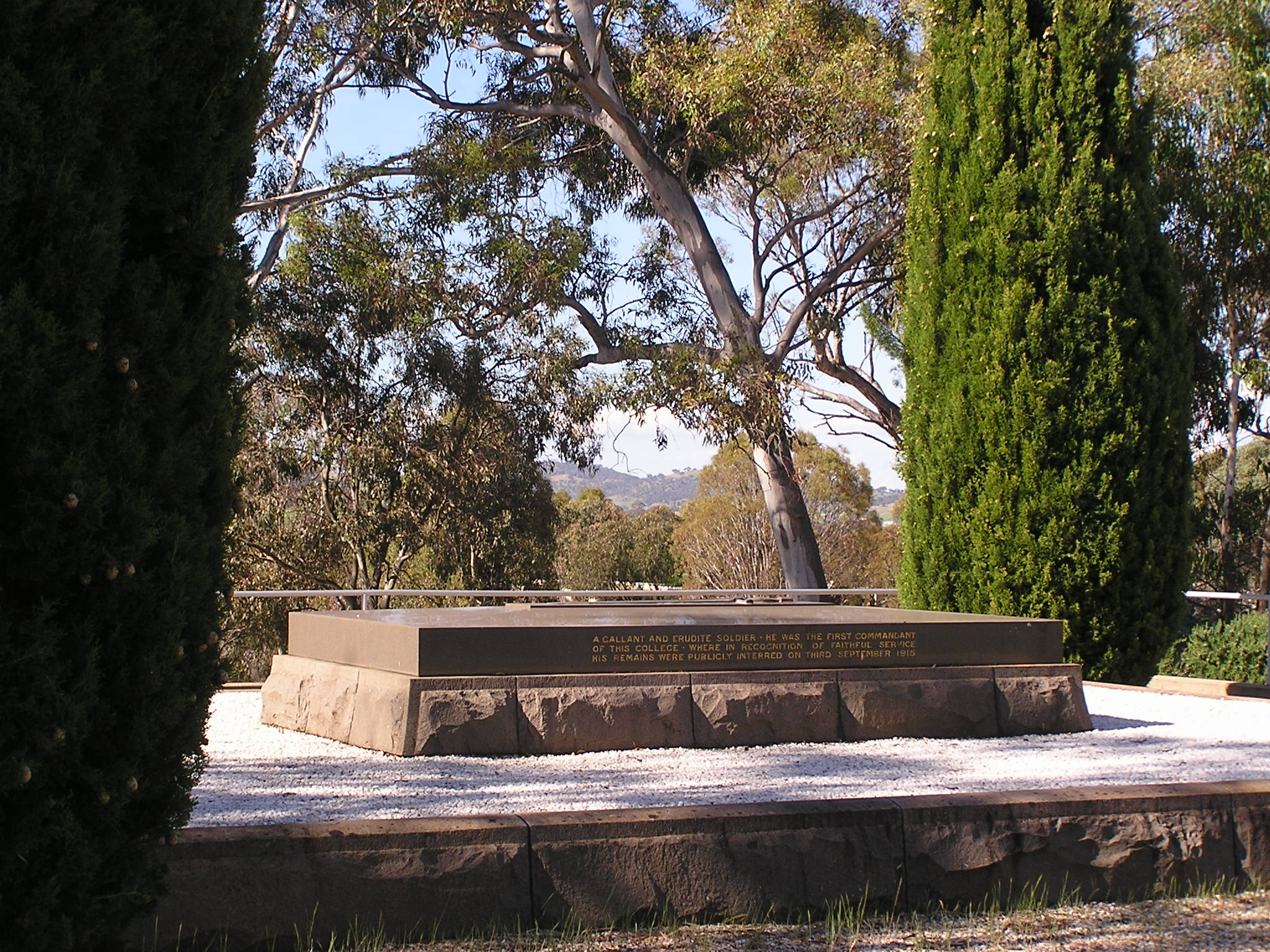
Grave of General Bridges in Canberra

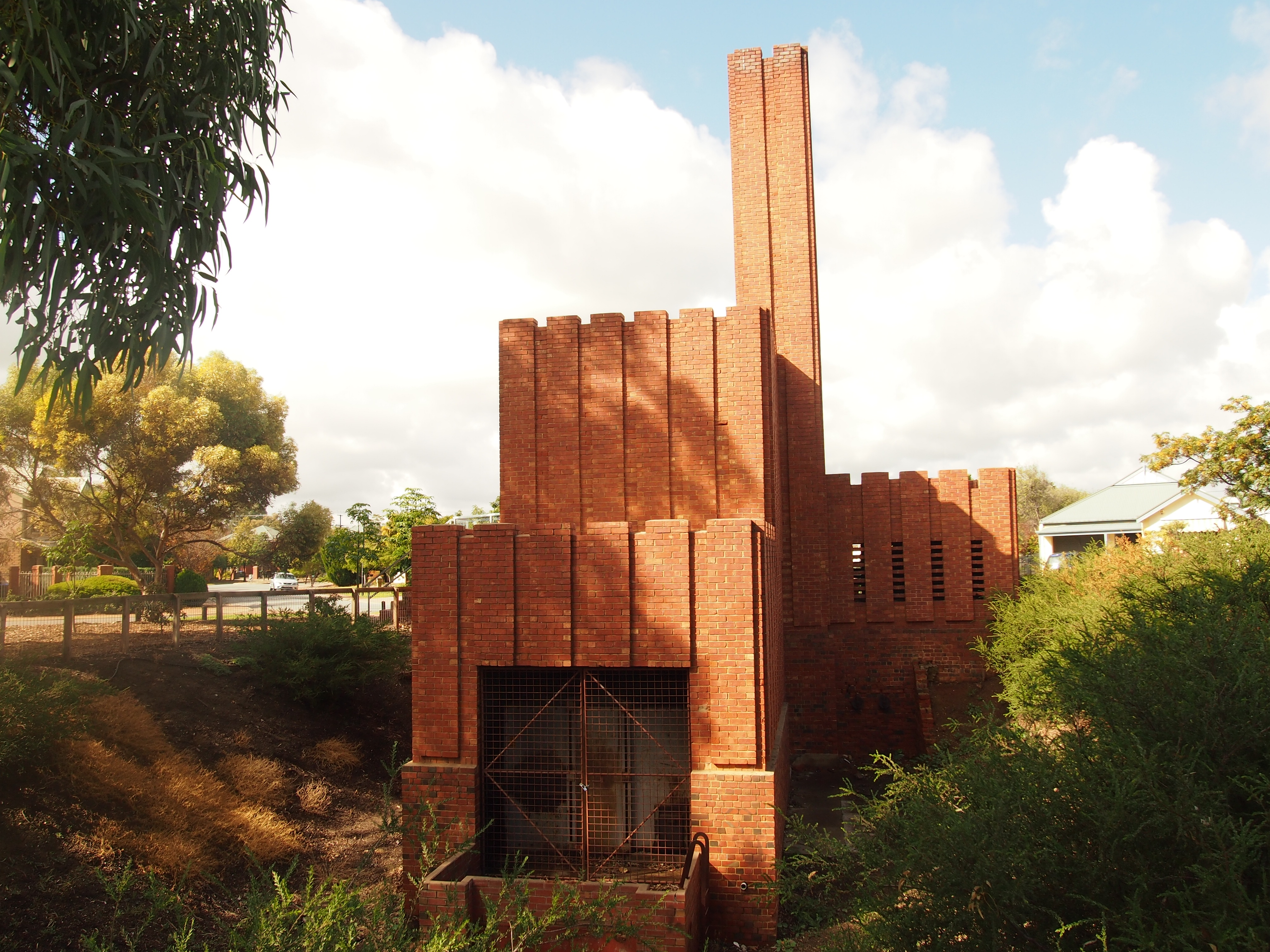
The incinerator in the suburb of Brompton, South Australia, known by the name of the adjacent suburb, Hindmarsh

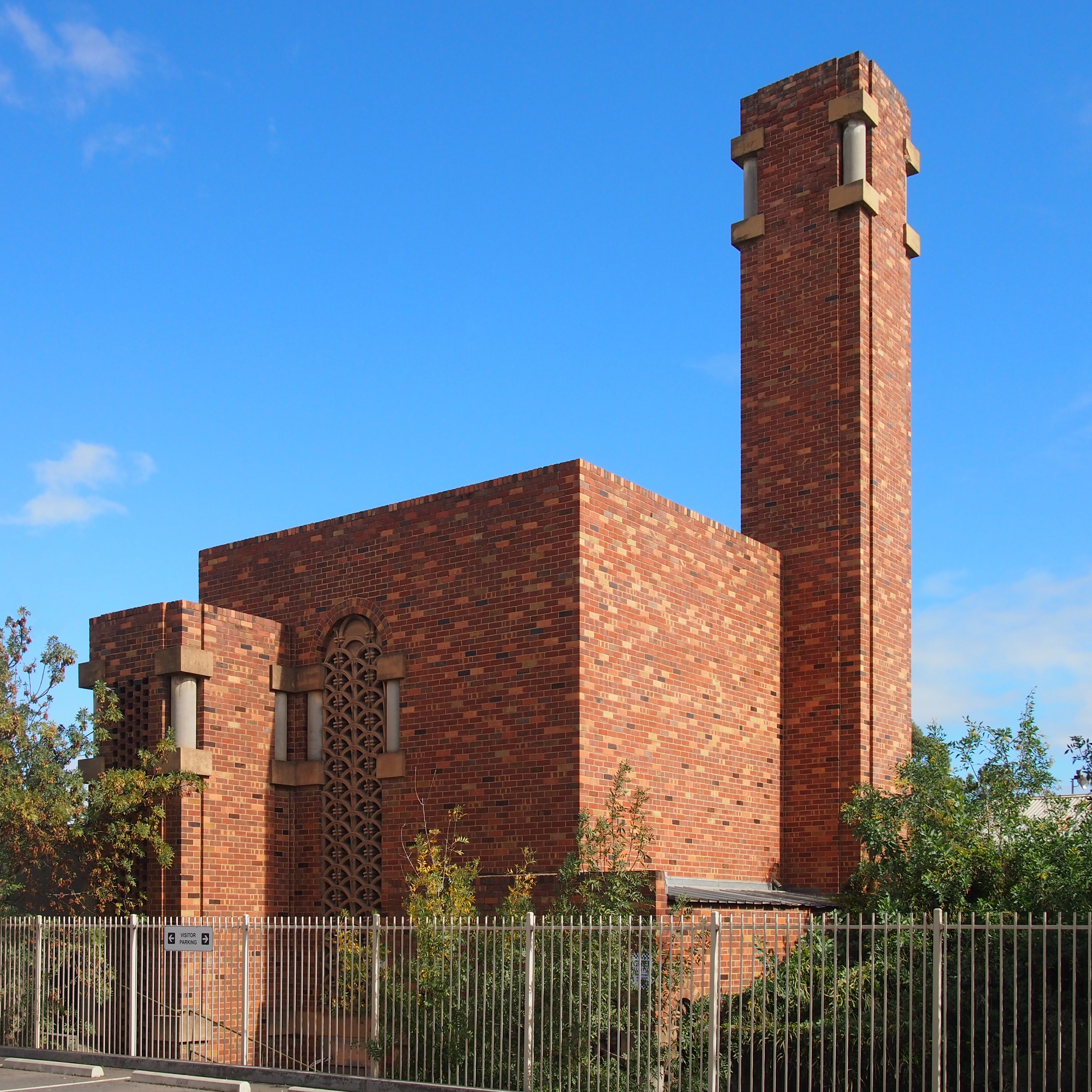
The incinerator in the suburb of Thebarton, South Australia

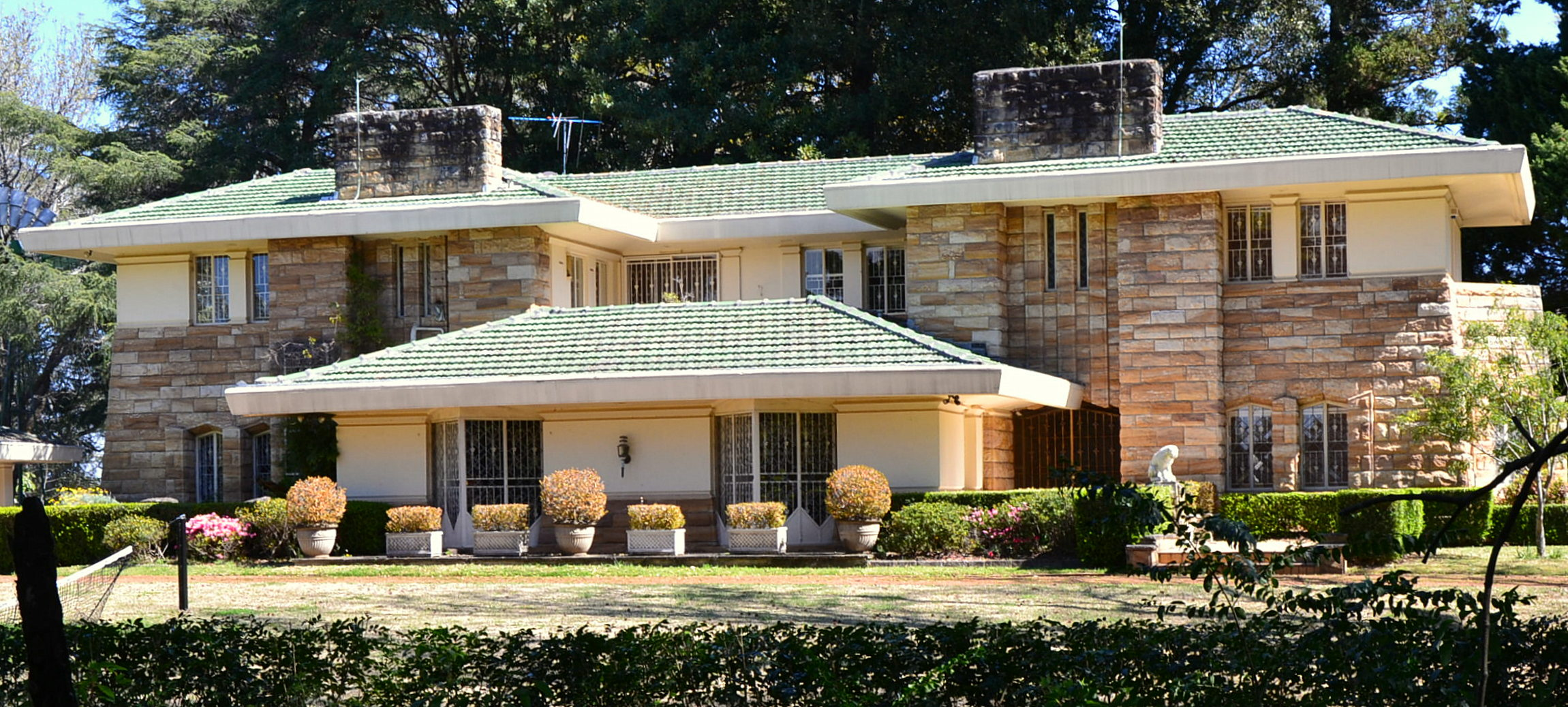
Eric Pratten House, also called Coppins, in Pymble, Sydney
