= B.J. Ricker House =

Historic house in Iowa, United States

- U.S. National Register of Historic Places
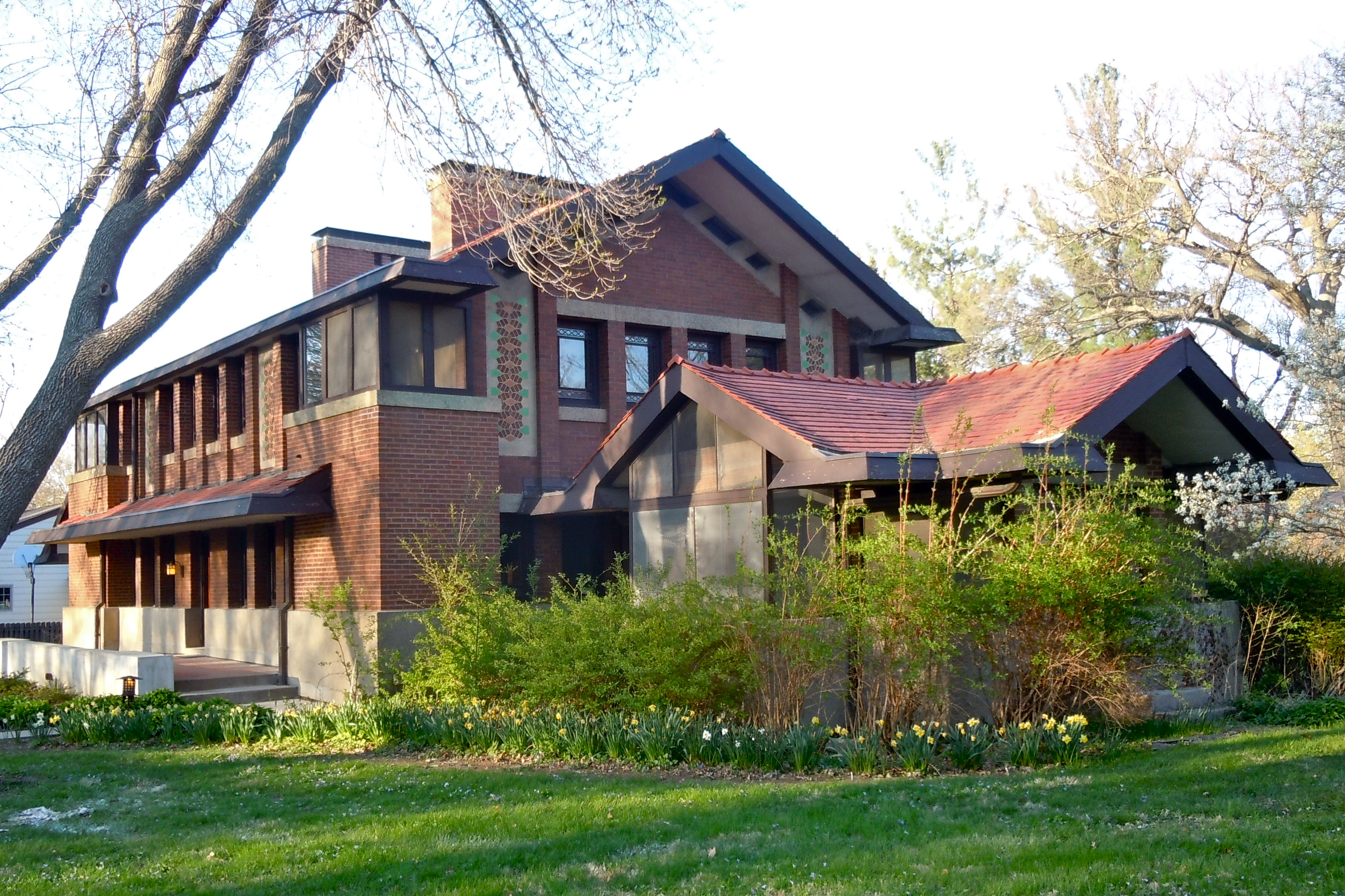

- Location within Iowa Location within the United States
- Location: 1510 Broad St. Grinnell, Iowa
- Coordinates: 41°45′08″N 92°43′25″W
- Area: less than one acre
- Built: 1911-1912
- Architect: Walter Burley Griffin
- Architectural style: Prairie School
- NRHP reference No.: 79000937
- Added to NRHP: December 25, 1979

The B.J. Ricker House is a historic dwelling located in Grinnell, Iowa, United States. The significance of this house is that it is an early example of Walter Burley Griffin's work. Construction on the house began in 1911, but millwork and labor problems pushed its completion to 1912. The two-story brick house features a rectangular plan, a high cement basement, four broad brick piers on the corners, and a gable roof that appears to hover over the main block. The veranda on the south side of the house follows a Greek cross plan. The house was listed on the National Register of Historic Places in 1979.
