= Melbourne Sports and Entertainment Precinct =

Series of sports venues in Melbourne, Australia

Coordinates: 37°49′00″S 144°59′00″E

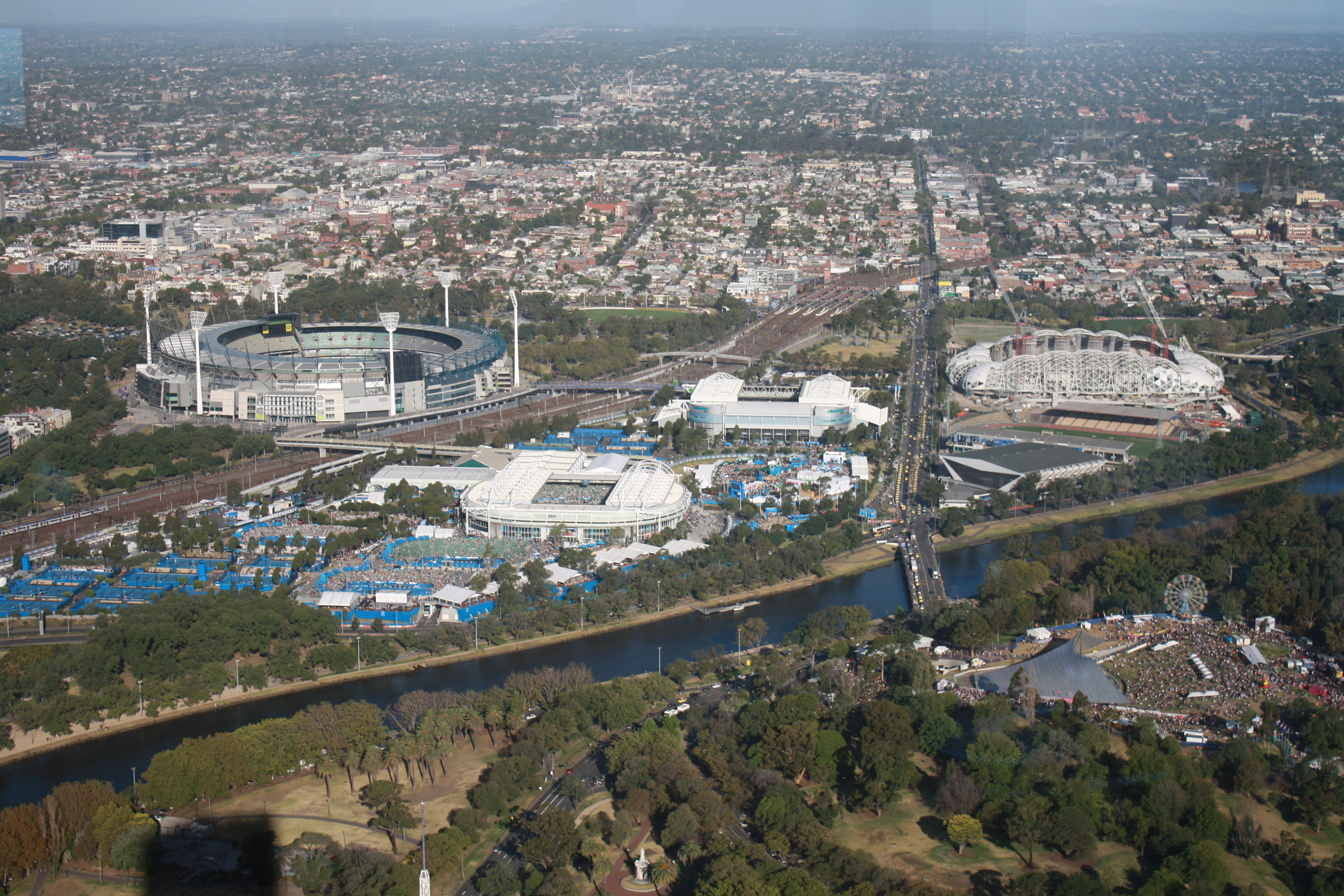
Aerial view of the Melbourne Sports and Entertainment Precinct

The Melbourne Sports and Entertainment Precinct is a series of sports stadiums and venues, located in Melbourne, Victoria, Australia. The precinct is situated around 3 km east of the Melbourne central business district, located in the suburbs of Melbourne and Jolimont, near East Melbourne and Richmond.

It is considered to be Australia's "premier sports precinct" and regularly hosts some of the biggest domestic and international sporting events, including the AFL Grand Final (Australian rules football), Australian Open (tennis) and Boxing Day Test (cricket). The venues have also previously hosted the 1956 Summer Olympics (for which the Precinct served as the Olympic Park) and 2006 Commonwealth Games.

The precinct comprises three areas: Olympic Park, Melbourne Park and Yarra Park.

== Sports venues and stadiums ==
Of the three Park precincts; Olympic Park, Melbourne Park and Yarra Park, the Olympic and Melbourne Parks are jointly managed by the Melbourne and Olympic Parks Trust, and Yarra Park is managed separately by the Melbourne Cricket Club. The precinct is bordered to the north by Wellington Parade, to the east by Punt Road, to the south by the Yarra River, and to the west by Batman Avenue.

=== Olympic Park ===
- AAMI Park (capacity 30,050; outdoor), the premier purpose-built venue for rectangular field sports (rugby league, rugby union and association football), and used for large outdoor stadium concerts.
- Melbourne Sports & Entertainment Centre (indoor), a training facility used by the Collingwood Football Club, but formerly a 7,000 capacity stadium used originally for swimming, then later for basketball.
- Olympic Park Oval (capacity 3,000; outdoor), a public playing field & running track, now primarily used for training purposes by the Collingwood Football Club.
- Gosch's Paddock, a public playing field, previously used for training by the Collingwood Football Club, and now used by the Melbourne Football Club, Melbourne Storm Rugby League Club and Melbourne Victory FC for training and administrative purposes.

==== Former venues ====
- Eastern Sportsground (aka No. 2 Oval), the stadium that hosted the preliminary rounds of the field hockey competition at the 1956 Olympics. Afterward it was used for greyhound racing, then demolished for the first Collingwood training ground (Edwin Flack Field) in the precinct and later became the site of the southern section of AAMI Park.
- Motordrome (capacity 32,000 for racing and 15,000 for football; outdoor), a former speedway and Australian rules football ground. Demolished in 1951 and replaced by Olympic Park Stadium.
- Olympic Park Stadium (capacity 18,500; outdoor), formerly the premier venue for track and field and rectangular field sports. The stadium was superseded for rectangular field sports by AAMI Park in 2011 and was demolished in 2011/12.
- Velodrome (capacity 4,400; indoor), a 333 metre long velodrome that was used for the track cycling events at the 1956 Olympics. This venue was located on the northern section of AAMI Park.

=== Melbourne Park ===
- Rod Laver Arena (capacity 15,000; retractable roof), the premier venue for large indoor stadium concerts, and centre court for tennis in Melbourne Park. Also used in the past for basketball.
- John Cain Arena (capacity 10,500; retractable roof), the premier venue for basketball and netball, the second largest court for tennis in Melbourne Park, and a venue for indoor stadium concerts. Can be converted to a velodrome for major track cycling events.
- Margaret Court Arena (capacity 7,500; retractable roof), the third-largest capacity tennis court in Melbourne Park. Also used for netball, basketball, music and other types of events.
- Show Court Arena (capacity 5,000; no roof), the fourth-largest capacity tennis court in Melbourne Park, was opened prior to the 2022 Australian Open.
- Melbourne Park Tennis Complex/National Tennis Centre, including two outdoor show courts (each with a 3,000 seating capacity), five indoor courts and twenty-eight outdoor Greenset courts, eight clay courts (which are not used professionally), all which are used for professional matches and available for public hire.

=== Yarra Park ===
- Melbourne Cricket Ground (capacity 100,000; outdoor), the premier venue for cricket and Australian rules football, and occasionally for other high-drawing field sports events.
- Punt Road Oval (capacity 2,800; outdoor), training facility for the Richmond Football Club, but formerly used for VFL/AFL Australian rules football matches and premier grade cricket.
- National Sports Museum, located at the Melbourne Cricket Ground.

==== Former venues ====
- East Melbourne Cricket Ground, located in the north-western corner of Yarra Park, and used for Australian rules football and premier grade cricket. Demolished 1922 to make way for the Jolimont railyards.

== 1956 Olympic Games ==
For the 1956 Summer Olympics, several venues hosted Olympic events. The track cycling, field hockey, soccer, and the aquatic events.

== Access ==
The precinct is located adjacent to both the Richmond and Jolimont railway stations; every train servicing the eastern side of Melbourne passes through one of these two stations. The precinct is also serviced by tram route 70 from the city centre. Three footbridges are provided to cross the railway lines which divide the northern and southern halves of the precinct. The area in Yarra Park surrounding the Melbourne Cricket Ground is made available for ticketed car parking during major events in the precinct; free parking in the surrounding streets is available but limited.
