= Dan Moriarty (footballer, born 1875) =

Australian rules footballer

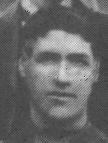

Personal information
- Full name: Daniel Patrick Moriarty
- Born: 18 August 1875; Melbourne, Victoria
- Died: 26 August 1903 (aged 28); Jolimont
- Original team: Fitzroy Juniors

Playing career^{1}
Years	Club	Games (Goals)
1894–96	Fitzroy (VFA)	30 (1)
1897	Fitzroy	12 (2)
1899–1903	Melbourne	62 (2)
- ^{1} Playing statistics correct to the end of 1903.

Career highlights
- VFA premiership player 1895

Daniel Patrick Moriarty (18 August 1875 – 26 August 1903) was an Australian rules footballer who played with Fitzroy and Melbourne in the Victorian Football League (VFL).

Moriarty was killed by a freight train near Jolimont railway station in August 1903, eight days after his 28th birthday. The coroner's inquest determined that he probably died while having an epileptic seizure.
