= Yarra Park =

Park in Melbourne, Victoria, Australia

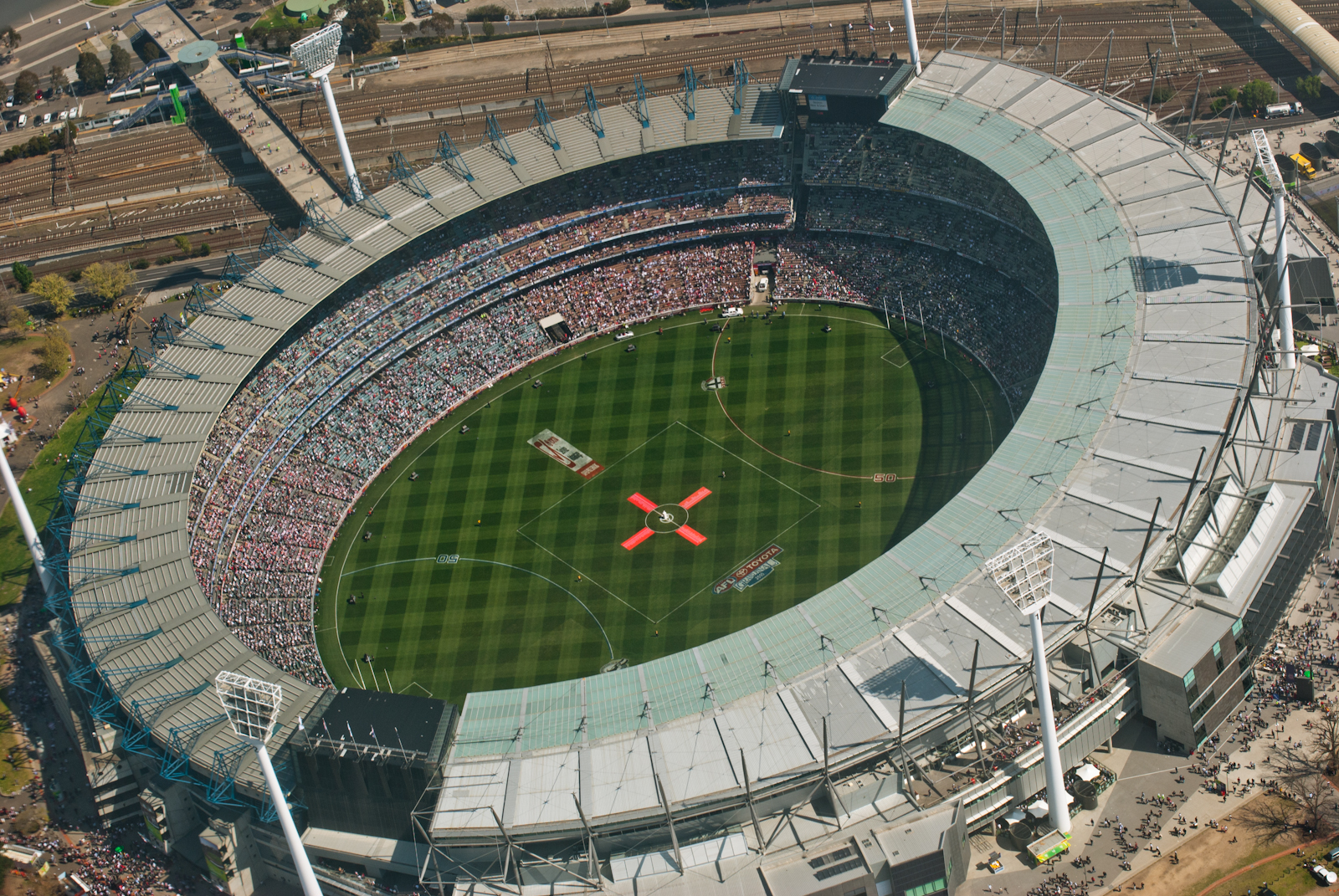
- Yarra Park contains the Melbourne Cricket Ground

- Location within Melbourne
- Interactive map of Yarra Park
- Type: Urban park; sports and entertainment stadia
- Location: East Melbourne, Victoria
- Coordinates: 37°49′05″S 144°59′07″E
- Area: 35.469 ha (87.65 acres)
- Established: 1856; 170 years ago
- Founder: Charles La Trobe
- Designer: Clement Hodgkinson (plantings); Robert Hoddle (surveyor); William Lonsdale (police magistrate)
- Etymology: Yarra River
- Owner: Victorian Government (as crown land)
- Administrator: Melbourne Cricket Ground Trust
- Status: Open; Punt Road Oval: closed (redevelopment)
- Public transit: Richmond, Jolimont; –,, – bus; – 4 footbridges
- Part of: Melbourne Sports and Entertainment Precinct
- Facilities: Melbourne Cricket Ground; Punt Road Oval; National Sports Museum

Victorian Heritage Register
- Official name: Yarra Park
- Type: Registered place
- Designated: 13 May 2010
- Reference no.: H2251
- Category: Parks, Gardens and Trees
- Heritage overlay no.: HO194

Yarra Park is a 35-hectare (86-acre) public park that is part of the Melbourne Sports and Entertainment Precinct, a sporting precinct in Melbourne, Victoria, Australia.

Located in the inner-city suburb of East Melbourne, the park contains the iconic Melbourne Cricket Ground (MCG), Punt Road Oval, and several other sporting fields and ovals, the National Sports Museum, an active playground for children, and many tree-lined paths that criss-cross the park. Located adjacent to Yarra Park are the associated sporting complexes of Melbourne and Olympic Parks, separated by roadways and a rail corridor. In the late 1850s, many of the earliest games of Australian rules football were played in the park, which was known at the time as the Richmond Paddock.

== Overview ==
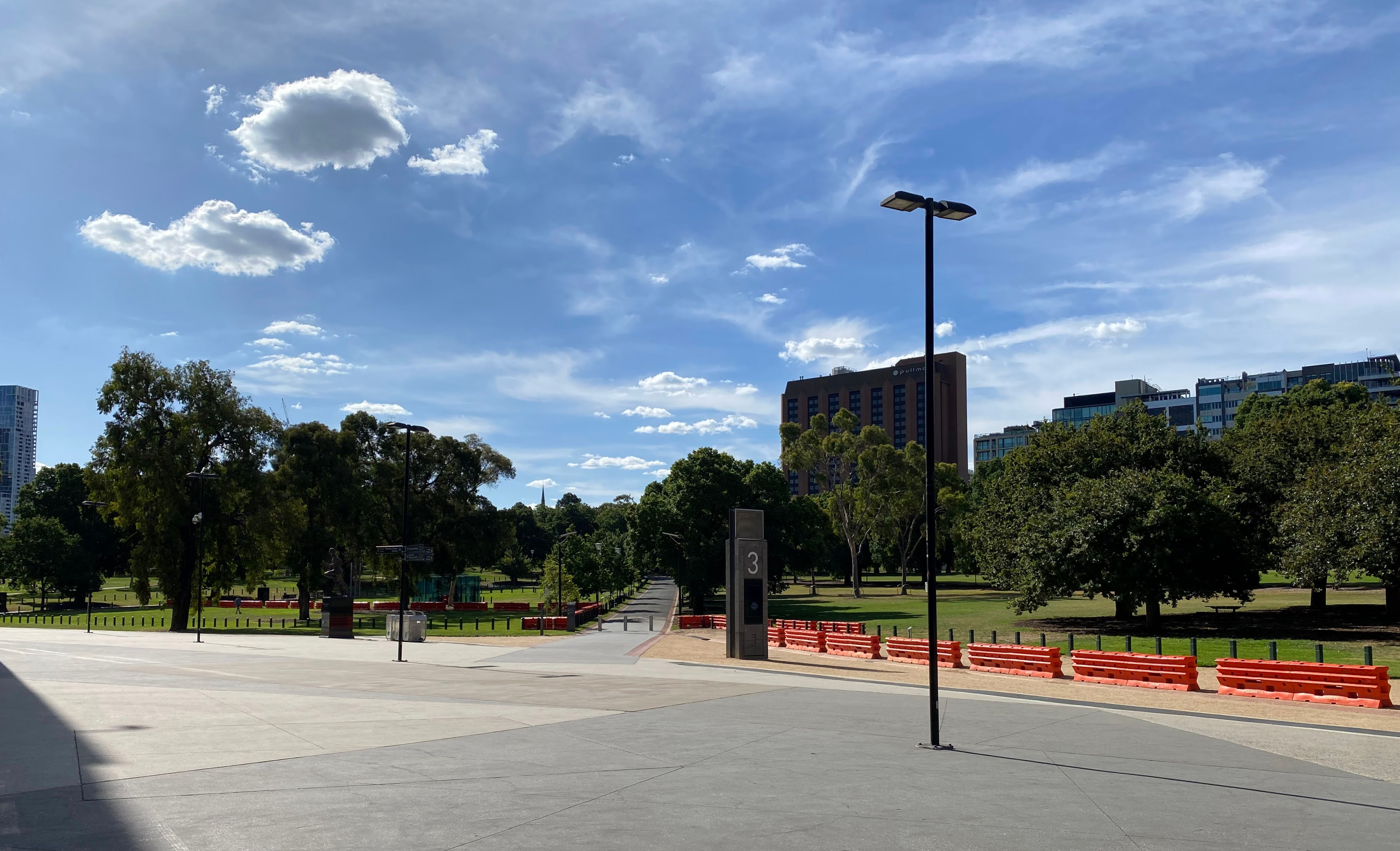
Looking from the MCG north-west, through the park, 2023

The park is bounded by Jolimont station and Wellington Parade to the north; Jolimont Street and Jolimont Terrace to the west; Barassi Way and the railway corridor to the south; and Punt Road and Vale Street to the east. The Richmond station is situated at the south-eastern edge, beyond the park boundaries. Four footbridges enable active transport across the rail corridor to the different sporting venues and easy access to the Yarra River Trail. Limited parking on Yarra Park grassed areas is available for major sporting events.

The park contains seventeen sculptures of Australian sporting heroes including Australian rules footballers Ron Barassi and Dick Reynolds; cricketers Donald Bradman and Keith Miller; and athletes Betty Cuthbert and Shirley Strickland, amongst others, all located near the MCG. An old eucalyptus scar tree which shows a big scar caused by harvesting of bark for a canoe by the original inhabitants of the Yarra River Valley, stands as a monument to the Wurundjeri people of the Kulin nation. At Punt Road Oval, home of the Richmond Football Club, there is a statue of Jack Dyer.

Yarra Park was added to the Victorian Heritage Register on 13 May 2010. The MCG was added to the same register on 19 April 2001 and was included on the Australian National Heritage List in 2005.

== History ==
In 1856, Victorian Governor Charles La Trobe proclaimed 81 hectares (200 acres) of parkland, extending from Punt Road to Swanston Street, and from Wellington Parade to the Yarra River. Initially, the area was also used as police paddocks for the agistment of police horses and was later developed for both active and passive recreation. Yarra Park, comprising 64 hectares (157 acres), was recommended for reservation in 1862. It became known as Richmond Paddock before being temporarily reserved and renamed Yarra Park in 1867. It was permanently reserved in 1873, with ownership jointly vested in the Board of Land and Works with the City of Melbourne.

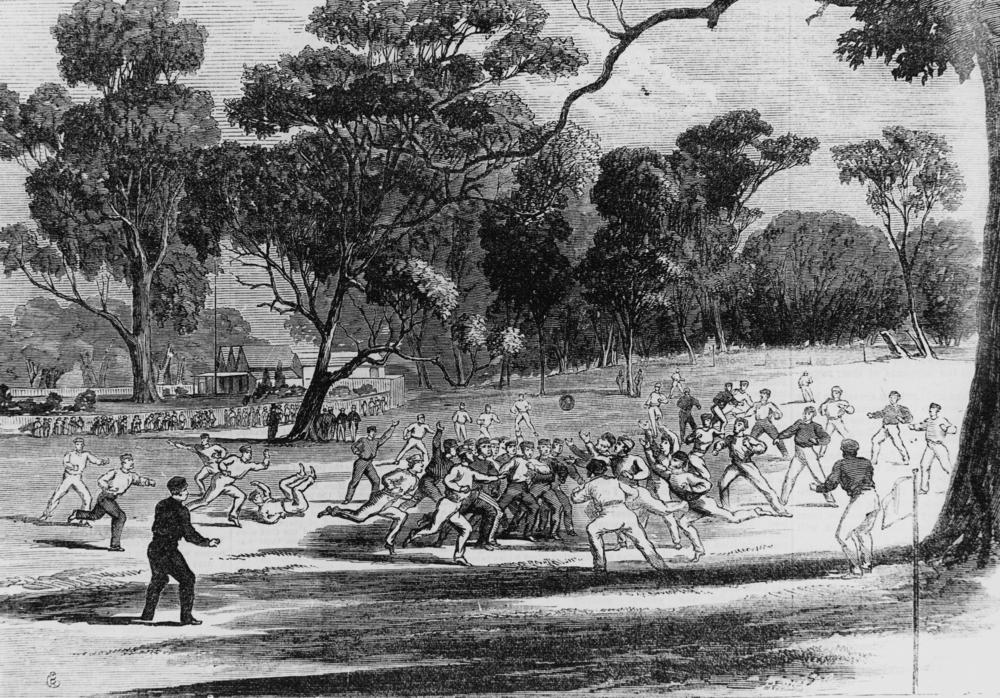
Engraving of a football match at the Richmond Paddock, 1866. A MCG pavilion can be seen on the left in the background.

The earliest recorded matches of Australian rules football were played at the Richmond Paddock in 1858. The Argus wrote the following year:

"Football, like cricket, has become an institution ... expect to see every available portion of Richmond Paddock, and other 'lungs of the city', dotted by animated groups in full pursuit of the leathern spheroid."

It remained an important site for the sport until the MCG and other cricket grounds were opened for football in the late 1870s.

By the 1860s five recreational ovals were marked out: the Melbourne Cricket Ground, Richmond Cricket Ground, East Melbourne Cricket Club ovals (two), and an oval in Gosch's Paddock, (Note: William H. Gosch is first listed in the Sands McDougall Directories Victoria Melbourne in 1910 and as a cartage contractor in 1925. In the 1920’s and 30’s he lived nearby in Melrose Street Cremorne and likely grazed his horses here. By 1945 the business had grown to include his son. In 1924 Mr. W. H. Gosch was elected as a vice president of the Richmond Football Club, a position he held for a number of years. Gosch was made life member of Richmond FC in 1929.) south of Swan Street.

In the southern section of the park land was set aside for the Friendly Society's Gardens (now Olympic Park), and the Scotch College oval. In 1874 Yarra Park Primary School was opened in the north east corner of the park. A housing subdivision was excised from the park in 1881.

Since this time major excisions have been made for Melbourne's eastern and southeastern rail lines, the Hurstbridge railway line, Olympic Park Sporting Complex, Rod Laver Arena in Melbourne Park's National Tennis Centre, the south eastern freeway, and the Burnley Tunnel. Gosch's Paddock links Yarra Park to the Yarra River at the Morrell Bridge for cyclists and pedestrians; however, Gosch's Paddock lies within the Olympic Park zone of the Melbourne Sports and Entertainment Precinct.

== Ownership and management ==
The entire park area is Crown land with ownership vested in the Victorian Government. Daily management is carried out by the Melbourne Cricket Ground Trust, as determined under the Melbourne (Yarra Park) Land Act, 1980. Additional regulations pertain specifically to the MCG, as detailed in the Melbourne Cricket Ground and Yarra Park Amendment Act, 2009 (the MCG Act).

In 2022, the Victorian Government approved a major redevelopment of Punt Road Oval, including enlarging the size of the oval to match the measurements of the MCG and Docklands Stadium, build a new grandstand, community and club facilities, and car parking, as well as landscaping. Work on the site commended in August 2025 and is expected to be completed during 2027, funded by Richmond Football Club.

== Gallery ==
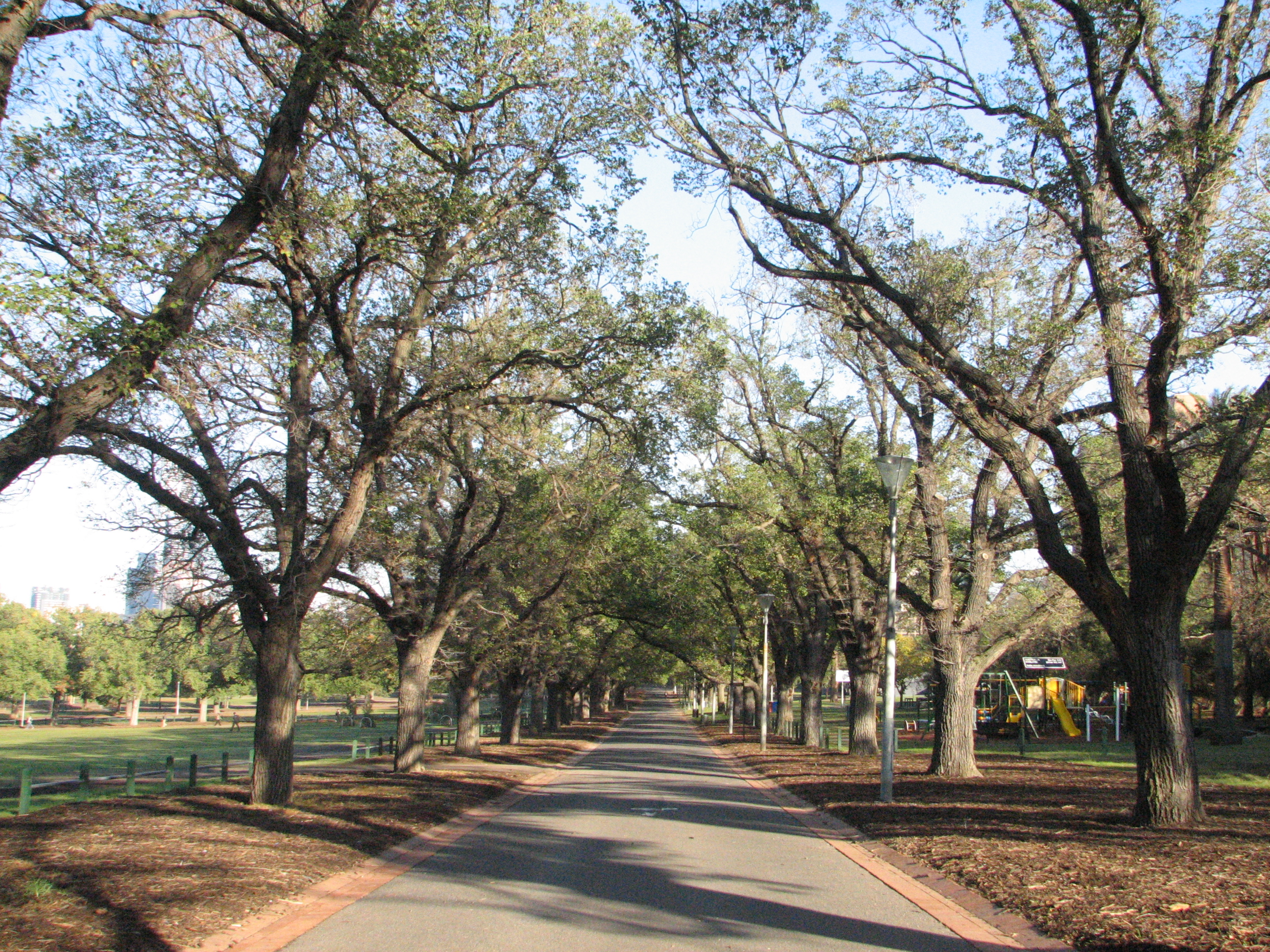
Paths in the park, April 2007

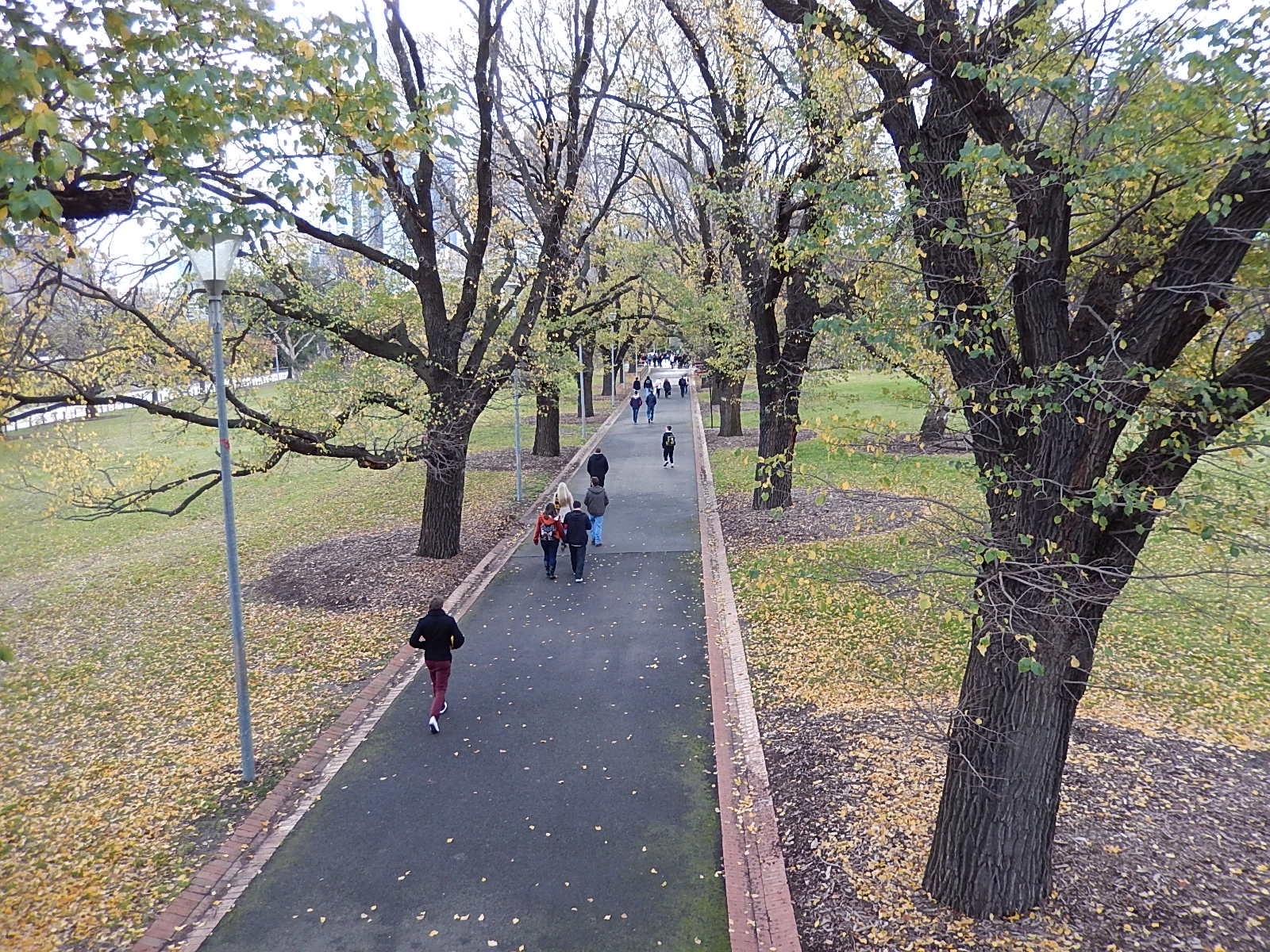
Late autumn in the park, June 2013

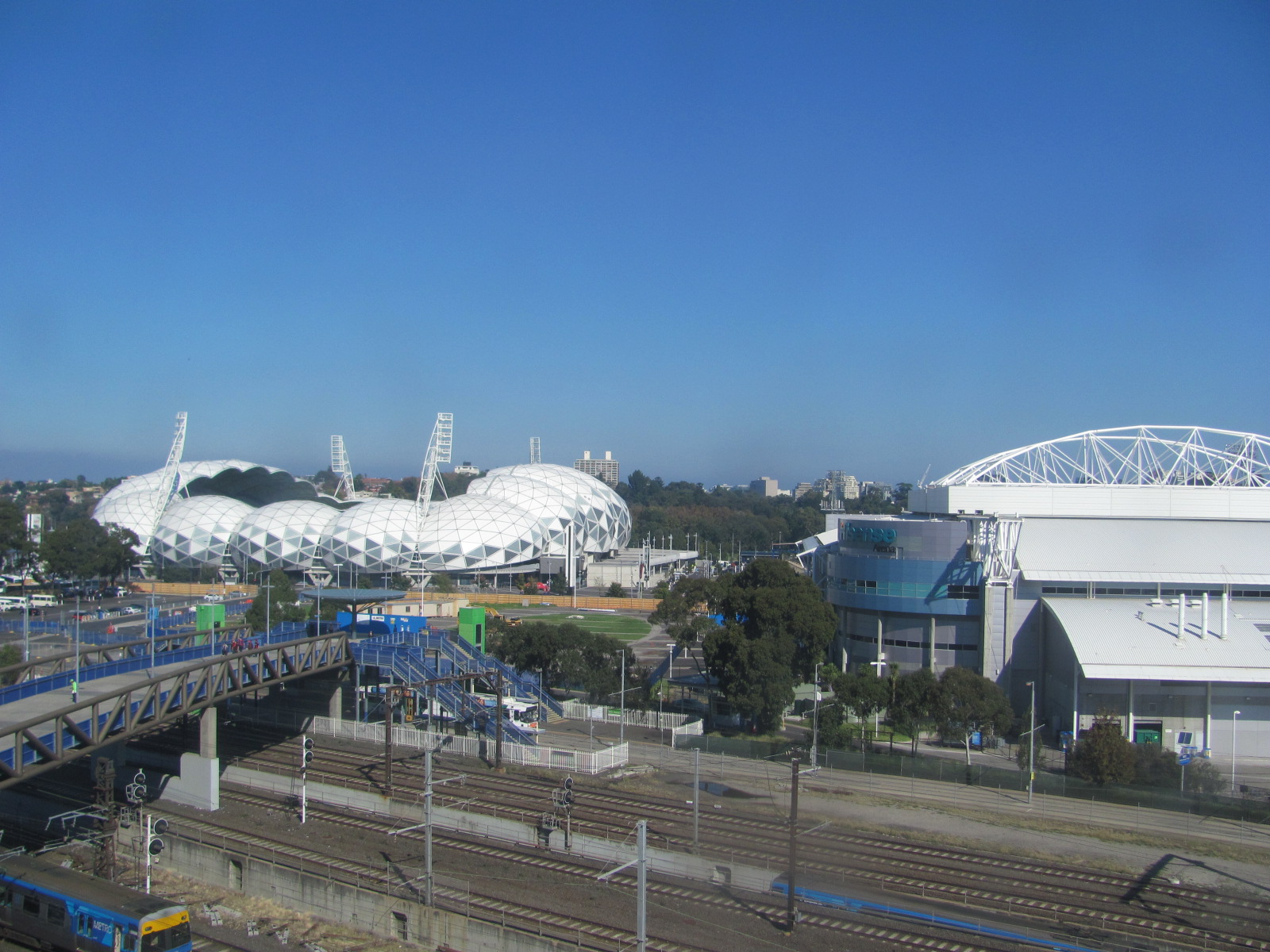
Melbourne Rectangular Stadium, viewed from the MCG in Yarra Park

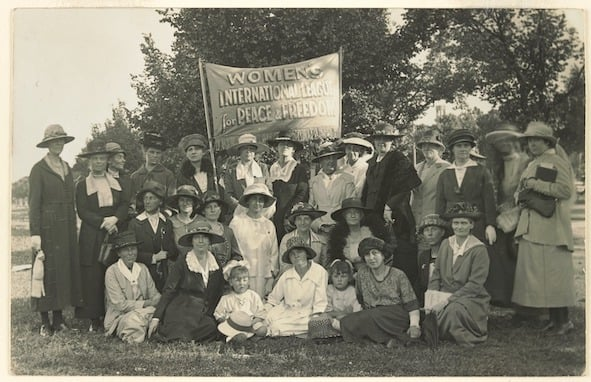
Women and children protesting in the park for peace, 1921

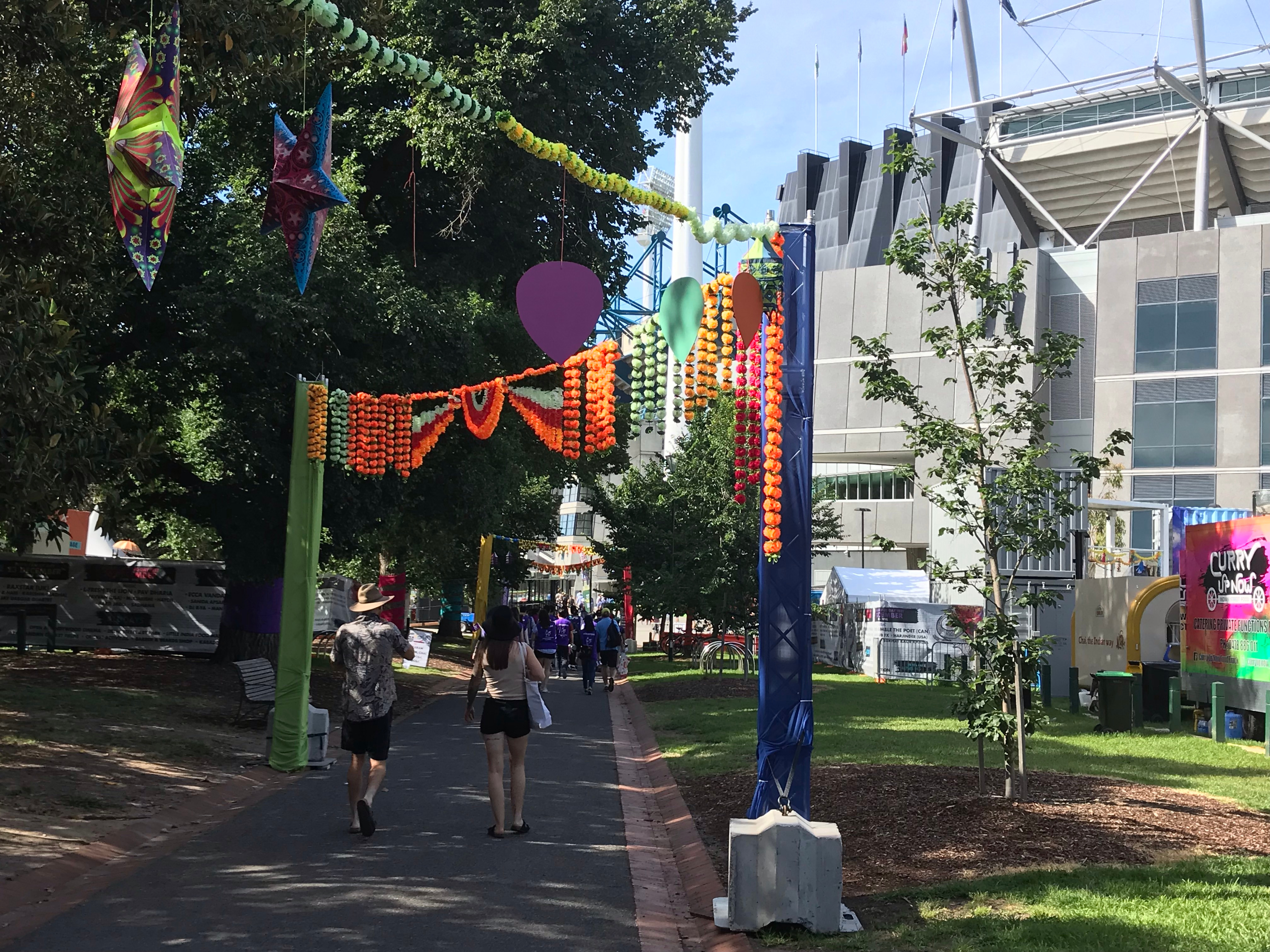
A path in the park, Christmas 2018

== See also ==
- Parks and gardens of Melbourne
- Heritage gardens in Australia
- List of heritage-listed buildings in Melbourne
