= JLI =

JLI may refer to:

- Jefferson Lines, an intercity bus company operating in the United States
- Jewish Learning Institute
- Jolimont railway station, Melbourne
- Justice League International
