= Bishopscourt, East Melbourne =

Coordinates: 37°48′47″S 144°59′02″E

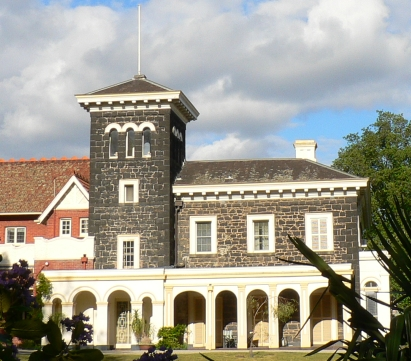
Bishopscourt, Clarendon Street

Bishopscourt is a large colonial mansion located on Clarendon Street in East Melbourne, Australia.

Designed by Newson & Blackburn using blue stone in a style of gothic architecture, it was completed in 1853. The red brick wing was added in 1903.

Since completion, it has been used as the residence for all of Melbourne's Anglican diocesan bishops and archbishops. From 1874 to 1876, it was used as Victoria's Government House.

The house is on the Victorian Heritage Register.

== Sources ==
- Grant, James (2010). A Suitable Residence: A Brief History of Bishopscourt Melbourne. Australian Scholarly Publishing Pty Ltd. ISBN 978-1-921509-80-3.
- https://bishopscourt.org.au/
