= East Melbourne =

- Suburb
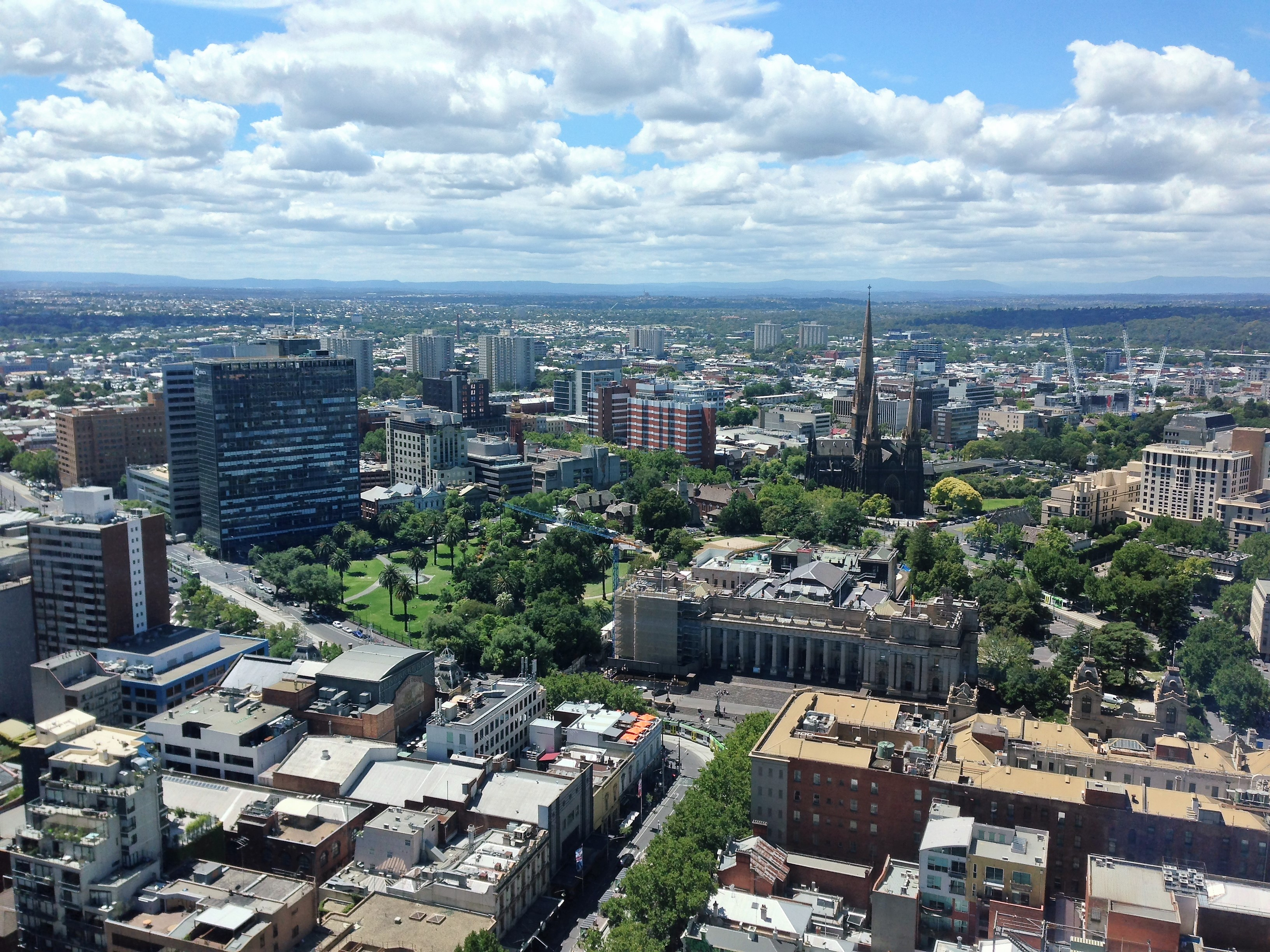
- Looking toward Eastern Hill (East Melbourne's northern end) from the Melbourne central business district. Visible landmarks (from left to right) include ICI House, East Melbourne Hebrew Congregation, Eastern Hill Fire Station, Parliament House, St Peter's Church, Eastern Hill, Victorian Artists Society buildings, St Patrick's Cathedral, Former St Patrick's College tower, Tasma Terrace as well as Spring Street and Parliament Place tram routes.

- Interactive map of East Melbourne
- Coordinates: 37.813°S 144.985°E
- Country: Australia
- State: Victoria
- City: Melbourne
- LGA: City of Melbourne
- Location: 2 km (1.2 mi) from Melbourne
- Established: 1840

Government
  - State electorate: Melbourne
  - Federal division: Melbourne

Area
  - Total: 1.9 km^{2} (0.73 sq mi)
- Elevation: 32 m (105 ft)

Population
  - Total: 4,896 (2021 census)
  - Density: 2,580/km^{2} (6,670/sq mi)
- Postcode: 3002
Suburbs around East Melbourne
Fitzroy	Collingwood	Abbotsford
Melbourne CBD	East Melbourne	Richmond
Melbourne CBD	Melbourne CBD	Cremorne

East Melbourne is an inner-city suburb in Melbourne, Victoria, Australia, 2 km (1.2 mi) east of Melbourne's Central Business District, located within the City of Melbourne local government area. East Melbourne recorded a population of 4,896 at the 2021 census.

East Melbourne is a small area of inner Melbourne, located between Richmond and the Central Business District. Broadly, it is bounded by Spring Street, Victoria Parade, Punt Road/Hoddle Street and Brunton Avenue.

One of Melbourne's earliest suburbs, East Melbourne has long been home to many significant government, health and religious institutions, including the Parliament of Victoria and offices of the Victoria State Government in the Parliamentary and Cathedral precincts, which are located on a gentle hill at the edge of the Melbourne's Hoddle Grid, known as Eastern Hill. The world-famous Melbourne Cricket Ground (MCG) is located in Yarra Park, in the East Melbourne locality of Jolimont. East Melbourne has been affluent since its first establishment and contains some of the oldest Victorian homes and terrace houses and parks and gardens in Melbourne.

== Geography ==
The Parliamentary and Cathedral precincts are located on a gentle hill, known as Eastern Hill. Jolimont railway station is at the top of a ridge, which extends towards Bridge Road in Richmond, from which Jolimont slopes downwards towards the Yarra River and the residential section to the north slopes gradually towards the flatter areas of Fitzroy and Collingwood to the north and Richmond to the south.

== History ==
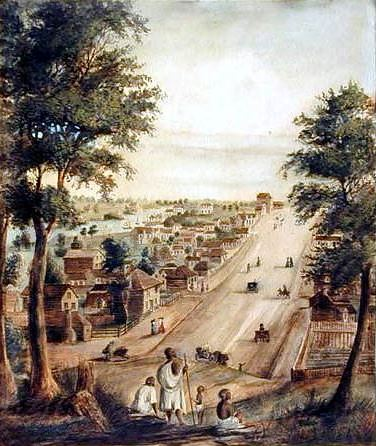
Illustration of Eastern Hill in 1839, the bounds of East Melbourne prior to its settlement looking toward Collins Street. Wurundjeri are depicted at the approximate site of the Old Treasury which wouldn't be built for another two decades.

The area now known as East Melbourne was inhabited from an estimated 31,000 to 40,000 years ago and Eastern Hill was originally known as Ngár-go (or "high ground") by the Wurundjeri along with Fitzroy. The flat ground known today as Jolimont extending toward the Yarra was part of the area also known by the Wurundjeri as Quo-Yung (or "dead trees").

It was named East Melbourne in 1837 by Port Phillip District surveyor Robert Hoddle, but was not actually settled until 1840, some time after neighbouring Fitzroy and Collingwood. Among the first settlers was Charles La Trobe, who built a transportable dwelling in 1840 and wealthy professionals followed, establishing mansions there. The plan of the alignment of streets was adopted in July 1849.

In the 1960s and 1970s, while other inner-city suburbs were experiencing gentrification, East Melbourne, traditionally a blue ribbon district, experienced a temporary decline. Flats began to appear and replace many of the old mansions. Many remaining mansions had been converted to rooming houses over the years. The construction of the Hilton Hotel saw the demolition of Cliveden mansions, a five-storey Victorian era terrace and the largest mansion in Melbourne (a small section of the panelling, doors and other decoration of the ballroom is retained in the formal restaurant of the Hilton). Office development and expansion of the hospitals in the area affected much of the area surrounding Victoria Parade.

During the 1990s East Melbourne once again experienced a sharp increase in property prices. The Becton development at Jolimont, modelled on a picturesque Georgian village, created one of inner-city Melbourne's first exclusive enclaves. Many of the remaining mansions and terraces were placed on heritage registers and subdivided into apartments. Later the Victoria Brewery was also converted into exclusive apartments, named "TriBeCa", after the Manhattan neighbourhood.

East Melbourne's proximity to the city, its small size and its relatively unspoilt streetscapes ensure its property is expensive and highly sought after.

== Population ==
At the 2016 census, East Melbourne had a population of 4,964. 62.8% of people were born in Australia. The next most common countries of birth were England 4.2% and New Zealand 3.0%. 75.0% of people only spoke English at home. The most common responses for religion were No Religion 42.8% and Catholic 18.3%.

== Notable buildings ==
=== Public and institutional buildings ===
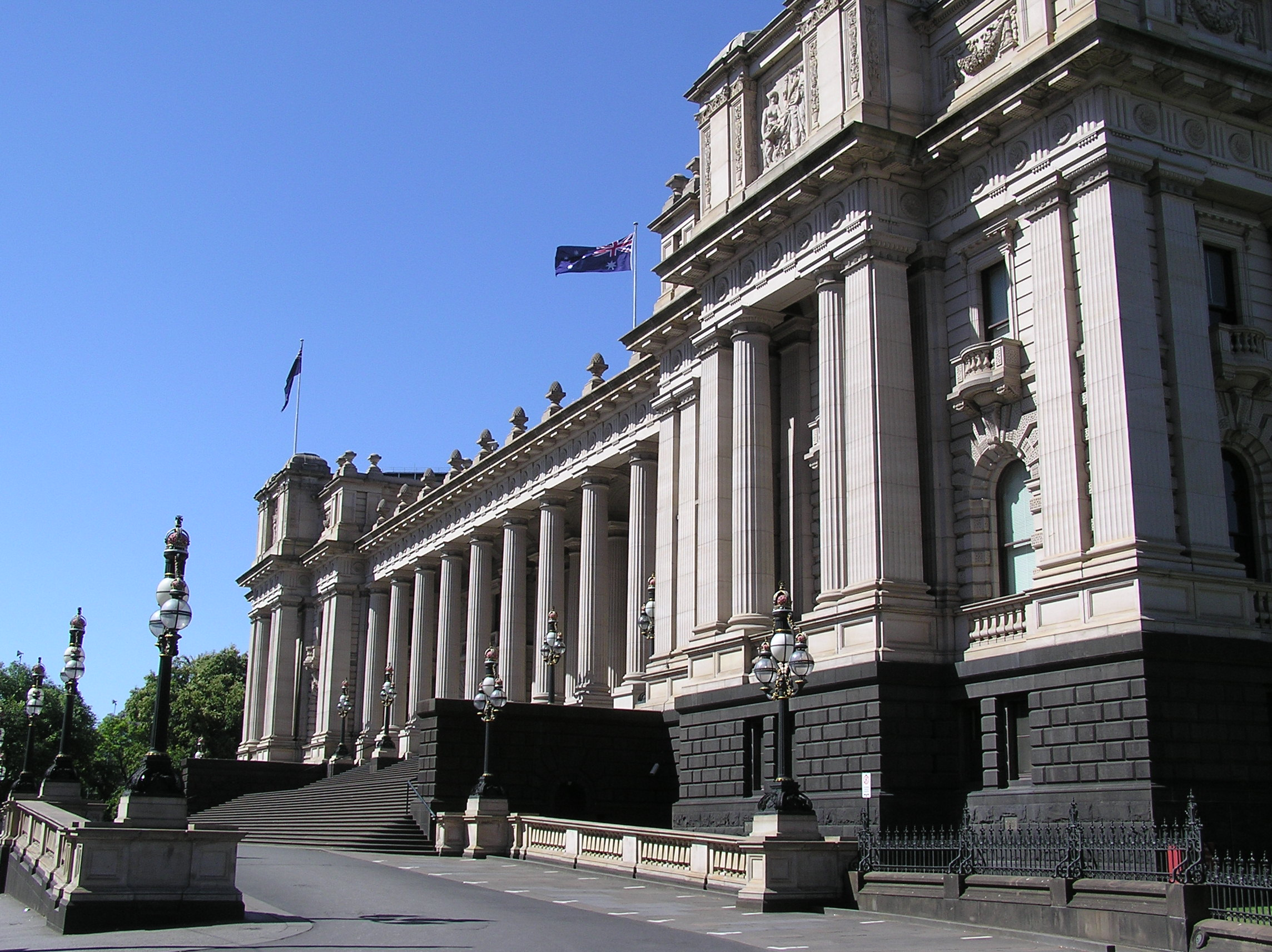
Parliament House, Spring Street

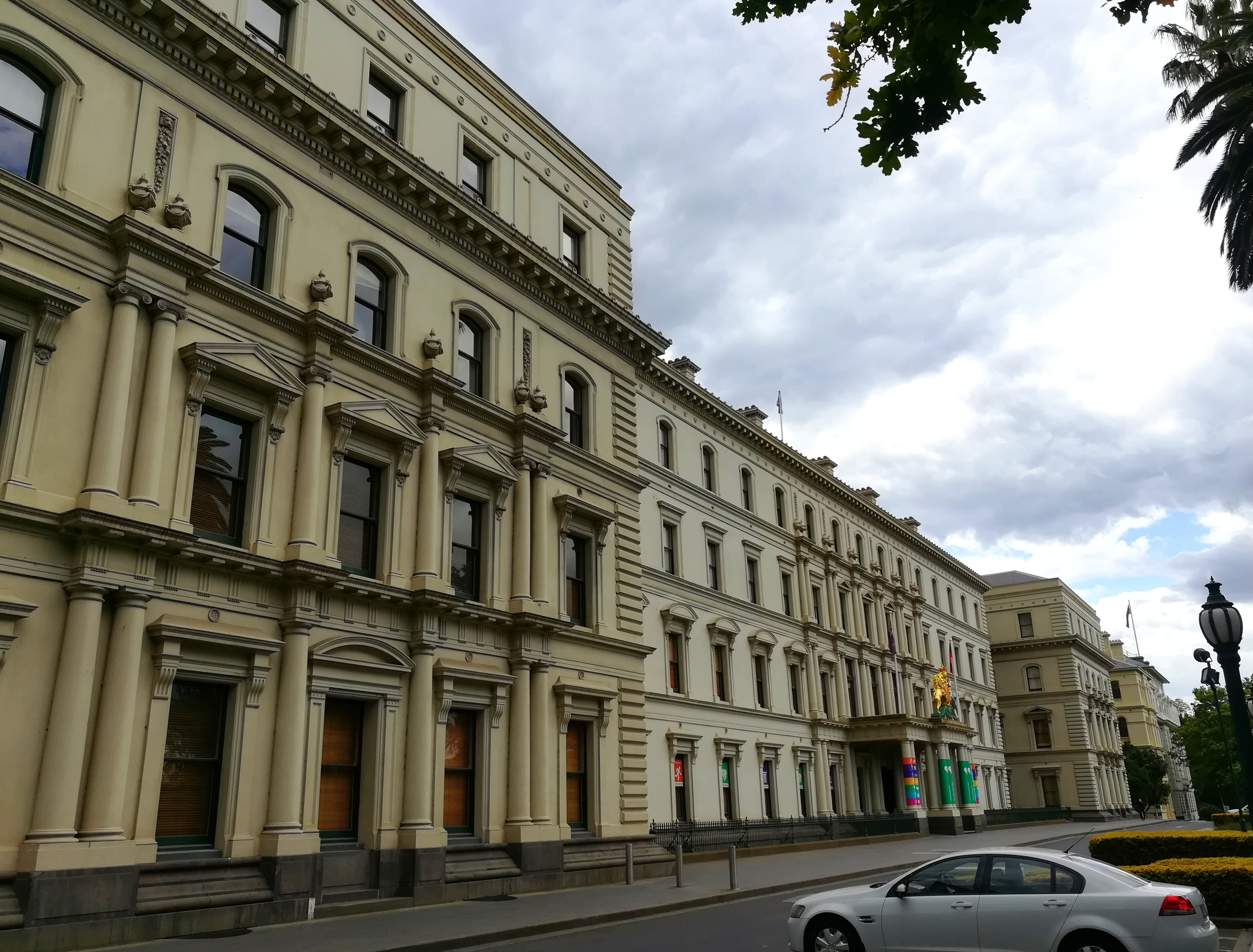
Treasury Place

East Melbourne is home to the Government of Victoria in the Parliamentary precinct at Spring Street and Treasury Place. Treasury Place is notable for its government buildings on Spring Street, including Parliament House of Victoria (built in 1856 to the design of Peter Kerr) and the old Treasury Building (built in 1857 to the design of John James Clark). Treasury Place forms Australia's finest Renaissance revival streetscape, combining the facades of the Premier's Department and Treasury, State Offices, now occupied by the Education Department, the former Government Printing Office and Commonwealth Government Offices (built 1912–1914 to the design of John Smith Murdoch), all overlooking the Treasury Gardens. The rear of these offices is a feature of St Andrews Place.

Following the Federation of Australia, the Commonwealth Offices Building served as the administration buildings for the Government of Australia from 1911 to 1927 including the Prime Minister and Governor General's offices.

=== Religious buildings ===
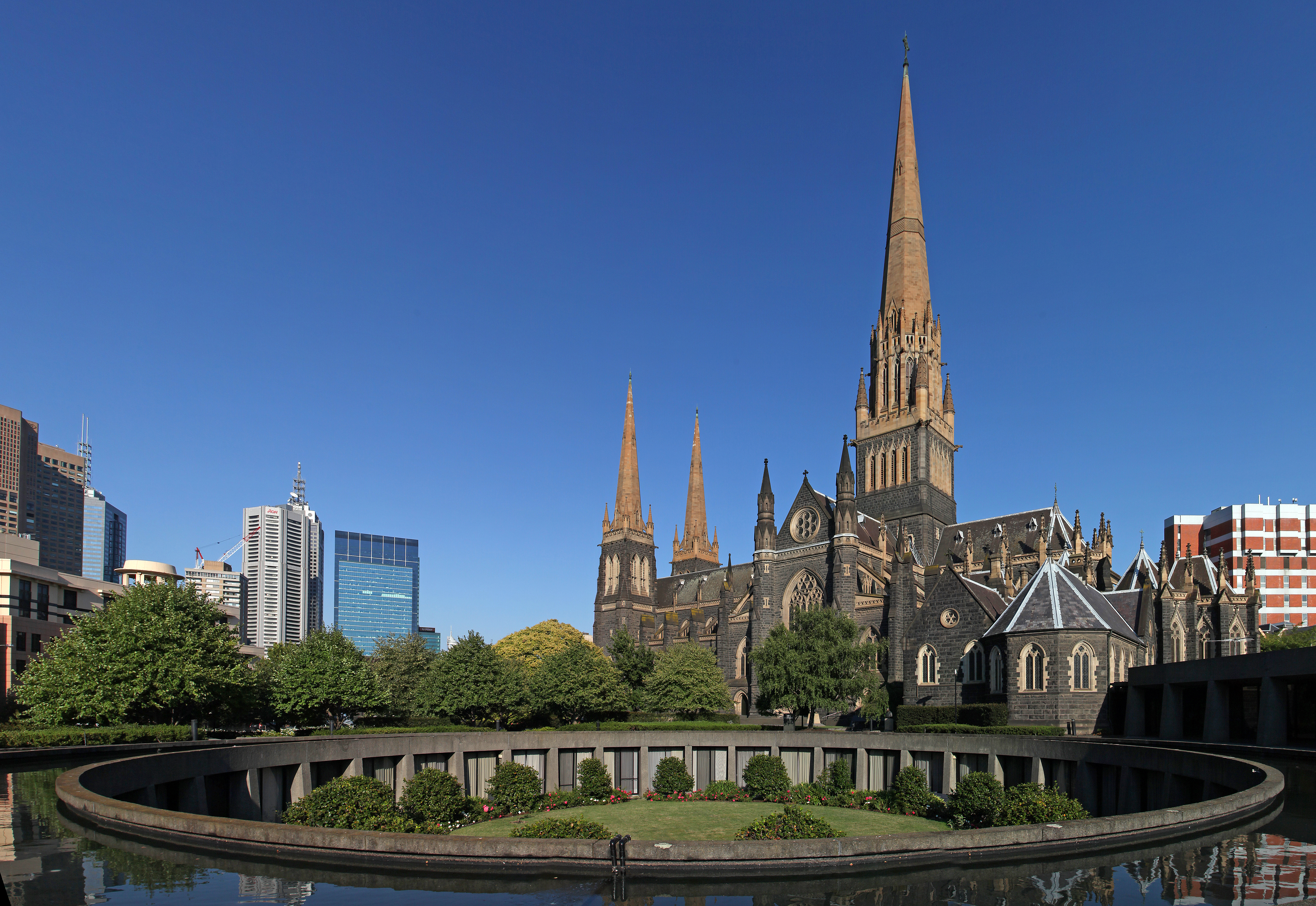
St Patrick's Cathedral

Nearby Cathedral Place is home to St Patrick's Cathedral, Catholic Theological College and many other former religious buildings now serving mixed use. The Anglican St Peter's Church sits opposite the Catholic cathedral.

The former Baptist Church House, built between 1859 and 1863, although substantially modified during conversion into an office building, is one of the finer classical styled buildings in East Melbourne and was designed by Thomas Watts.

On the corner of Hotham and Powlett Streets, the large Cairns Memorial Presbyterian Church, which was built in the 1880s was subject to an innovative apartment conversion after the church was gutted by fire in 1988, leaving only the exterior sandstone shell.

=== Commercial buildings ===
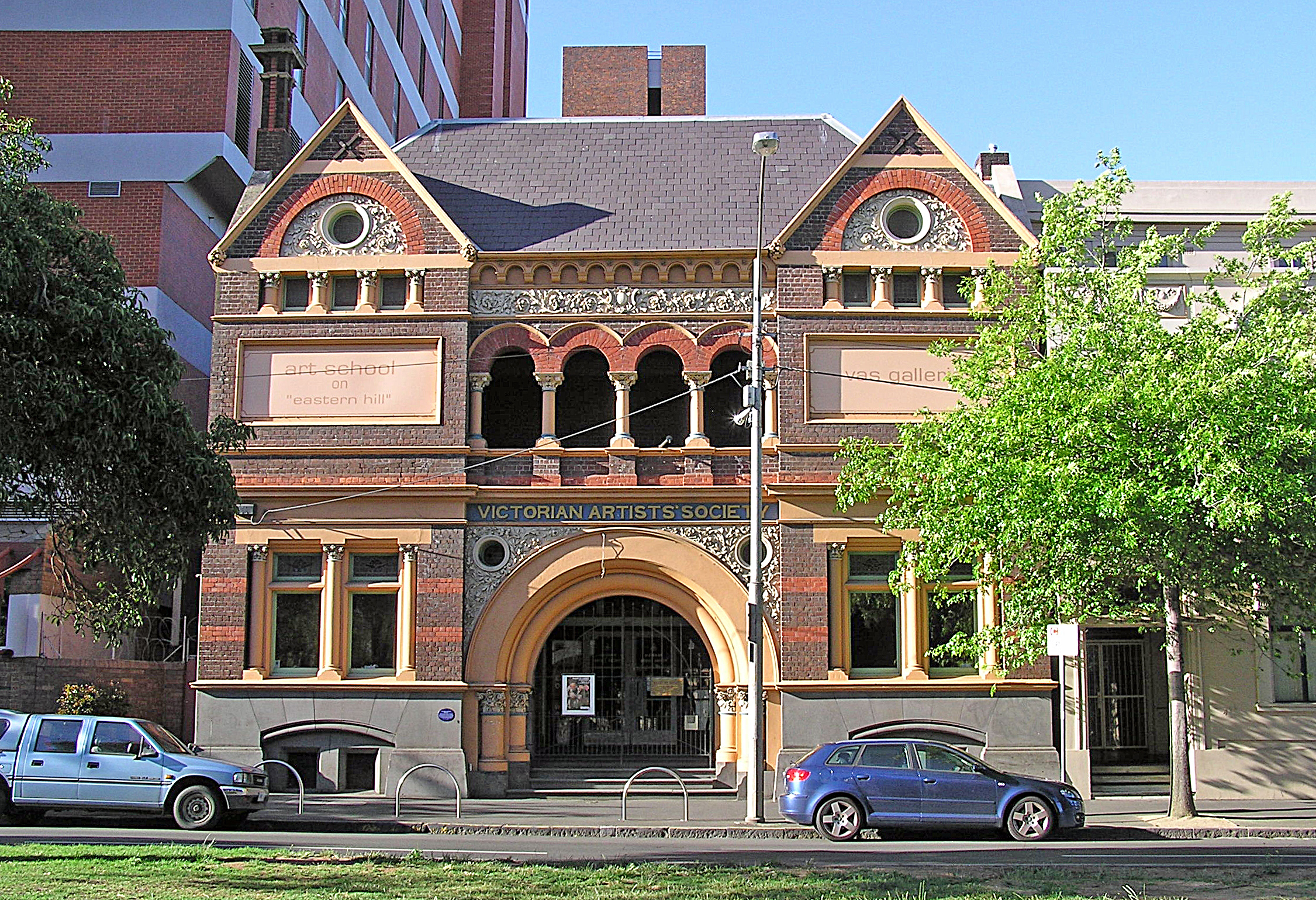
Victorian Artists Society, Albert Street

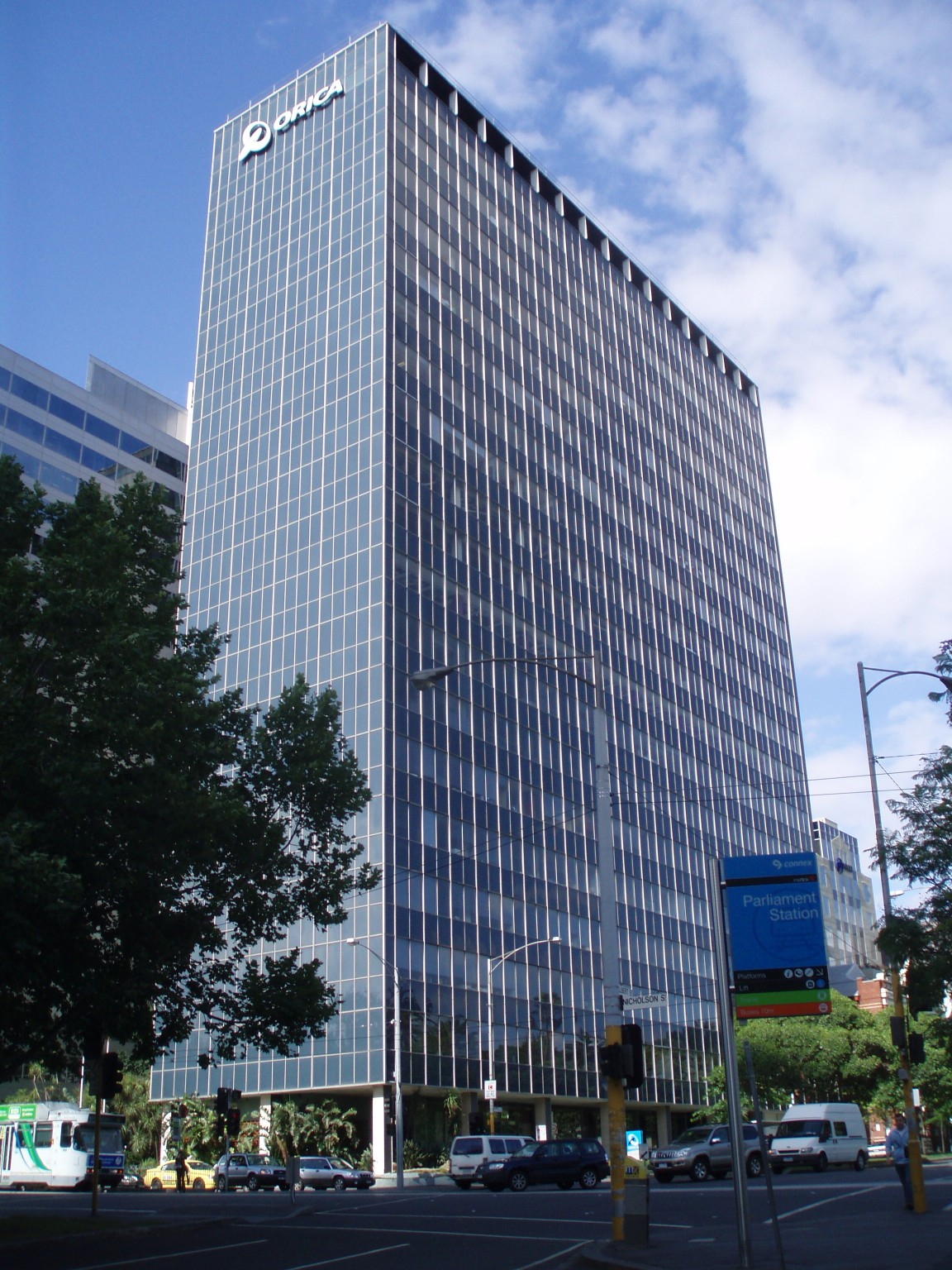
Orica House, Nicholson Street

Other notable buildings include the Arts & Crafts style of the Victorian Artists Society (1892) by Richard Speight and Harry Tompkins, the Eastern Hill Fire Station (1893) and the East Melbourne Synagogue (1877) by Crouch & Wilson.

Orica House, built on the edge of the Melbourne CBD on Nicholson Street between 1955 and 1958 and designed by Bates, Smart & McCutcheon, is notable as being one of the first curtain wall glass skyscrapers in the world and the first skyscraper to break Melbourne's strict height limits. Until 1961, it was also Australia's tallest building.

Victoria Brewery (1882), between Albert and Victoria Streets, is notable as an early work of William Pitt. Its castellated facade has since been partially restored and converted into the TriBeCa apartments.

=== Housing ===
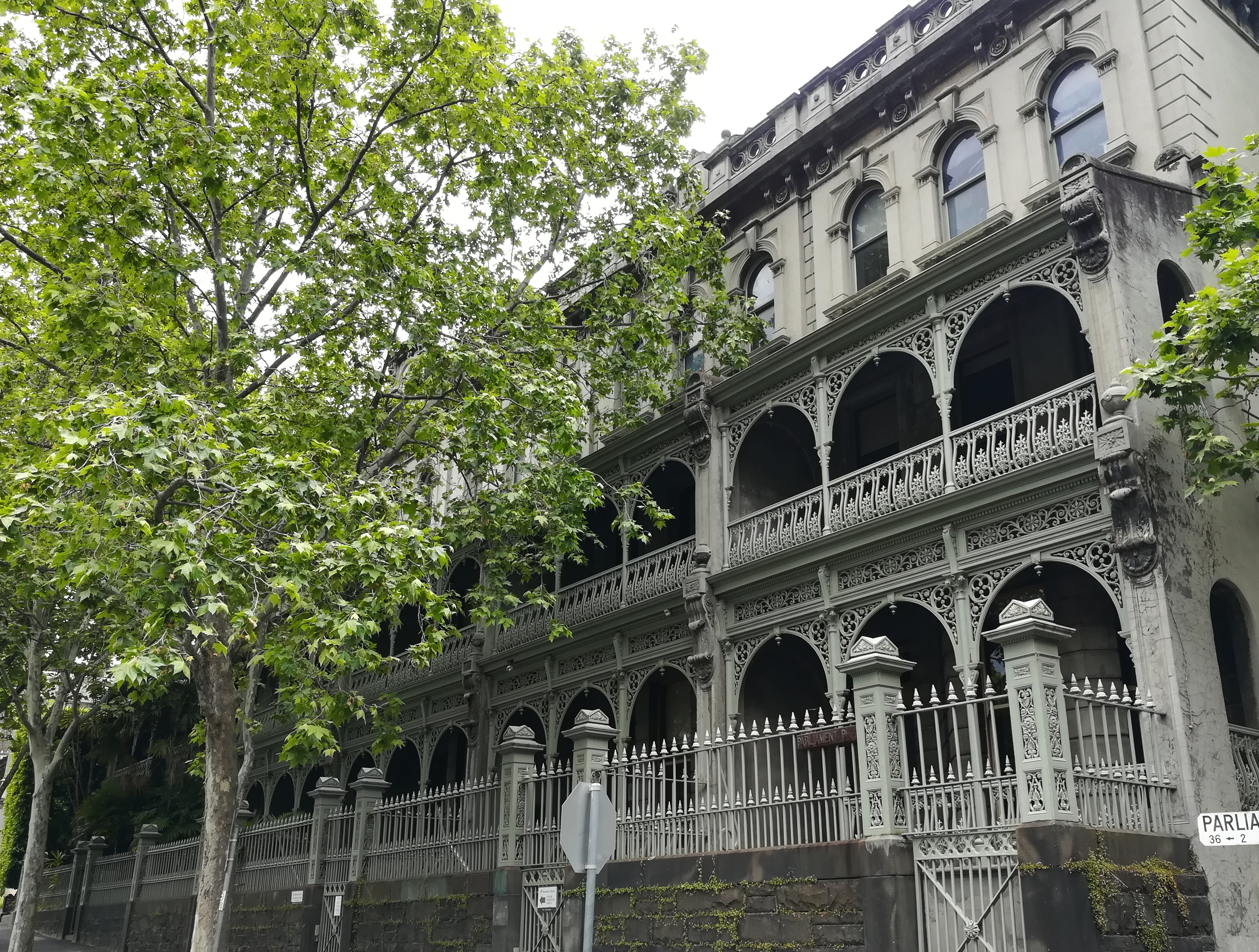
Tasma Terrace, home of the National Trust of Victoria, is considered Melbourne's finest Victorian terrace row

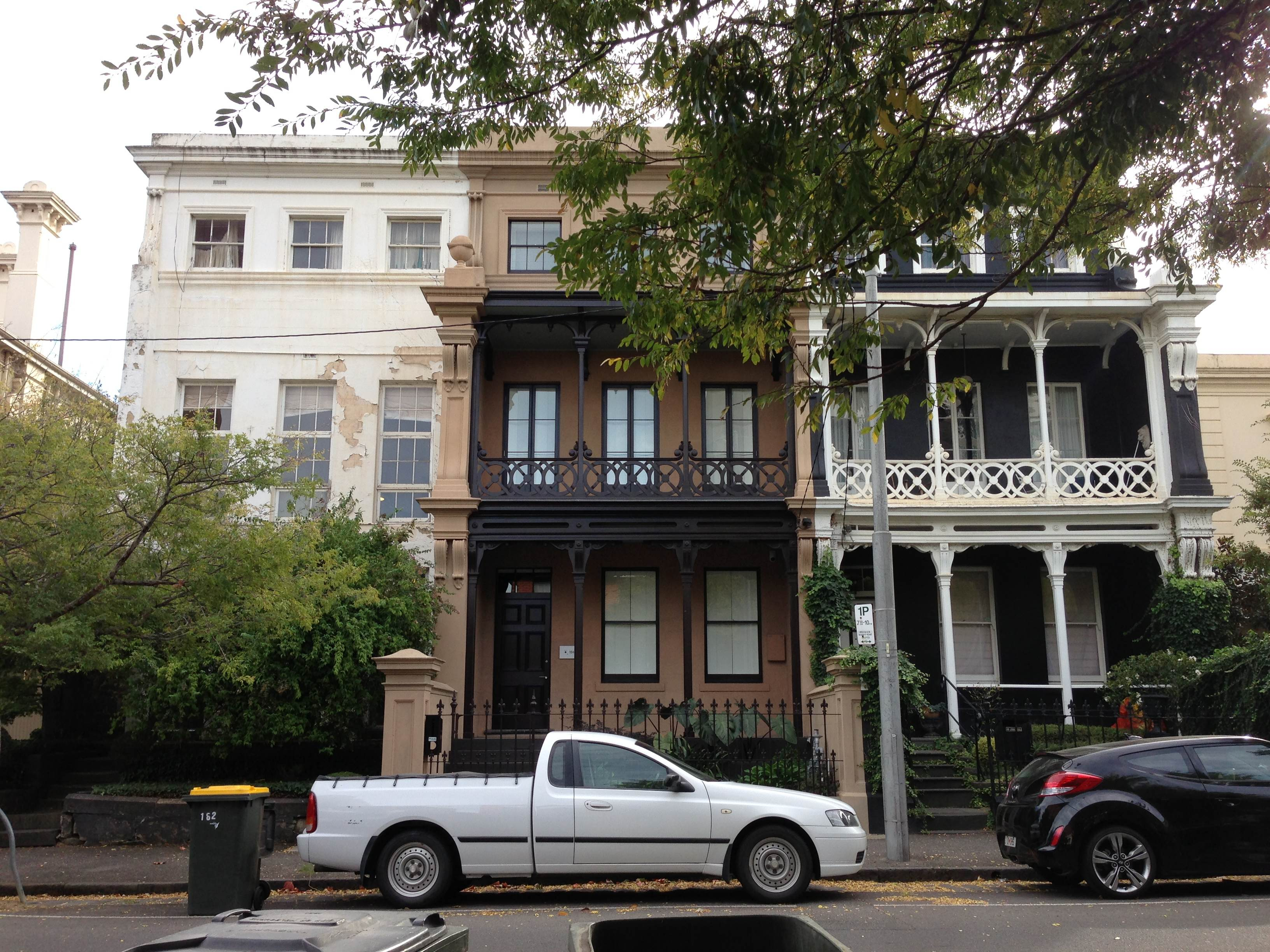
Three-storey terraces at 182-186 George Street.

East Melbourne is home to some of Melbourne's earliest houses. While notable terrace housing is predominant in the area, the suburb also has some fine remnant mansions, the oldest and largest in East Melbourne being the blue stone colonial mansion Bishopscourt (designed by Newson & Blackburn), which dates back to 1853, was used as Victoria's Government House in 1874–1876 and has been the residence for all of Melbourne's Anglican Bishops and Archbishops since its completion. It is on the Victorian Heritage Register. The two-storey house at 157 Hotham Street, built in 1861, is notable as a rare example of bluestone gothic applied to residential architecture. The house is often attributed to Joseph Reed and considered one of his early residential works. Accordingly, it is also listed on the Victorian Heritage Register.

Several terrace houses are notable, including Tasma Terrace (1878), by architect Charles Webb, arguably Melbourne's finest terrace home and headquarters of the National Trust in Victoria, Clarendon (the home of Her Place Women's Museum), East Melbourne Terrace, Annerley in George Street and Cypress Terrace (1867) in Hotham Street.

The large Queen Anne-styled townhouse building known as Queen Bess Row is also notable. Completed in 1887 and designed by architect firm Tappin, Gilbert and Dennehy, this impressive red brick building dominates a main residential corner. Another landmark is Eastbourne Terrace, an eclectic Edwardian terrace, on the corner of Simpson Street and Wellington Parade.

East Melbourne is also characterised by Art Deco houses and apartment buildings. One unique example of the architectural legacy is the "Dorijo" apartment building, located at 458 Victoria Parade. Designed by architect I.G Anderson in 1934, Dorijo's significant aspects include a reduction in the size of the three balconies that progress up the facade of the building structure and the unmistakable tower at the top of the building, with links to his other, more controversial site, Lonsdale House.

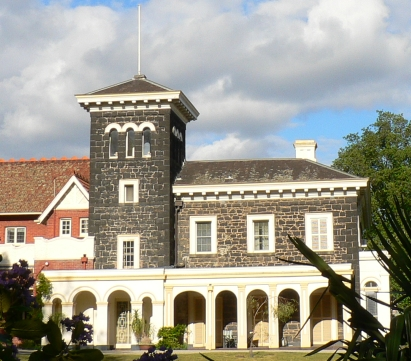
Bishopscourt, East Melbourne (1853) Joseph Reed architect

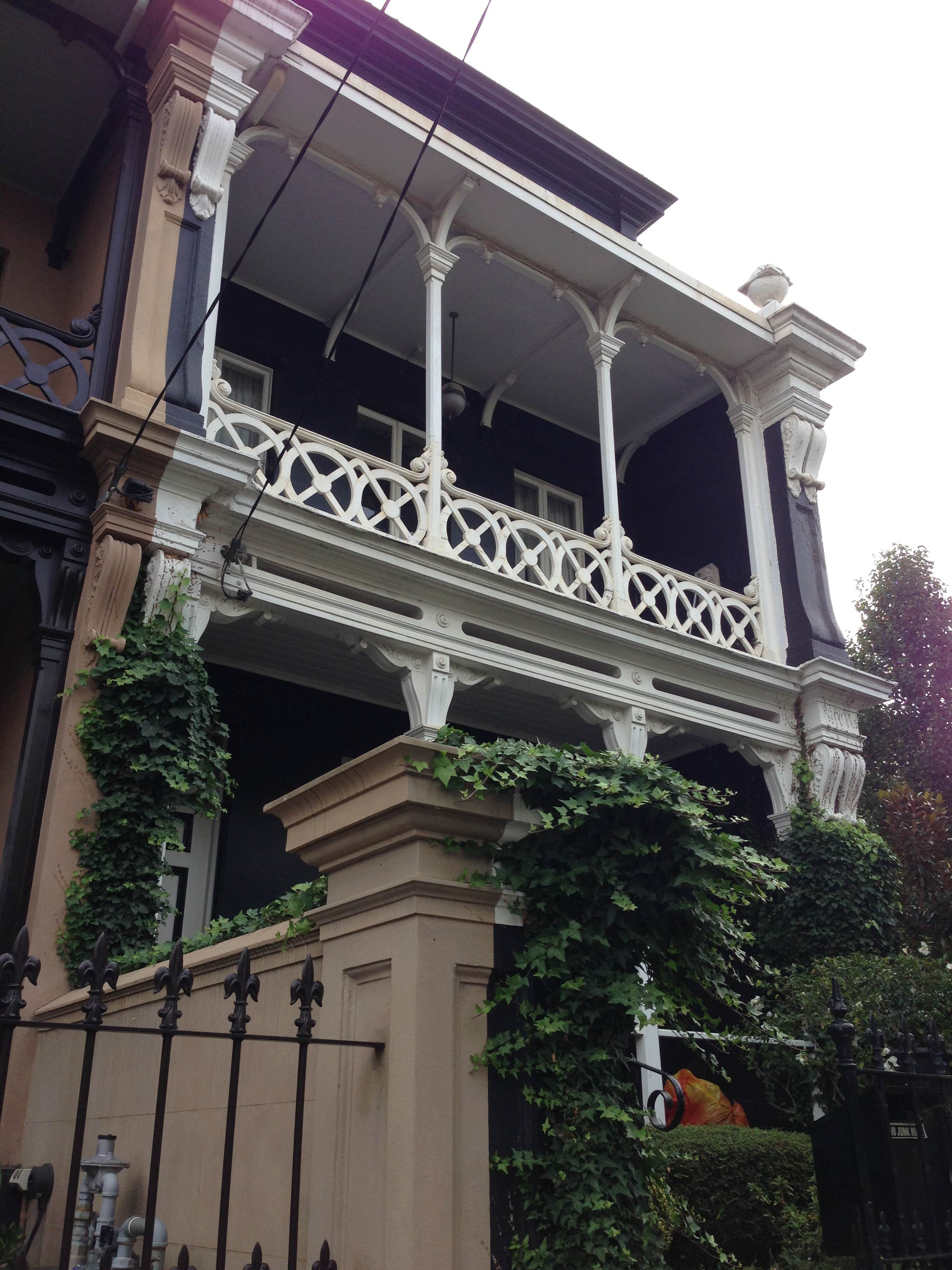
186 George Street (1856) Joseph Reed

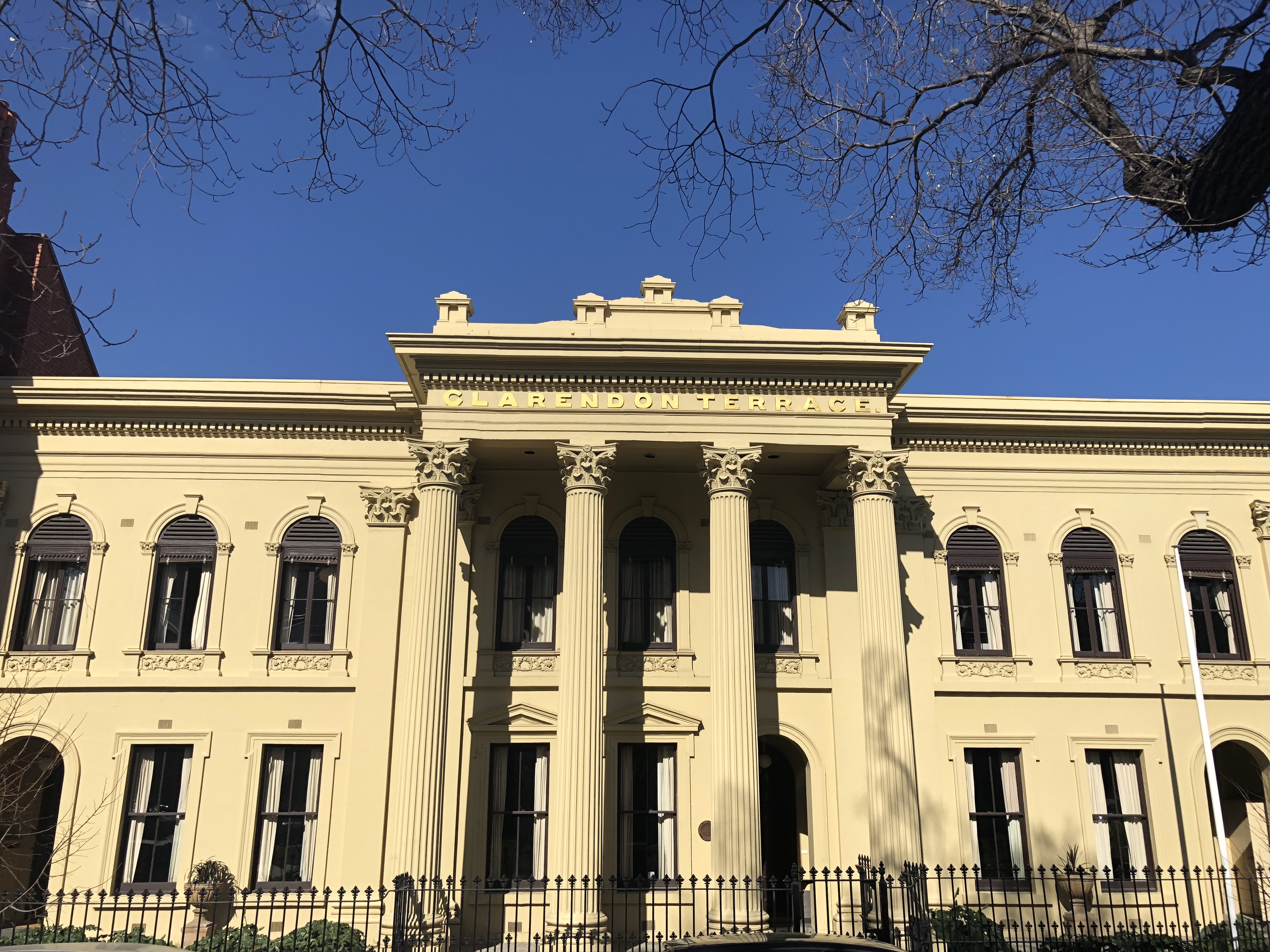
Clarendon Terrace, East Melbourne (1857)

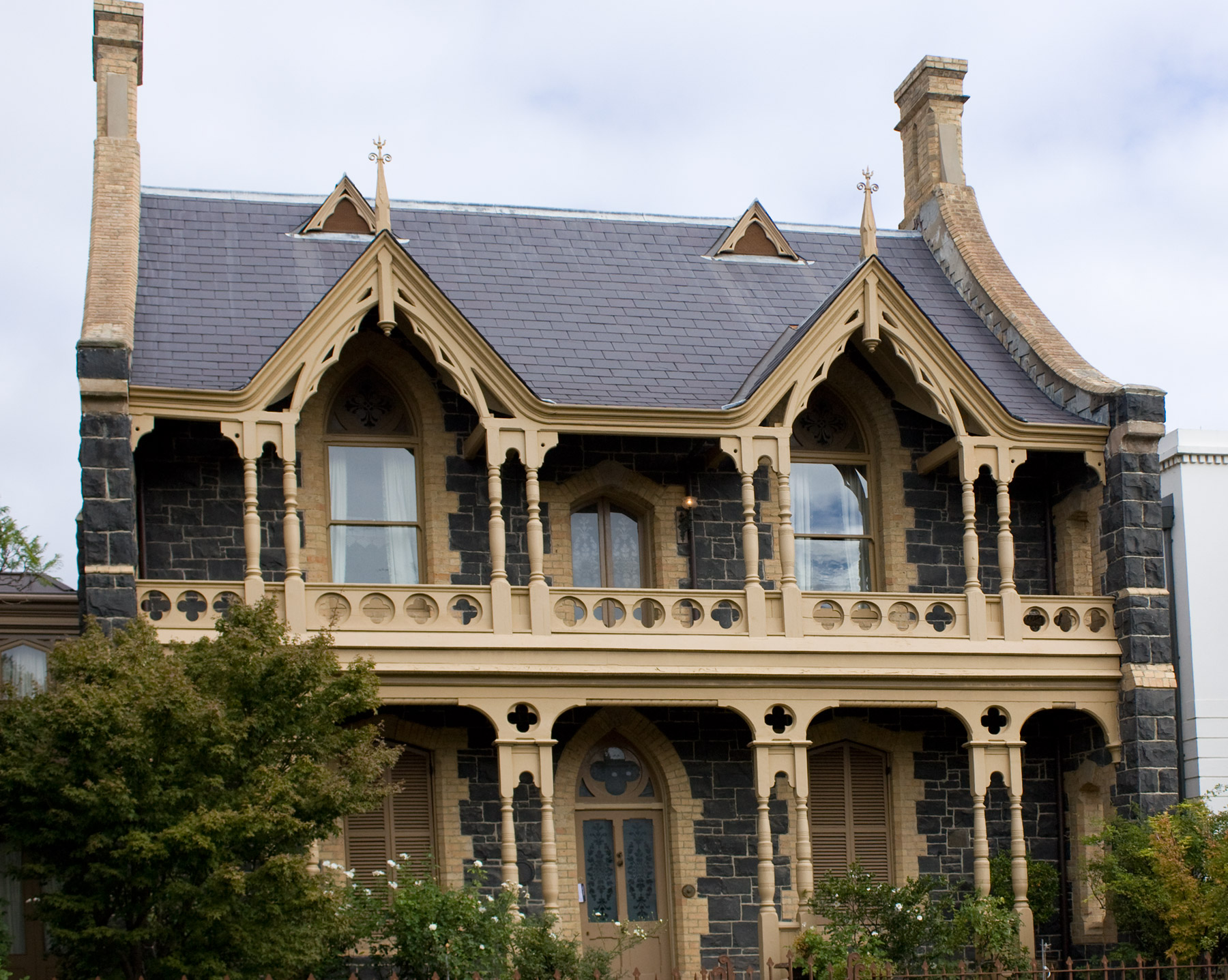
157 Hotham Street, East Melbourne (1861) Joseph Reed architect

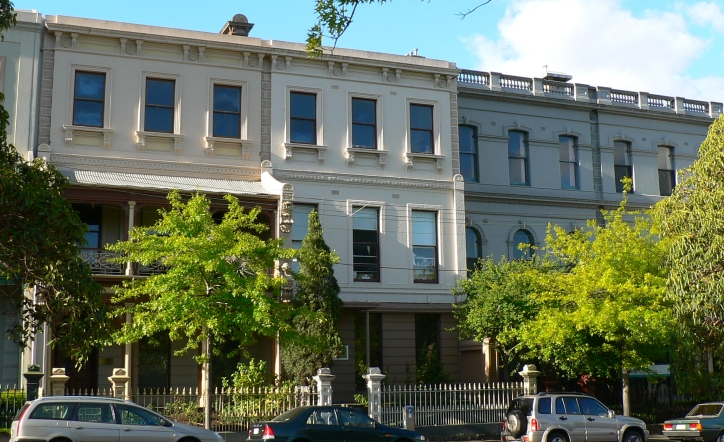
Three storey terraces 1870s

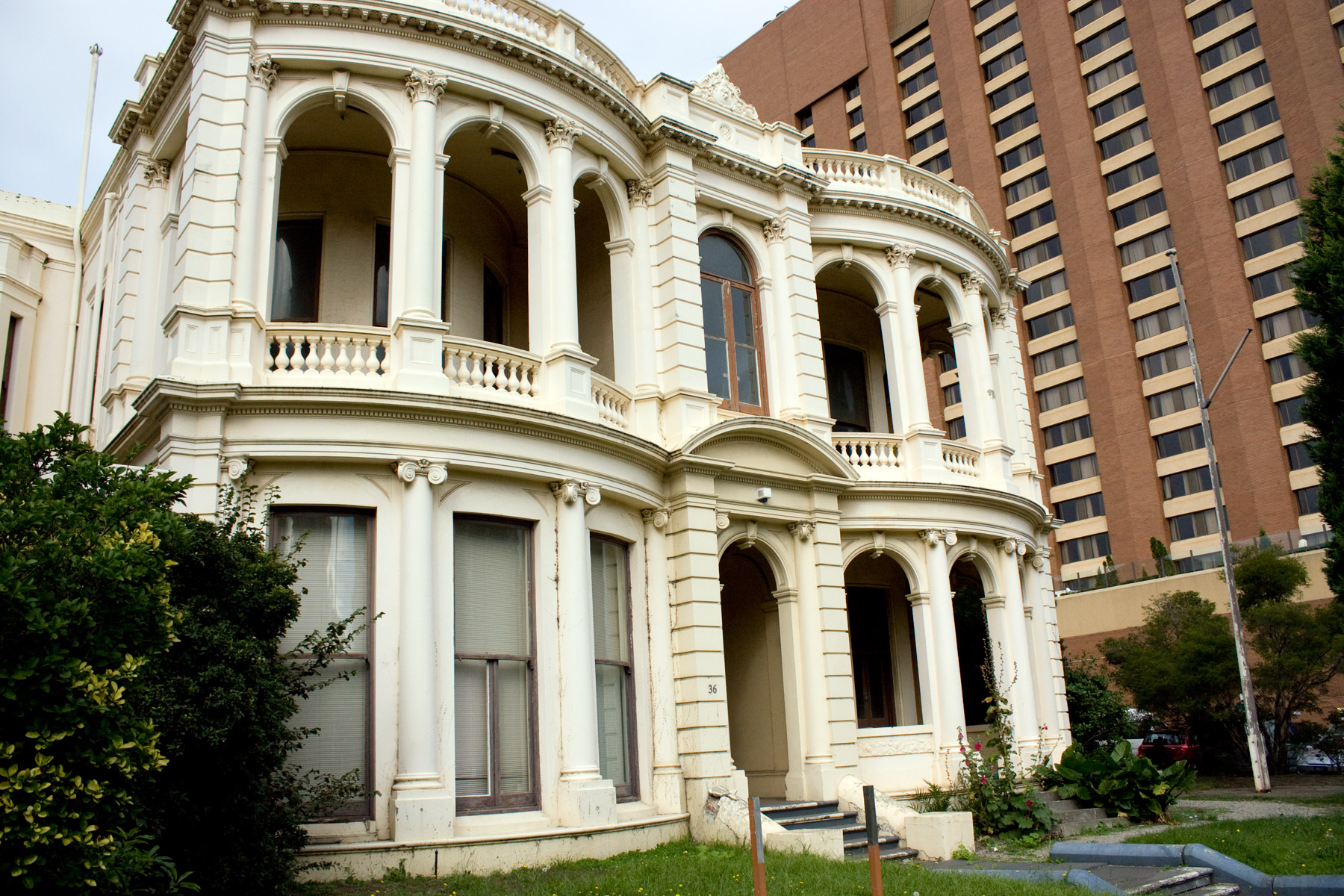
"Mosspennoch" (1881)

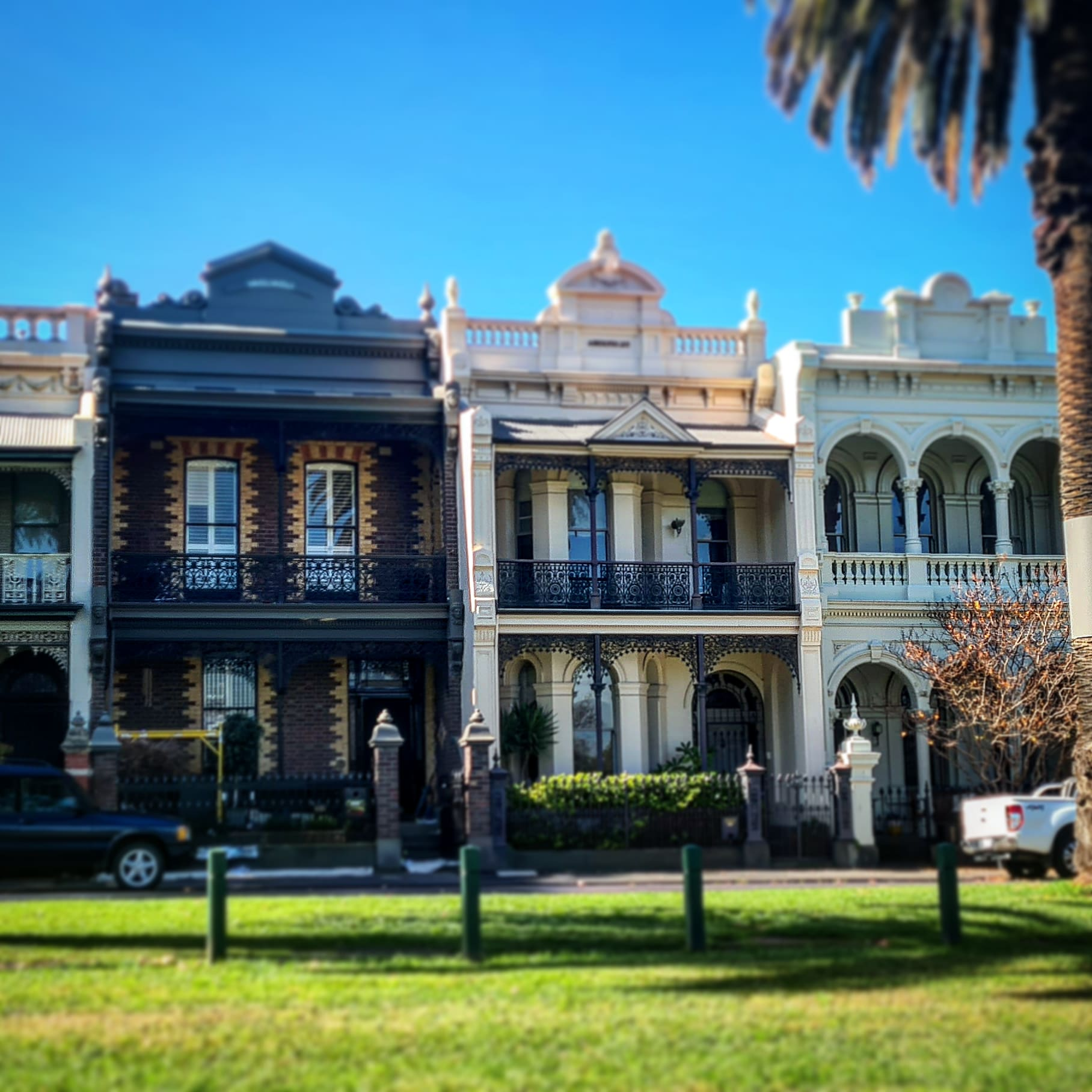
1880s terrace houses

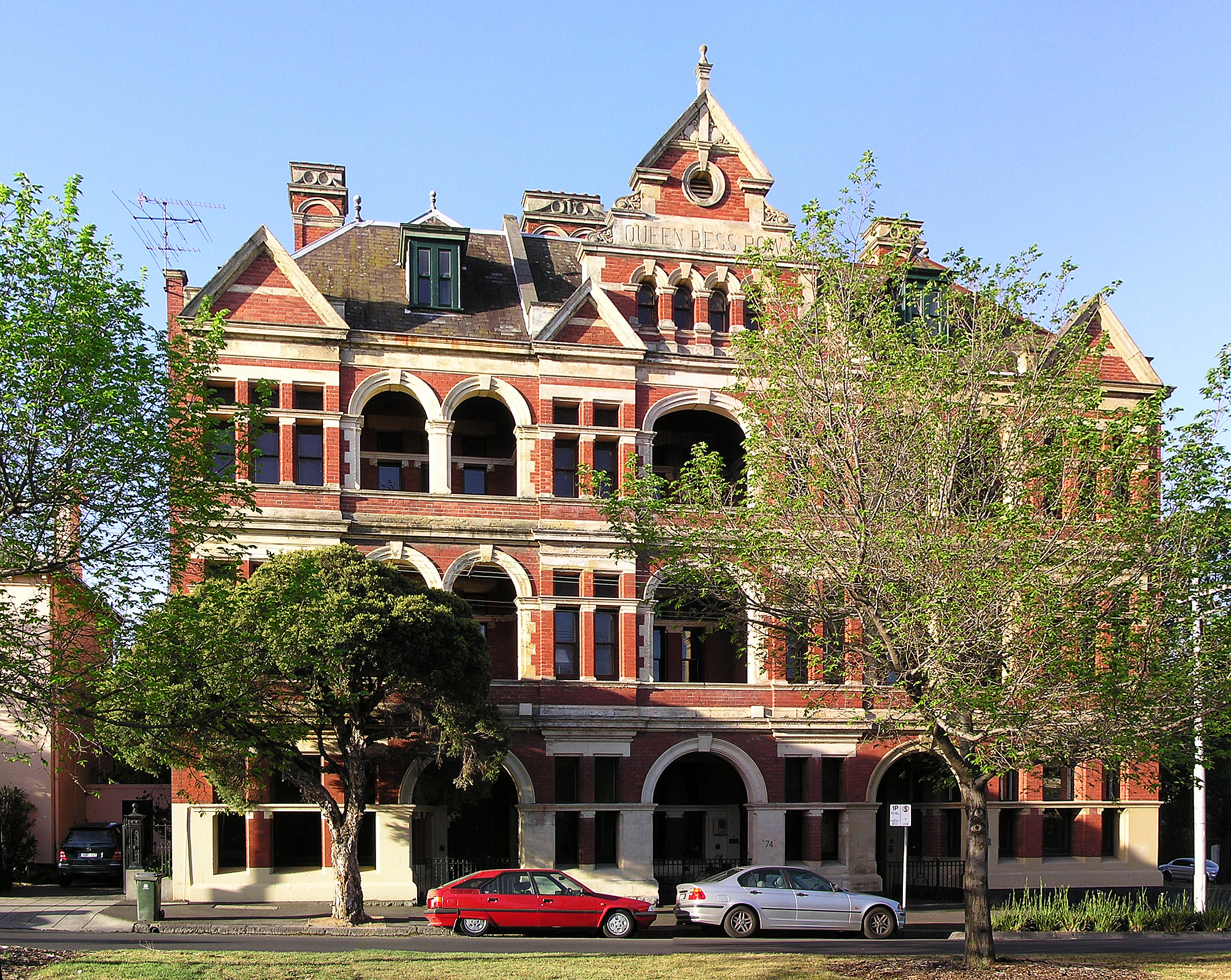
Queens Bess Row, East Melbourne (1886) Tappin Gilbert and Dennehy

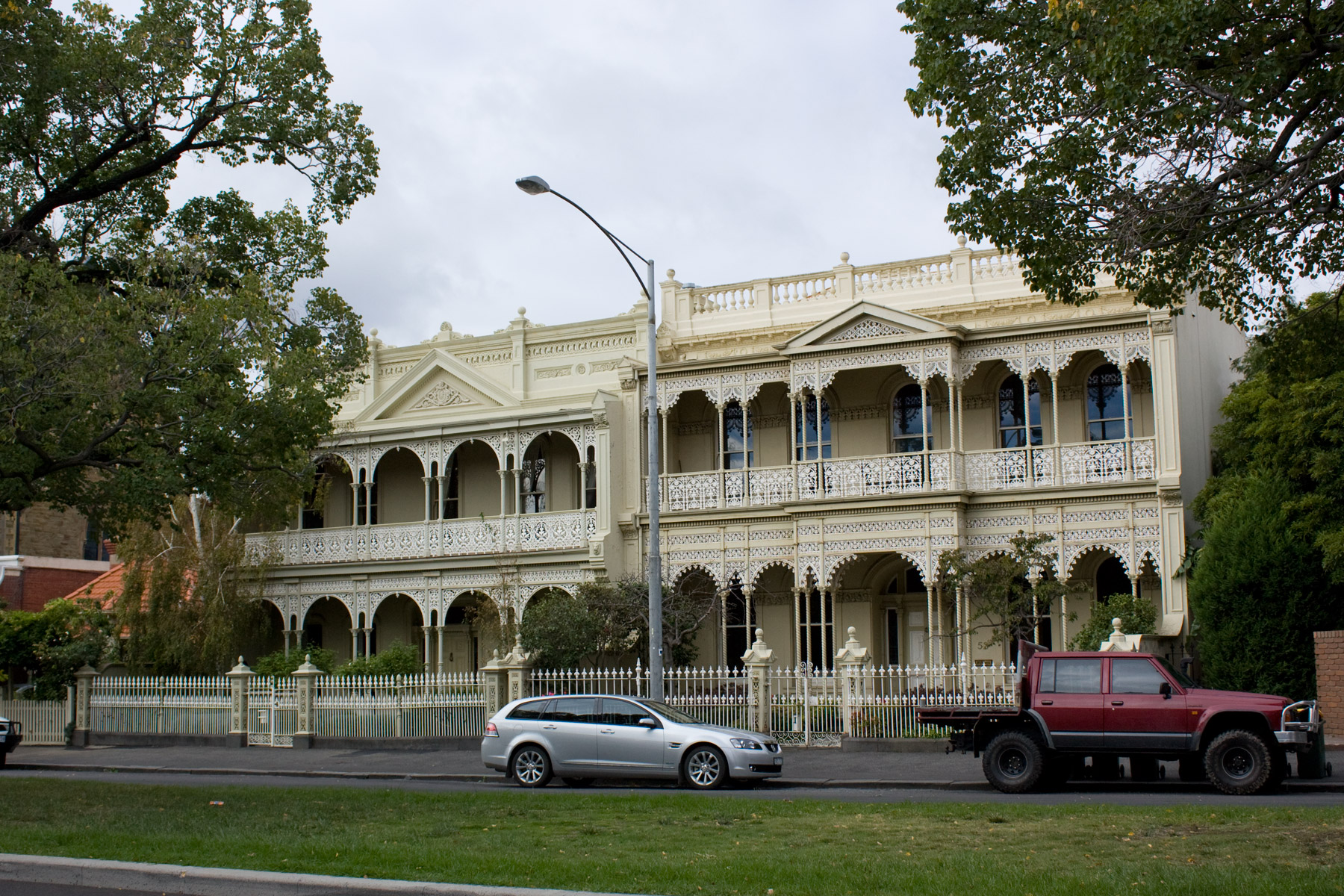
Eastcourt (1889-1890)

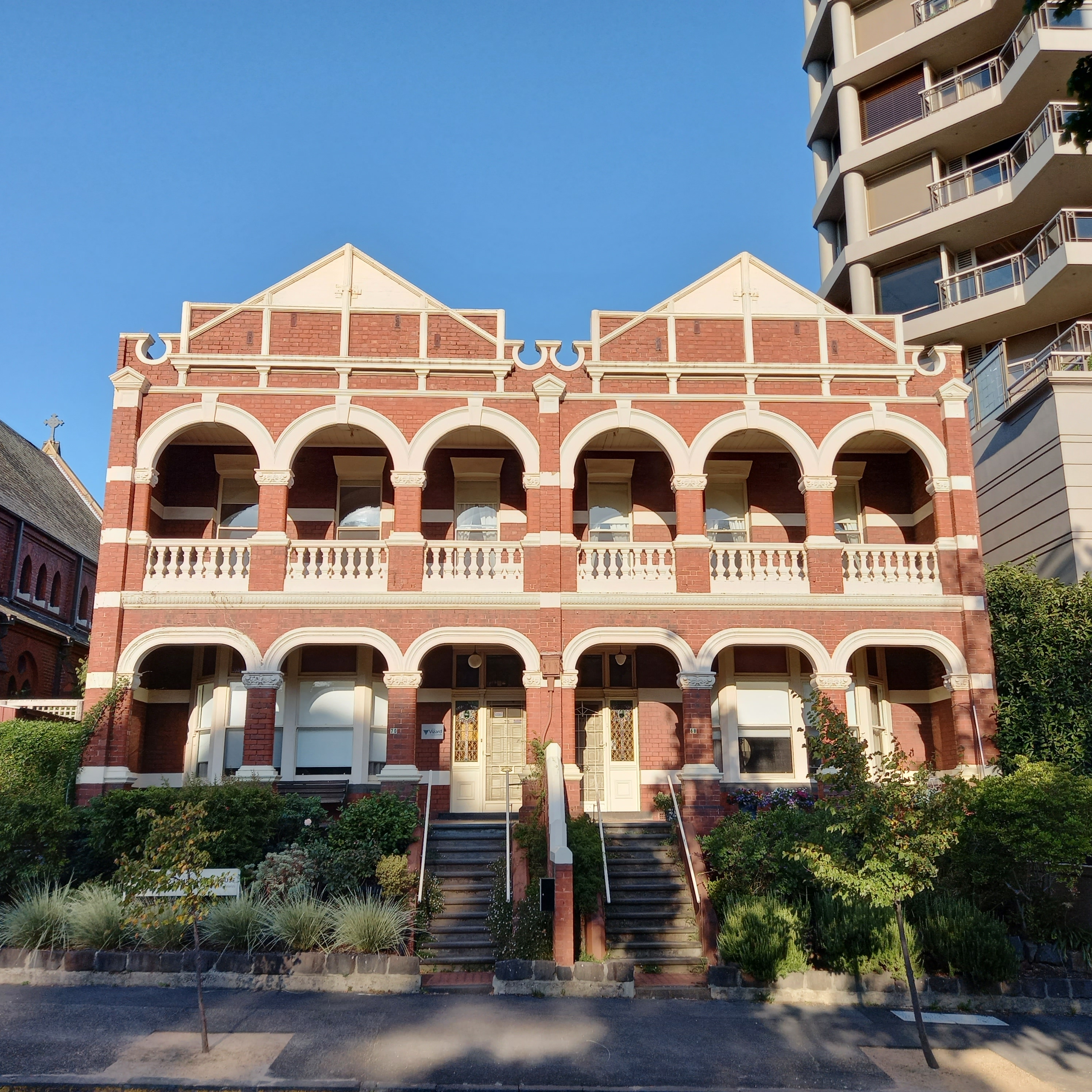
Terrace pair (1908)

=== Schools ===
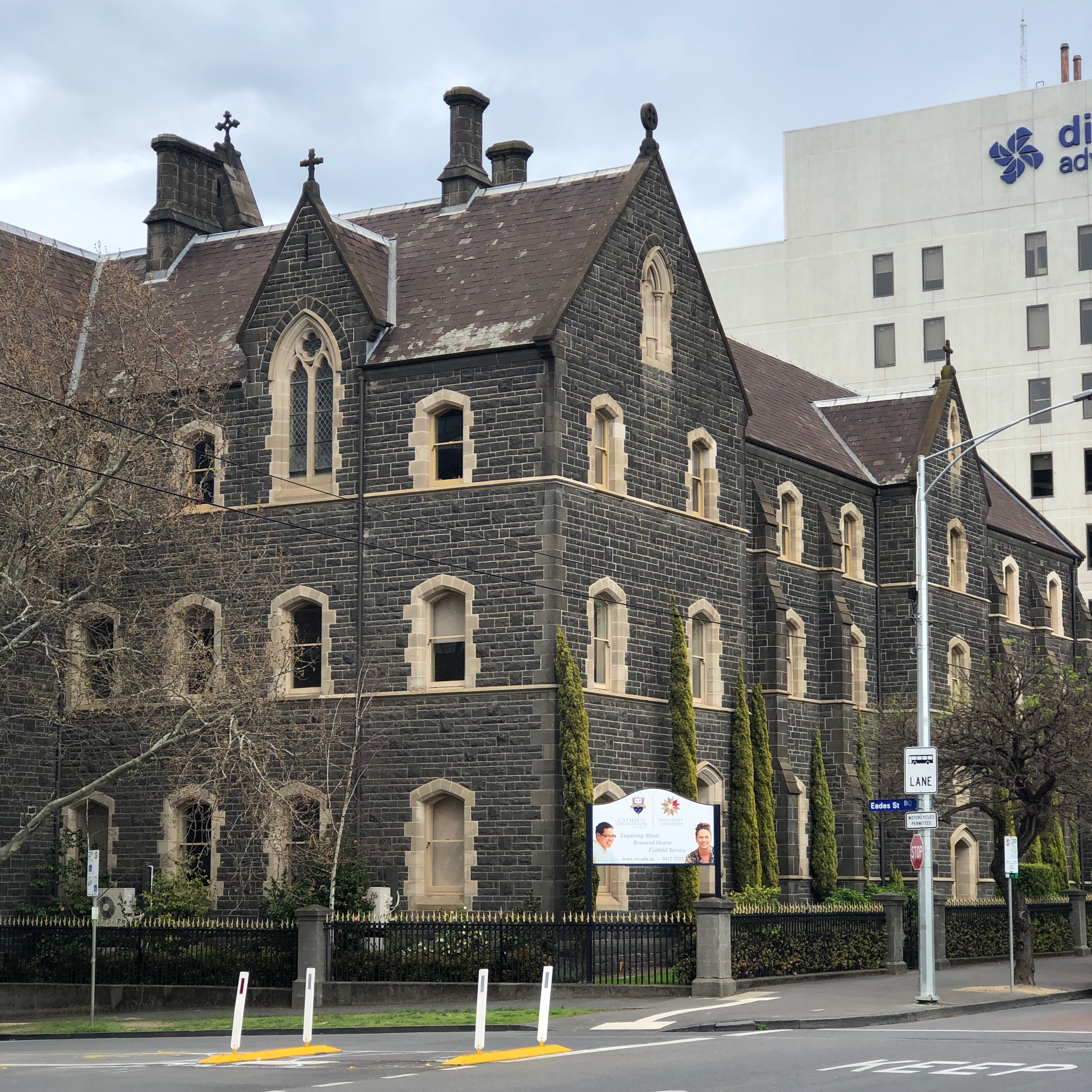
The Former Cathedral College building home of the Catholic Theological College.

Catholic Theological College is located in the former Parade College building.

Historically, East Melbourne was the original home to a number of prominent Melbourne's schools including: Scotch College, St Patrick's College, Cathedral College, St Kevin's College, Catholic Ladies College, Presbyterian Ladies' College, and Parade College.

=== Parks and public spaces ===
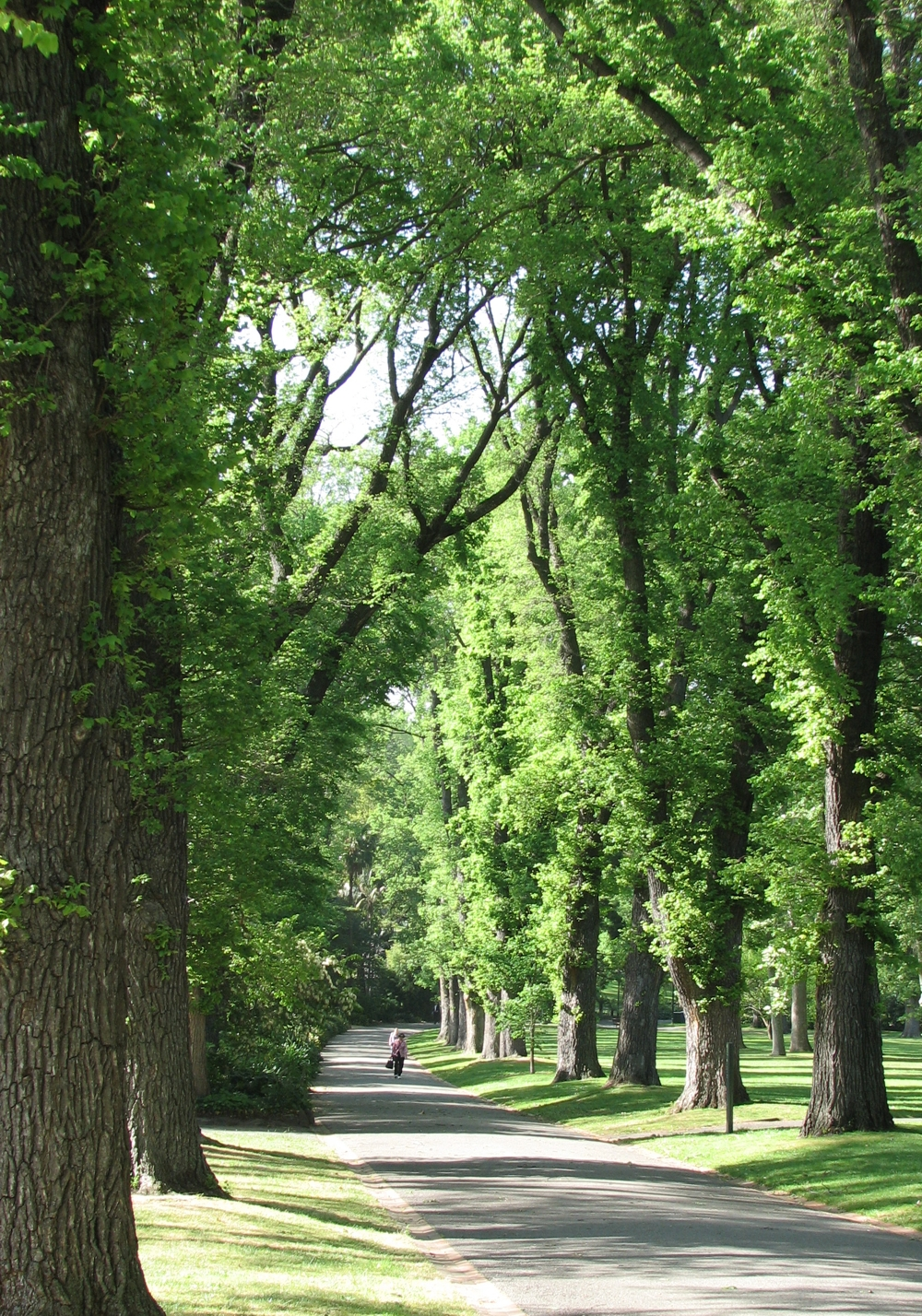
English Elm Tree avenue, Fitzroy Gardens

East Melbourne has many impressive Victorian era gardens with well-established plantings, the largest of which are the Treasury Gardens and the Fitzroy Gardens. Yarra Park in Jolimont is used for picnicking and, controversially, car parking for the MCG. Parliament Gardens, a small square with a fountain adjacent to Parliament House, was granted public space by the City of Melbourne in 1934 and a modern fountain feature was later constructed. Approximately 41% of East Melbourne is public parkland.

=== Demolished buildings ===
The Dallas Brooks Hall, one of Australia's finest examples of the "stripped classical" style, was completed in 1969 and has served as a major events venue for many years. The building caused controversy after 2001 when it owners, Freemasons Victoria announced that it was to be sold and demolished to make way for multi-purpose commercial development. Despite the building's architectural and cultural significance, its heritage protection status remains unknown. The building has since been demolished and is home to the Eastbourne Apartments.

The three-storey brick building known as Somerset House was constructed by A.B. Brook in 1914 at 92 (originally 495) Victoria Parade, opposite St Vincent's Hospital. It was funded by nurse Ethel Ragg (later Mrs Ethel M. Tymms) to be used as a hospital, initially known as Nurse (or Miss) Ragg's Private Hospital and owned by her until her death in 1936. In 1922 another nurse, Grace Wilson, took over as manager, and it became known as Somerset House until 1934, when it was renamed Gloucester Private Hospital in honour of the Duke of Gloucester who visited the city in 1934. After being offered for auction in April 1937, and passing in after it failed to achieve its reserve price, it was sold to the Sisters of Charity, and it was converted into a maternity hospital, called St Vincent's Maternity Hospital. It was reportedly demolished in 1975; however, there are a number of births reported in The Australian Jewish News after that date, up to at least September 1980.

== Transport ==
East Melbourne is served by major tramlines on Wellington Parade and Victoria Parade, both connecting with the CBD in the western edge of the suburb.

East Melbourne is also served by rail, with two main stations, Parliament underground station on Spring Street (part of the City Loop that runs underneath Melbourne) and Jolimont, on the Hurstbridge and Mernda lines, which is used primarily by patrons attending events at the MCG.

Punt Road and Hoddle Street, both on the suburb's eastern boundary, is a major road for bus routes in the area.

== Health ==
Due to its proximity to a number of hospitals, many medical practitioners also have their rooms in East Melbourne. These hospitals include the Royal Victorian Eye and Ear Hospital (RVEEH), the Peter MacCallum Cancer Centre and the Freemasons' Hospital.

In addition, St Vincent's Hospital and St Vincent's Private Hospital Melbourne are located in adjacent Fitzroy, after relocating from their original sites in East Melbourne.

== Localities within East Melbourne ==
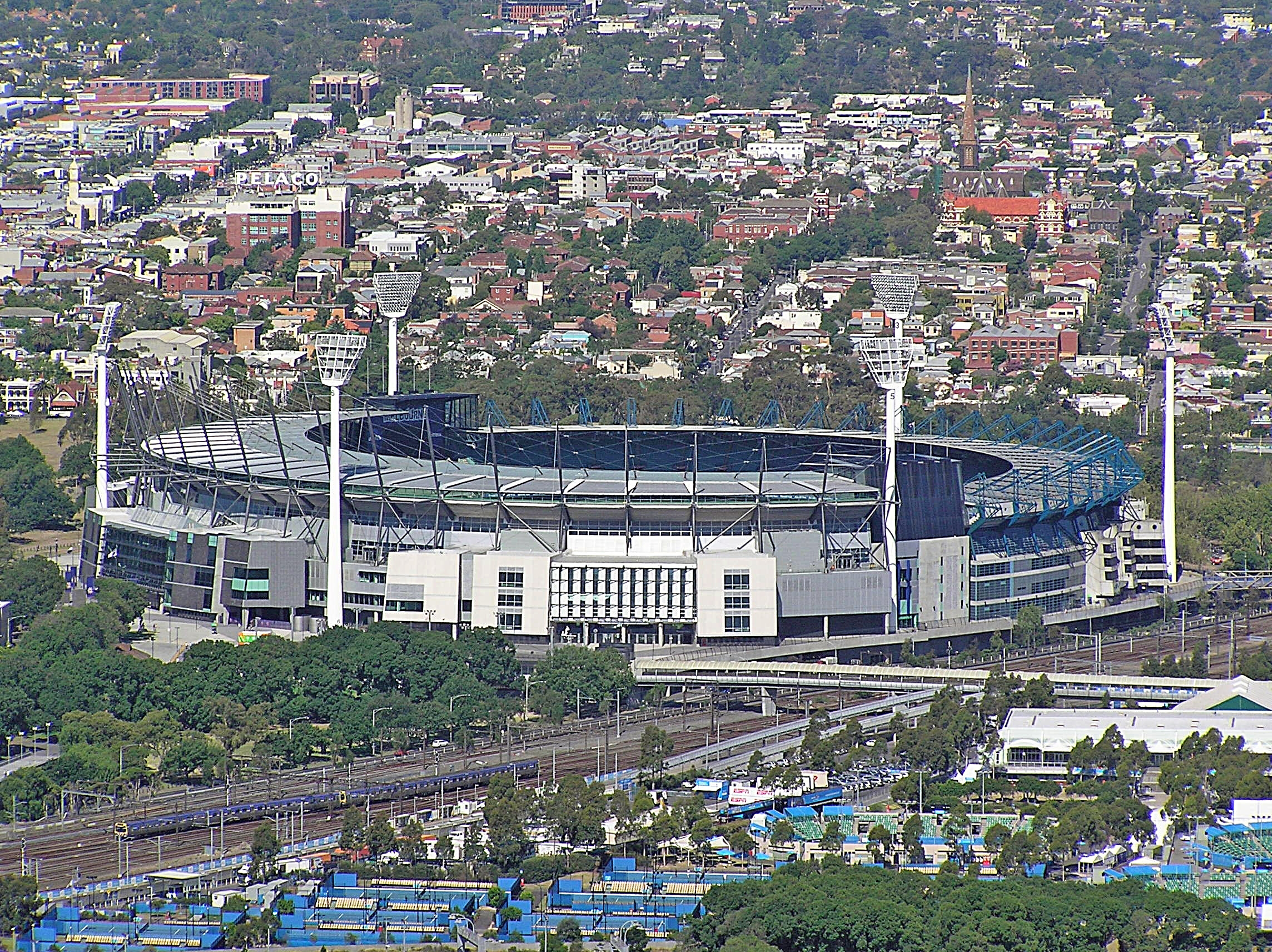
Looking toward the Melbourne Cricket Ground, Jolimont, Yarra Park, and beyond to Richmond from a CBD skyscraper

Jolimont is a locality within the suburb of East Melbourne.

Jolimont only covers a very small area. Most of it is occupied by the Melbourne Cricket Ground and surrounding Yarra Park and has its own railway station. The remainder of Jolimont is made up by a single block of housing, consisting of many Victorian terrace houses and office buildings.

The first superintendent of the Port Phillip District, and later lieutenant-governor, Charles La Trobe, lived in Jolimont with his family in a pre-fabricated cottage. The La Trobe's Cottage was moved in 1963 to the Kings Domain, where it is open to the public. Other notable people who have lived in Jolimont include William Guilfoyle.

== Notable residents ==
- Emma Carney, World Champion, Sport Australia Hall of Fame Inductee, Athlete Member
- Brian McGuire, racing driver
- Jade Melbourne, WNBA guard
- Jemima Montag, Olympic racewalker
- Ernest O'Ferrall, journalist and writer
- Ada Plante, artist
- Robert Ramsay, lawyer and politician
- Frederick Romberg, architect
- William John Young, biochemist, died in East Melbourne in 1942
