= Jolimont, Victoria =

Neighbourhood in Melbourne, Australia

Coordinates: 37°49′00″S 144°59′05″E

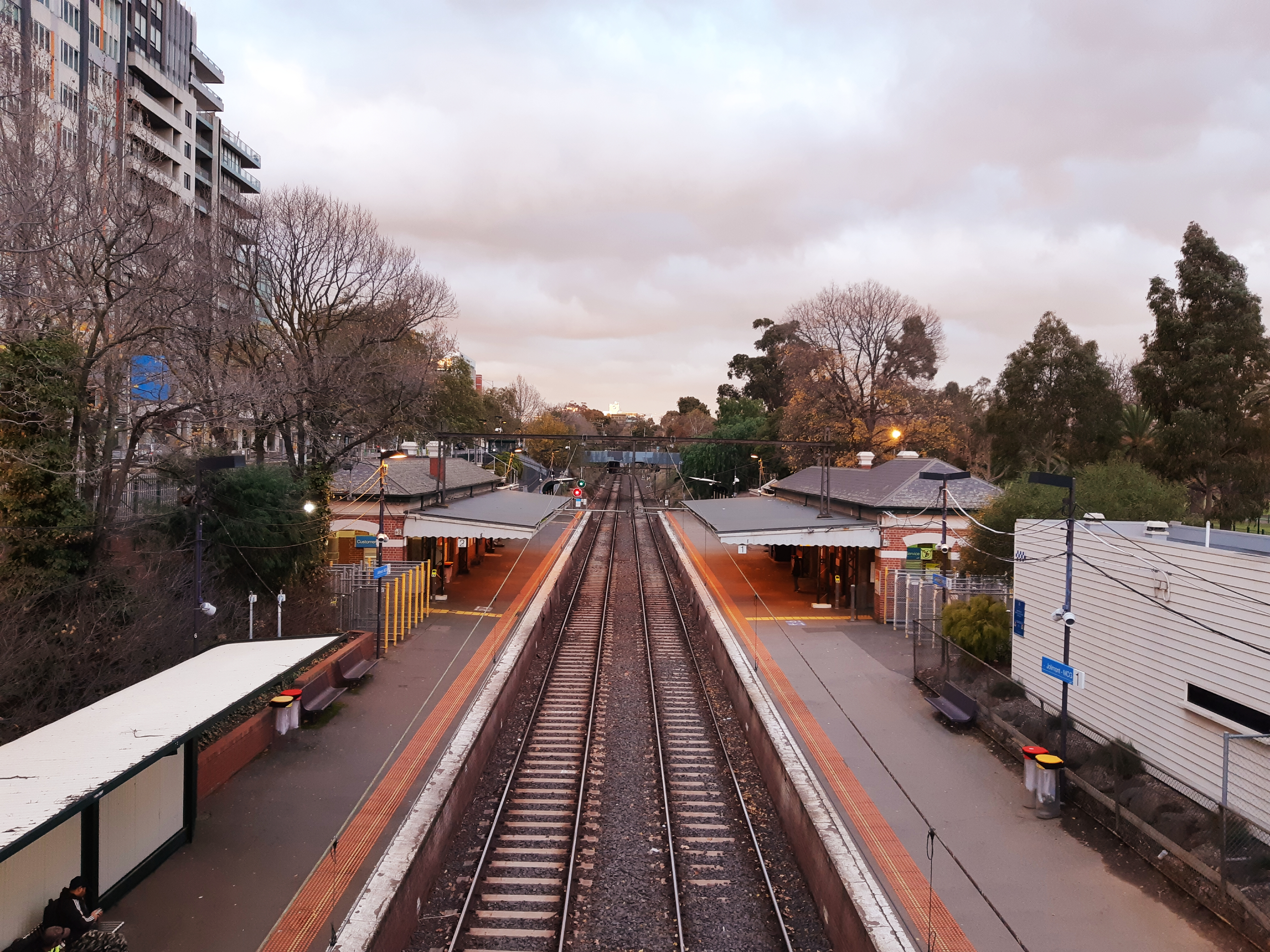
Jolimont railway station in June 2019

Jolimont is an unbounded neighbourhood of the suburb of East Melbourne, Victoria, Australia. Situated to the south east of the city's primary axis, Jolimont features parks, business precincts and a limited amount of residential accommodation. It was named after the Jolimont estate of Lieutenant-Governor Charles La Trobe, Victoria's first governor from 1839 to 1854.

== Melbourne Cricket Ground ==
Perhaps the main feature of the neighbourhood is the Melbourne Cricket Ground – or MCG as it is more commonly known – Australia's largest sporting venue and formerly the principal stadium for the 1956 Summer Olympics. The MCG is an iconic facility, famous worldwide and frequently used to distinguish Melbourne City in aerial photos and postcards.

== Railway station and yard ==
The ground is serviced by the Jolimont railway station on the Mernda and Hurstbridge lines, one of Melbourne city's smaller train stations. Jolimont also features the principal rail yards for Melbourne, a source of some controversy due to Melbourne City Council's long standing desire to cover the train tracks in this area.
