= Jolimont railway station =

Railway station in Melbourne, Australia

Jolimont
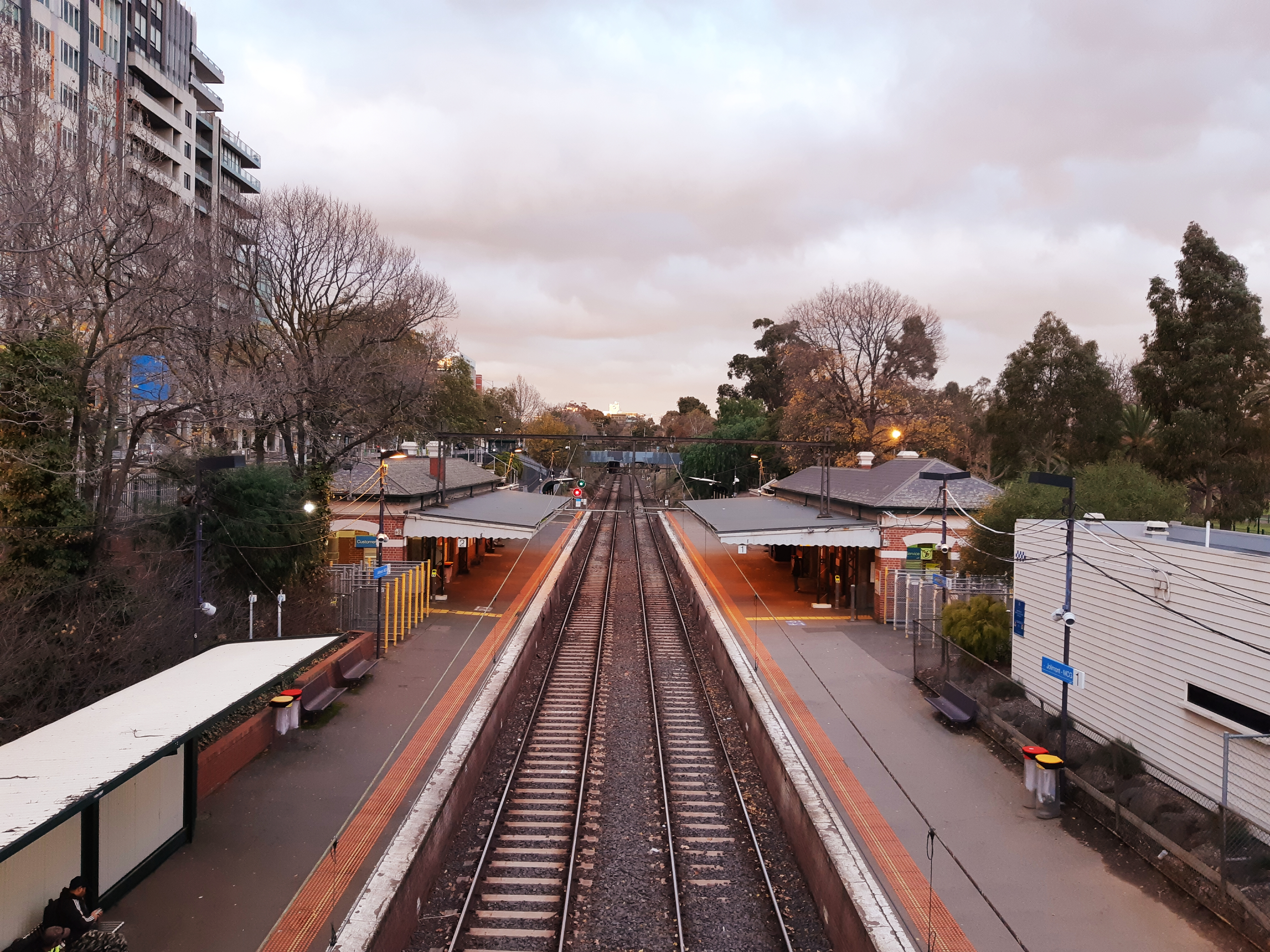
- Eastbound view of the station buildings and platforms, June 2019

General information
- Other names: Jolimont-MCG
- Location: Wellington Parade, East Melbourne, Victoria 3002; City of Melbourne; Australia
- Coordinates: 37°48′59″S 144°58′58″E
- System: PTV commuter rail station
- Owner: VicTrack
- Operator: Metro Trains
- Lines: Mernda; Hurstbridge
- Distance: 2.91 kilometres from Southern Cross
- Platforms: 2 side
- Tracks: 2
- Connections: Tram

Construction
- Structure type: Ground
- Accessible: Yes—step free access

Other information
- Status: Operational, host station
- Station code: JLI
- Fare zone: Myki zone 1
- Website: Public Transport Victoria

History
- Opened: 21 October 1901; 125 years ago
- Electrified: July 1921 (1500 V DC overhead)

Passengers
- 2005–2006: 488,931
- 2006–2007: 519,975 ▲6.34%
- 2007–2008: 564,525 ▲8.56%
- 2008–2009: 590,337 ▲4.57%
- 2009–2010: 618,841 ▲4.82%
- 2010–2011: 722,854 ▲16.8%
- 2011–2012: 756,993 ▲4.72%
- 2012–2013: Not measured
- 2013–2014: 802,590 ▲6.02%
- 2014–2015: 850,120 ▲5.92%
- 2015–2016: 922,543 ▲8.51%
- 2016–2017: 1,021,923 ▲10.77%
- 2017–2018: 1,031,754 ▲0.96%
- 2018–2019: 1,096,741 ▲6.29%
- 2019–2020: 787,850 ▼28.16%
- 2020–2021: 358,650 ▼54.47%
- 2021–2022: 473,600 ▲32.05%
- 2022–2023: 921,700 ▲94.62%

Services
Preceding station	Metro Trains	Following station
Flinders Street or Parliament towards Flinders Street	Mernda line	West Richmond towards Mernda, Eltham or Hurstbridge
Flinders Street or Parliament towards Flinders Street	Hurstbridge line	West Richmond towards Mernda, Eltham or Hurstbridge
Former services
Preceding station	MetRail	Following station
Princes Bridge Terminus	Epping line	West Richmond towards Epping, Eltham or Hurstbridge
Princes Bridge Terminus	Hurstbridge line	West Richmond towards Epping, Eltham or Hurstbridge
Track layout
Location

Jolimont station is a railway station operated by Metro Trains Melbourne on the Mernda and Hurstbridge lines, both part of the Melbourne rail network. It serves the inner-eastern suburb of East Melbourne, in Melbourne, Victoria, Australia. Jolimont station is a ground-level premium station, featuring two side platforms. It opened on 21 October 1901.

Jolimont is one of two stations that are close to the Melbourne Cricket Ground (MCG), the other being Richmond. During events at the MCG, extra exit gates are open to reduce crowding.

== History ==
Jolimont station opened on 21 October 1901, when a direct railway line was provided between Princes Bridge and Collingwood. Like the locality itself, the station was named after the French words 'joli mont', which translates to 'pretty mount' in English. The name was believed to have been given by the French-Swiss wife of Charles Joseph La Trobe, Victoria's first Governor. According to an edict laid down by William Clarke, who financed the station's construction in the 1860s, the station is not permitted to have any advertising material displayed.

The original timber station building was manufactured in England in 1899. In the late 1920s, it was sold and re-erected in Canberra, on the site of the present Jolimont Centre. After being damaged by fire, it was demolished in 1977.

In 1973, additional entrances and exits were provided. In 1985 the station name was changed from "Jolimont" to "Jolimont MCG", with new signs being made, though the original name was and is still used in most contexts.

In November 2015, extra shelter and seats were provided on both platforms.

== Platforms and services ==
Jolimont has two side platforms. It is served by Mernda and Hurstbridge line trains.

Jolimont platform arrangement
Platform	Line	Destination	Service Type	Source
1	Mernda line Hurstbridge line	Flinders Street	All stations	
2	Mernda line Hurstbridge line	Reservoir, Epping, Mernda, Macleod, Greensborough, Eltham or Hurstbridge	All stations and limited express services	

== Transport links ==
Yarra Trams operates two routes via Jolimont station:

- : North Balwyn – Victoria Harbour (Docklands)
- : Vermont South – Central Pier (Docklands)

== Gallery ==
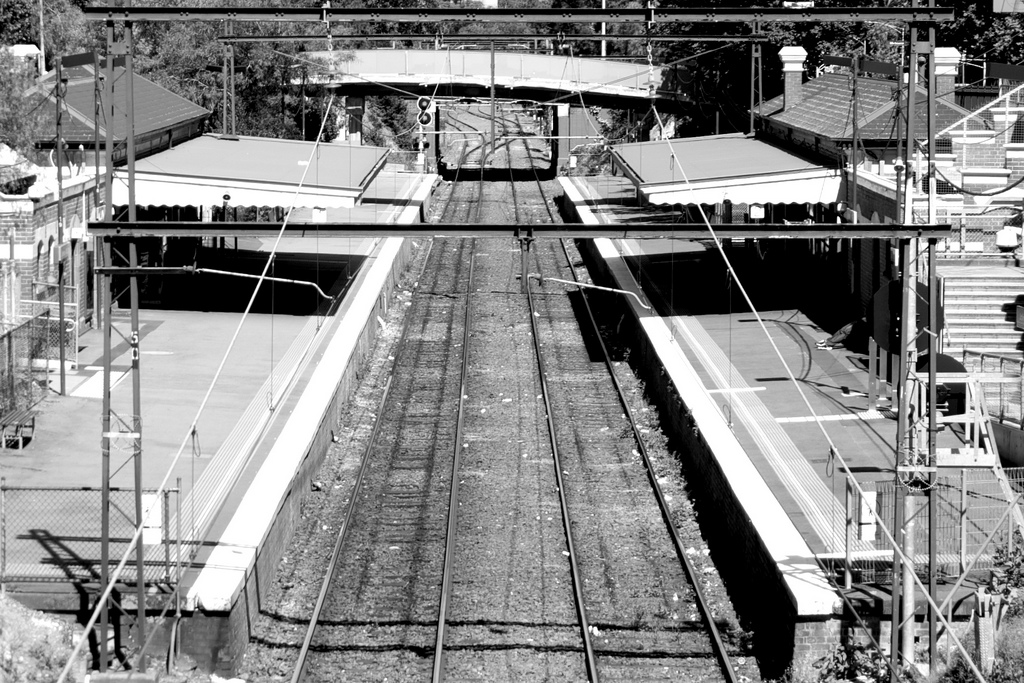
Black and white image of Jolimont station. Westbound view of Jolimont station platforms and buildings, February 2013

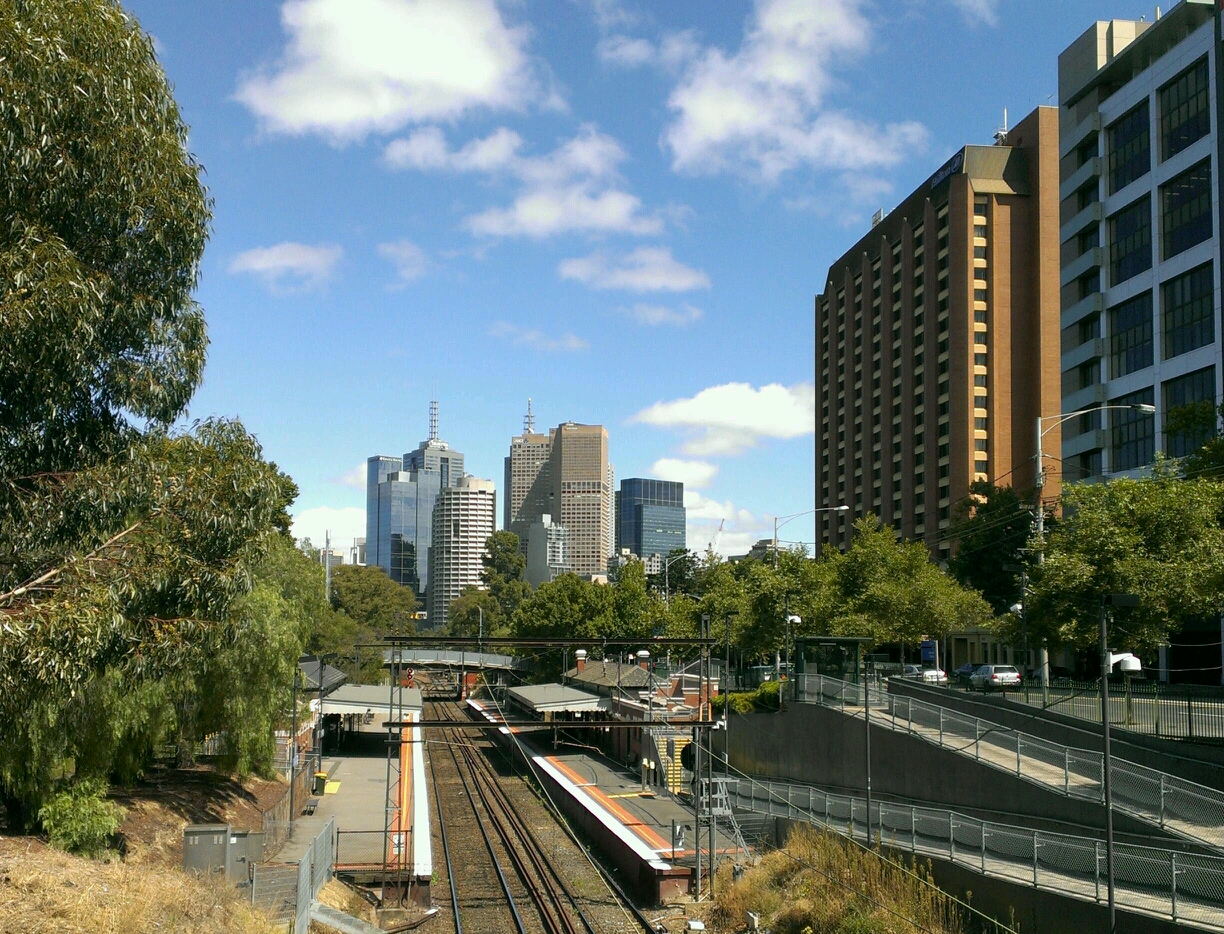
Westbound view of Jolimont station and platforms with views of Melbourne CBD, February 2013

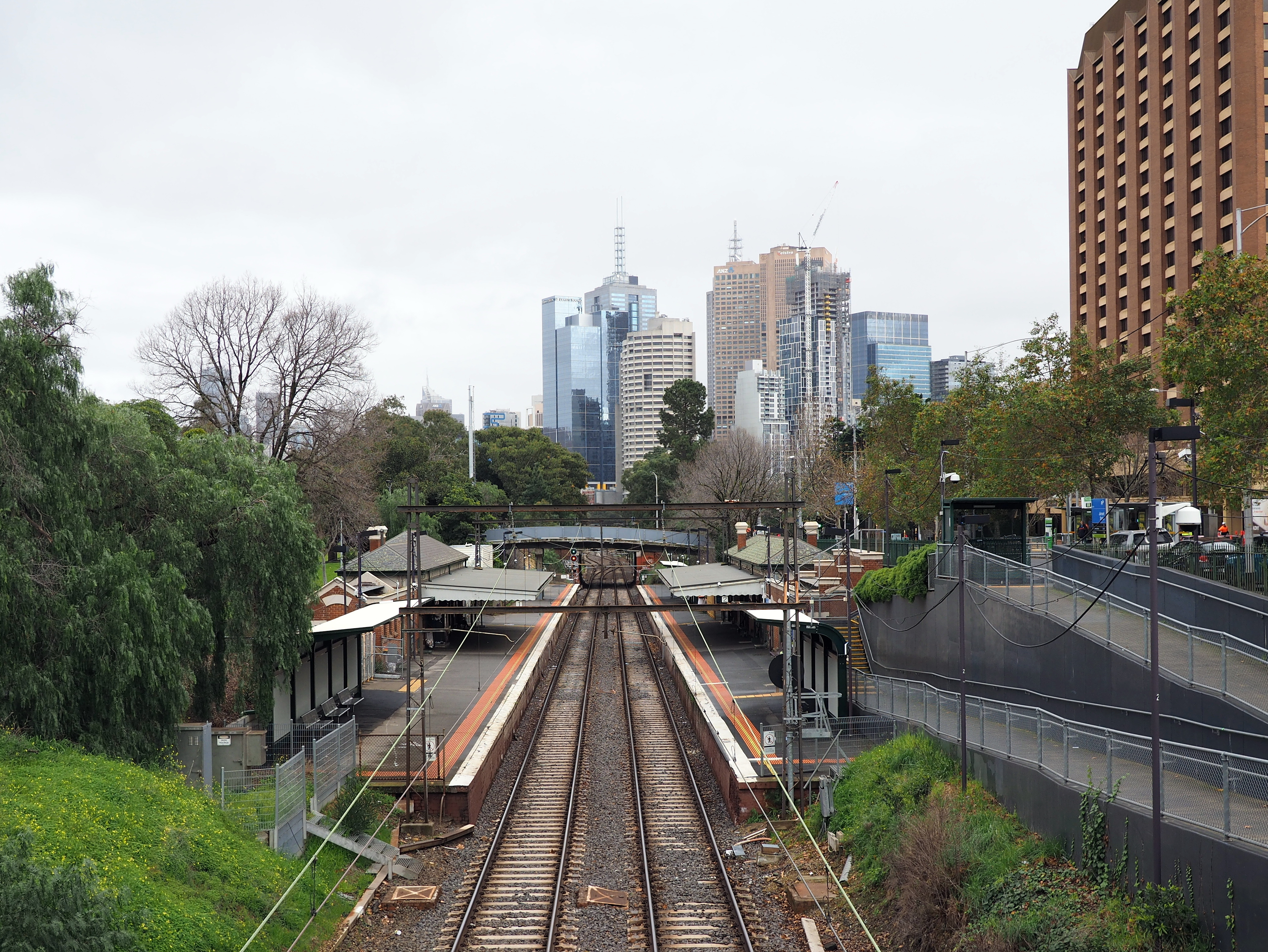
Westbound view of station platforms and buildings with partial views of Melbourne CBD, August 2016
