= Rosanna railway station =

Railway station in Melbourne, Australia

Rosanna
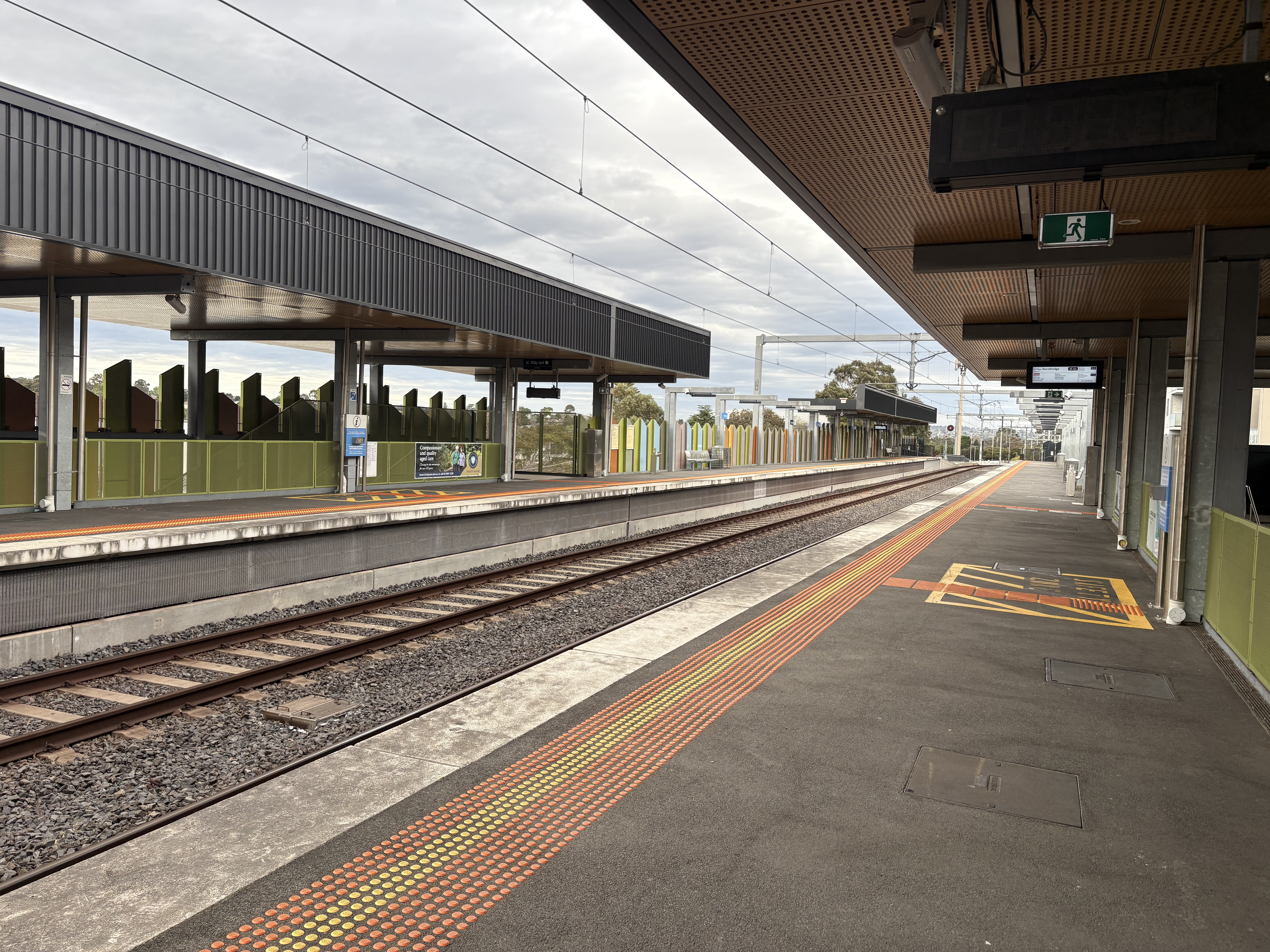
- Southbound view from Platform 2, September 2025

General information
- Location: Turnham Avenue, Rosanna, Victoria 3084; City of Banyule; Australia
- Coordinates: 37°44′34″S 145°03′58″E
- System: PTV commuter rail station
- Owner: VicTrack
- Operator: Metro Trains
- Line: Hurstbridge
- Distance: 15.80 kilometres from Southern Cross
- Platforms: 2 side
- Tracks: 2
- Connections: Bus

Construction
- Structure type: Elevated
- Parking: 241
- Accessible: Yes—step free access

Other information
- Status: Operational, unstaffed
- Station code: ROS
- Fare zone: Myki zone 2
- Website: Public Transport Victoria

History
- Opened: 1 October 1927; 99 years ago
- Rebuilt: 1975; 4 May 2018 (LXRP)
- Electrified: April 1923 (1500 V DC overhead)

Passengers
- 2005–2006: 376,473
- 2006–2007: 414,658 ▲10.14%
- 2007–2008: 466,991 ▲12.62%
- 2008–2009: 516,000 ▲10.49%
- 2009–2010: 558,000 ▲8.14%
- 2010–2011: 567,000 ▲1.61%
- 2011–2012: 524,000 ▼7.58%
- 2012–2013: Not measured
- 2013–2014: 531,000 ▲1.33%
- 2014–2015: 578,340 ▲8.91%
- 2015–2016: 704,281 ▲21.77%
- 2016–2017: 706,774 ▲0.35%
- 2017–2018: 259,850 ▼63.2%
- 2018–2019: 627,150 ▲141.4%
- 2019–2020: 552,500 ▼11.9%
- 2020–2021: 239,200 ▼56.7%
- 2021–2022: 293,550 ▲22.72%

Services
Preceding station	Metro Trains	Following station
Heidelberg towards Flinders Street	Hurstbridge line	Macleod towards Hurstbridge
Track layout
Location

Rosanna station is a railway station operated by Metro Trains Melbourne on the Hurstbridge line, part of the Melbourne rail network. It serves the north-eastern suburb of Rosanna, in Melbourne, Victoria, Australia. Rosanna station is an elevated unstaffed station, featuring two side platforms. It opened on 1 October 1927, with the current station provided in May 2018.

== History ==
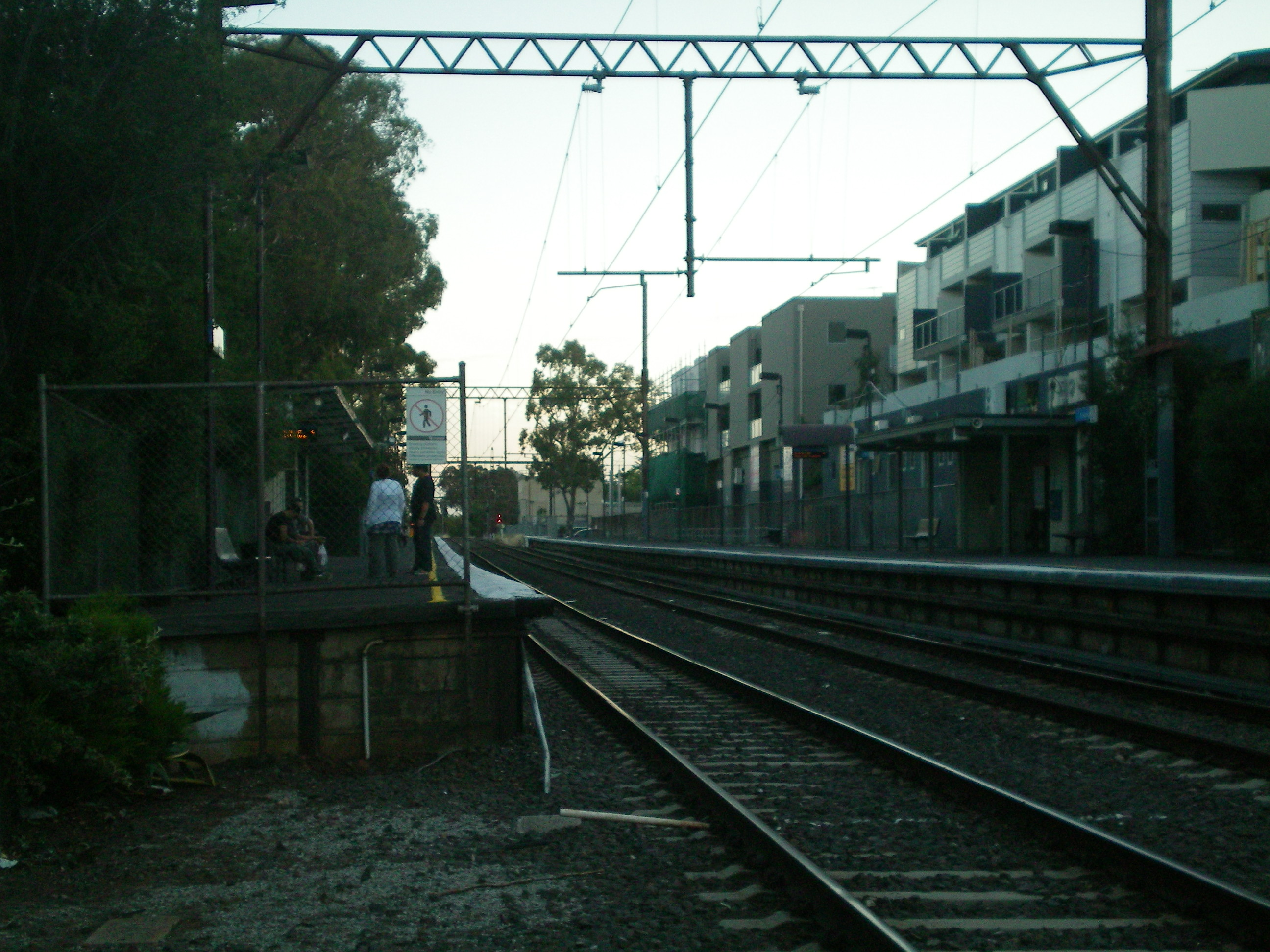
Southbound view of the former ground level station platforms, prior to the level crossing removal, January 2009

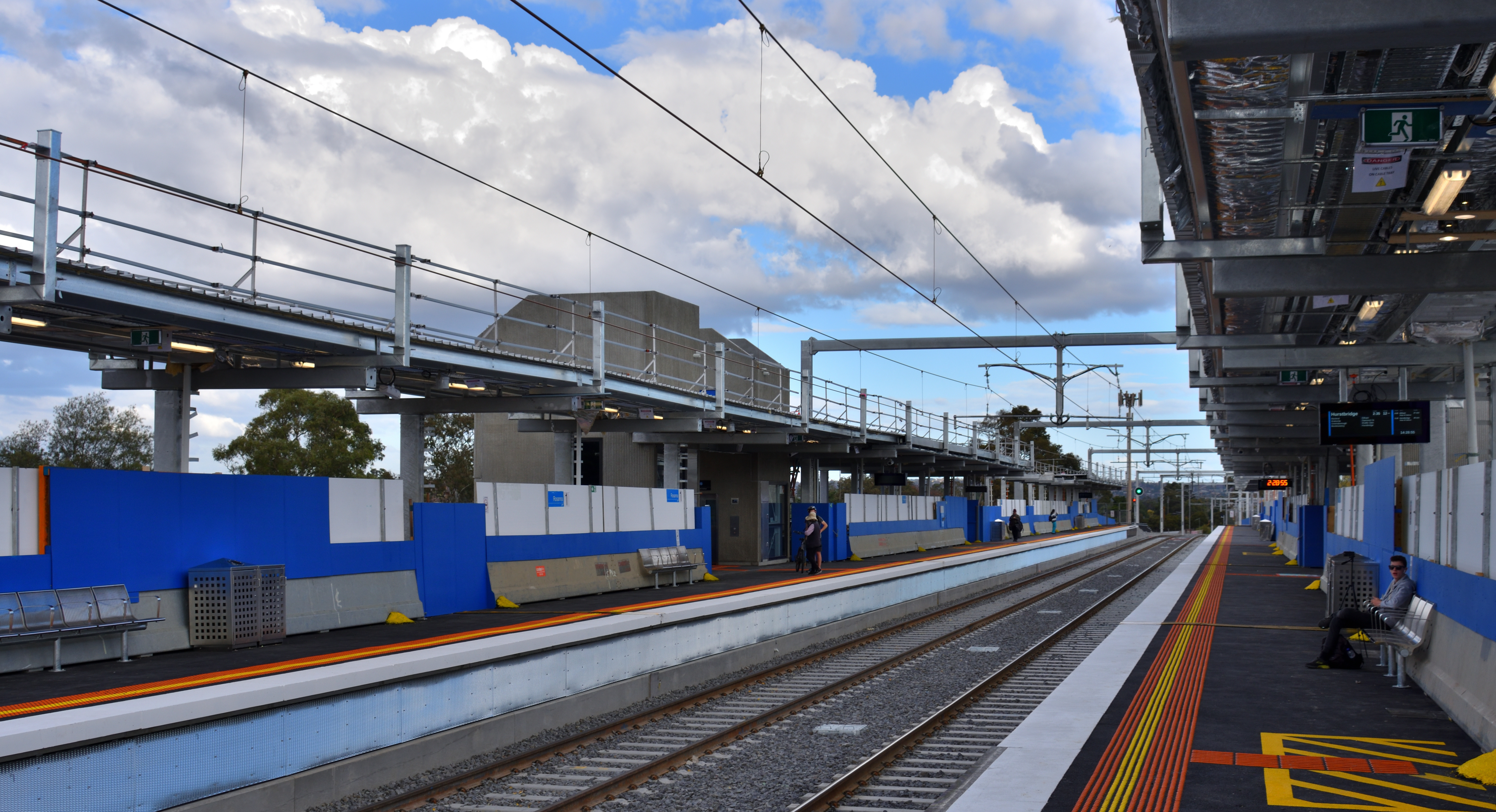
Southbound view from Platform 2, while station is still under shelter, decoration and electrical works, May 2018

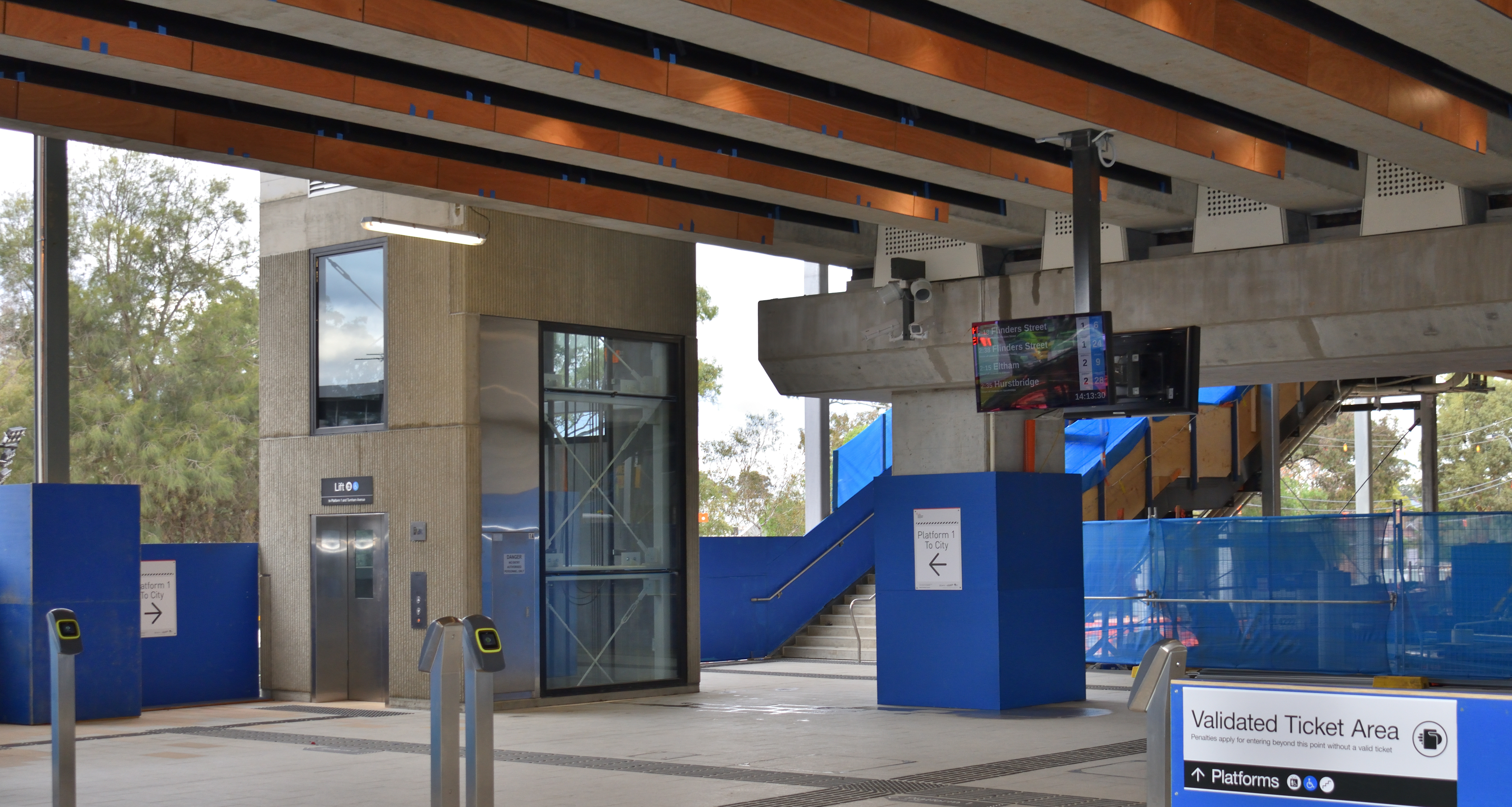
Station concourse and entrance, May 2018

Rosanna station, like the suburb itself, was named after Elizabeth Anna Rose, the wife of James Watson, who purchased land in the area in 1838 when the then Warringal village was divided in nine portions of varying sizes. Watson later named his land Rosa Anna Farm.

In 1958, in conjunction with the duplication of the line between Rosanna Junction (which was at the up end of the station) and Macleod, flashing light signals replaced wigwags at the former Lower Plenty Road level crossing, which was at the down end of the station. In 1972, boom barriers were provided. Three years later, in 1975, new station buildings were provided.

On 6 October 2017, the former ground-level station closed, as part of the removal of the Lower Plenty Road level crossing and the duplication of the Hurstbridge line between Rosanna and Heidelberg. On 4 May 2018, the new elevated station opened.

== Platforms and services ==
Rosanna has two side platforms. It is served by Hurstbridge line trains.

Rosanna platform arrangement
Platform	Line	Destination	Service Type	Source
1	Hurstbridge line	Flinders Street	All stations and limited express services	
2	Hurstbridge line	Macleod, Greensborough, Eltham, Hurstbridge	All stations and limited express services	

== Transport links ==
Kinetic Melbourne operates three bus routes via Rosanna station, under contract to Transport Victoria:

- 513 : Eltham station – Glenroy station (via Lower Plenty)
- 514 : Eltham station – Glenroy station (via Greensborough)
- 517 : Northland Shopping Centre – St Helena
