= Darebin railway station =

Railway station in Melbourne, Australia

Darebin
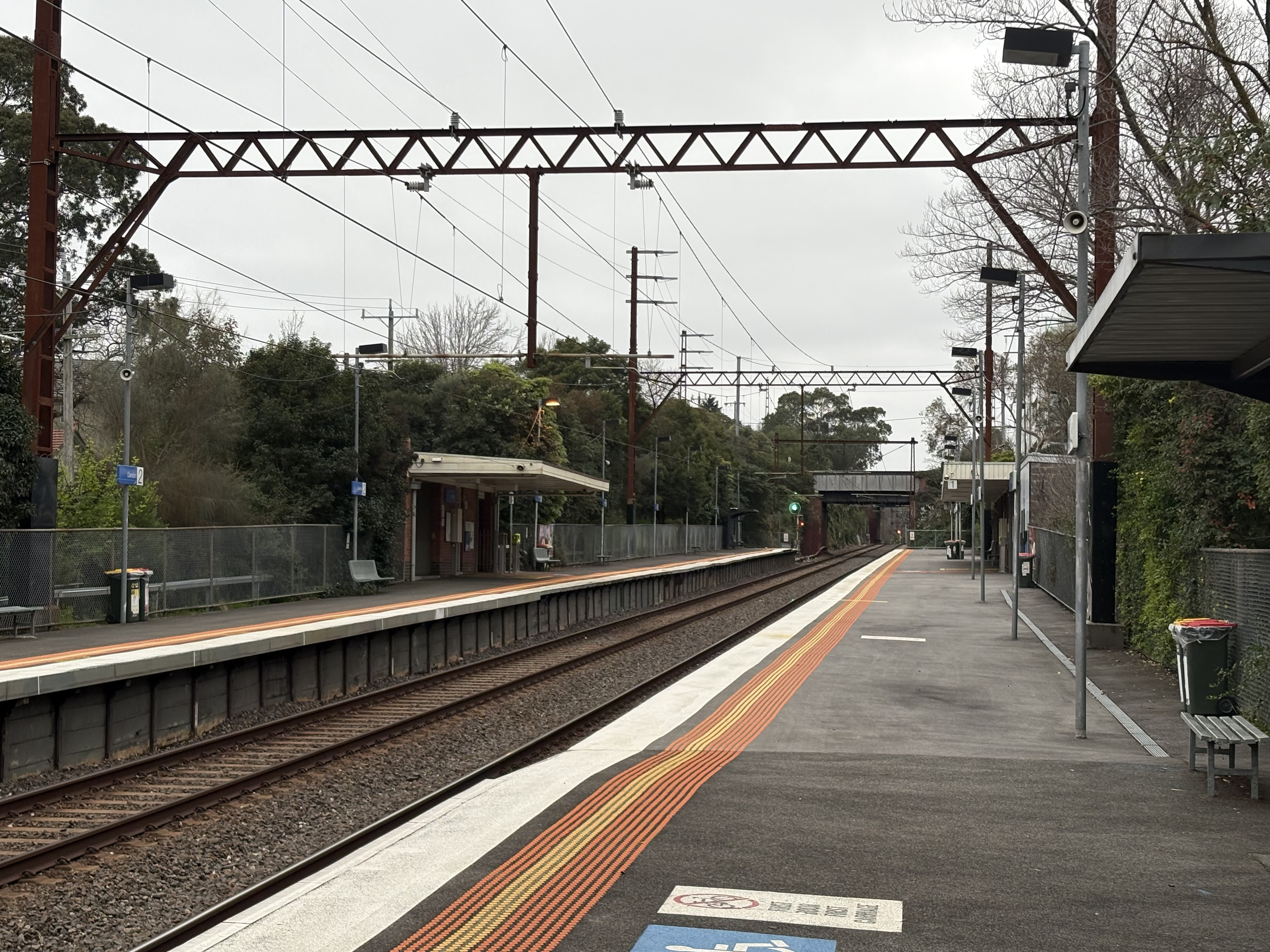
- Northeast bound view of the station as seen from Platform 1, August 2026

General information
- Location: Heidelberg Road, Ivanhoe, Victoria 3079; City of Banyule; Australia
- Coordinates: 37°46′30″S 145°02′19″E
- System: PTV commuter rail station
- Owner: VicTrack
- Operator: Metro Trains
- Line: Hurstbridge
- Distance: 11.22 kilometres from Southern Cross
- Platforms: 2 side
- Tracks: 2
- Connections: Bus

Construction
- Structure type: Ground
- Parking: 26
- Cycle facilities: 11
- Accessible: Yes—step free access

Other information
- Status: Operational, unstaffed
- Station code: DBN
- Fare zone: Myki zone 1
- Website: Public Transport Victoria

History
- Opened: 8 May 1922; 104 years ago
- Rebuilt: 1977/1978 FY
- Electrified: July 1921 (1500 V DC overhead)

Passengers
- 2005–2006: 140,380
- 2006–2007: 149,868 ▲6.75%
- 2007–2008: 156,480 ▲4.41%
- 2008–2009: 152,814 ▼2.34%
- 2009–2010: 158,054 ▲3.42%
- 2010–2011: 164,624 ▲4.16%
- 2011–2012: 156,567 ▼4.89%
- 2012–2013: Not measured
- 2013–2014: 138,344 ▼11.64%
- 2014–2015: 137,373 ▼0.7%
- 2015–2016: 151,011 ▲9.92%
- 2016–2017: 145,776 ▼3.47%
- 2017–2018: 129,853 ▼10.92%
- 2018–2019: 150,400 ▲15.82%
- 2019–2020: 118,850 ▼20.98%
- 2020–2021: 53,850 ▼54.7%
- 2021–2022: 60,500 ▲12.34%
- 2022–2023: 95,550 ▲57.93%
- 2023–2024: 102,800 ▲7.59%
- 2024–2025: 112,450 ▲9.39%

Services
| Preceding station | Metro Trains | Following station |
|---|---|---|
| Alphington towards Flinders Street | Hurstbridge line | Ivanhoe towards Hurstbridge |
Track layout
Location

Darebin station is a railway station operated by Metro Trains Melbourne on the Hurstbridge line, part of the Melbourne rail network. It serves the north-eastern suburb of Ivanhoe, in Melbourne, Victoria, Australia. Darebin station is a ground level unstaffed station, featuring two side platforms. It opened on 8 May 1922, with the current station buildings provided in 1977/78 FY.

Darebin is the eighth least-used station on Melbourne's electrified rail network.

== History ==
Darebin station opened on 8 May 1922, and is named after the nearby Darebin Creek and the locality of Darebin, which is located west of Ivanhoe. The name is believed to be an Aboriginal word for 'swallow'.

In 1951, the line between Alphington and Ivanhoe was duplicated. The present day Platform 2 was also provided in that year.

During the 1977/1978 financial year, the present station buildings were provided.

== Platforms and services ==
Darebin has two side platforms. It is served by Hurstbridge line trains.

Darebin platform arrangement
| Platform | Line | Destination | Service Type | Notes | Source |
|---|---|---|---|---|---|
| 1 | Hurstbridge line | Flinders Street | All stations | | |
| 2 | Hurstbridge line | Macleod, Greensborough, Eltham or Hurstbridge | All stations | Services to Macleod and Greensborough only operate during weekday peaks. | |

== Transport links ==
Kinetic Melbourne operates one bus route via Darebin station, under contract to Public Transport Victoria:

- 546 : Heidelberg Station – Melbourne University (Note: Route 546 services continue beyond Melbourne University to/from Moonee Ponds Junction as route 505.)
