= Dennis railway station =

Railway station in Victoria, Australia

Dennis
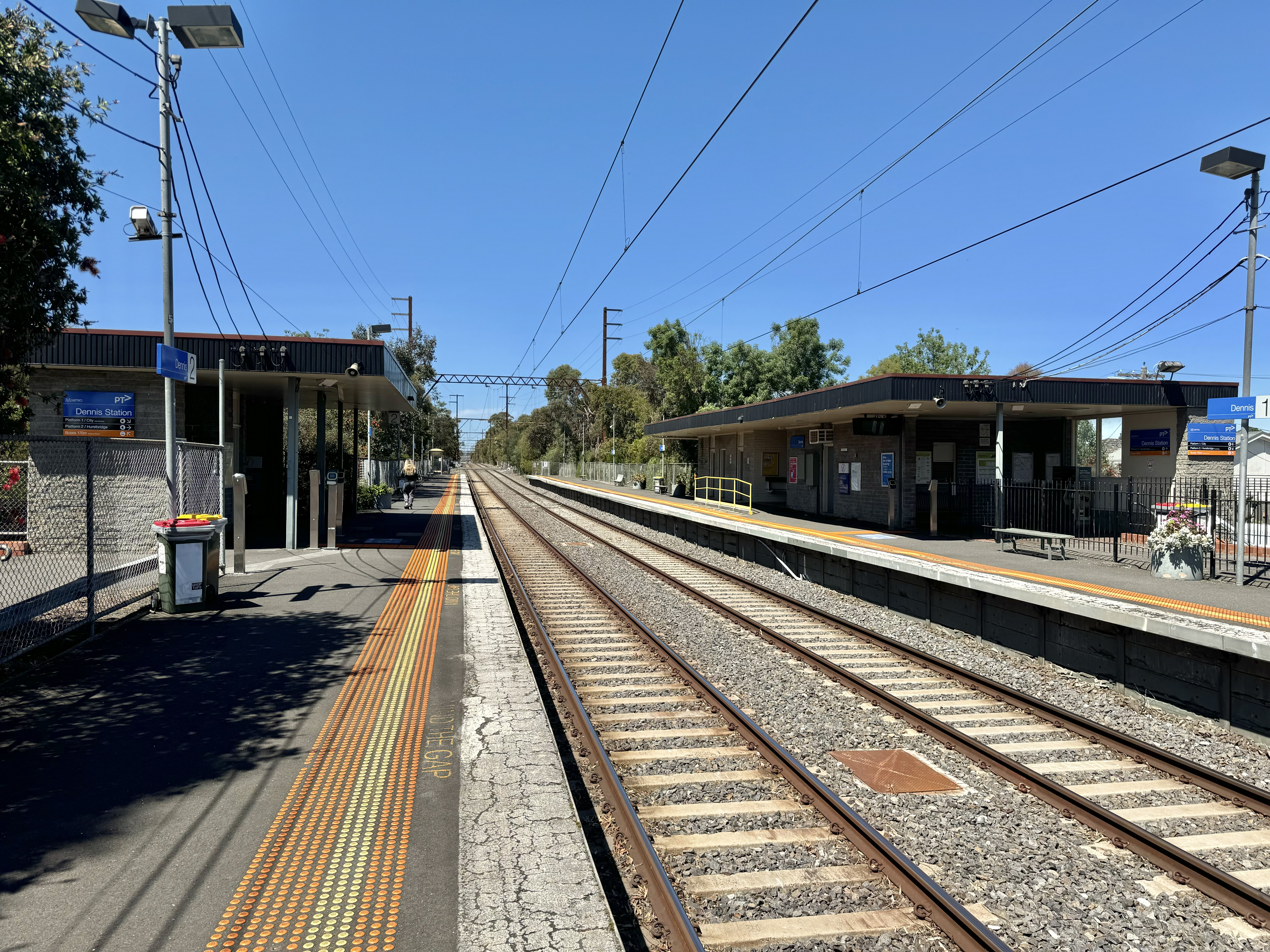
- Eastbound view from Platform 2, October 2024

General information
- Location: Cain Avenue, Northcote, Victoria 3070; City of Darebin; Australia
- Coordinates: 37°46′45″S 145°00′30″E
- System: PTV commuter rail station
- Owner: VicTrack
- Operator: Metro Trains
- Line: Hurstbridge
- Distance: 8.40 kilometres from Southern Cross
- Platforms: 2 side
- Tracks: 2
- Connections: Bus

Construction
- Structure type: Ground
- Parking: 36
- Accessible: No—steep ramp

Other information
- Status: Operational, unstaffed
- Station code: DEN
- Fare zone: Myki zone 1
- Website: Public Transport Victoria

History
- Opened: 4 February 1924; 102 years ago
- Rebuilt: 1979
- Electrified: July 1921 (1500 V DC overhead)

Passengers
- 2005–2006: 284,850
- 2006–2007: 302,277 ▲6.11%
- 2007–2008: 331,731 ▲9.74%
- 2008–2009: 350,707 ▲5.72%
- 2009–2010: 356,668 ▲1.69%
- 2010–2011: 381,523 ▲6.97%
- 2011–2012: 351,263 ▼7.93%
- 2012–2013: Not measured
- 2013–2014: 366,944 ▲4.46%
- 2014–2015: 379,267 ▲3.35%
- 2015–2016: 405,319 ▲6.86%
- 2016–2017: 394,520 ▼2.66%
- 2017–2018: 314,554 ▼20.27%
- 2018–2019: 389,350 ▲23.8%
- 2019–2020: 305,550 ▼21.52%
- 2020–2021: 118,700 ▼61.2%
- 2021–2022: 140,800 ▲18.61%
- 2022–2023: 223,750 ▲58.91%
- 2023–2024: 247,400 ▲10.57%
- 2024–2025: 260,800 ▲5.42%

Services
Preceding station	Metro Trains	Following station
Westgarth towards Flinders Street	Hurstbridge line	Fairfield towards Hurstbridge
Track layout
Location

Dennis station is a railway station operated by Metro Trains Melbourne on the Hurstbridge line, part of the Melbourne rail network. It serves the north-eastern suburb of Northcote, in Melbourne, Victoria, Australia. Dennis station is a ground level unstaffed station, featuring two side platforms. It opened on 4 February 1924, with the current station provided in 1979.

== History ==
Opening on 4 February 1924, Dennis station is named after Northcote councillor William Dennis, a member of the council for over 40 years.

In 1964, boom barriers replaced hand-operated gates at the Victoria Road level crossing, located nearby in the down direction of the station.

In 1979, the current station buildings were provided.

== Platforms and services ==
Dennis has two side platforms. It is served by Hurstbridge line trains.

Dennis platform arrangement
Platform	Line	Destination	Service Type	Source
1	Hurstbridge line	Flinders Street	All stations and limited express services	
2	Hurstbridge line	Macleod, Greensborough, Eltham or Hurstbridge	All stations and limited express services	

== Transport links ==
Kinetic Melbourne operates two bus routes via Dennis station, under contract to Public Transport Victoria:

- 250 : Queen Street (Melbourne CBD) – La Trobe University Bundoora campus
- 251 : Queen Street (Melbourne CBD) – Northland Shopping Centre
