= Alphington =

Places called Alphington include:

- Alphington, Devon, England
- Alphington, Victoria, Australia
  - Alphington railway station
