= Watsonia railway station =

Railway station in Melbourne, Australia

Watsonia
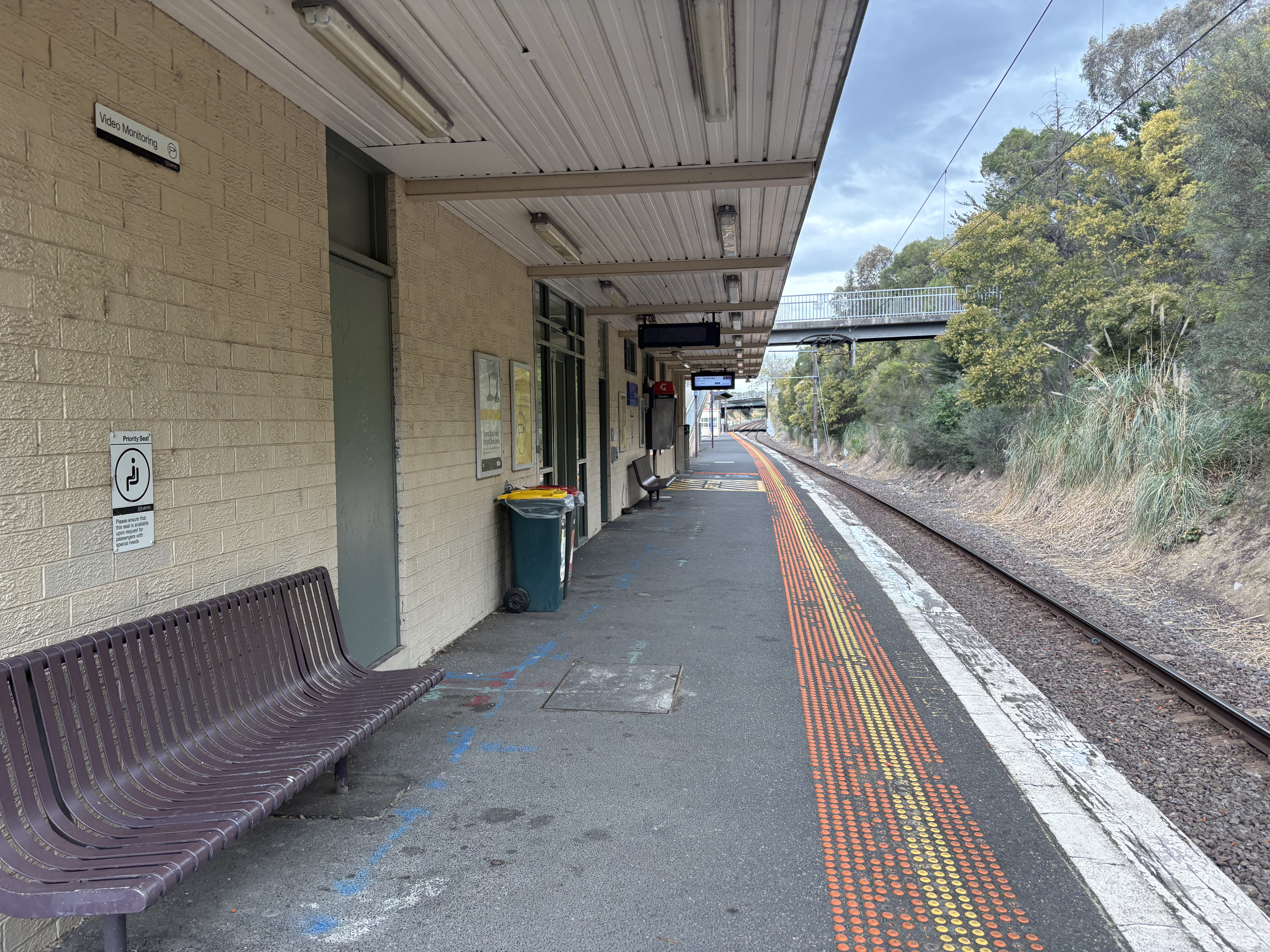
- Southbound view from Platform 2, September 2025

General information
- Location: Greensborough Highway, Watsonia, Victoria 3087; City of Banyule; Australia
- Coordinates: 37°42′40″S 145°05′02″E
- System: PTV commuter rail station
- Owner: VicTrack
- Operator: Metro Trains
- Line: Hurstbridge
- Distance: 19.92 kilometres from Southern Cross
- Platforms: 2 (1 island)
- Tracks: 2
- Connections: Bus; SkyBus

Construction
- Structure type: Ground
- Parking: 350
- Accessible: No—steep ramp

Other information
- Status: Operational, premium station
- Station code: WAT
- Fare zone: Myki zone 2
- Website: Public Transport Victoria

History
- Opened: 23 June 1924; 102 years ago
- Rebuilt: 20 June 1976 (Temporary station); 11 December 1977
- Electrified: April 1923 (1500 V DC overhead)
- Former names: Collina (during construction)

Passengers
- 2005–2006: 510,050
- 2006–2007: 527,193 ▲3.36%
- 2007–2008: 578,149 ▲9.66%
- 2008–2009: 598,000 ▲3.43%
- 2009–2010: 632,000 ▲5.69%
- 2010–2011: 655,000 ▲3.64%
- 2011–2012: 619,000 ▼5.5%
- 2012–2013: Not measured
- 2013–2014: 669,000 ▲8.08%
- 2014–2015: 643,585 ▼3.79%
- 2015–2016: 710,845 ▲10.45%
- 2016–2017: 711,914 ▲0.15%
- 2017–2018: 614,113 ▼13.74%
- 2018–2019: 715,500 ▲16.5%
- 2019–2020: 577,000 ▼19.36%
- 2020–2021: 242,150 ▼58%
- 2021–2022: 303,800 ▲25.45%

Services
Preceding station	Metro Trains	Following station
Macleod towards Flinders Street	Hurstbridge line	Greensborough towards Hurstbridge
Track layout
Location

Watsonia station is a railway station operated by Metro Trains Melbourne on the Hurstbridge line, part of the Melbourne rail network. It serves the north-eastern suburb of Watsonia, in Melbourne, Victoria, Australia. Watsonia station is a ground level unstaffed station, featuring an island platform. It opened on 23 June 1924, with the current station provided in 1977.

== History ==
Watsonia station was provisionally known as Collina during construction. Like the suburb itself, the station is named after Frank Watson, a local landowner who subdivided his property, Grace Park, into the Grace Park Station Estate.

On 19 June 1976, the original station was closed and demolished with a temporary alignment and station provided while construction works on a lowered line and station were taking place. The temporary station opened the next morning on.

The new Watsonia station opened on 11 December 1977 in a cutting in order to remove level crossings at Watsonia Road, Grimshaw Street and Williams Street. Upon opening of the cutting the temporary alignment was dismantled with the temporary station demolished. However initially, only a single platform (the present day platform 2) was completed with the line remaining single track until duplication works were completed from Macleod to Greensborough with the second track being commissioned on 11 August 1979.

During 1988-1989, the present Greensborough Highway overpass, located nearby in the down direction from the station, was provided.

In December 2007, Watsonia was upgraded to a premium station.

== Facilities, platforms and services ==
Watsonia is located in a deep cutting, between the Greensborough Highway and Watsonia Road. It has one island platform with two faces, with access to the platforms provided by a pedestrian overpass and a ramp. The station features a customer service window, a coffee shop, an enclosed waiting room, and toilets.

It is served by Hurstbridge line trains.

Watsonia platform arrangement
Platform	Line	Destination	Service Type	Source
1	Hurstbridge line	Flinders Street	All stations and limited express services	
2	Hurstbridge line	Greensborough, Eltham, Hurstbridge	All stations and limited express services	

== Transport links ==
Kinetic Melbourne operates two bus routes via Watsonia station, under contract to Transport Victoria:

- 514 : Eltham station – Glenroy station
- 566 : Lalor – Northland Shopping Centre

SkyBus also operates a service to Melbourne Airport via Watsonia station.
