= Montmorency railway station, Melbourne =

Railway station in Melbourne, Australia

Montmorency
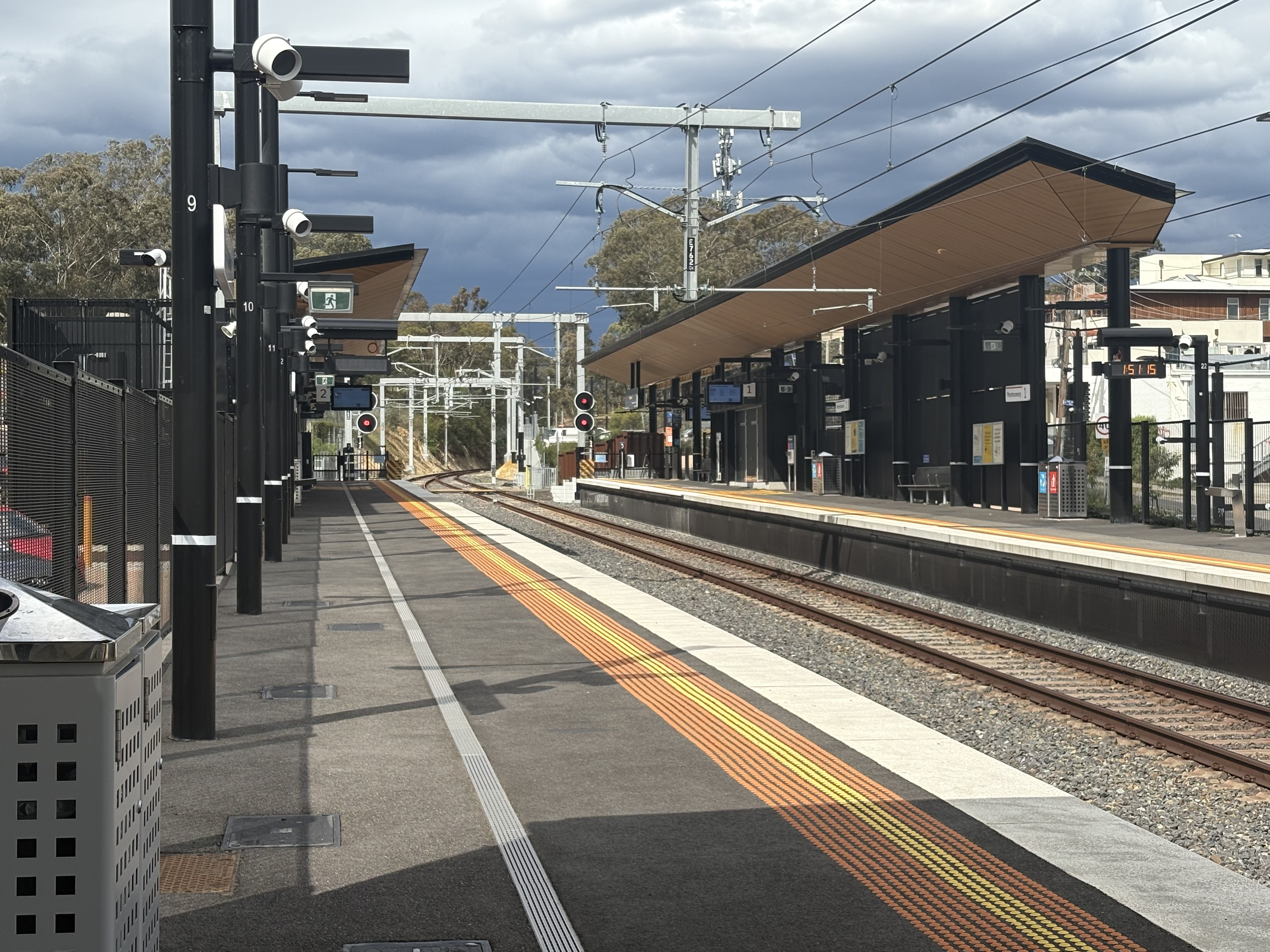
- North-East bound view from Platform 2, September 2025

General information
- Location: Station Road, Montmorency, Victoria 3094; City of Banyule; Australia
- Coordinates: 37°42′55″S 145°07′17″E
- System: PTV commuter rail station
- Owner: VicTrack
- Operator: Metro Trains
- Line: Hurstbridge
- Distance: 24.75 kilometres from Southern Cross
- Platforms: 2 side
- Tracks: 2

Construction
- Structure type: Ground
- Parking: 93 (140 proposed)
- Cycle facilities: Yes
- Accessible: Yes—step free access

Other information
- Status: Operational, unstaffed
- Station code: MMY
- Fare zone: Myki zone 2
- Website: Public Transport Victoria

History
- Opened: 5 September 1923; 103 years ago
- Rebuilt: 30 April 2023
- Electrified: April 1923 (1500 V DC overhead)

Passengers
- 2005–2006: 269,168
- 2006–2007: 295,243 ▲9.68%
- 2007–2008: 332,152 ▲12.5%
- 2008–2009: 343,774 ▲3.49%
- 2009–2010: 348,991 ▲1.51%
- 2010–2011: 359,101 ▲2.89%
- 2011–2012: 330,323 ▼8.01%
- 2012–2013: Not measured
- 2013–2014: 286,060 ▼13.4%
- 2014–2015: 285,753 ▼0.1%
- 2015–2016: 324,015 ▲13.39%
- 2016–2017: 325,422 ▲0.43%
- 2017–2018: 285,712 ▼12.2%
- 2018–2019: 322,354 ▲12.82%
- 2019–2020: 254,100 ▼21.17%
- 2020–2021: 103,450 ▼59.28%
- 2021–2022: 117,950 ▲14.01%

Services
Preceding station	Metro Trains	Following station
Greensborough towards Flinders Street	Hurstbridge line	Eltham towards Hurstbridge
Greensborough towards Flinders Street	Hurstbridge line	Eltham Terminus
Track layout
Location

Montmorency station is a railway station operated by Metro Trains Melbourne on the Hurstbridge line, part of the Melbourne rail network. It serves the north-eastern suburb of Montmorency, in Melbourne, Victoria, Australia. Montmorency station is a ground level premium station, featuring two side platforms. It opened on 5 September 1923, with the current station provided in April 2023.

== History ==
Montmorency station opened twenty-one years after the railway line from Heidelberg was extended to Hurstbridge. Like the suburb itself, the station was named after a local farm, the Montmorency Estate, itself named after the French town Montmorency, Val-d'Oise.

In the lead-up to the 2018 state election, the opposition Liberal Party promised A$300m to duplicate the line between Greensborough and Eltham, and provide Montmorency with a second platform.

On 15 May 2019, the Level Crossing Removal Project announced that planning for the duplication of 3 km of track between Greensborough and Eltham was underway. Final designs of the new station were released on 9 February 2021, with early work of the project commencing in late 2021, with major construction started in 2022. The station was rebuilt approximately 100 m (330 ft) west of the current station, and included a new platform. On 30 April 2023, the rebuilt station opened.

== Platforms, facilities and services ==
Montmorency has two side platforms. It is located between Were Street and Mayona Road, with station access from both. There are sheltered waiting areas on both platforms, two myki top up machines, six myki touch on/off stands and a "pod" for Protective Services Officers.

The station is served by Hurstbridge line trains.

Montmorency platform arrangement
Platform	Line	Destination	Service Type	Source
1	Hurstbridge line	Flinders Street	All stations and limited express services	
2	Hurstbridge line	Eltham, Hurstbridge	All stations and limited express services	

== Gallery ==
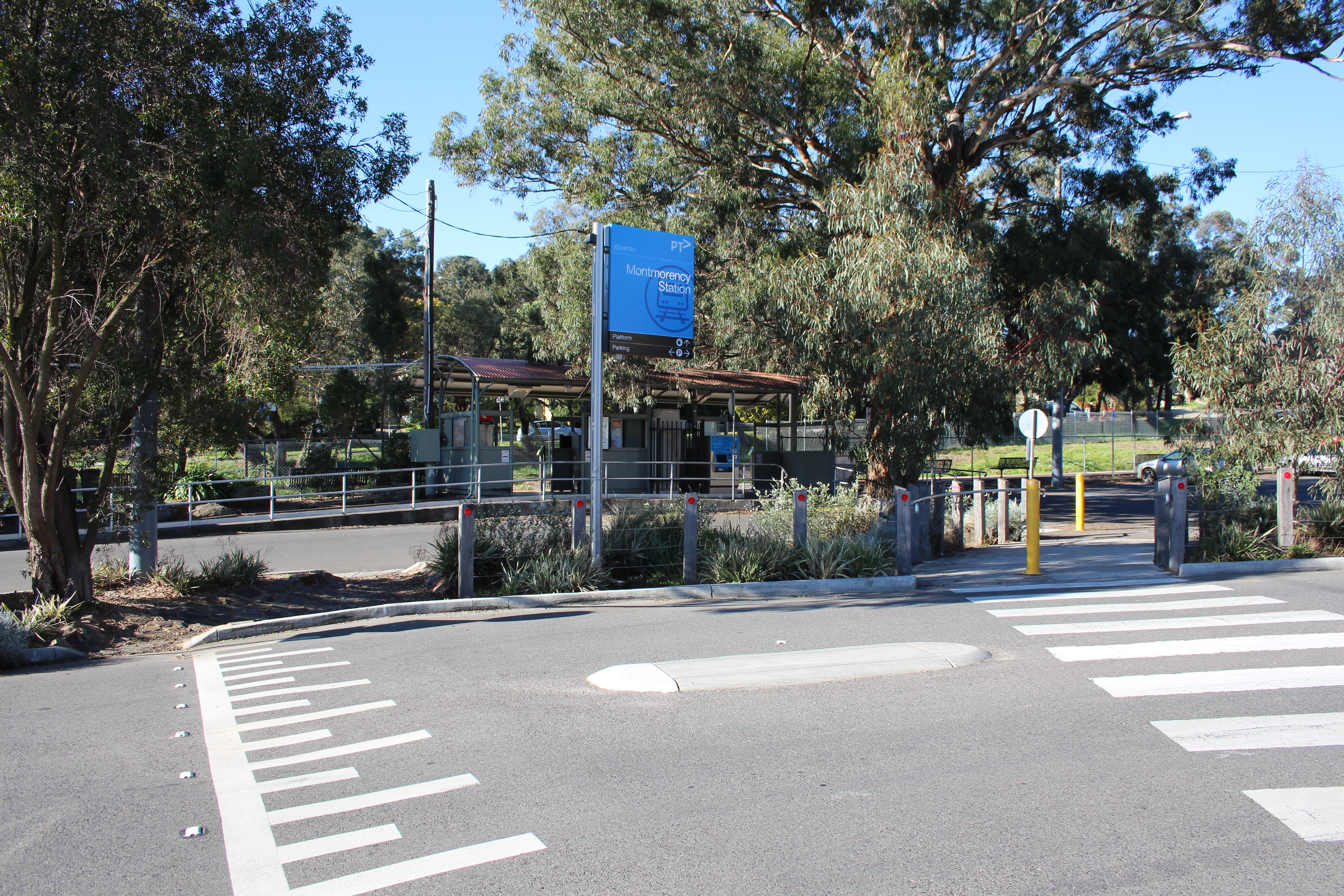
Station forecourt and entrance, September 2014
