= Diamond Creek railway station =

Railway station in Melbourne, Australia

Diamond Creek
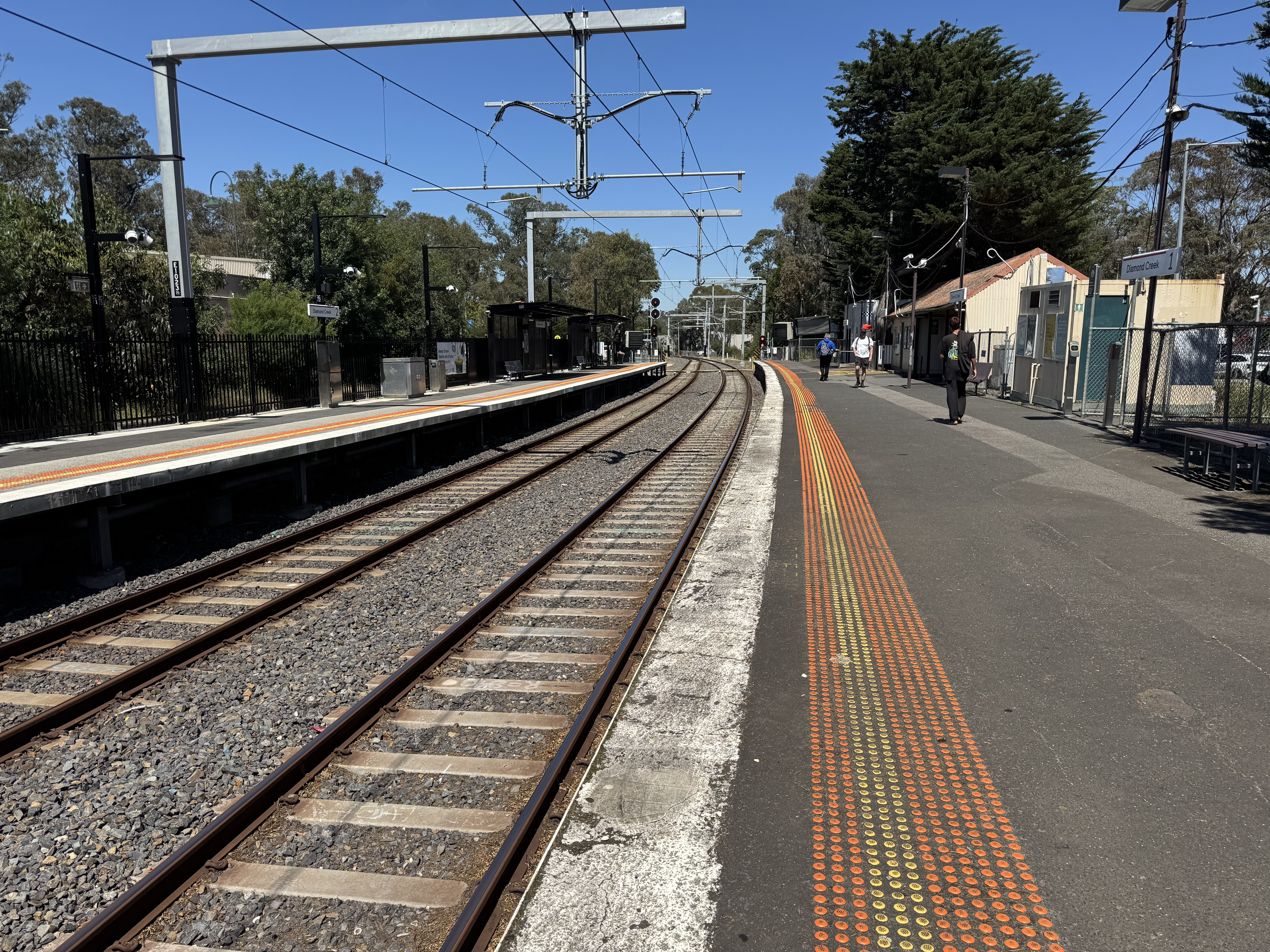
- Southbound view from Platform 1, December 2024

General information
- Location: Hurstbridge Road, Diamond Creek, Victoria 3089; Shire of Nillumbik; Australia
- Coordinates: 37°40′24″S 145°09′31″E
- System: PTV commuter rail station
- Owner: VicTrack
- Operator: Metro Trains
- Line: Hurstbridge
- Distance: 32.63 kilometres from Southern Cross
- Platforms: 2 side
- Tracks: 2
- Connections: Bus

Construction
- Structure type: Ground
- Parking: 79
- Cycle facilities: Yes
- Accessible: Yes — step free access

Other information
- Status: Operational, unstaffed
- Station code: DCK
- Fare zone: Myki zone 2
- Website: Public Transport Victoria

History
- Opened: 25 June 1912; 114 years ago
- Rebuilt: 7 June 1994; 30 April 2023
- Electrified: August 1926 (1500 V DC overhead)

Passengers
- 2005–2006: 186,740
- 2006–2007: 197,744 ▲5.89%
- 2007–2008: 232,461 ▲17.55%
- 2008–2009: 237,000 ▲1.95%
- 2009–2010: 234,000 ▼1.26%
- 2010–2011: 251,000 ▲7.26%
- 2011–2012: 219,000 ▼12.75%
- 2012–2013: Not measured
- 2013–2014: 173,000 ▼21%
- 2014–2015: 174,166 ▲0.67%
- 2015–2016: 189,916 ▲9.04%
- 2016–2017: 185,721 ▼2.21%
- 2017–2018: 167,606 ▼9.75%
- 2018–2019: 177,250 ▲5.75%
- 2019–2020: 151,700 ▼14.41%
- 2020–2021: 72,850 ▼52%
- 2021–2022: 83,600 ▲14.75%
- 2022–2023: 99,200 ▲18.66%
- 2023–2024: 128,950 ▲29.99%
- 2024–2025: 114,700 ▼11.05%

Services
Preceding station	Metro Trains	Following station
Eltham towards Flinders Street	Hurstbridge line	Wattle Glen towards Hurstbridge
Track layout
Location

Diamond Creek station is a railway station operated by Metro Trains Melbourne on the Hurstbridge line, part of the Melbourne rail network. It serves the north-eastern suburb of Diamond Creek, in Melbourne, Victoria, Australia. Diamond Creek station is a ground level unstaffed station, featuring two side platforms. It opened on 25 June 1912, with the current station provided in 2023.

== History ==
Diamond Creek station opened on 25 June 1912, when the railway line from Eltham was extended to Hurstbridge. Like the suburb itself, the station was named after the nearby Diamond Creek, which was given that name as it was believed that the water at the bottom of the creek bed was bright, due to the crystalline minerals of various shapes.

In 1957, the station was closed to goods traffic and, in 1959, flashing light signals were provided at the Hurstbridge Road level crossing, located nearby in the up direction of the station.

In 1979, the station building on Platform 1 was damaged by fire. In 1988, boom barriers were provided at the Hurstbridge Road level crossing.

On 22 March 1991, just after 19:00, a Hurstbridge-bound train collided with a stationary Flinders Street-bound train at the station, resulting in three people injured and three carriages derailing. Parts of the platform were also damaged in the collision.

A passing loop had been provided at the station for many years, believed to have been originally used as a goods siding. On 7 June 1994, a second platform was constructed on the passing loop. Before that, one train had to set back after using the platform, then enter the loop to allow another train to pass. When platform 2 opened, it was only used by a limited services during the peaks, with most services outside those times using platform 1.

Diamond Creek was one of the last stations in Melbourne controlled by the staff and ticket safeworking system, including the use of semaphore signals. The station was a break between two sections of the safeworking system: Eltham to Diamond Creek, and Diamond Creek to Hurstbridge. As a result, staff of Metro Trains were required to operate the safeworking system, including operating the points for the crossing loop. In 2008, the signals and the points were upgraded to be controlled electronically, which also resulted in the previously bidirectional platform 2 becoming uni-directional with only Hurstbridge-bound trains able to use it. In early 2013, the safe working system was converted to Automatic & Track Control (ATC), and platform 2 resignalled to become bi-directional again.

On 15 May 2019, the Level Crossing Removal Project announced planning for the duplication of 1.5 km (0.93 mi) of track between Diamond Creek and Wattle Glen was underway, with construction commencing in early 2022. As part of the duplication works, Platform 2 received an upgrade to allow it to be used full-time. Works were completed in 2023.

As part of the upgrades, platform 2 was widened, resurfaced, and received new shelters. A new access ramp to platform 2 was also built, new signage was installed on both platforms, and the pedestrian crossing at the city end received bells and swing gates.

As part of the upgrade, platform 2 was resignalled for bi-directional operation and is now only used by citybound trains. Platform 1 retained its bidirectional signalling to allow trains from the city to terminate there during disruptions, but is normally only used by Hurstbridge-bound trains under normal circumstances.

The platform numbering here is rather unusual for Melbourne, as conventionally platform 1 is always on the left when facing the city. But at Diamond Creek it is the other way around, with platform 2 is on the left and platform 1 on the right.

== Platforms and services ==
Diamond Creek has two side platforms. It is served by Hurstbridge line trains.

Diamond Creek platform arrangement
Platform	Line	Destination	Service Type	Source
1	Hurstbridge line	Hurstbridge	All stations	
2	Hurstbridge line	Flinders Street	All stations and limited express services	

== Transport links ==
Kinetic Melbourne operates three route to and from Diamond Creek station, under contract to Transport Victoria:

- 381 : to Mernda station
- 343 : Hurstbridge station – Greensborough station
- 580 : Diamond Creek – Eltham station

== Gallery ==
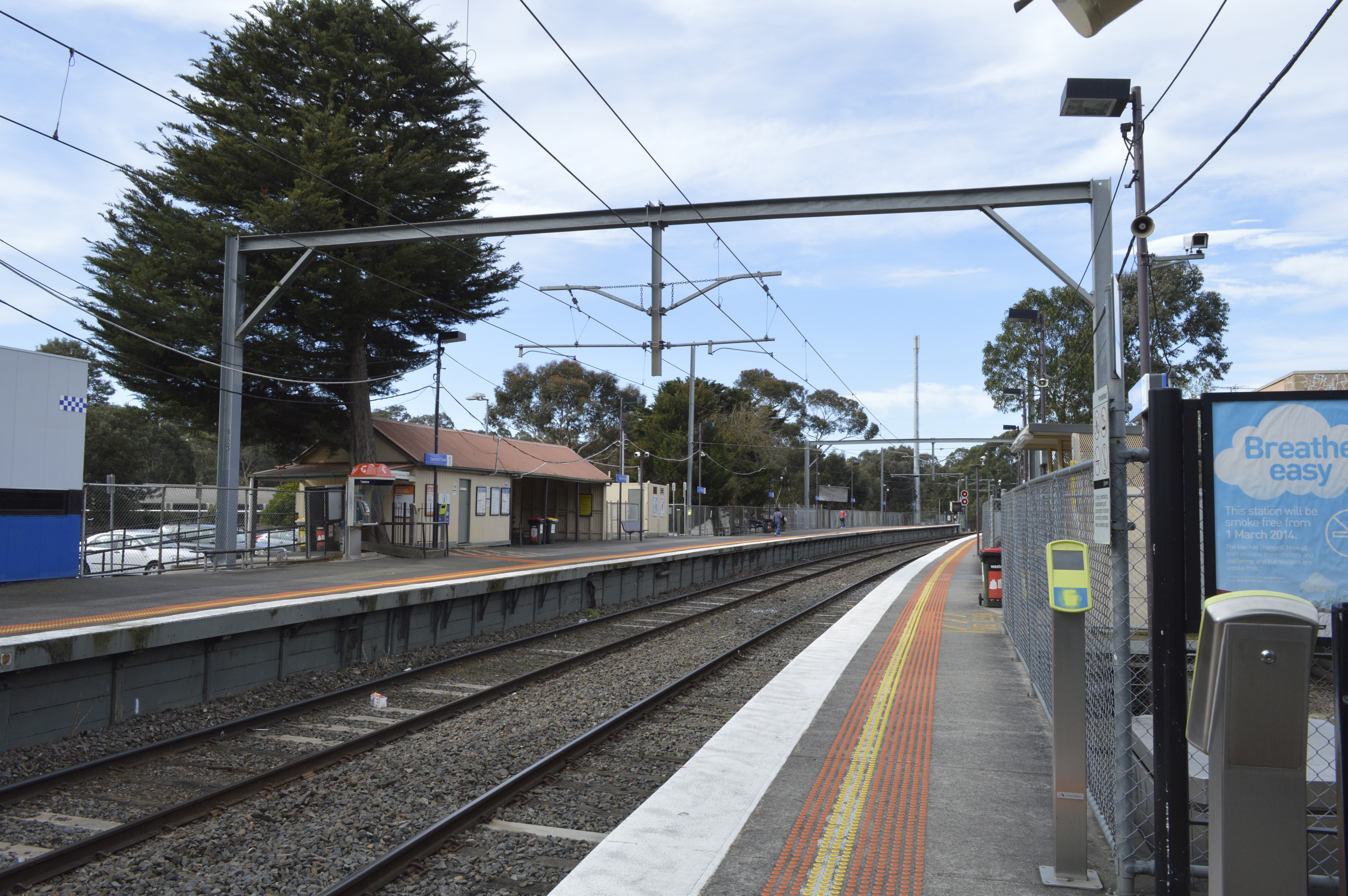
Northbound view from Platform 2, prior to the 2023 upgrade, August 2014

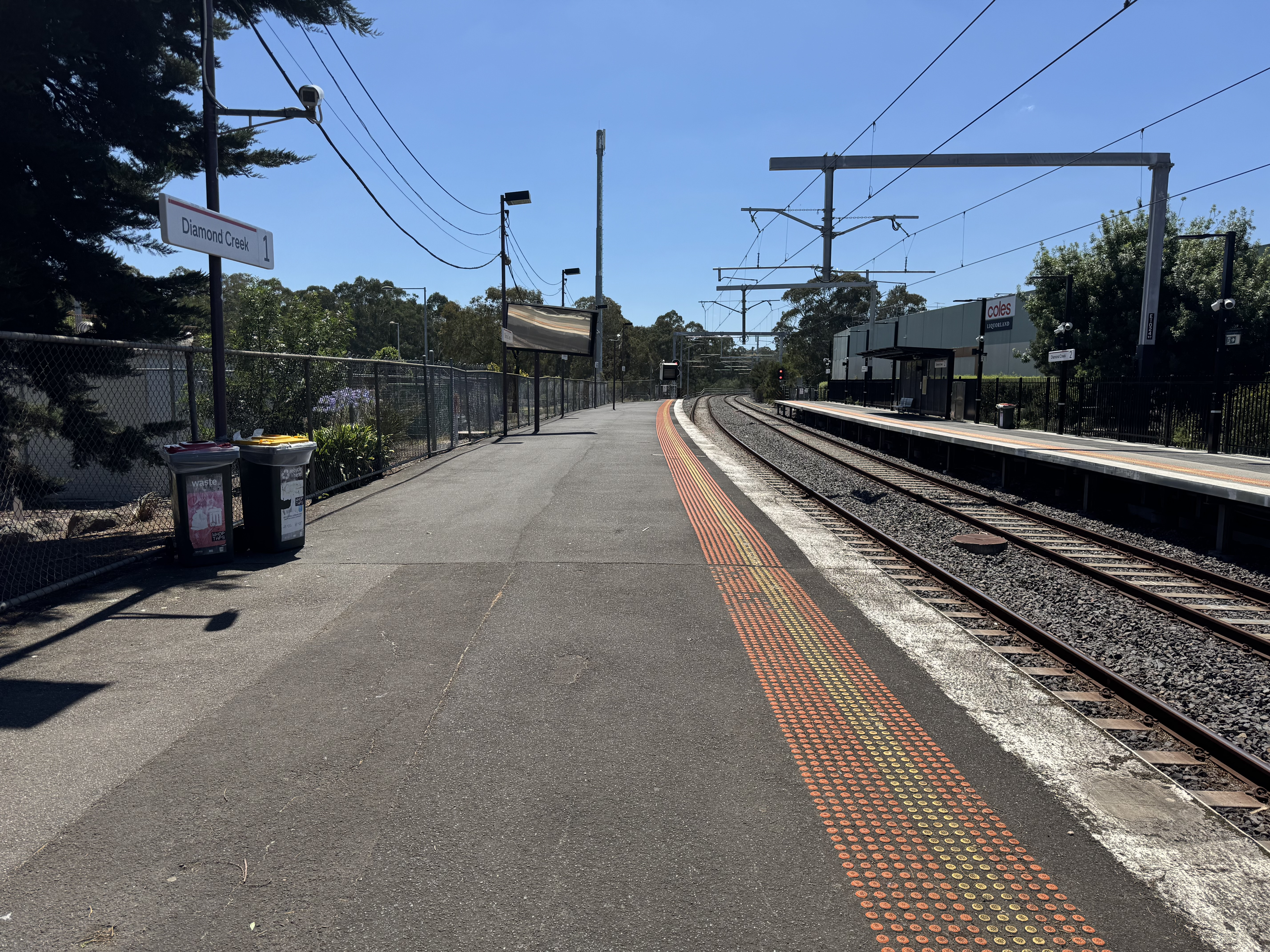
Northbound view from Platform 1, December 2024

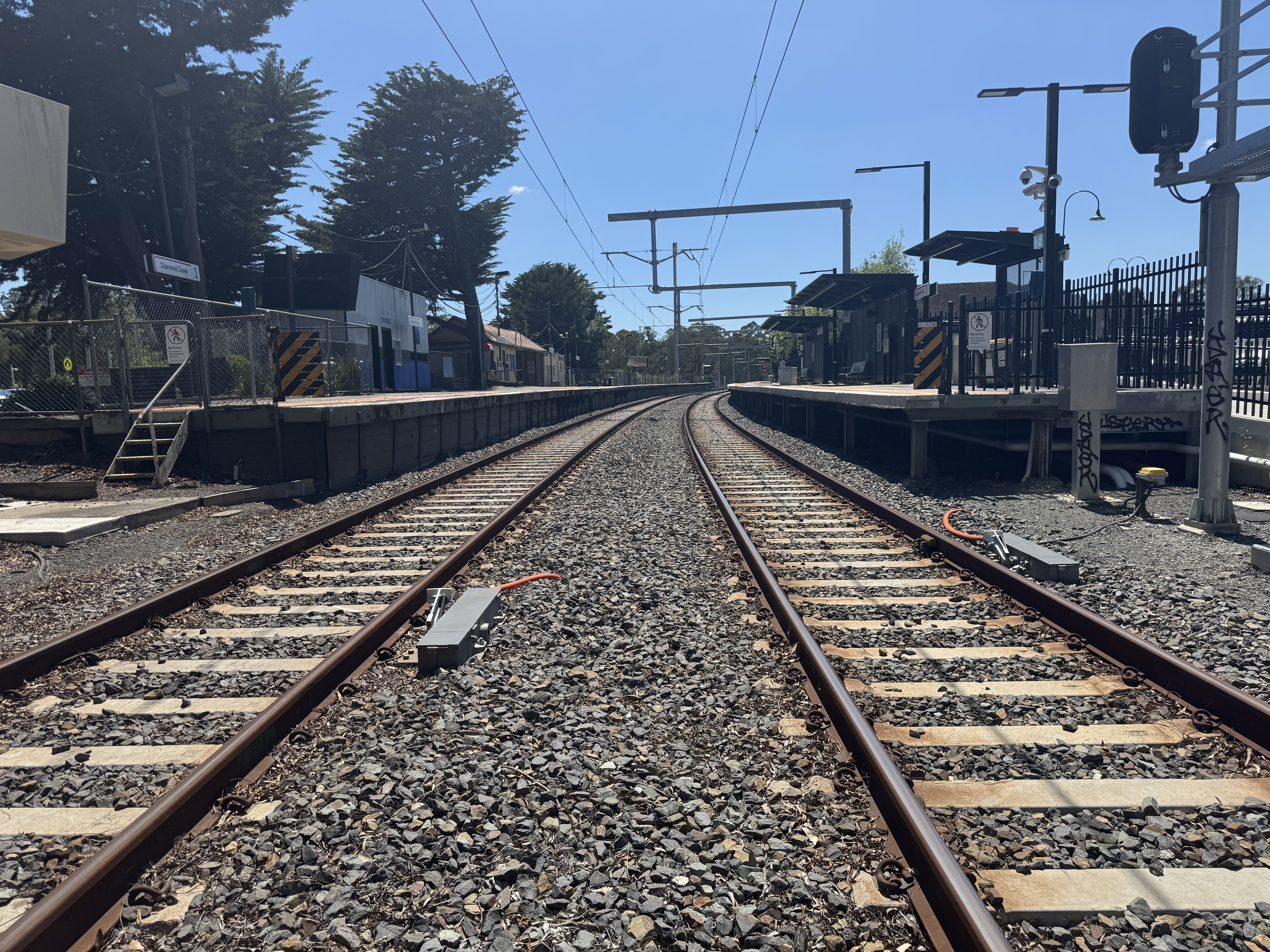
Northbound view of the station platforms, December 2024

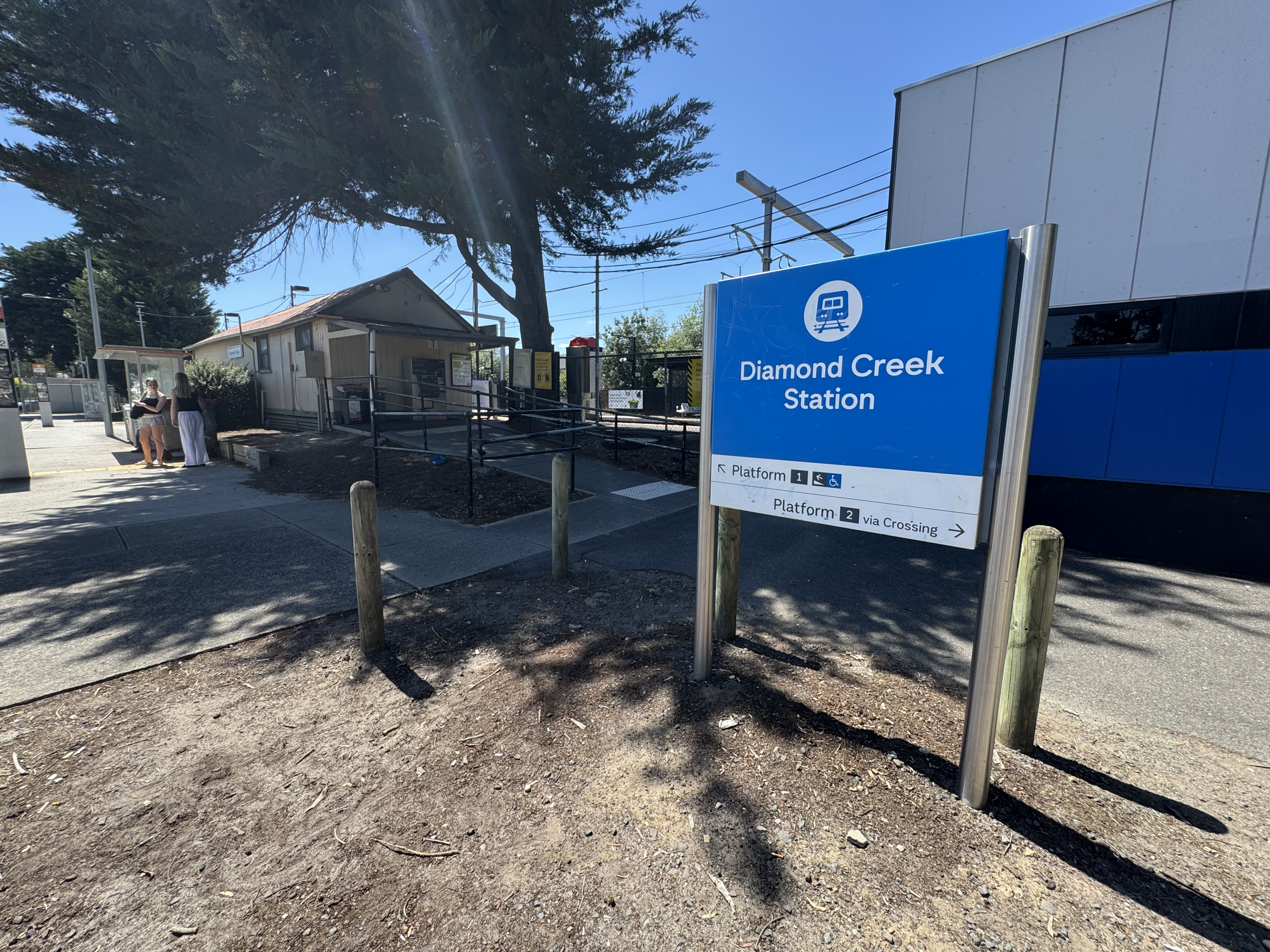
Station signage and entrance to Platform 1 from the western side car park, December 2024
