= Wattle Glen =

- Town
- Interactive map of Wattle Glen
- Coordinates: 37.663°S 145.183°E
- Country: Australia
- State: Victoria
- LGA: Shire of Nillumbik
- Location: 31 km (19 mi) from Melbourne; 4 km (2.5 mi) from Hurstbridge

Government
  - State electorate: Electoral district of Eltham
  - Federal division: Division of McEwen

Area
  - Total: 1.4 km^{2} (0.54 sq mi)

Population
  - Total: 1,911 (2021 census)
  - Density: 1,370/km^{2} (3,540/sq mi)
- Postcode: 3096
Localities around Wattle Glen
Hurstbridge		Panton Hill
Hurstbridge	Wattle Glen	Panton Hill
Diamond Creek	Kangaroo Ground	Kangaroo Ground

Wattle Glen is a town in Victoria, Australia, 25 km north-east of Melbourne's Central Business District, located within the Shire of Nillumbik local government area. Wattle Glen recorded a population of 1,911 at the 2021 census.

The nearest public libraries are Diamond Valley Library and Eltham Library and the mobile library which stops at Hurstbridge operated by Yarra Plenty Regional Library.

== History ==
The Post Office opened on 1 November 1901 as Diamond Creek Upper, was renamed Wattle Glen on 1 November 1922, and closed on 4 April 1975. When the railway line arrived in 1912 the railway station was named Balee on 25 June. This was renamed Wattleglen (as one word) on 14 August 1922. Balee was changed to Wattleglen (one word) on 14 August 1922 as advised by Victorian Railways Weekly Notice No. 32 of 1922, although it is now more commonly known and signed as Wattle Glen (two words).

Its popular meet and greet spot is the local general store, which was built and opened in 1988. The original general store was burnt down in the early 1900s and was located across the road from this one. Locals also gather at the Wattle Glen Cricket Club.

Wattle Glen is a small township wedged between suburbia, Diamond Creek, and the rural fringes of Hurstbridge. There are few facilities except the Railway Station, General Store, Tennis Club, CFA station, and a scout hall. Wattle Glen has a small primary school known as Wattle Glen Primary School.

== See also ==
- Shire of Diamond Valley – Parts of Wattle Glen were previously within this former local government area.
- Shire of Eltham – Parts of Wattle Glen were previously within this former local government area.
