= Wattle Glen railway station =

Railway station in Melbourne, Australia

Wattle Glen
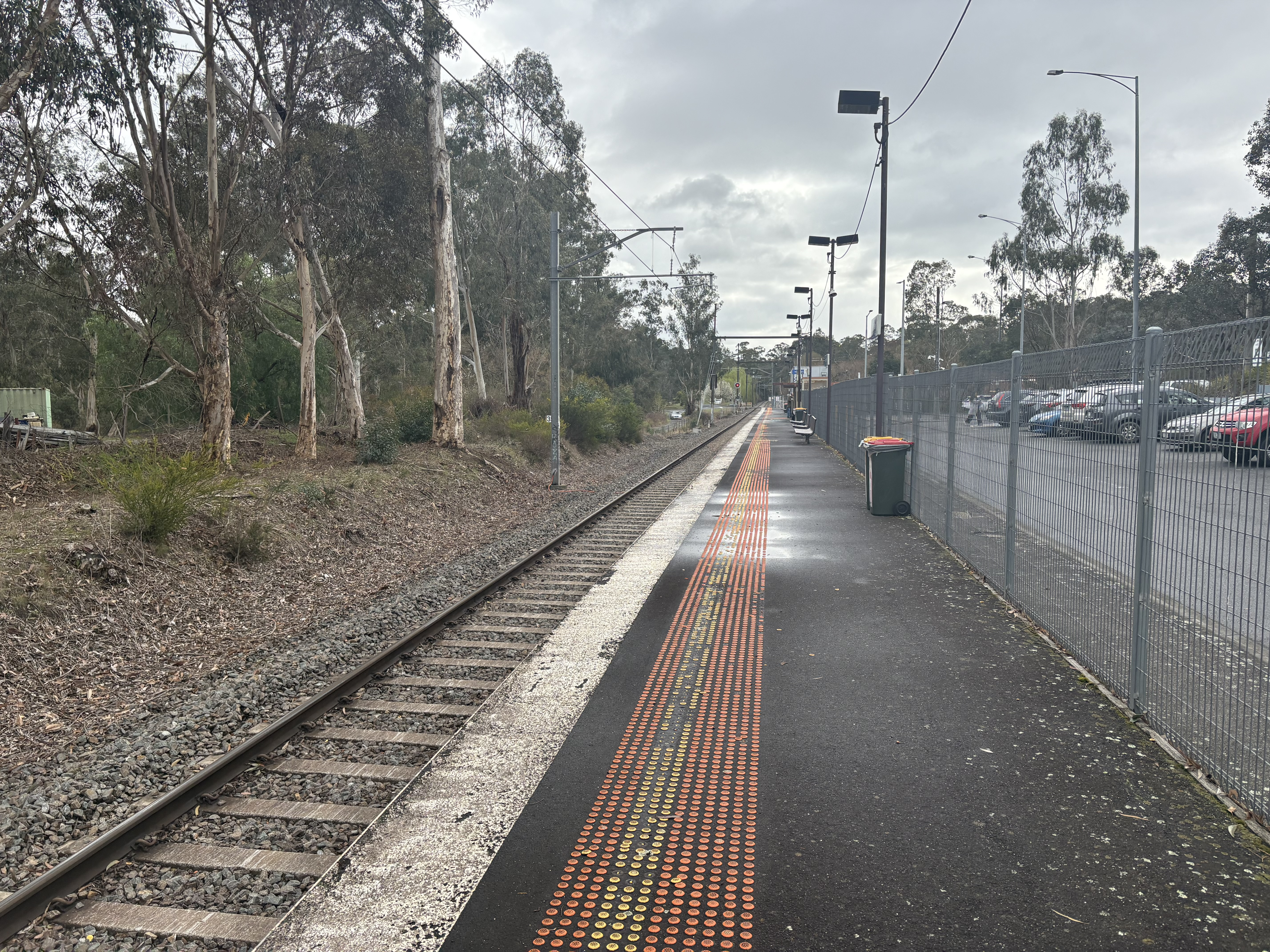
- Northbound view from the single station platform in August 2025

General information
- Other names: Wattleglen
- Location: Hurstbridge Road, Wattle Glen, Victoria 3096; Shire of Nillumbik; Australia
- Coordinates: 37°39′50″S 145°10′54″E
- System: PTV commuter rail station
- Owner: VicTrack
- Operator: Metro Trains
- Line: Hurstbridge
- Distance: 35.06 kilometres from Southern Cross
- Platforms: 1
- Tracks: 1
- Connections: Bus

Construction
- Structure type: Ground
- Parking: 60
- Cycle facilities: Yes (9 hoops)
- Accessible: Yes — step free access

Other information
- Status: Operational, unstaffed
- Station code: WTT
- Fare zone: Myki zone 2
- Website: Public Transport Victoria

History
- Opened: 25 June 1912; 114 years ago
- Electrified: August 1926 (1500 V DC overhead)
- Former names: Balee (1912–1922)

Passengers
- 2005–2006: 45,037
- 2006–2007: 45,619 ▲1.29%
- 2007–2008: 49,115 ▲7.66%
- 2008–2009: 55,000 ▲11.98%
- 2009–2010: 52,000 ▼5.45%
- 2010–2011: 58,000 ▲11.54%
- 2011–2012: 55,000 ▼5.17%
- 2012–2013: Not measured
- 2013–2014: 46,000 ▼16.36%
- 2014–2015: 48,312 ▲5.02%
- 2015–2016: 51,341 ▲6.26%
- 2016–2017: 52,664 ▲2.57%
- 2017–2018: 46,575 ▼11.56%
- 2018–2019: 48,050 ▲3.17%
- 2019–2020: 35,850 ▼25.4%
- 2020–2021: 16,600 ▼53.7%
- 2021–2022: 17,550 ▲5.72%
- 2022–2023: 20,800 ▲18.52%
- 2023–2024: 30,100 ▲44.71%
- 2024–2025: 27,200 ▼9.63%

Services
Preceding station	Metro Trains	Following station
Diamond Creek towards Flinders Street	Hurstbridge line	Hurstbridge Terminus
Track layout
Location

Wattle Glen station is a railway station operated by Metro Trains Melbourne on the Hurstbridge line, part of the Melbourne rail network. It serves the north-eastern suburb of Wattle Glen, in Melbourne, Victoria, Australia. Wattle Glen station is a ground level unstaffed station, featuring one side platform. It opened on 25 June 1912.

Initially opened as Balee, it was changed to Wattleglen (one word) on 14 August 1922. However, currently the station is signed and commonly known as Wattle Glen (two words).

== History ==
Wattle Glen station opened on 25 June 1912, when the railway line from Eltham was extended to Hurstbridge. Like the suburb itself, the station is named after the wattle trees that are in abundance throughout the area.

In 1968, flashing light signals were provided at the Wilson Road level crossing, located nearby in the down direction of the station. In 1979, the former station building was destroyed by fire. In 1987, boom barriers were provided at the Wilson Road level crossing.

In late 2007, an upgrade to the station and its car park took place, and included installing fencing and sealing the car park.

In 2018, it was announced that the Level Crossing Removal Project would undergo a second upgrade on the Hurstbridge line, which involved duplicating the track between Wattle Glen and Diamond Creek. However, no upgrades were proposed for the station itself or the nearby Wilson Road level crossing, with the duplication ending south of the level crossing. The duplication was completed in 2023.

During the 2018/2019 financial year, Wattle Glen was the least-patronised station on Melbourne's metropolitan network, with approximately 48,000 passenger movements annually.

In 2020, it was announced that the station car park will be upgraded with 50 new spots, improved CCTV and lighting, as well as more bicycle parking facilities.

Although the railway station signage and the operator's public timetables render the name of the station as two words, some internal sources, such as VicNames, and the internal network map, renders the official spelling of the station as Wattleglen, one word. However, the operator's internal signalling diagram uses the two word form. It is unclear why the Post Office and suburb were made two words when the Post Office was renamed from Diamond Creek Upper on 1 November 1922, particularly after the station had been renamed (as one word) two and a half months earlier.

== Platforms and services ==
Wattle Glen has one platform. It is served by Hurstbridge line trains.

Wattle Glen platform arrangement
Platform	Line	Destination	Service Type	Souce
1	Hurstbridge line	Hurstbridge, Flinders Street	All stations and limited express services	

== Transport links ==
Kinetic Melbourne operates one route via Wattle Glen station, under contract toTransport Victoria:

- 343 : Hurstbridge station – Greensborough station
