= Alphington railway station =

Railway station in Melbourne, Australia

Alphington
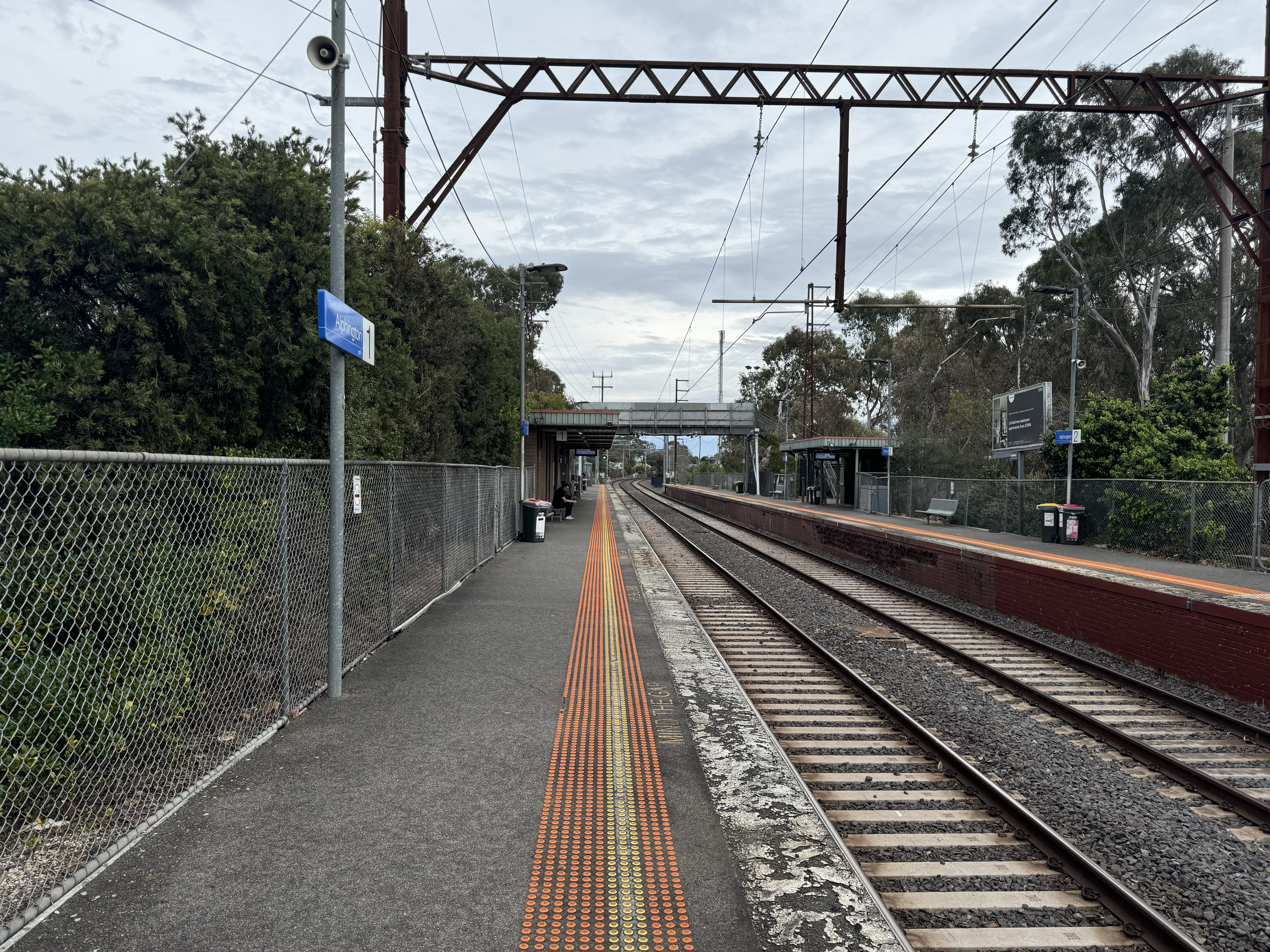
- Westbound view from Platform 1, August 2024

General information
- Location: Rowe Street, Alphington, Victoria 3078; City of Darebin; Australia
- Coordinates: 37°46′42″S 145°01′53″E
- System: PTV commuter rail station
- Owner: VicTrack
- Operator: Metro Trains
- Line: Hurstbridge
- Distance: 10.46 kilometres from Southern Cross
- Platforms: 2 side
- Tracks: 2
- Connections: Bus

Construction
- Structure type: Ground
- Parking: 119
- Cycle facilities: 5
- Accessible: Yes

Other information
- Status: Operational, unstaffed
- Station code: ALP
- Fare zone: Myki zone 1
- Website: Public Transport Victoria

History
- Opened: 8 May 1888; 138 years ago
- Rebuilt: 1979
- Electrified: July 1921 (1500 V DC overhead)

Passengers
- 2005–2006: 278,977
- 2006–2007: 297,434 ▲6.61%
- 2007–2008: 316,732 ▲6.48%
- 2008–2009: 316,047 ▼0.212%
- 2009–2010: 323,038 ▲2.21%
- 2010–2011: 321,010 ▼0.62%
- 2011–2012: 287,551 ▼10.42%
- 2012–2013: Not measured
- 2013–2014: 273,566 ▼4.86%
- 2014–2015: 279,012 ▲1.99%
- 2015–2016: 306,621 ▲9.89%
- 2016–2017: 303,367 ▼1.06%
- 2017–2018: 243,307 ▼19.8%
- 2018–2019: 296,900 ▲22.03%
- 2019–2020: 239,400 ▼19.37%
- 2020–2021: 109,600 ▼54.2%
- 2021–2022: 129,950 ▲18.56%
- 2022–2023: 216,150 ▲66.33%
- 2023–2024: 244,050 ▲12.91%
- 2024–2025: 249,100 ▲2.07%

Services
| Preceding station | Metro Trains | Following station |
|---|---|---|
| Fairfield towards Flinders Street | Hurstbridge line | Darebin towards Hurstbridge |
Track layout
Location

Alphington station is a railway station operated by Metro Trains Melbourne on the Hurstbridge line, part of the Melbourne rail network. It serves the north-eastern suburb of Alphington, in Melbourne, Victoria, Australia. Alphington station is a ground level unstaffed station, featuring two side platforms. It opened on 8 May 1888, with the current station provided in 1979.

== History ==
Alphington station opened on 8 May 1888, when a railway line between Collingwood and Heidelberg was provided. Like the suburb itself, the station was named after Alphington in Devon, England, which was the birthplace of Sir William Manning, who subdivided his property in the area into a village.

In 1912, duplication between Westgarth and Alphington was provided. In 1951, duplication to Ivanhoe was provided.

In 1966, boom barriers replaced interlocked gates at the Yarralea Street level crossing, located at the down end of the station. The signal box and a goods yard were also abolished at that time.

In 1979, the current station buildings were provided.

== Platforms and services ==
Alphington has two side platforms. It is served by Metro Trains' Hurstbridge line trains.

Alphington platform arrangement
| Platform | Line | Destination | Service Type | Source |
|---|---|---|---|---|
| 1 | Hurstbridge line | Flinders Street | All stations and limited express services | |
| 2 | Hurstbridge line | Macleod, Greensborough, Eltham or Hurstbridge | All stations and limited express services | |

== Transport links ==
Kinetic Melbourne operates one bus route via Alphington station, under contract to Public Transport Victoria:

- 508 : to Moonee Ponds Junction
