= Hurstbridge line =

Passenger rail service in metropolitan Melbourne, Victoria, Australia

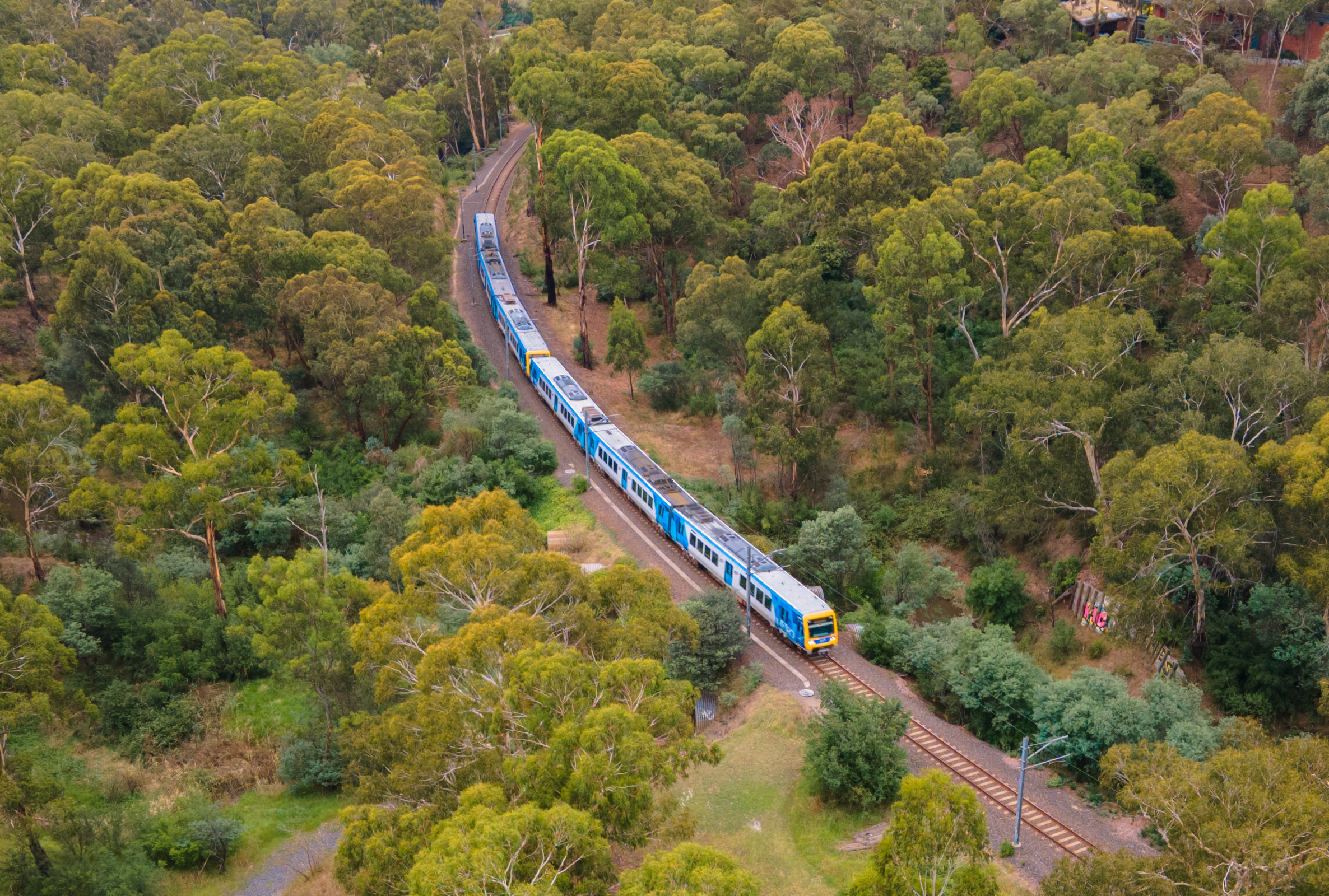
- An X'Trapolis train on an outer, single-track section of the Hurstbridge line near Diamond Creek station, February 2021

Overview
- Service type: Commuter rail
- System: Melbourne railway network
- Status: Operational
- Locale: Melbourne, Victoria, Australia
- Predecessor: Heidelberg (1888–1912); Eltham (1889–1902); Hurstbridge (1902–1926); Heidelberg ^ (1921–1923); Eltham ^ (1923–1926)^ are electric services
- First service: 8 May 1888; 138 years ago
- Current operator: Metro Trains
- Former operators: Victorian Railways (VR) (1888–1974); VR as VicRail (1974–1983); MTA (The Met) (1983–1989); PTC (The Met) (1989–1998); Hillside Trains (1998–2000); Connex Melbourne (2000–2009)

Route
- Termini: Flinders Street; Hurstbridge
- Stops: 28 (including City Loop stations)
- Distance travelled: 36.7 km (22.8 mi)
- Average journey time: 1 hour 9 minutes (via City Loop)
- Service frequency: 5–20 minutes weekdays peak; 20 minutes weekdays off-peak; 20 minutes weekend daytime; 30 minutes nights; 60 minutes early weekend mornings; Double frequency between Flinders Street and Clifton Hill in combination with Mernda line; Some services only run between Flinders Street and either Heidelberg, Macleod, Greensborough or Eltham
- Line used: Hurstbridge

Technical
- Rolling stock: X'Trapolis 100
- Track gauge: 1,600 mm (5 ft 3 in)
- Electrification: 1500 V DC overhead
- Track owner: VicTrack

The Hurstbridge line is a commuter railway line in the city of Melbourne, Victoria, Australia. Operated by Metro Trains Melbourne, it is the city's seventh longest metropolitan railway line at 36.7 kilometres (22.8 mi). The line runs from Flinders Street Station in central Melbourne to Hurstbridge Station in the north-east, serving 28 stations via Clifton Hill, Heidelberg, Macleod, Greensborough, Eltham and Diamond Creek. The line operates for approximately 19 hours a day (from approximately 5:00 am to around 12:00 am) with 24 hour service available on Friday and Saturday nights. During peak hour, headways of up to 15 minutes are operated with services every 20–30 minutes during off-peak hours. Trains on the Hurstbridge Line run with a two three-car formations of X'Trapolis 100 trainsets.

Sections of the Hurstbridge Line opened as early as 1888, with the line fully extended to Hurstbridge by 1912. The line was built to connect Melbourne with the suburbs of Greensborough, Eltham, and Hurstbridge, amongst others.

Since the 2010s, due to the heavily utilised infrastructure of the Hurstbridge Line, significant improvements and upgrades have been made. An upgrade of the corridor from Heidelberg Station onwards began construction in 2016 and mostly completed by 2023, with improvements including the removal of level crossings, rebuilding stations, and the duplication of more than 4.5 km (2.8 mi) of track. Other works have included replacing sleepers, upgrading signalling technology, the introduction of new rolling stock, and station accessibility upgrades.

== History ==
=== 19th century ===
The first section of the Hurstbridge Line opened between Victoria Park (then named Collingwood) and Heidelberg in May 1888. At this time, the line was connected to other lines via a line from Royal Park to Clifton Hill, most of which comprised what was later known as the Inner Circle line. This connection was opened at the same time.

The section from Flinders Street to Victoria Park, was built later than the rest of the line, which was originally connected to the suburban system via the now-closed Inner Circle railway line. The section between Jolimont and West Richmond runs through two tunnels under a low ridge just east of the city, while the line from West Richmond to Victoria Park runs on an embankment that carries the line above numerous main roads and suburban side streets.

=== 20th century ===
A more direct connection, between Princes Bridge and Victoria Park (as Collingwood was renamed at the same time) was opened in October 1901. In June the following year, the line was extended to Eltham, and ten years later (in June 1912) to Hurst's Bridge (now Hurstbridge). In 1912, the Mont Park branch line was built branching from Macleod to serve the newly built Mont Park Asylum. Also in 1912, the line between Westgarth and Alphington was duplicated.

In 1919, a branch line opened to the Australian Paper Manufacturers paper mill just after Fairfield. This 1.1-kilometre (0.7 mi) brought freight traffic into the mill for its 75-year lifespan, before its closure in 1994.

In April 1921, automatic signalling was implemented between Princes Bridge and Clifton Hill Station, and a few months later, the line (from Princes Bridge) was electrified to Heidelberg, followed by electrification to Eltham in April 1923, and Hurstbridge in August 1926. In September 1926, the single-track section between Clifton Hill and Westgarth was converted to Lever Locking and Track Control signalling, followed by Alphington Station to Heidelberg in June 1927.

In June 1949, the line between Ivanhoe and Heidelberg was duplicated and provided with automatic signalling. The same was done to the Alphington to Ivanhoe section in December 1951. Duplication continued between Heidelberg and Macleod in December 1958, except for a short section after Heidelberg Station where the line crosses a bridge then goes through a tunnel. That section remained single tracked until 2018 when it was duplicated as part of the Level Crossing Removal Project at Lower Plenty Road near Rosanna Station.

Macleod to Greensborough was duplicated and converted to automatic signalling in August 1979. The duplication also included a number of level crossing removals and a rebuilt Watsonia. Macleod is the only station on the Hurstbridge Line with more than two platforms. A third platform was provided in the 1970s, and is used during peak periods to provide a place at which trains can originate or terminate.

Weekend services commenced through running to Hurstbridge in April 1985. Previously, weekend services between Eltham and Hurstbridge operated as a shuttle service, with passengers required to change trains at Eltham. Prior to the timetable change, the shuttle service was provided by a double ended motored Tait train, and after their withdrawal in 1984, the shuttle service was provided by a 3 car Hitachi or Comeng train.

=== 21st century ===
In 2009, a short section between Clifton Hill and Westgarth was duplicated, including the construction of a second Merri Creek river crossing at Clifton Hill. The rarely used centre running line at Clifton Hill was also removed at this time. One year later, the Burgundy Street bridge near Heidelberg Station was replaced. This bridge was upgraded again in 2019 as part of the Hurstbridge Line Duplication project.

Since 2017, X'Trapolis 100 trains began operating on the line, replacing the Comeng train-sets. The new stock features three doors per side on each carriage with the ability to seat 432 passengers in each six-carriage configuration.

== Infrastructure upgrades ==
=== Hurstbridge Line Duplication ===
==== Stage 1 (Heidelberg to Rosanna) ====
The logo of the Hurstbridge Line Duplication project.

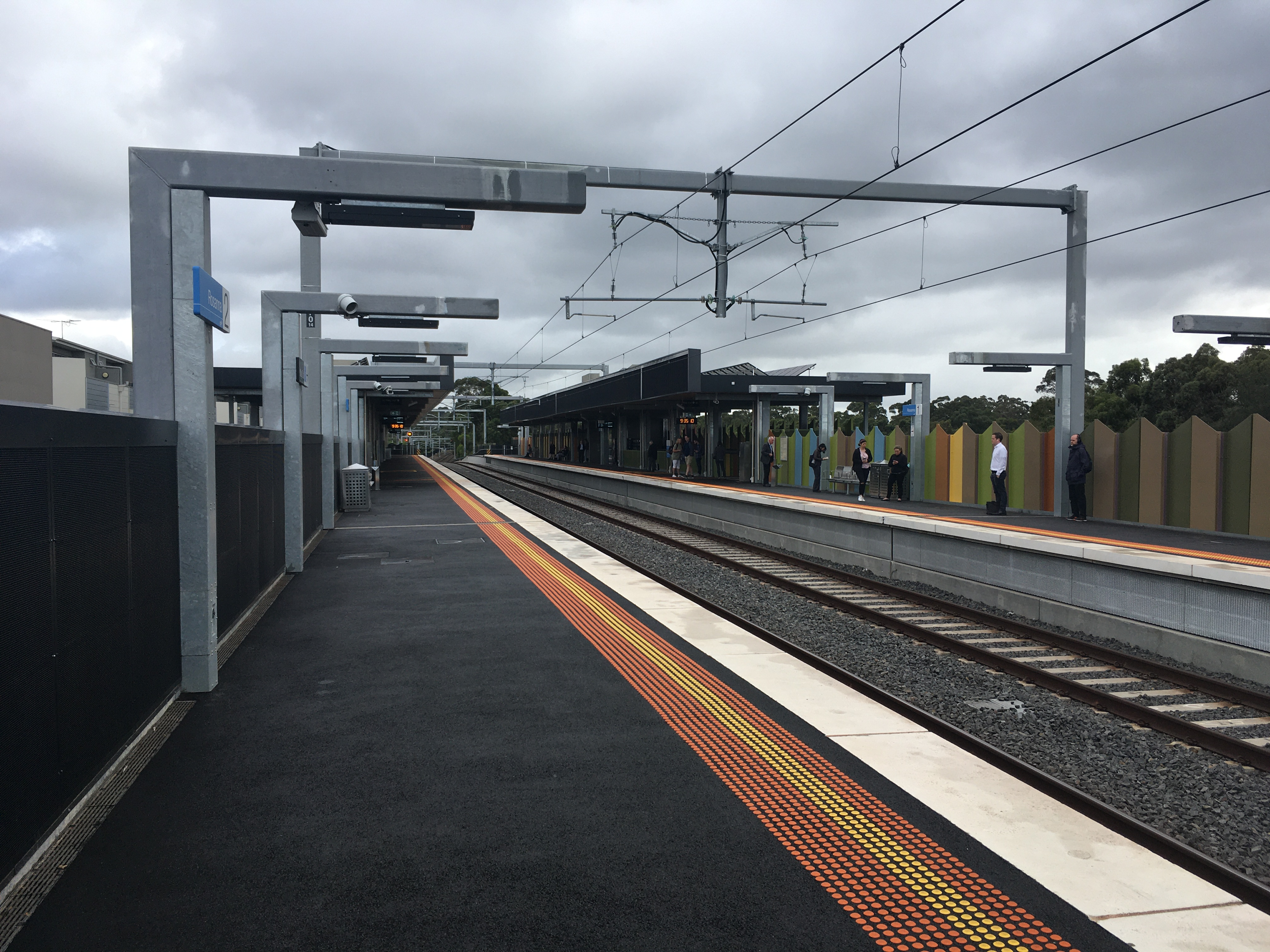
The rebuilt platforms at Rosanna station in March 2020.

In May 2016, the Victorian Government allocated funding for stage one of the Hurstbridge Line Duplication. The first stage involved:

- Duplicating a 1.2-kilometre (0.75 mi) section of track between Heidelberg and Rosanna
- The removal of two level crossings at Grange Road, Alphington and Lower Plenty Road, Rosanna
- A newly elevated Rosanna Station
- The construction of a second rail bridge over Burgundy Street in Heidelberg
- The construction of a second tunnel for Flinders Street-bound trains under Darebin Street

Construction was coordinated on the level crossing removals and duplication so both projects would be delivered more efficiently, with fewer disruptions to passengers while work is carried out. Early works on the duplication began in June 2016, with major construction started in March 2017. On 6 October of that year, the former ground Rosanna Station closed for demolition. The 6-week 24/7 major construction blitz began on 16 March 2018 with the closure of the rail corridor to allow construction to ramp up. The new elevated Rosanna Station opened with the duplication of the single-track section completed on 30 April 2018, with 35 new and extended weekly train services between Eltham Station and the city loop introduced on 26 August of that year.

==== Stage 2 (Greensborough to Montmorency and Diamond Creek to Wattle Glen) ====
In May 2019, a second stage of track duplication was announced. When announced, the second stage originally involved:

- Duplicating 3 km (1.9 mi) of track between Greensborough and Eltham and 1.5 km (0.93 mi) of track between Diamond Creek and Wattle Glen
- The full reconstruction of Greensborough and Montmorency stations
- The extension of platform 2 at Diamond Creek Station

Under this plan, the heritage listed Eltham Trestle Bridge would be retained as that section of track did not need to be duplicated due to other improvements on the line. However, in June 2021, it was announced that the Greensborough to Eltham duplication was cut back to 2 km (1.2 mi) of track between Greensborough and Montmorency stations. This was to avoid affecting an endangered Eltham copper butterfly habitat near Montmorency Station that was not discovered during prior environmental assessments of the project. The state government opted to cut back the duplication rather than to go through additional lengthy environmental approval processes, while claiming the revised duplication would not reduce the service frequency that was originally promised. The Eltham Trestle Bridge remained unaffected by the revised duplication. The rest of the second stage also proceeded as planned.

Site investigations commenced in 2020, with early works on the corridor started in 2021 and construction kicked off throughout 2022, with a 2-week closure in September of that year seeing the raising of the second Plenty River rail bridge as well as other works. The 6-week 24/7 major construction blitz began on 16 March 2023 with the closure of the rail corridor to allow duplication works to ramp up. The duplication and opening of the new Greensborough and Montmorency stations occurred on 30 April 2023. Other works including landscaping, the construction of car-parking, and other final works all completed in late 2023.

=== Level Crossing Removals ===
Delivered in conjunction with the Hurstbridge Line Duplication project, the Level Crossing Removal Project has announced the removal of 3 level crossings on the line, to be completed in stages from 2018 to 2027. In 2018, 2 level crossings were removed at Grange Road, Alphington and Lower Plenty Road, Rosanna. The crossing at Grange Road in Alphington involved lowering the rail line into a trench under the road, with the rail line being elevated at Lower Plenty Road to create a rail bridge over the road. As part of this removal, Rosanna Station was rebuilt. In the lead up to the 2022 Victorian state election, the incumbent Andrews government announced the construction of a rail bridge to remove the level crossing at Ruthven Street near Macleod Station by 2027. At the end of these removals, the Hurstbridge Line will have 13 remaining crossings on the corridor that aren't slated for removal.

== Network and operations ==
=== Services ===
Services on the Hurstbridge line operates from approximately 5:00 am to around 12:00 daily. In general, during peak hours, train frequency is 10–20 minutes in the AM peak on the Hurstbridge line while during non-peak hours the frequency is reduced to 20–30 minutes throughout the entire route. After Eltham, frequencies are reduced due to infrastructure constraints. On Friday nights and weekends, services run 24 hours a day, with 60 minute frequencies available outside of normal operating hours.

Train services on the Hurstbridge line are also subjected to maintenance and renewal works, usually on selected Fridays and Saturdays. Shuttle bus services are provided throughout the duration of works for affected commuters.

==== Stopping patterns ====
Legend — Station status

- ◼ Premium Station – Station staffed from first to last train
- ◻ Host Station – Usually staffed during morning peak, however this can vary for different stations on the network.

Legend — Stopping patterns
Some services do not operate via the City Loop

- ● – All trains stop
- ◐ – Some services do not stop
- ▲ – Only inbound trains stop
- ▼ – Only outbound trains stop (trains operate clockwise through the city loop all day)
- | – Trains pass and do not stop

Hurstbridge Services
Station	Zone	Local	Ltd Express	Eltham	Greensborough	Macleod
◼ Flinders Street	1	●	●	●	●	●
◼ Southern Cross	1	▼	▼	▼	▼	▼
◼ Flagstaff	1	▼	▼	▼	▼	▼
◼ Melbourne Central	1	▼	▼	▼	▼	▼
◼ Parliament	1	▼	▼	▼	▼	▼
◻ Jolimont	1	●	●	●	●	●
West Richmond	1	●	▲	●	◐	●
North Richmond	1	●	▲	●	◐	●
Collingwood	1	●	▲	●	◐	●
Victoria Park	1	●	●	●	●	●
◼ Clifton Hill	1	●	●	●	●	●
Westgarth	1	●	|	●	◐	●
Dennis	1	●	|	●	◐	●
◻ Fairfield	1	●	|	●	◐	●
Alphington	1	●	|	●	◐	●
Darebin	1	●	|	●	◐	●
◼ Ivanhoe	1/2	●	●	●	●	●
Eaglemont	1/2	●	|	●	◐	●
◼ Heidelberg	1/2	●	●	●	●	●
Rosanna	2	●	●	●	●	●
◼ Macleod	2	●	●	●	●	●
◼ Watsonia	2	●	●	●	●	
◼ Greensborough	2	●	●	●	●	
Montmorency	2	●	●	●		
◼ Eltham	2	●	●	●		
Diamond Creek	2	●	●			
Wattle Glen	2	●	●			
◻ Hurstbridge	2	●	●			

=== Operators ===
The Hurstbridge line has had a total of 6 operators since its opening in 1888. The majority of operations throughout its history have been government run: from its first service in 1888 until the 1999 privatisation of Melbourne's rail network, four different government operators have run the line. These operators, Victorian Railways, the Metropolitan Transit Authority, the Public Transport Corporation, and Hillside Trains have a combined operational length of 111 years. Hillside Trains was privatised in August 1999 and later rebranded Connex Melbourne. Metro Trains Melbourne, the current private operator, then took over the operations in 2009. Both private operators have had a combined operational period of 27 years.

Past and present operators of the Hurstbridge line:
Operator	Assumed operations	Ceased operations	Length of operations
Victorian Railways	1888	1983	95 years
Metropolitan Transit Authority	1983	1989	6 years
Public Transport Corporation	1989	1998	9 years
Hillside Trains (government operator)	1998	1999	1 year
Connex Melbourne	1999	2009	10 years
Metro Trains Melbourne	2009	incumbent	16 years (ongoing)

=== Route ===
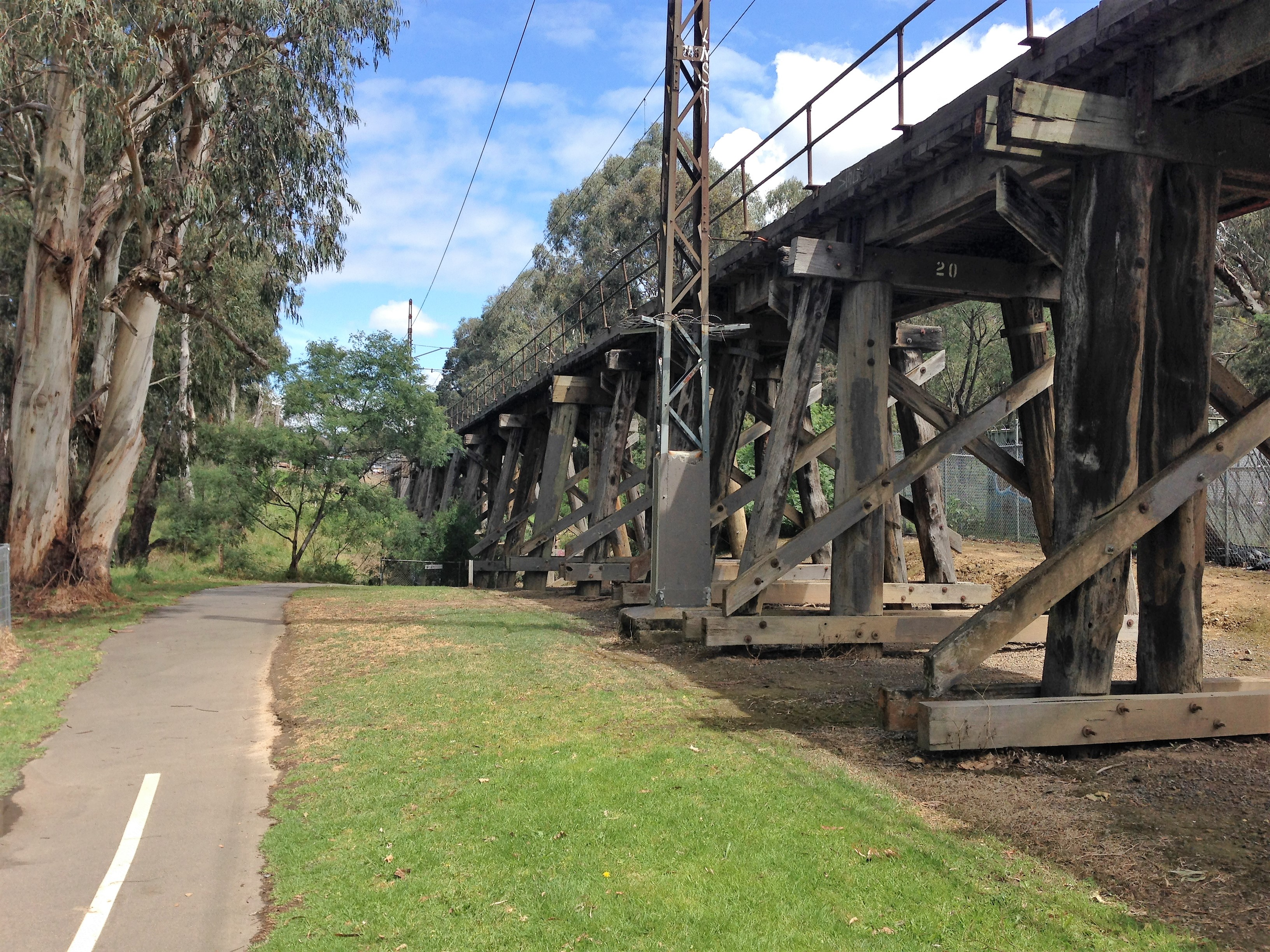
The Eltham rail trestle bridge near Eltham Station is one of the longest in the southern hemisphere.

Interactive map of the Hurstbridge line in north-eastern Melbourne.

Hurstbridge (physical track)

Overview
- Status: Operational with passenger services from Flinders Street to Hurstbridge
- Owner: Victorian Railways (VR) (1888–1974); VR as VicRail (1974–1983); MTA (The Met) (1983–1989); PTC (The Met) (1989–1997); VicTrack (1997–Current)
- Locale: Melbourne, Victoria, Australia
- Termini: Flinders Street; Hurstbridge
- Connecting lines: All metropolitan, regional, and interstate
- Former connections: Mont Park; Outer Circle
- Stations: 28 current stations; 1 former stations; 1 former siding

Service
- Services: Hurstbridge

History
- Work began: 8 May 1888
- Opened: Flinders Street to Princes Bridge on 18 December 1865; Collingwood to Heidelberg on 8 May 1888; Princes Bridge to Collingwood on 21 October 1901; Heidelberg to Eltham on 5 June 1902; To Hurstbridge on 25 June 1912
- Completed: 25 June 1912
- Electrified: Princes Bridge to Heidelberg on 31 July 1921; To Eltham on 15 April 1923; To Hurstbridge on 2 August 1926

Technical
- Line length: 36.7 km (22.80 mi)
- Num of tracks: Double track: Flinders Street to Montmorency; Diamond Creek to Wattle Glen; Single track: Montmorency to Diamond Creek; Wattle Glen to Hurstbridge
- Track gauge: 1,600 mm (5 ft 3 in)
- Electrification: 1500 V DC overhead
- Operating speed: 80 km/h (50 mph) – Electric
- Signalling: Automatic block signalling
- Maximum incline: 1 in 40 (2.5%)

The Hurstbridge line forms a highly curved route from Flinders Street railway station in Melbourne CBD to its terminus at Hurstbridge. The route is 36.7 kilometres (22.8 mi) long and is double track up to Montmorency, with an additional section of double track between Wattle Glen and Diamond Creek; the remainder of the line is single track. The Hurstbridge line traverses both flat and hilly country with large amounts of curves and fairly significant earthworks for large parts of the line. The line uses the Clifton Hill tunnel of the City Loop, and travels through the only other three railway tunnels on the Victorian electrified network, although none of them are particularly long or deep. Sections of the line have been elevated onto a rail bridge or lowered into a cutting to eliminate level crossings. The line features four of the largest bridges on the suburban network: twin bridges over the Merri Creek running between Clifton Hill and Westgarth station, another on the up side of Darebin station, crossing the Darebin Creek, and the heritage-listed wooden trestle bridge running across the Diamond Creek in Eltham. At 195 m (640 ft) in length, this bridge is one of the longest curved wooden trestle bridge in use on a revenue railway in the southern hemisphere, and is the only wooden bridge still in use on a revenue railway in Melbourne. Despite some removals, there are a large number of level crossings still present with no current plans to remove them, including a few private level crossings towards the end of the line.

The line follows the same alignment as the Mernda line up to Clifton Hill. After departing Clifton Hill, the Mernda line heads north with the Hurstbridge line taking a windy alignment heading in an eastern direction. Almost all of the line goes through built-up suburbs, however, the line becomes more peri-urban towards its terminus in Hurstbridge.

=== Stations ===
The line serves 28 stations across 36.7 kilometres (22.8 mi) of track. The stations are a mix of elevated, lowered, underground, and ground level designs. Underground stations are present only in the City Loop, with the majority of elevated and lowered stations being constructed as part of level crossing removals.

Station	Accessibility	Opened	Terrain	Train connections	Other connections
Flinders Street	Yes—step free access	1854	Lowered	13 connections: Alamein line; Belgrave line; Craigieburn line; Flemington Racecourse line; Frankston line; Gippsland line; Glen Waverley line; Lilydale line; Mernda line; Sandringham line; Upfield line; Werribee line; Williamstown line	Trams Buses
Southern Cross	Yes—step free access	1859	Ground level	25 connections: Alamein line; Albury line; Ararat line; Ballarat line; Belgrave line; Bendigo line; Craigieburn line; Echuca line; Flemington Racecourse line; Frankston line; Geelong line; Gippsland line; Glen Waverley line; Lilydale line; Maryborough line; Mernda line; NSW TrainLink Southern; Seymour line; Shepparton line; Swan Hill line; The Overland; Upfield line; Warrnambool line; Werribee line; Williamstown line	Trams Buses Coaches SkyBus
Flagstaff	Yes—step free access	1985	Underground	8 connections: Alamein line; Belgrave line; Craigieburn line; Frankston line; Glen Waverley line; Lilydale line; Mernda line; Upfield line	Trams
Melbourne Central	Yes—step free access	1981	Underground	8 connections: Alamein line; Belgrave line; Craigieburn line; Frankston line; Glen Waverley line; Lilydale line; Mernda line; Upfield line	Trams Buses
Parliament	Yes—step free access	1983	Underground	8 connections: Alamein line; Belgrave line; Craigieburn line; Frankston line; Glen Waverley line; Lilydale line; Mernda line; Upfield line	Trams
Jolimont	Yes—step free access	1901	Lowered	1 connection: Mernda line	Trams
West Richmond	Yes—step free access	1901	Ground level	1 connection: Mernda line	Buses
North Richmond	No—steep ramp	1901	Elevated	1 connection: Mernda line	Trams Buses
Collingwood	No—steep ramp	1901	Ground level	1 connection: Mernda line	Buses
Victoria Park	No—steep ramp	1888	Elevated	1 connection: Mernda line	Buses
Clifton Hill	No—steep ramp	1888	Ground level	1 connection: Mernda line	Buses
Westgarth	Yes—step free access	1888	Ground level		Trams Buses
Dennis	No—steep ramp	1924	Ground level		Buses
Fairfield	Yes—step free access	1888	Ground level		Buses
Alphington	No—steep ramp	1888	Ground level		Buses
Darebin	Yes—step free access	1922	Ground level		Buses
Ivanhoe	No—steep ramp	1888	Ground level		Buses
Eaglemont	No—steep ramp	1926	Ground level		
Heidelberg	No—steep ramp	1888	Ground level		Buses
Rosanna	Yes—step free access	1927	Elevated		Buses
Macleod	Yes—step free access	1911	Ground level		Buses
Watsonia	No—steep ramp	1924	Lowered		Buses
Greensborough	Yes—step free access	1902	Ground level		Buses
Montmorency	Yes—step free access	1923	Ground level		
Eltham	No—steep ramp	1902	Ground level		Buses
Diamond Creek	Yes—step free access	1912	Ground level		Buses
Wattle Glen	Yes—step free access	1912	Ground level		Buses
Hurstbridge	Yes—step free access	1912	Ground level		Buses

Station histories
Station	Opened	Closed	Age	Notes
Parliament	22 January 1983		43 years	
Melbourne Central	26 January 1981		45 years	Formerly Museum
Flagstaff	27 May 1985		41 years	
Southern Cross	17 January 1859		167 years	Formerly Batman's Hill; Formerly Spencer Street
Flinders Street	12 September 1854		172 years	Formerly Melbourne Terminus
Princes Bridge	8 February 1859	1 October 1866	7 years	
Princes Bridge	2 April 1879	30 June 1980	101 years	
Jolimont	21 October 1901		125 years	
West Richmond	21 October 1901		125 years	
North Richmond	21 October 1901		125 years	
Collingwood	21 October 1901		125 years	Formerly Collingwood Town Hall
Victoria Park	8 May 1888		138 years	Formerly Collingwood
Clifton Hill	8 May 1888		138 years	
Westgarth	8 May 1888		138 years	Formerly Westgarth Street; Formerly Northcote South
Dennis	4 February 1924		102 years	
Fairfield	8 May 1888		138 years	Formerly Fairfield Park
APM Siding	27 July 1919	1994	75 years	
Alphington	8 May 1888		138 years	
Darebin	8 May 1922		104 years	
Ivanhoe	8 May 1888		138 years	
Eaglemont	1 May 1926		100 years	
Heidelberg	8 May 1888		138 years	
Rosanna	1 October 1927		99 years	
Macleod	1 March 1911		115 years	
Watsonia	23 June 1924		102 years	
Greensborough	5 June 1902		124 years	
Montmorency	5 September 1923		103 years	
Eltham	5 June 1902		124 years	
Diamond Creek	25 June 1912		114 years	
Wattle Glen	25 June 1912		114 years	Formerly Balee; Formerly Wattleglen
Hurstbridge	25 June 1912		114 years	Formerly Hurst's Bridge

== Infrastructure ==
=== Rolling stock ===
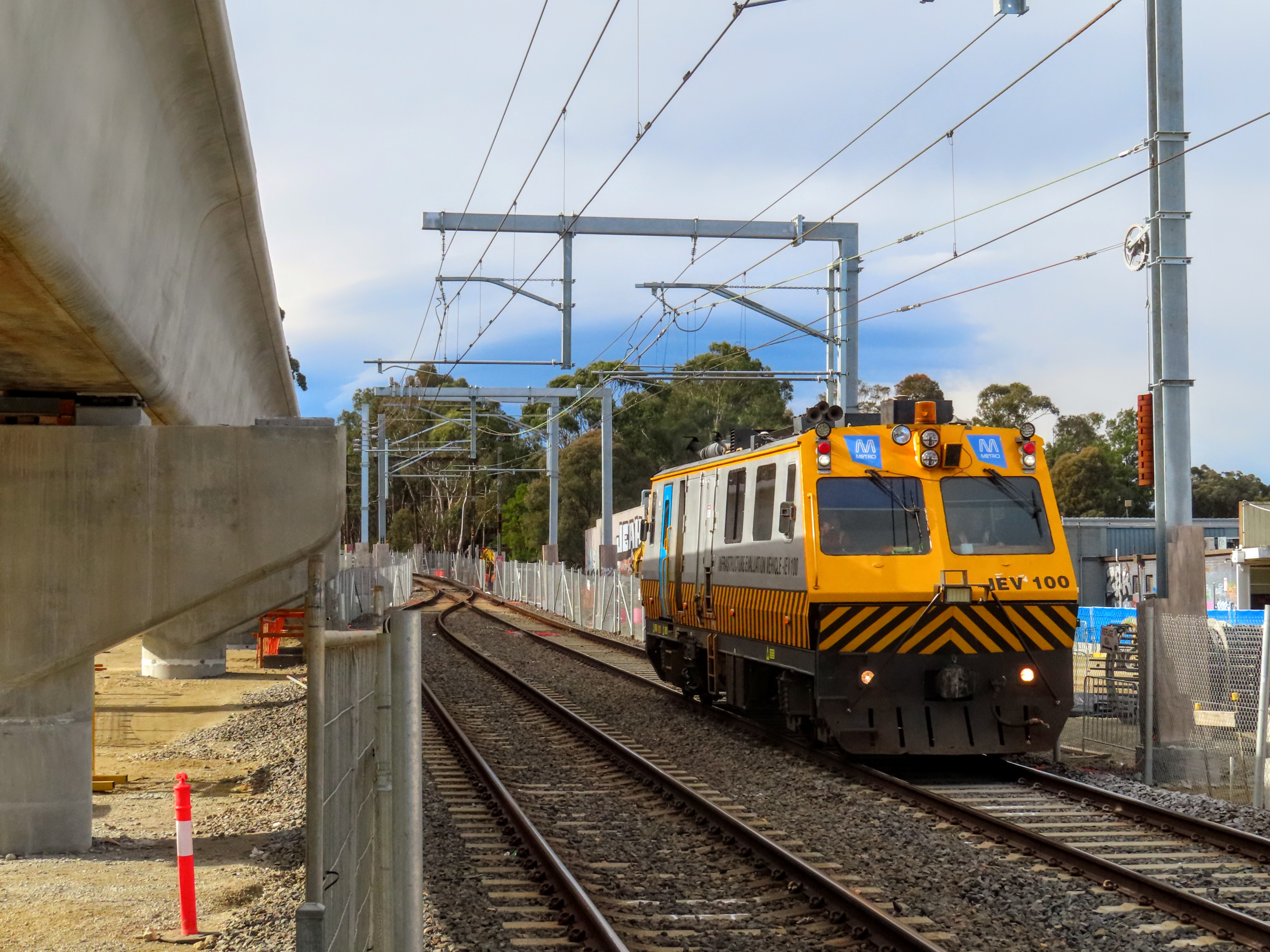
One of Metro Trains Melbourne's infrastructure evaluation vehicles, the IEV100 used to evaluate the condition of the track, shown here on the Lilydale line

The Hurstbridge line uses X'Trapolis 100 electric multiple unit (EMU) trains operating in a two three-car configuration, with three doors per side on each carriage and can accommodate of up to 432 seated passengers in each six car configuration. The trains were originally built between 2002 and 2004 as well as between 2009 and 2020 with a total of 212 three-car sets constructed. The trains are shared with 7 other metropolitan train lines and have been in service since 2003.

Alongside the passenger trains, Hurstbridge line tracks and equipment are maintained by a fleet of engineering trains. The four types of engineering trains are: the shunting train; designed for moving trains along non-electrified corridors and for transporting other maintenance locomotives, for track evaluation; designed for evaluating track and its condition, the overhead inspection train; designed for overhead wiring inspection, and the infrastructure evaluation carriage designed for general infrastructure evaluation. Most of these trains are repurposed locomotives previously used by V/Line, Metro Trains, and the Southern Shorthaul Railroad.

=== Accessibility ===
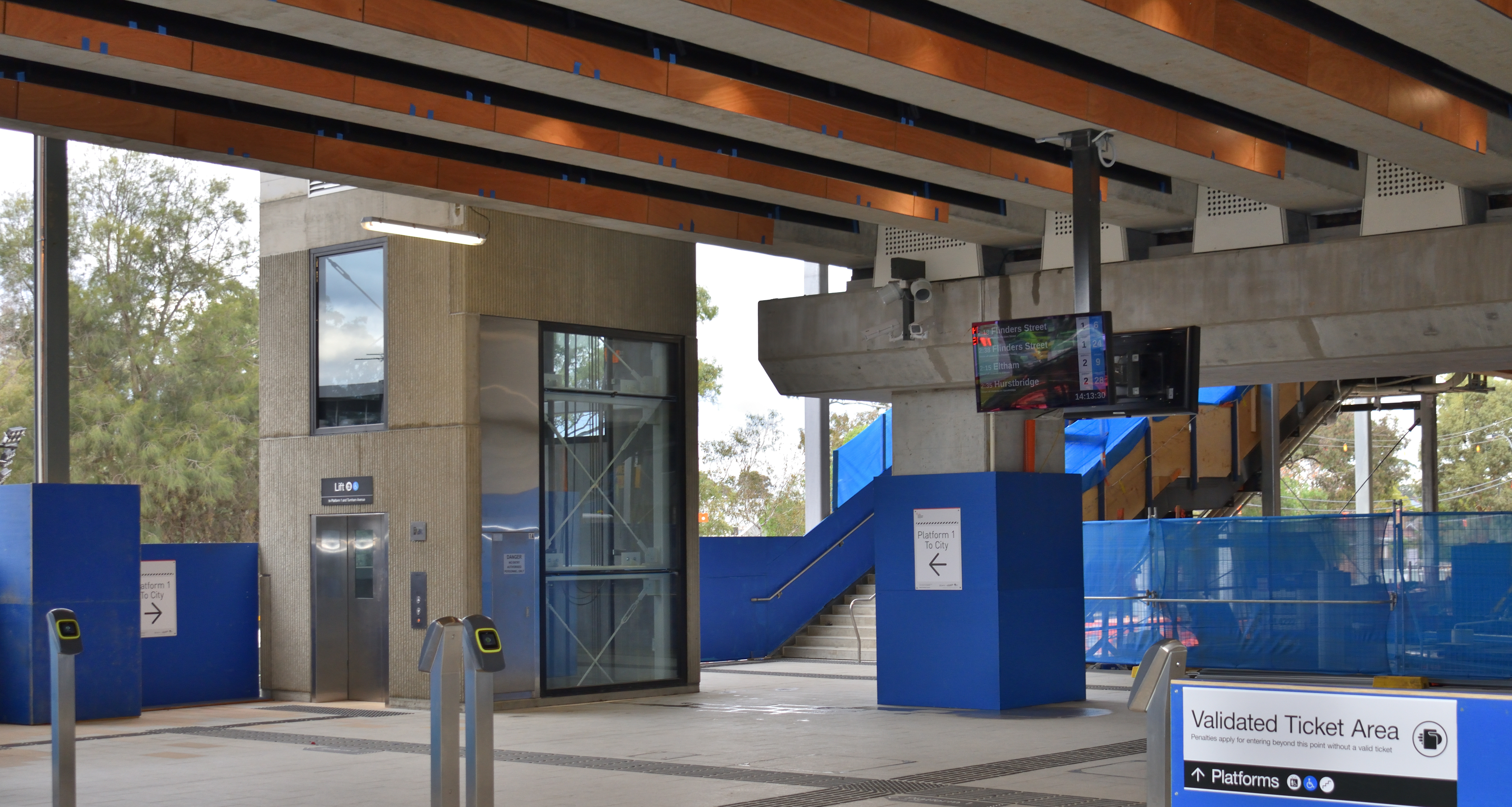
Rosanna station, rebuilt in 2018, includes lifts, tactile boarding indicators, and other accessible features.

In compliance with the Disability Discrimination Act of 1992, all stations that are new-built or rebuilt are fully accessible and comply with these guidelines. Just over half of the stations on the corridor are fully accessible, however, there are some stations that haven't been upgraded to meet these guidelines. These stations do feature ramps, however, they have a gradient greater than 1 in 14. Stations that are fully accessible feature ramps that have a gradient less than 1 in 14, have at-grade paths, or feature lifts. These stations typically also feature tactile boarding indicators, independent boarding ramps, wheelchair accessible myki barriers, hearing loops, and widened paths.

Projects improving station accessibility have included the Level Crossing Removal Project, which involves station rebuilds and upgrades, and individual station upgrade projects. These works have made significant strides in improving network accessibility, with more than 61% of Hurstbridge line stations classed as fully accessible. Future station upgrade projects will continue to increase the number of fully accessible stations over time.

=== Signalling ===
The Hurstbridge line uses three position signalling which is widely used across the Melbourne train network. Three position signalling was first introduced on the line in 1921, with the final section of the line converted to the new type of signalling in 2013. Until early 2013, the Hurstbridge line was the last electrified railway in Melbourne to use a token system of safeworking. The Greensborough to Eltham section was controlled by the miniature electric staff system, and Eltham to Hurstbridge section by the staff and ticket system. If required, the latter section could be divided into two at Diamond Creek, to allow trains to cross at that station. In conjunction with these systems, trains through Greensborough, Eltham, and Hurstbridge stations continued to be controlled by some semaphore signals. In the first few months of 2013, the staff systems and semaphore signals were replaced by electronic three-position coloured light signalling, controlled remotely from Epping. The Greensborough-Diamond Creek section was converted on 3 February 2013, and the Diamond Creek-Hurstbridge section was converted on 22 March 2013.
