= Hurstbridge railway station =

Railway station in Melbourne, Australia

Hurstbridge
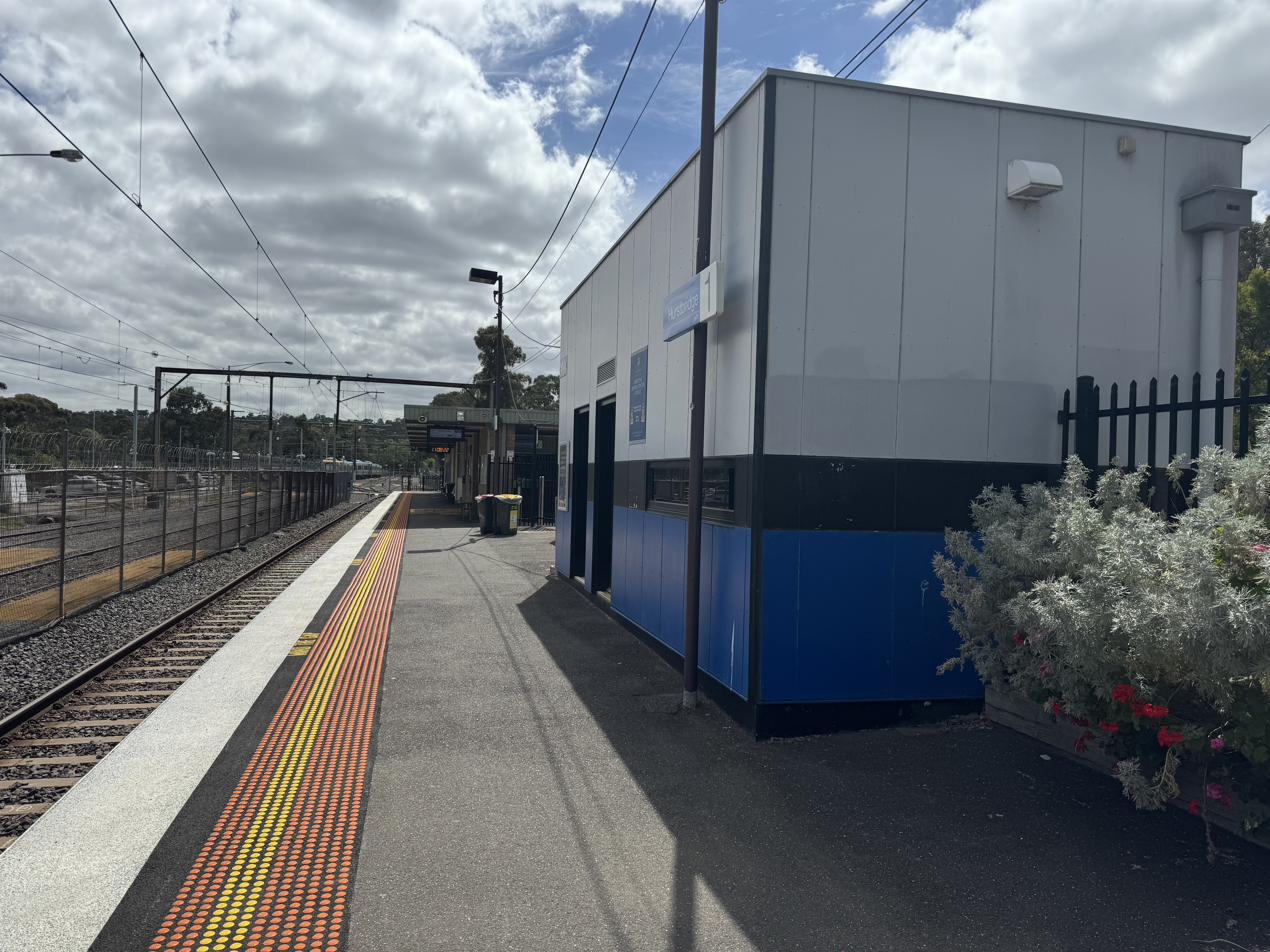
- Southbound view from the station platform, November 2024

General information
- Location: Heidelberg-Kinglake Road, Hurstbridge, Victoria 3099; Shire of Nillumbik; Australia
- Coordinates: 37°38′21″S 145°11′32″E
- System: PTV commuter rail station
- Owner: VicTrack
- Operator: Metro Trains
- Line: Hurstbridge
- Distance: 38.02 kilometres from Southern Cross
- Platforms: 1
- Tracks: 1
- Connections: Bus

Construction
- Structure type: Ground
- Parking: 195
- Cycle facilities: Yes
- Accessible: Yes — step free access

Other information
- Status: Operational, host station
- Station code: HBE
- Fare zone: Myki zone 2
- Website: Public Transport Victoria

History
- Opened: 25 June 1912; 114 years ago
- Electrified: August 1926 (1500 V DC overhead)
- Former names: Hurst's Bridge (1912)

Passengers
- 2005–2006: 197,942
- 2006–2007: 207,005 ▲4.57%
- 2007–2008: 236,995 ▲14.48%
- 2008–2009: 256,487 ▲8.22%
- 2009–2010: 257,216 ▲0.28%
- 2010–2011: 269,703 ▲4.85%
- 2011–2012: 250,889 ▼6.97%
- 2012–2013: Not measured
- 2013–2014: 130,851 ▼47.84%
- 2014–2015: 127,504 ▼2.55%
- 2015–2016: 139,066 ▲9.06%
- 2016–2017: 140,904 ▲1.32%
- 2017–2018: 119,790 ▼14.98%
- 2018–2019: 123,136 ▲2.79%
- 2019–2020: 98,200 ▼20.25%
- 2020–2021: 50,350 ▼48.72%
- 2021–2022: 57,050 ▲13.3%
- 2022–2023: 67,900 ▲19.02%
- 2023–2024: 82,350 ▲21.28%
- 2024–2025: 75,700 ▼8.08%

Services
Preceding station	Metro Trains	Following station
Wattle Glen towards Flinders Street	Hurstbridge line	Terminus
Track layout
Location

Hurstbridge station is a railway station operated by Metro Trains Melbourne and the terminus of the Hurstbridge line, part of the Melbourne rail network. It serves the north-eastern suburb of Hurstbridge, in Melbourne, Victoria, Australia. Hurstbridge station is a ground level host station, featuring a single platform. It opened on 25 June 1912.

Initially opened as Hurst's Bridge, the station was given its current name of Hurstbridge on 9 December 1912.

== History ==
Hurstbridge station opened on 25 June 1912, when the railway line was extended from Eltham. Like the suburb itself, the station was named after a local settler, Henry Hurst, who built a log bridge across the Diamond Creek to access a property named Allwood.

In 1957, a goods train service between Eltham and Hurstbridge was withdrawn. In 1962, a siding that operated to a cool store was abolished.

=== Accidents and incidents ===
On 16 February 1973, Tait trailer carriage 202T was destroyed by a fire while stabled in No. 1 road.

On 9 April 1983, Comeng motor carriage 315M and Tait motor carriage 472M were destroyed by a fire whilst at the station. Both cars were later scrapped.

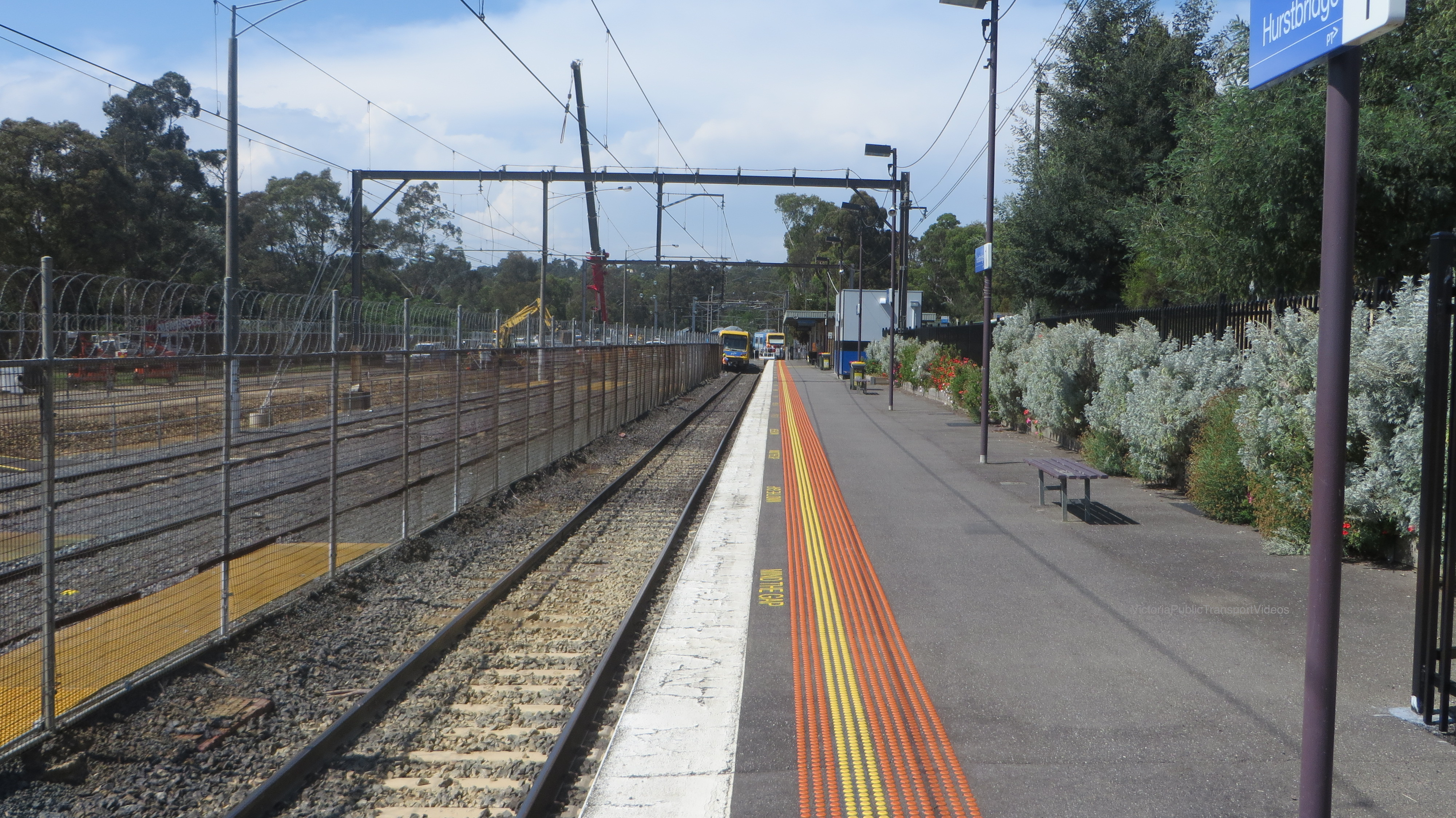
Photo of the station in 2015 with the crashed X'Trapolis in the background

Shortly before 2:00 a.m. on 11 November 2015, X'Trapolis train set 927M-1664T-928M derailed, following an unauthorised movement from the yard, resulting in collisions with various items of infrastructure and another train. On 1 June 2016, a former Metro Trains' worker pleaded guilty to causing the incident, along with lighting two fires at Newport Workshops in 2015, which damaged or destroyed heritage train carriages, including a historical Swing Door EMU.

== Platforms and services ==
Hurstbridge has one platform. It is served by Hurstbridge line trains.

Hurstbridge platform arrangement
Platform	Line	Destination	Service Type	Source
1	Hurstbridge line	Flinders Street	All stations and limited express services	

== Transport links ==
Kinetic Melbourne operates one bus route to and from Hurstbridge station, under contract to Transport Victoria:

- 343 : to Greensborough station
