= Westgarth railway station =

Railway station in Melbourne, Australia

Westgarth
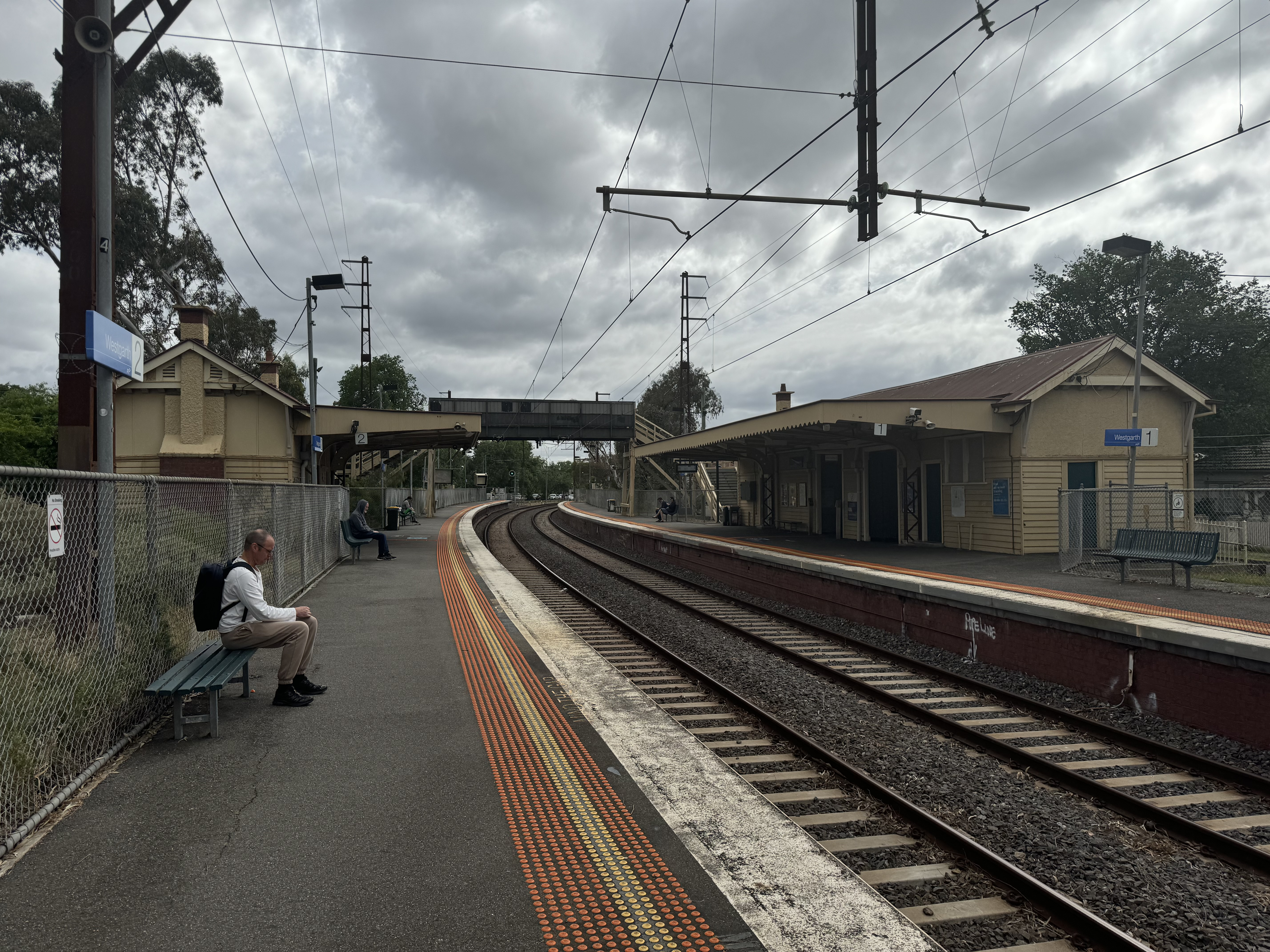
- North-east bound view from Platform 2, November 2024

General information
- Location: Evans Crescent, Northcote, Victoria 3070; City of Darebin; Australia
- Coordinates: 37°46′51″S 144°59′57″E
- System: PTV commuter rail station
- Owner: VicTrack
- Operator: Metro Trains
- Line: Hurstbridge
- Distance: 7.55 kilometres from Southern Cross
- Platforms: 2 side
- Tracks: 2
- Connections: Bus; Tram

Construction
- Structure type: Ground
- Parking: 22
- Cycle facilities: 5
- Accessible: Yes—step free access

Other information
- Status: Operational, unstaffed
- Station code: WTG
- Fare zone: Myki zone 1
- Website: Public Transport Victoria

History
- Opened: 8 May 1888; 138 years ago
- Electrified: July 1921 (1500 V DC overhead)
- Former names: Westgarth Street (1888); Northcote South (1888-1906)

Passengers
- 2005–2006: 256,862
- 2006–2007: 269,208 ▲4.8%
- 2007–2008: 281,994 ▲4.74%
- 2008–2009: 292,978 ▲3.89%
- 2009–2010: 297,036 ▲1.38%
- 2010–2011: 323,125 ▲8.78%
- 2011–2012: 294,679 ▼8.8%
- 2012–2013: Not measured
- 2013–2014: 296,589 ▲0.64%
- 2014–2015: 307,759 ▲3.76%
- 2015–2016: 318,973 ▲3.64%
- 2016–2017: 339,690 ▲6.49%
- 2017–2018: 264,834 ▼22.04%
- 2018–2019: 298,000 ▲12.52%
- 2019–2020: 227,000 ▼23.83%
- 2020–2021: 108,300 ▼52.3%
- 2021–2022: 124,700 ▲15.14%

Services
Preceding station	Metro Trains	Following station
Clifton Hill towards Flinders Street	Hurstbridge line	Dennis towards Hurstbridge
Track layout
Location

Westgarth station is a railway station operated by Metro Trains Melbourne on the Hurstbridge line, part of the Melbourne rail network. It serves the north-eastern suburb of Northcote in Melbourne, Victoria, Australia. Westgarth station is a ground level unstaffed station, featuring two side platforms. It opened on 8 May 1888.

Initially opened as Westgarth Street, the station was renamed two times. It was renamed to Northcote South on 1 August 1888 and then given its current name of Westgarth on 10 December 1906.

== History ==
Westgarth station opened on 8 May 1888 as Westgarth Street, along the newly opened railway line between Collingwood and Heidelberg. Westgarth station, like the locality itself, was named after William Westgarth, a merchant, historian and a member of both the New South Wales Legislative Council and the Victorian Legislative Council. Shortly after, on 1 August 1888 the station's name was changed to Northcote South.

On 10 December 1906, the station was renamed from Northcote South to its current name, Westgarth. This was done to prevent confusion as there were several train stations in Northcote named after the suburb at the time.

In late 1912, whilst the line was being duplicated between Westgarth and Alphington. Westgarth was relocated from the up end to the down end; directly north of Westgarth Street where it remains today. The current weatherboard station buildings were also built at this time.

In 1913, complaints arose regarding the substandard facilities and the lack of staff and pedestrian crossing at the newly constructed station. Described as "an island in a sea of mud" commuters were said to "climb the fence and walked along the railway reserve, to save a walk a quarter of a mile." This prompted a timber footbridge to be constructed, which remains in the same place today.

In 1968, boom barriers replaced interlocked gates at the Westgarth Street level crossing, located at the up end of the station. The signal box for the level crossing was also abolished at that time.

During late 2008 and early 2009, 750 meters of single track between Westgarth and Clifton Hill was duplicated. This included a second bridge over the Merri Creek running parallel to the original 1888 rail bridge. On 27 January 2009, the duplicated track and bridge opened.

== Platforms and services ==
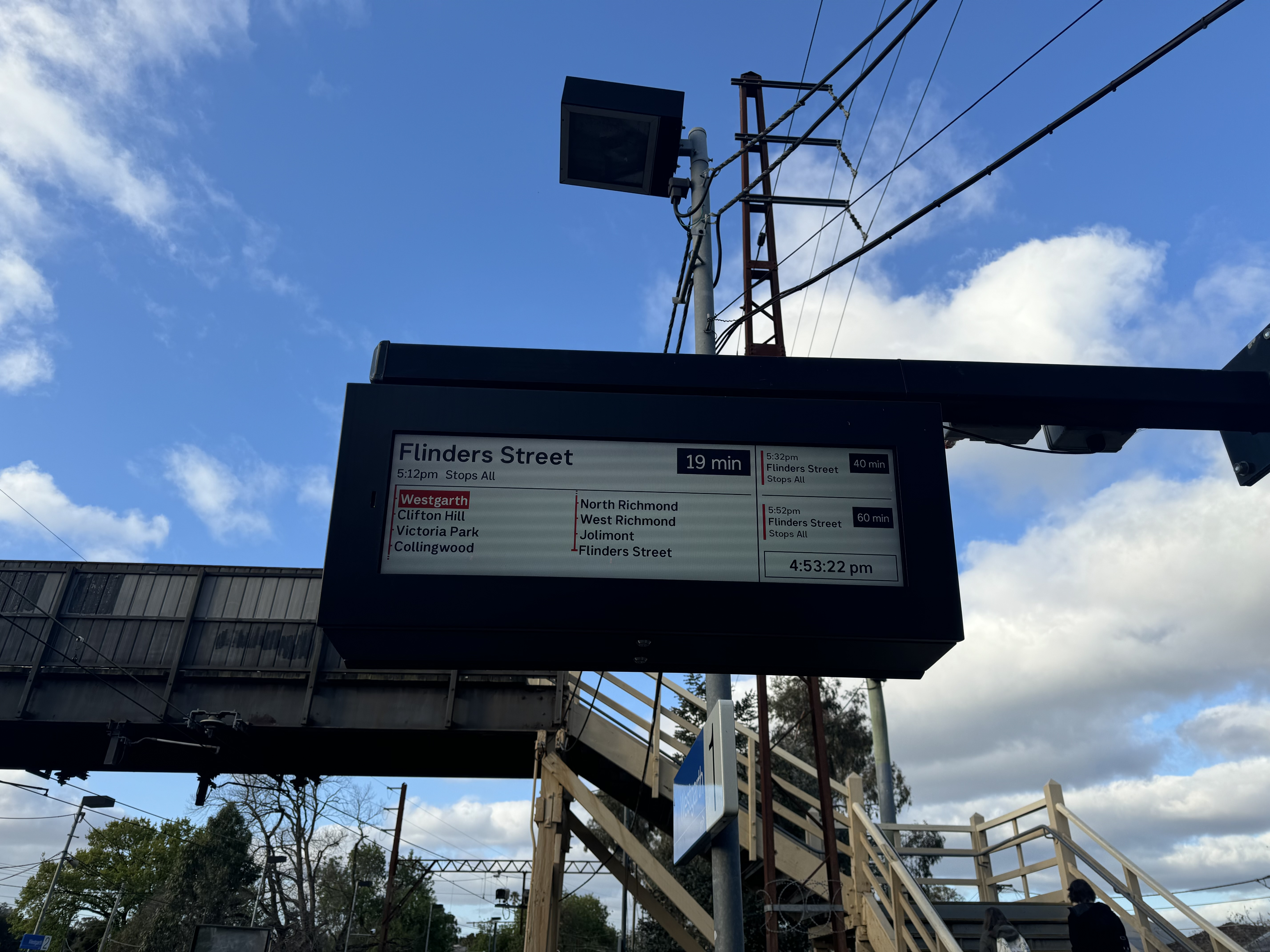
A PID on Platform 1 displaying a Flinders Street-bound service, September 2024

Westgarth has two side platforms. It is served by Hurstbridge line trains.

Westgarth platform arrangement
Platform	Line	Destination	Service Type	Source
1	Hurstbridge line	Flinders Street	All stations and limited express services	
2	Hurstbridge line	Macleod, Greensborough, Eltham or Hurstbridge	All stations	

== Transport links ==
Kinetic Melbourne operates three bus routes via Westgarth station:

- 250 : Queen Street (Melbourne CBD) – La Trobe University Bundoora campus
- 251 : Queen Street (Melbourne CBD) – Northland Shopping Centre
- 506 : to Moonee Ponds Junction

Yarra Trams operates one route via Westgarth station:

- : Bundoora RMIT – Waterfront City (Docklands)

== Gallery ==
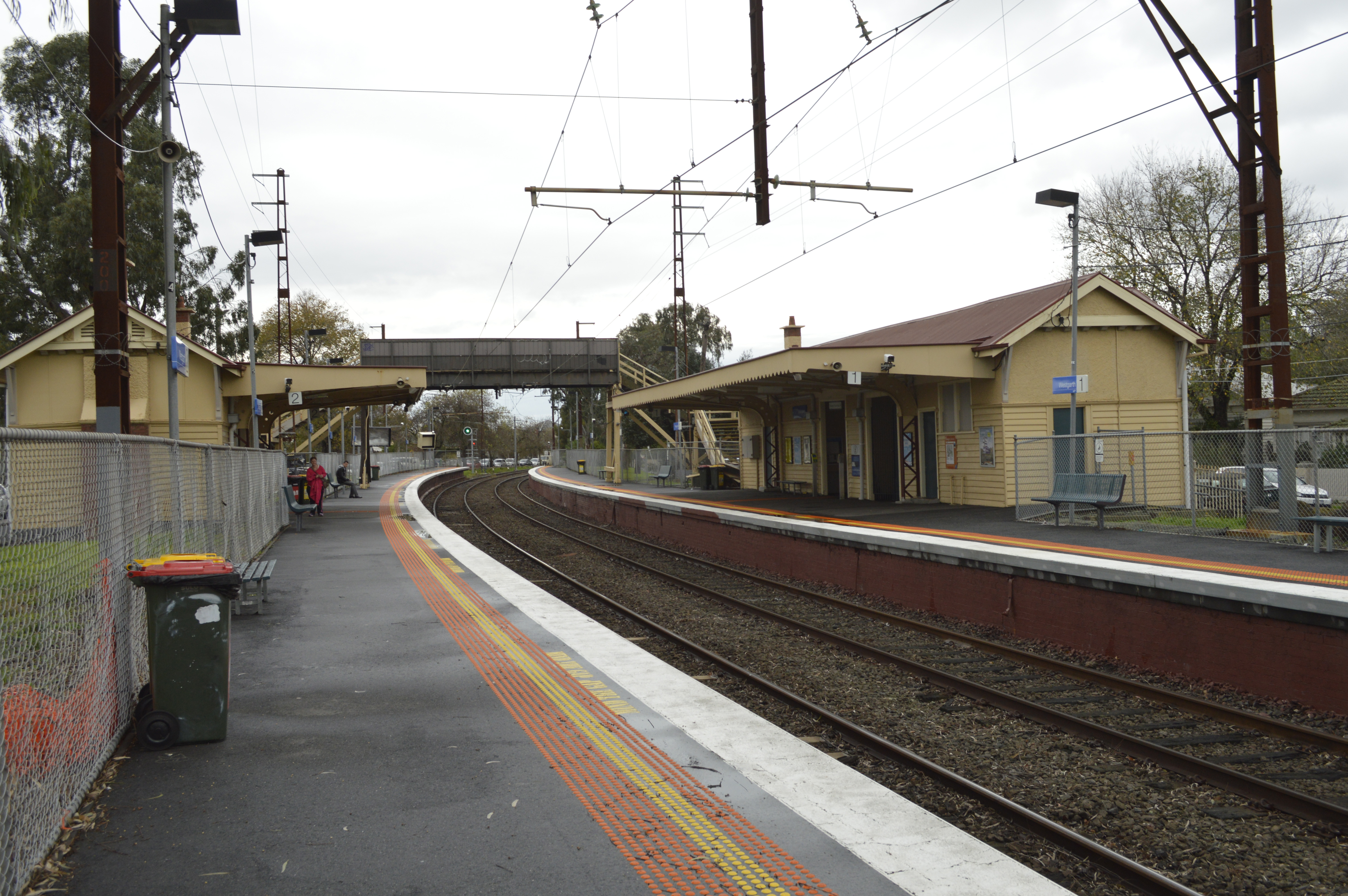
North-east bound view from Platform 2, May 2014

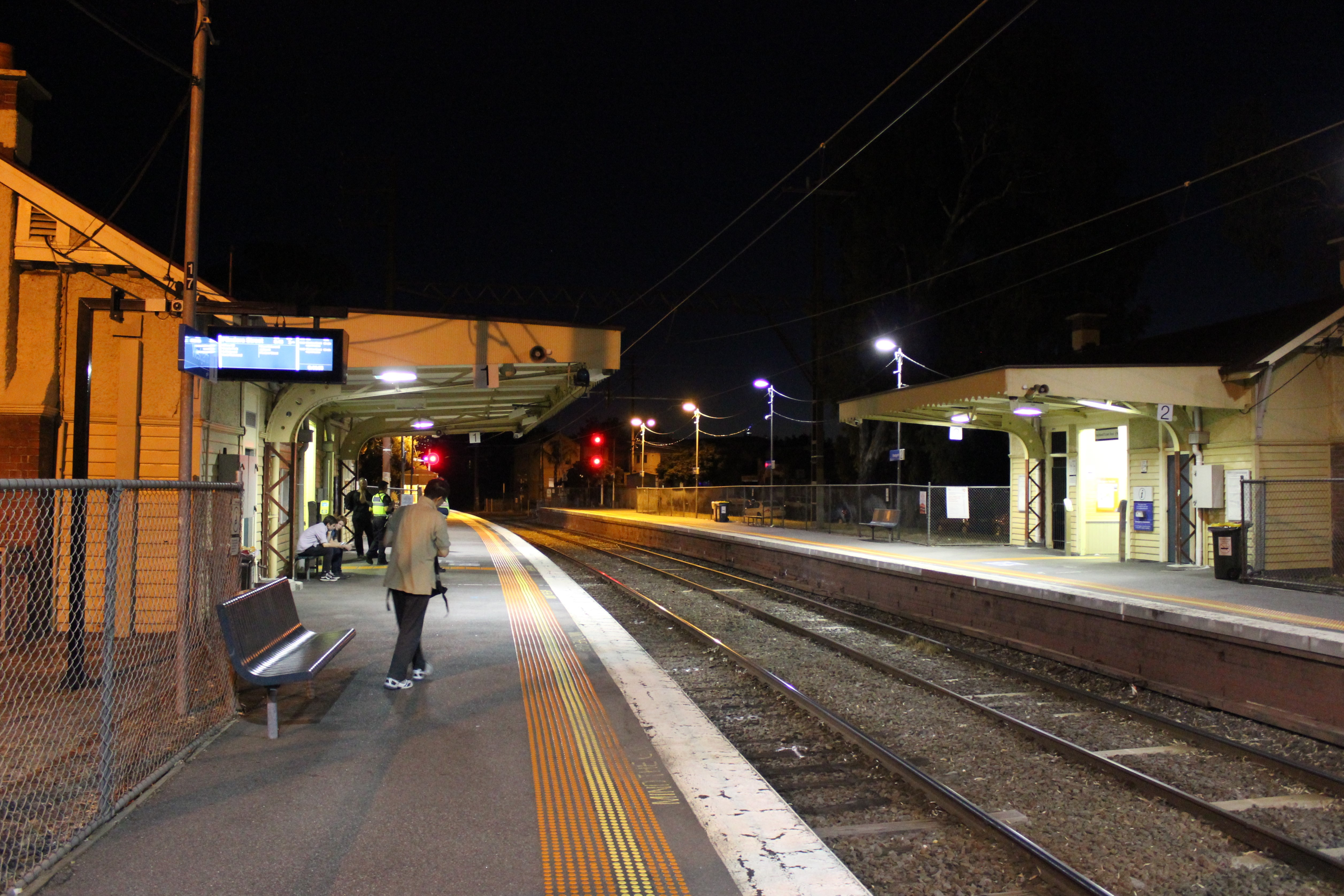
South-west bound view from Platform 1 at night, March 2018

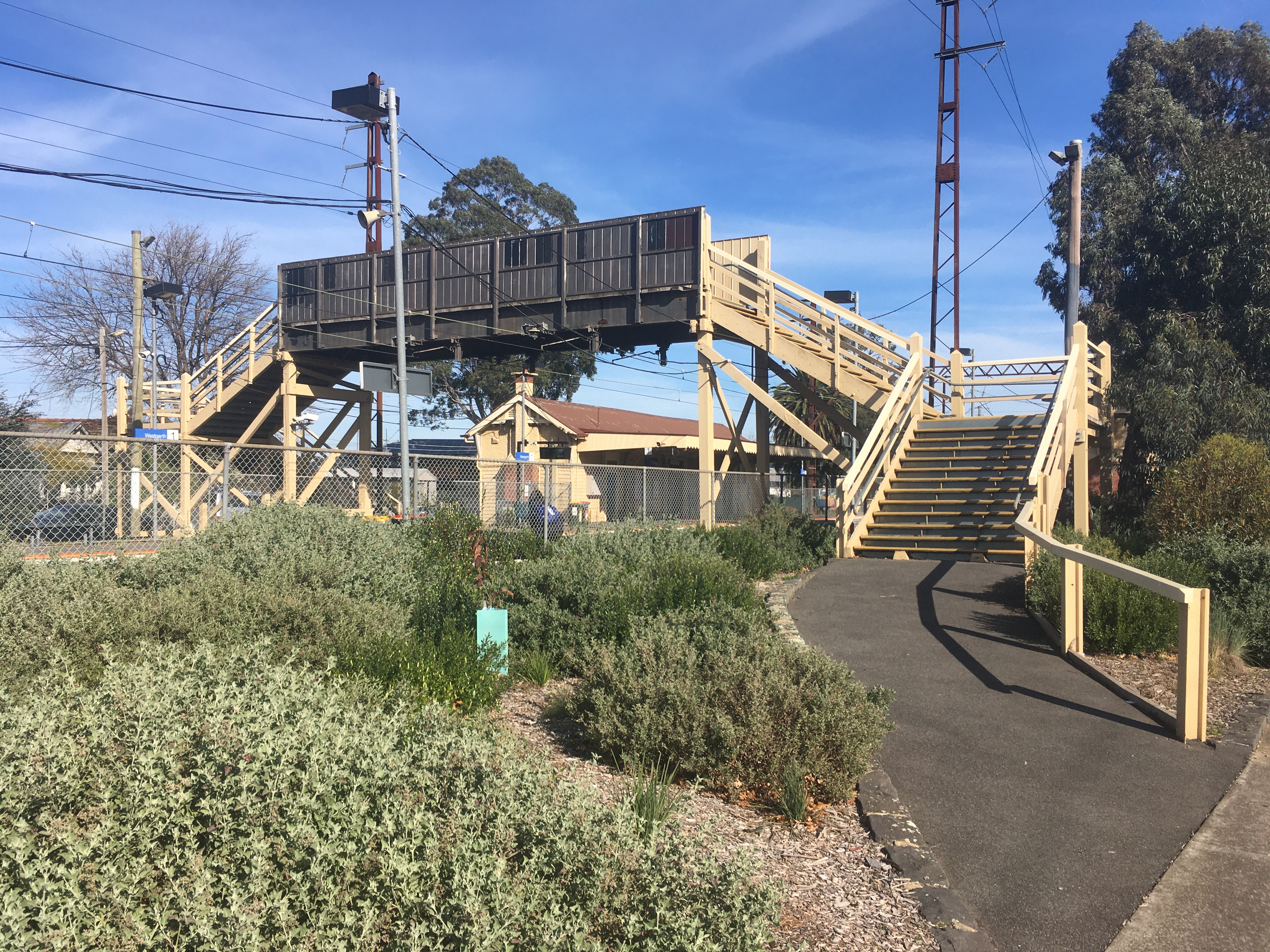
South-west bound view of Platform 2 and footbridge, July 2020

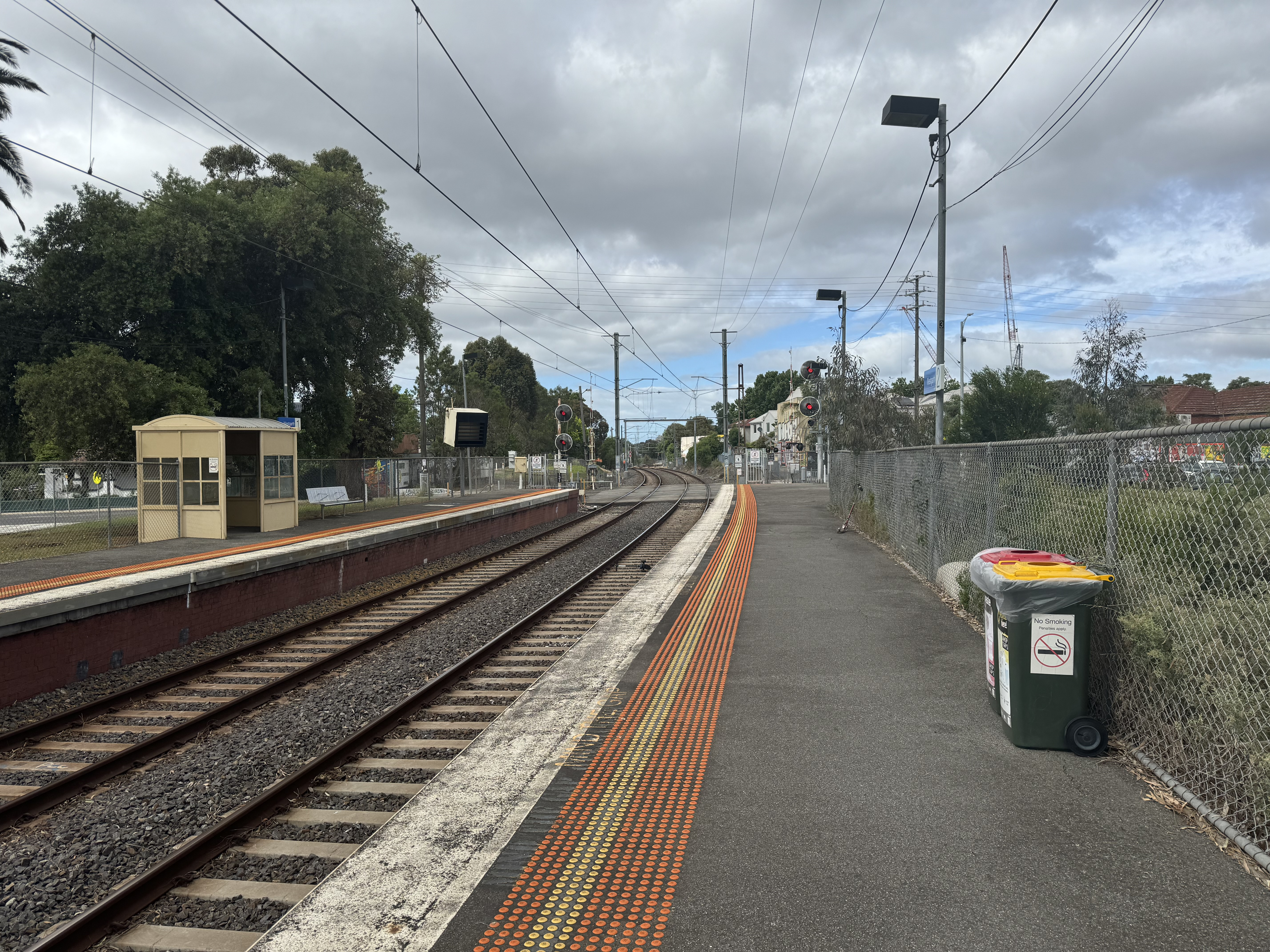
South-west bound view from Platform 2, with the Westgarth Street level crossing seen ahead, November 2024

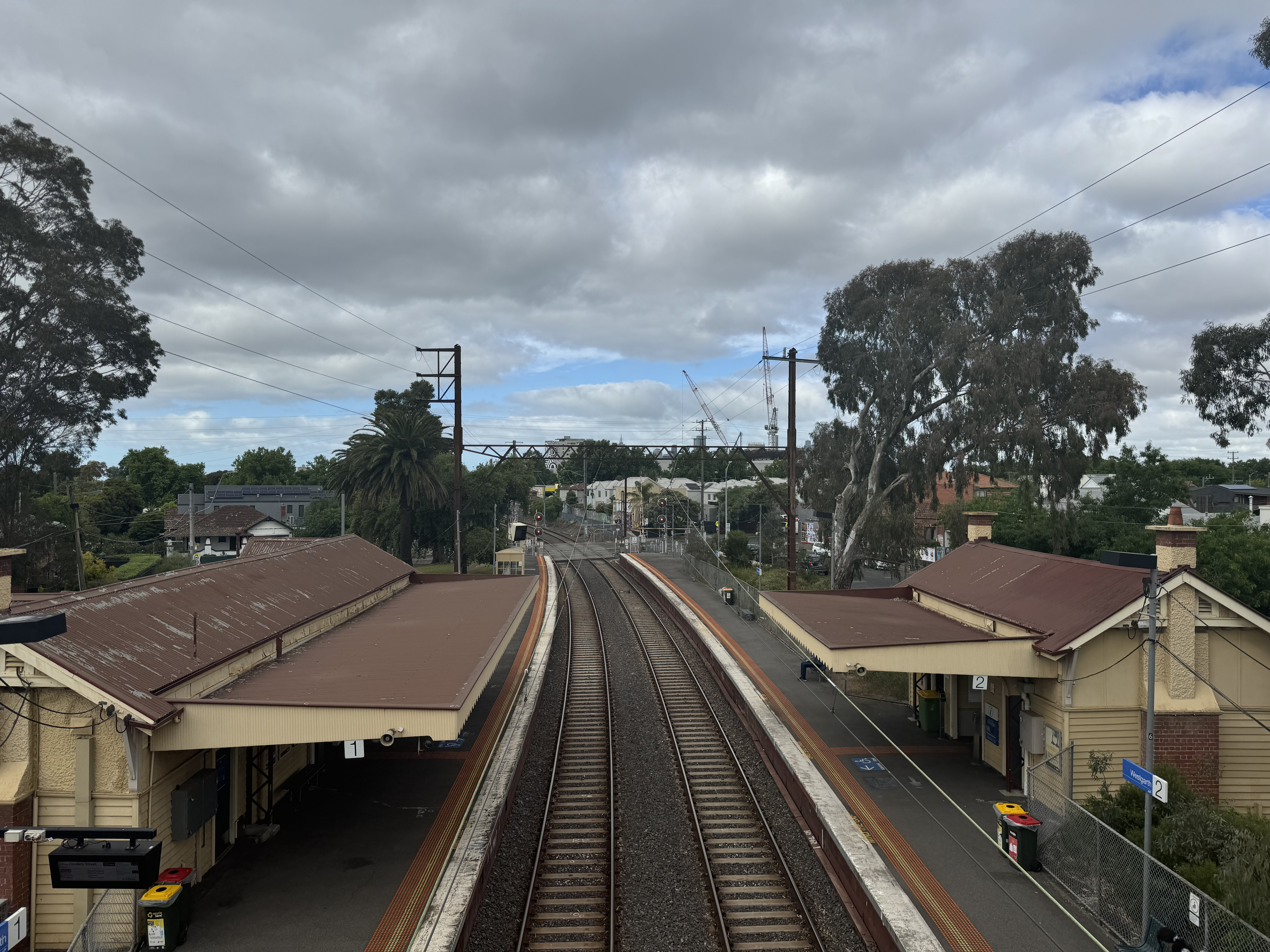
South-west bound view of the station platforms, November 2024

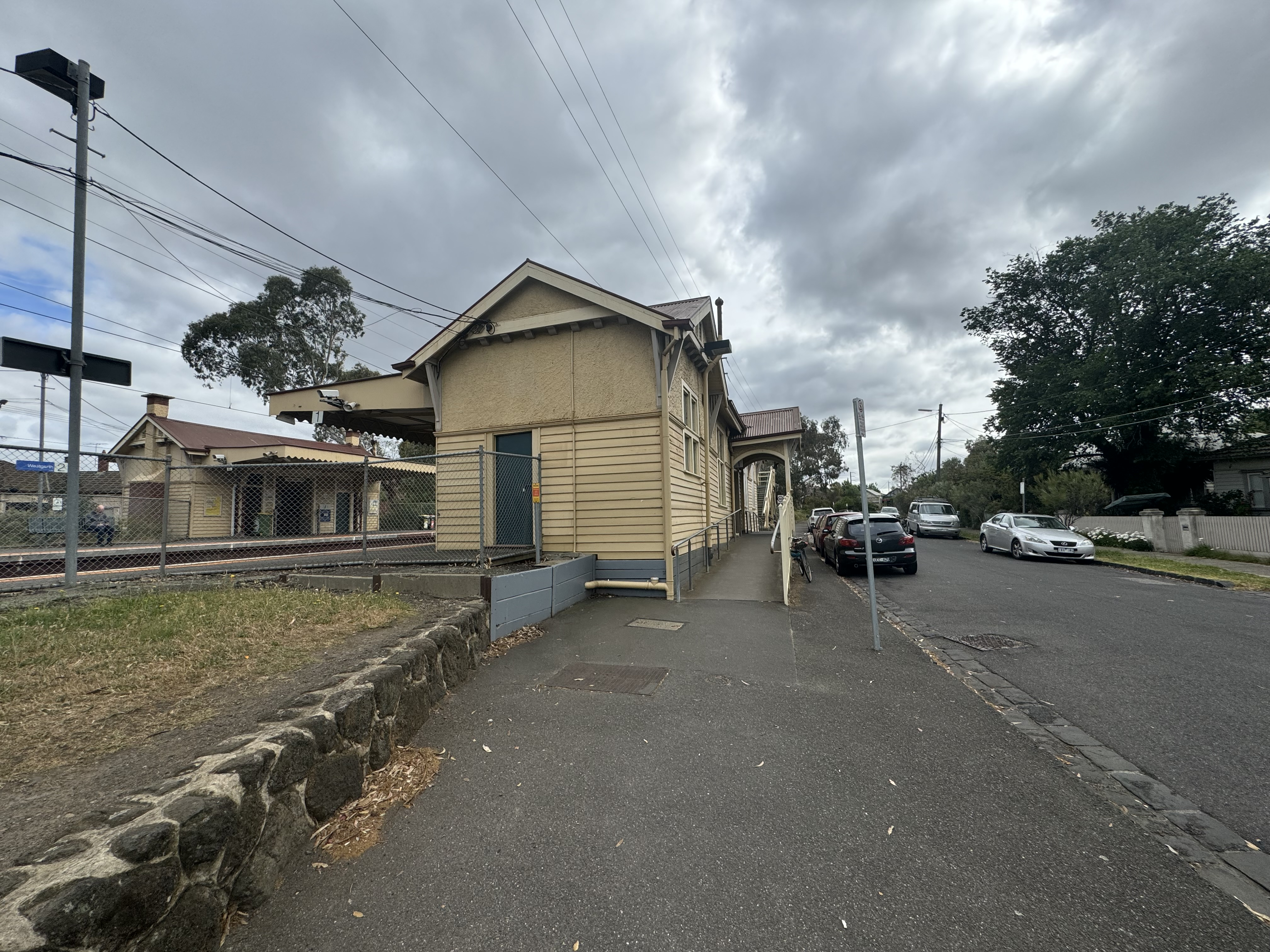
Station building and entrance to Platform 1, November 2024

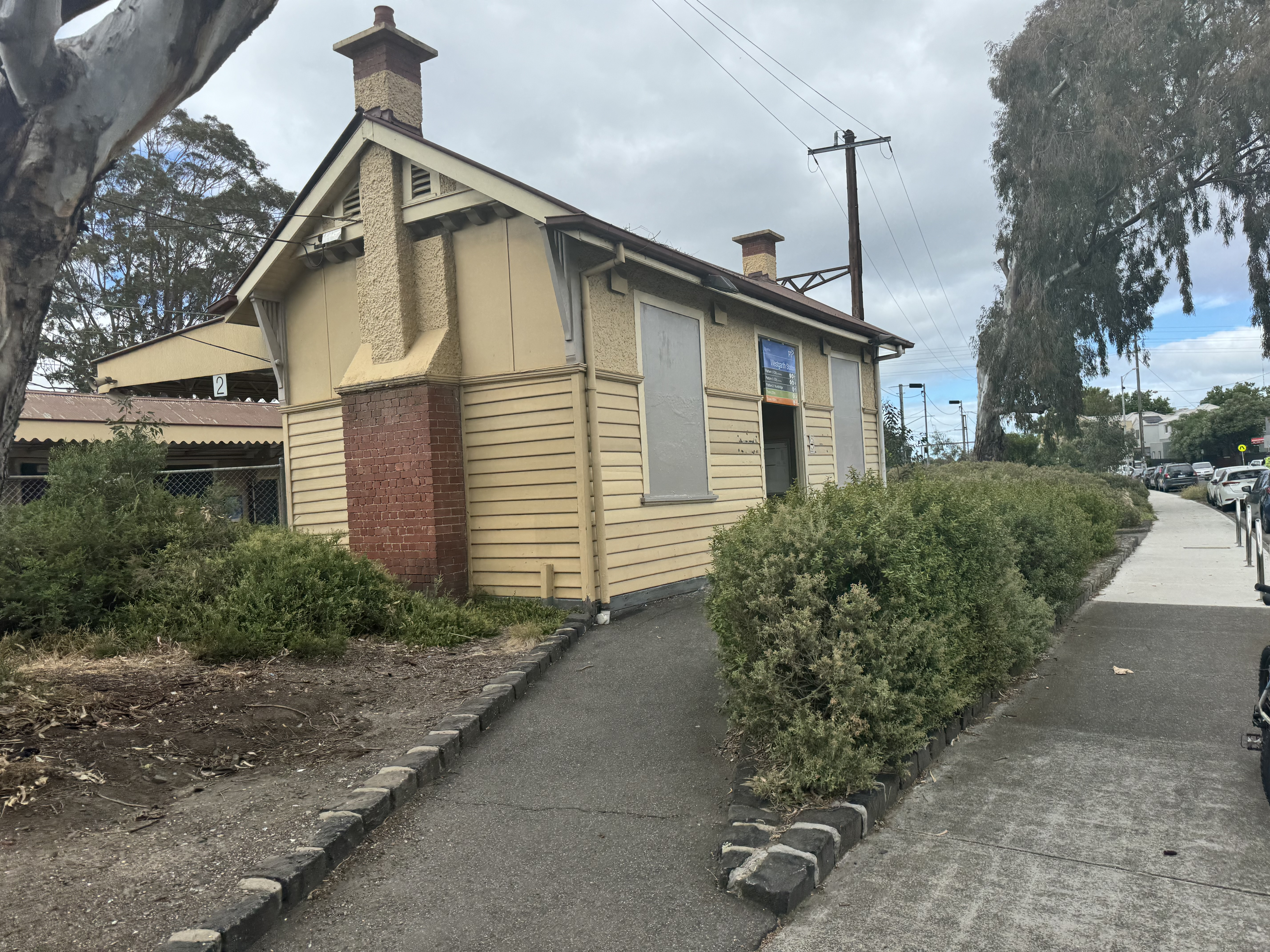
Station building and entrance to Platform 2, November 2024
