= Ivanhoe railway station, Melbourne =

Railway station in Melbourne, Australia

Ivanhoe
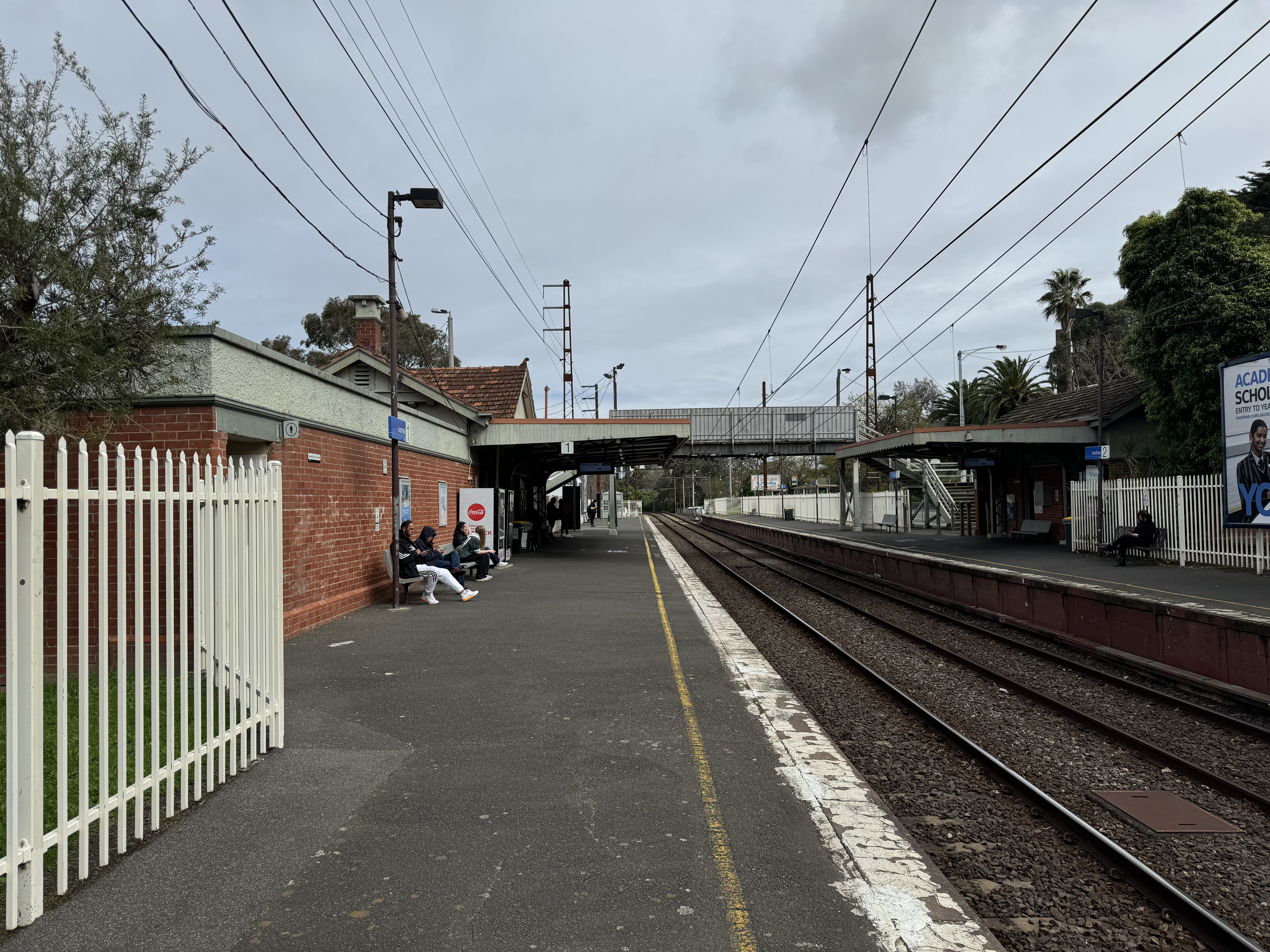
- Westbound view from Platform 1, August 2024

General information
- Location: Norman Street, Ivanhoe, Victoria 3079; City of Banyule; Australia
- Coordinates: 37°46′08″S 145°02′44″E
- System: PTV commuter rail station
- Owner: VicTrack
- Operator: Metro Trains
- Line: Hurstbridge
- Distance: 12.14 kilometres from Southern Cross
- Platforms: 2 side
- Tracks: 2
- Connections: Bus

Construction
- Structure type: Ground
- Parking: 297
- Cycle facilities: 20
- Accessible: No—steep ramp

Other information
- Status: Operational, premium station
- Station code: IVA
- Fare zone: Myki zone 1/2
- Website: Public Transport Victoria

History
- Opened: 8 May 1888; 138 years ago
- Electrified: July 1921 (1500 V DC overhead)

Passengers
- 2005–2006: 902,766
- 2006–2007: 933,457 ▲3.39%
- 2007–2008: 1,017,071 ▲8.95%
- 2008–2009: 984,827 ▼3.17%
- 2009–2010: 962,842 ▼2.23%
- 2010–2011: 989,020 ▲2.71%
- 2011–2012: 888,999 ▼10.11%
- 2012–2013: Not measured
- 2013–2014: 837,151 ▼5.83%
- 2014–2015: 798,870 ▼4.57%
- 2015–2016: 844,455 ▲5.7%
- 2016–2017: 817,684 ▼3.17%
- 2017–2018: 673,680 ▼17.61%
- 2018–2019: 781,014 ▲15.93%
- 2019–2020: 604,100 ▼22.65%
- 2020–2021: 273,050 ▼54.8%
- 2021–2022: 319,750 ▲17.1%

Services
Preceding station	Metro Trains	Following station
Darebin towards Flinders Street	Hurstbridge line	Eaglemont towards Hurstbridge
Clifton Hill towards Flinders Street	Hurstbridge line Weekday peak express services	Heidelberg towards Hurstbridge
Track layout
Location

Ivanhoe station is a railway station operated by Metro Trains Melbourne on the Hurstbridge line, part of the Melbourne rail network. It serves the north-eastern suburb of Ivanhoe, in Melbourne, Victoria, Australia. Ivanhoe station is a ground level premium station, featuring two side platforms. It opened on 8 May 1888.

== History ==
Ivanhoe station opened when the railway line between Collingwood and Heidelberg opened. Like the suburb itself, the station was named after the novel Ivanhoe, written in 1820 by author Sir Walter Scott.

In 1949, the line between Ivanhoe and Heidelberg was duplicated. In 1951, track duplication from Ivanhoe to Alphington was completed.

In 1960, boom barriers replaced interlocked gates at the Marshall Street level crossing, located nearby in the down direction from the station. The signal box controlling the level crossing gates was also abolished at that time. In 1979, the station received a minor upgrade.

On 21 June 1996, Ivanhoe was upgraded to a premium station.

== Facilities, platforms and services ==
Ivanhoe has two side platforms. There is a large red brick building on Platform 1, which includes an enclosed waiting area, ticket facilities and toilets, while Platform 2 has a smaller red brick building. There is a footbridge immediately west of the station buildings.

The station is served by Hurstbridge line trains.

Ivanhoe platform arrangement
Platform	Line	Destination	Service Type	Source
1	Hurstbridge line	Flinders Street	All stations and limited express services	
2	Hurstbridge line	Macleod, Greensborough, Eltham or Hurstbridge	All stations and limited express services	

== Transport links ==
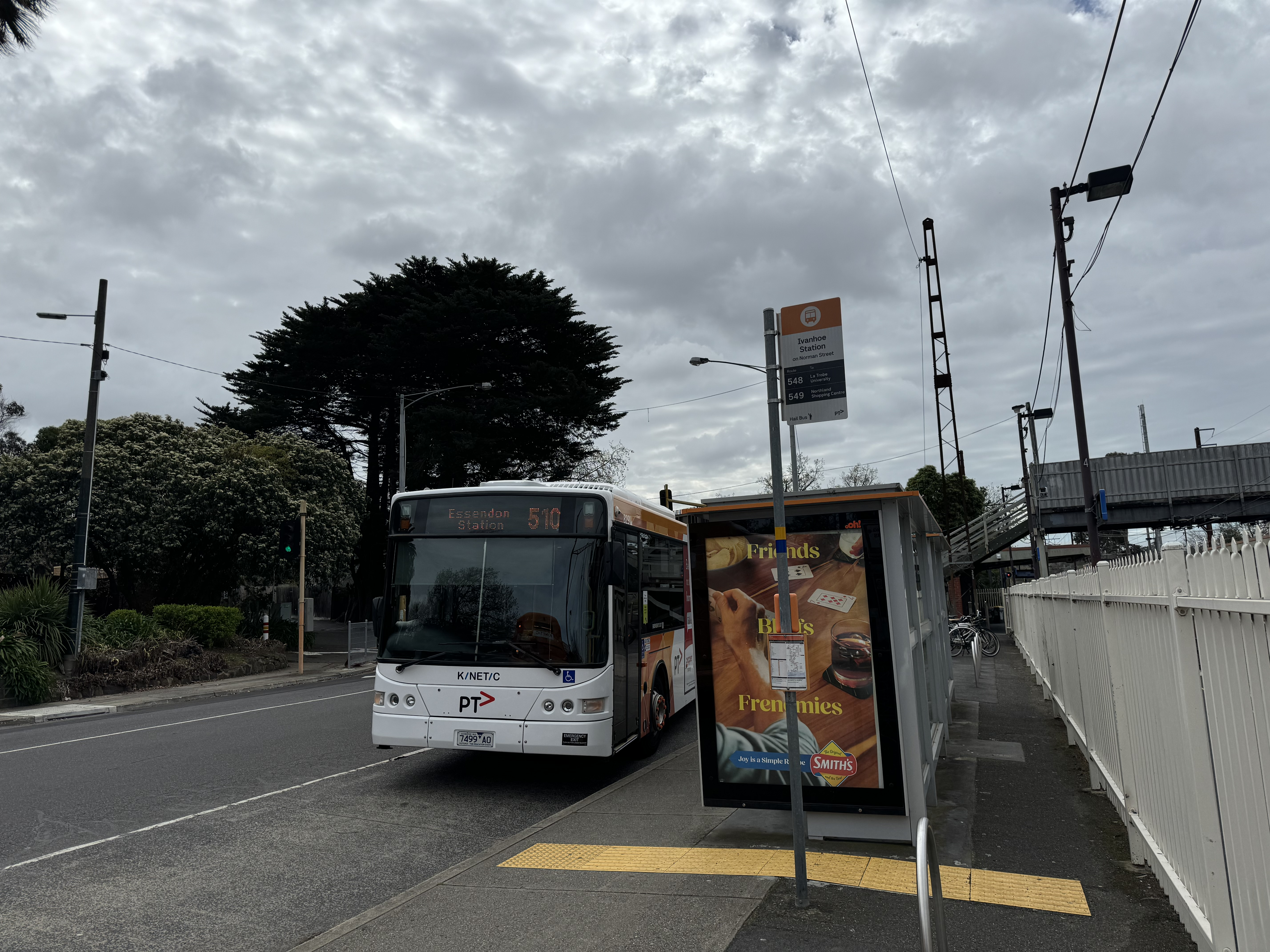
The bus interchange on Norman Street with a 510 Kinetic Melbourne bus at the stop, August 2024

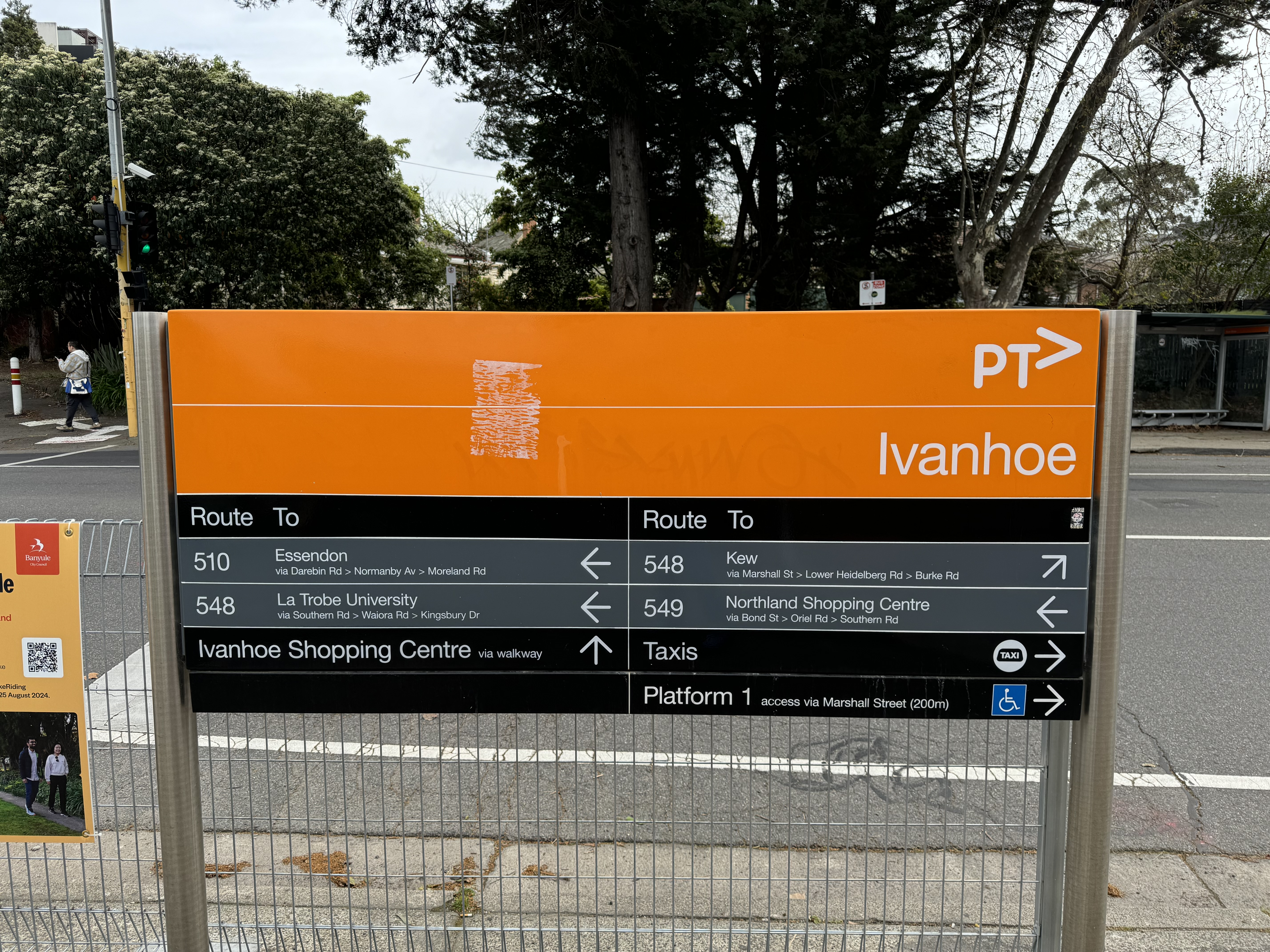
The bus interchange signage on Norman Street showing bus routes 510, 548 and 549, August 2024

Kinetic Melbourne operates one bus route to and from Ivanhoe station, under contract to Public Transport Victoria:

- 510 : to Essendon station

Ventura Bus Lines operates two routes via Ivanhoe station, under contract to Public Transport Victoria:

- 548 : Kew – La Trobe University Bundoora campus
- 549 : to Northland Shopping Centre
