= Clifton Hill railway station =

Railway station in Melbourne, Australia

Clifton Hill
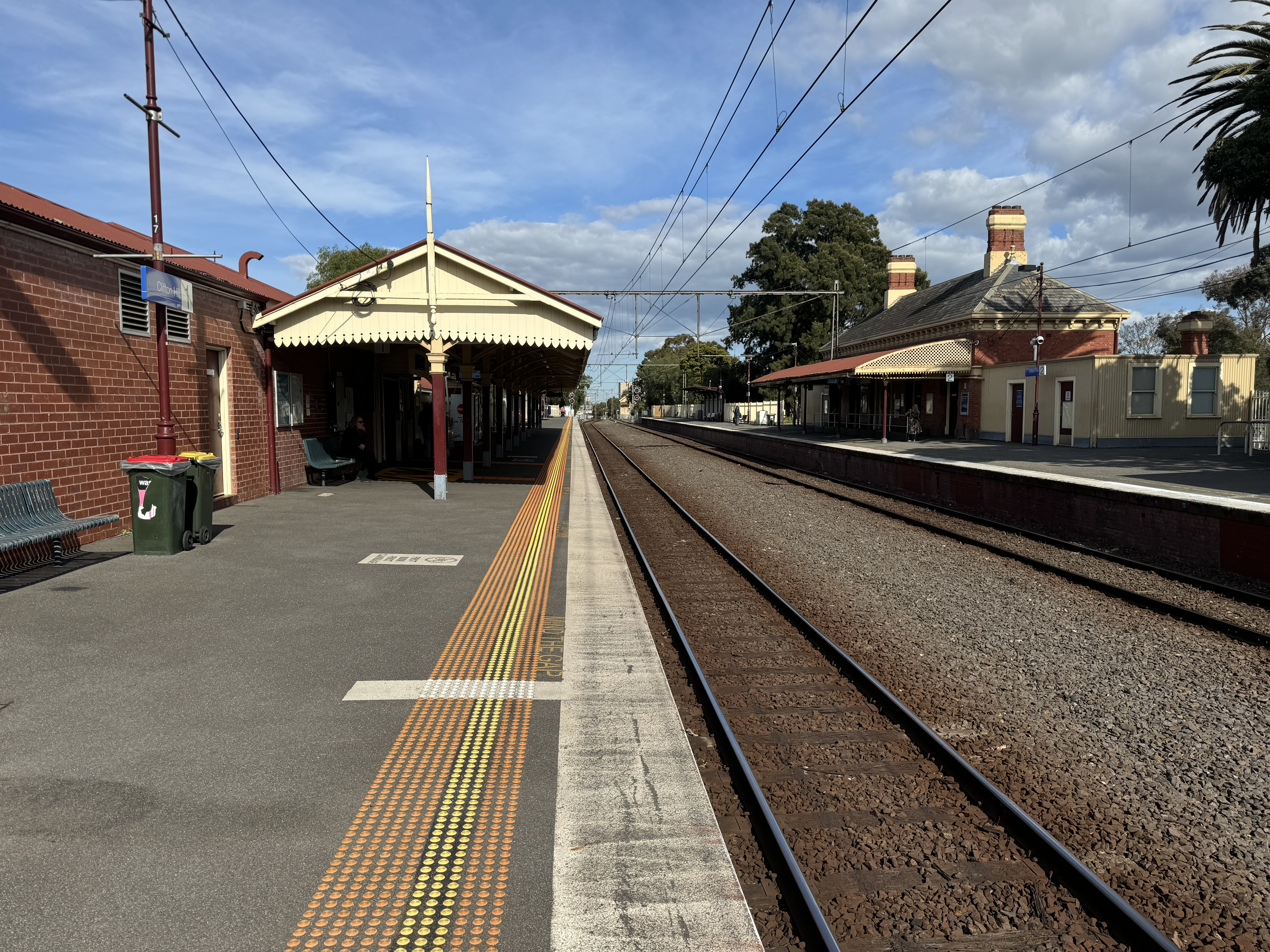
- Southbound view from Platform 1, August 2024

General information
- Location: Hoddle Street, Clifton Hill, Victoria 3068; City of Yarra; Australia
- Coordinates: 37°47′19″S 144°59′43″E
- System: PTV commuter rail station
- Owner: VicTrack
- Operator: Metro Trains
- Lines: Mernda; Hurstbridge
- Distance: 6.60 kilometres from Southern Cross
- Platforms: 2 side
- Tracks: 2
- Connections: Bus

Construction
- Structure type: Ground
- Parking: 90
- Cycle facilities: 17
- Accessible: No—steep ramp

Other information
- Status: Operational, premium station
- Station code: CHL
- Fare zone: Myki zone 1
- Website: Public Transport Victoria

History
- Opened: 8 May 1888; 138 years ago
- Rebuilt: 1990
- Electrified: July 1921 (1500 V DC overhead)

Passengers
- 2005–2006: 772,225
- 2006–2007: 802,205 ▲3.88%
- 2007–2008: 842,750 ▲5.05%
- 2008–2009: 1,001,215 ▲18.8%
- 2009–2010: 1,029,502 ▲2.82%
- 2010–2011: 1,087,791 ▲5.66%
- 2011–2012: 982,055 ▼9.72%
- 2012–2013: Not measured
- 2013–2014: 964,101 ▼1.82%
- 2014–2015: 916,334 ▼4.95%
- 2015–2016: 911,537 ▼0.52%
- 2016–2017: 1,066,417 ▲16.99%
- 2017–2018: 1,264,801 ▲18.6%
- 2018–2019: 990,096 ▼21.71%
- 2019–2020: 709,000 ▼28.39%
- 2020–2021: 347,000 ▼51.05%
- 2021–2022: 454,200 ▲30.89%
- 2022–2023: 716,900 ▲57.84%
- 2023–2024: 779,150 ▲8.68%
- 2024–2025: 719,300 ▼7.68%

Services
Preceding station	Metro Trains	Following station
Victoria Park towards Flinders Street	Mernda line	Rushall towards Mernda
Victoria Park towards Flinders Street	Hurstbridge line	Westgarth towards Hurstbridge
Victoria Park towards Flinders Street	Hurstbridge line Weekday peak express services	Ivanhoe towards Hurstbridge
Track layout
Location

Clifton Hill station is a railway station operated by Metro Trains Melbourne on the Mernda and Hurstbridge lines, both part of the Melbourne rail network. It serves the north-eastern suburb of Clifton Hill, in Melbourne, Victoria, Australia. Clifton Hill station is a ground-level premium station, featuring two side platforms. It opened on 8 May 1888, with the current station provided in 1990.

Immediately to the north of the station, the Mernda and Hurstbridge lines diverge.

== History ==
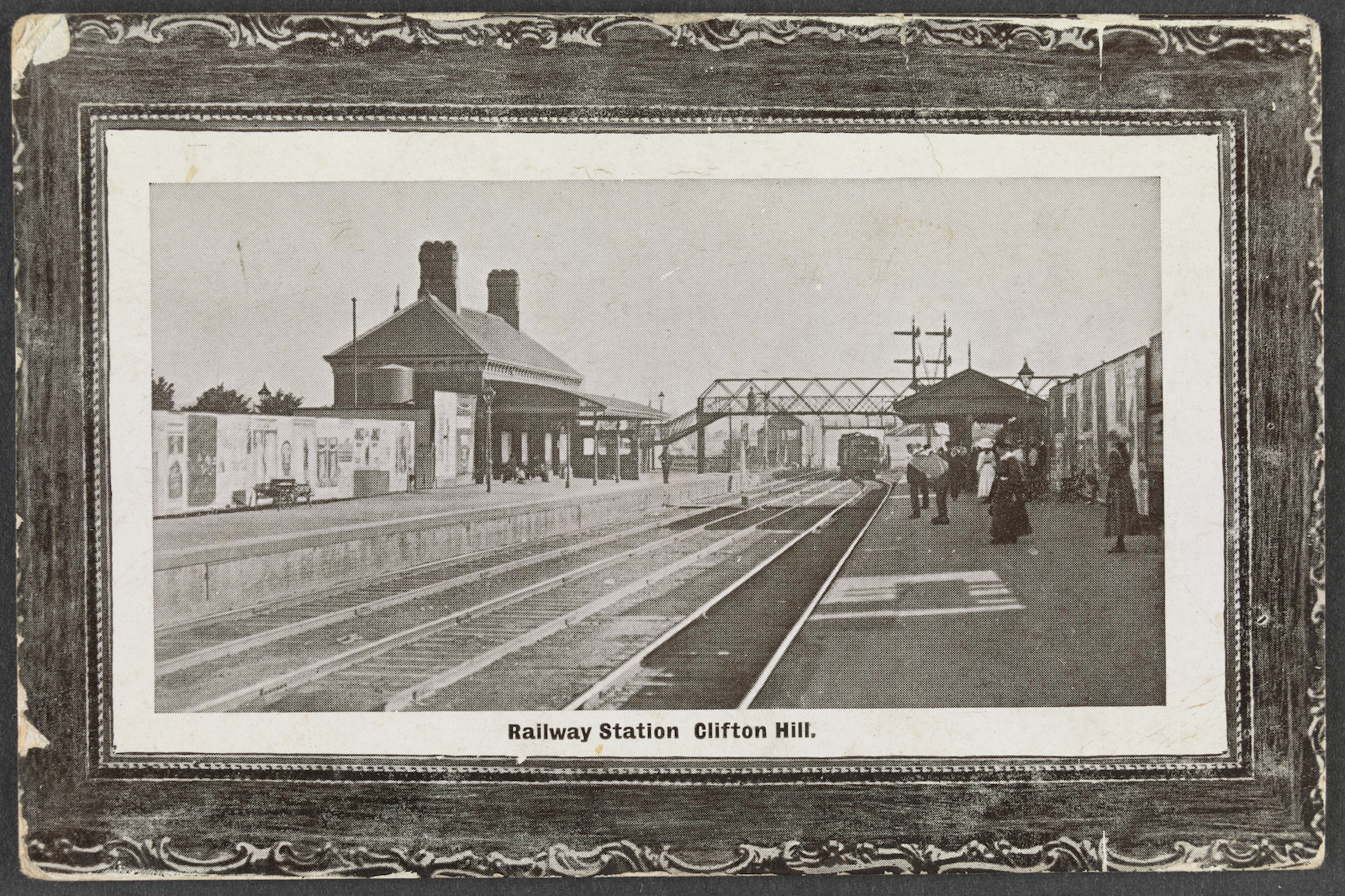
Postcard of the railway station c. 1900

Clifton Hill station opened on 8 May 1888, when a railway line between Collingwood and Heidelberg was provided. Like the suburb itself, the station was named after the farm Clifton, which was named in 1841 by early landowner John Docker. Land speculator John Knipe later named the area Clifton Hill.

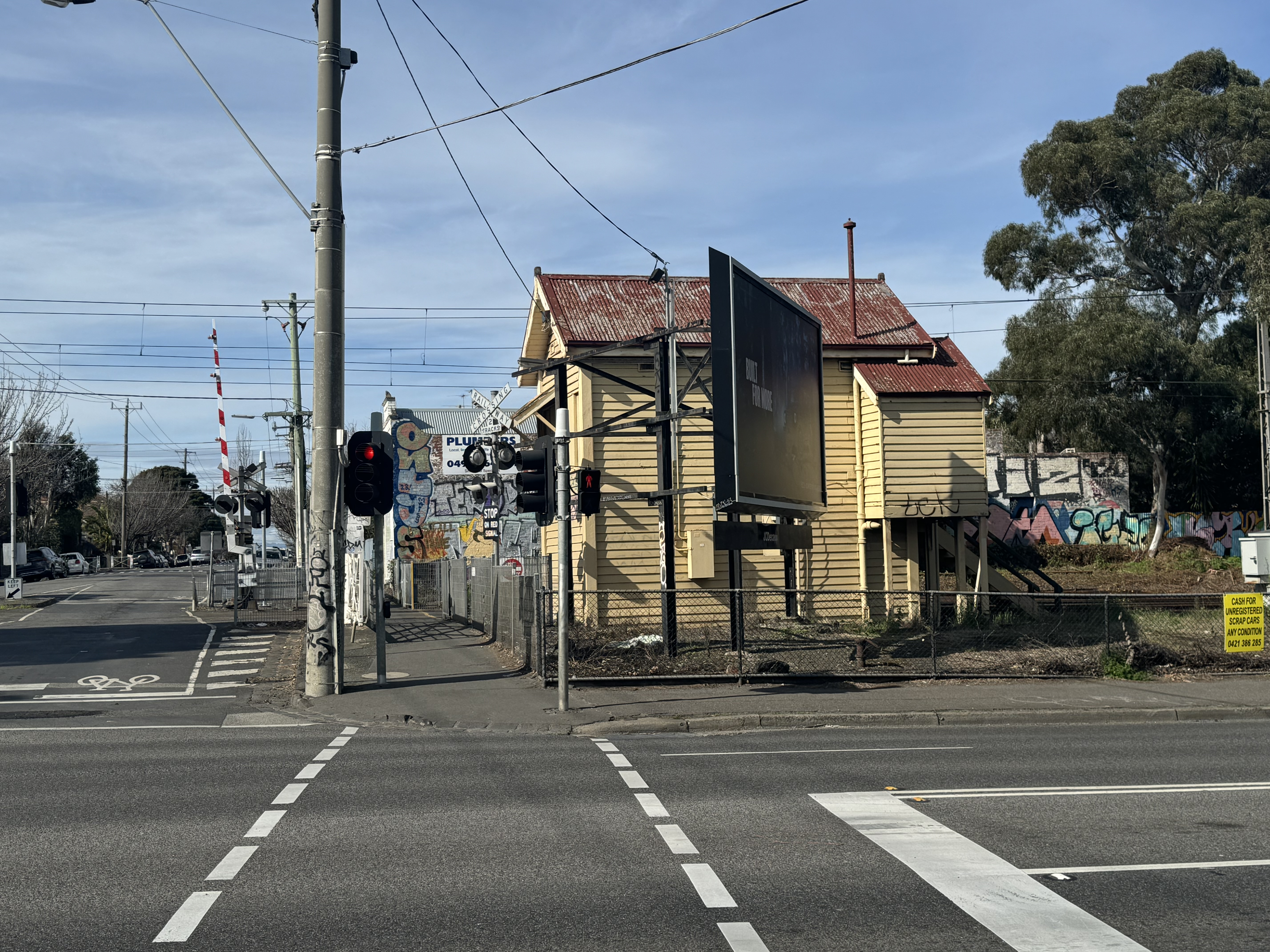
The disused signal box, previously used for the hand gates at Ramsden Street level crossing

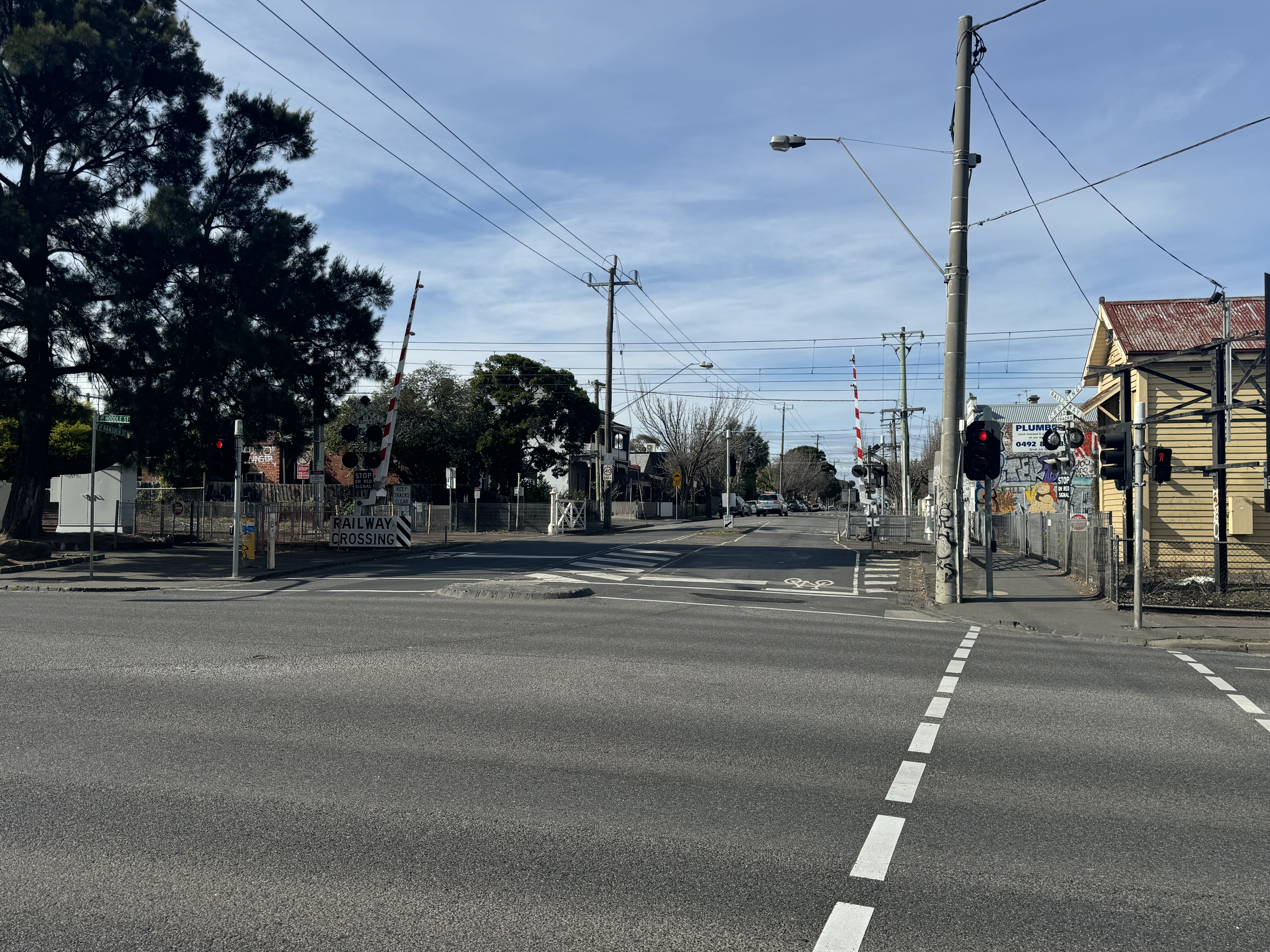
The level crossing's current boom gates, which were used since 1992, succeeding the hand gates, which were put back for show

In December 1981, the station building was damaged by fire, although the heritage-registered verandah escaped serious damage. In 1990, the station was renovated, with a matching verandah built on the western platform (Platform 2). In 1992, boom barriers replaced interlocked gates at the Ramsden Street level crossing, located nearby in the up direction of the station. Signal boxes "A" and "B" were also abolished in May of that year, with semaphore signals replaced by coloured light signals. On 25 June 1996, Clifton Hill was upgraded to a premium station.

Clifton Hill is listed on the Register of the National Estate as an intact example of a Victorian Tudor-style suburban railway station, and is one of eleven that were originally built between 1887 and 1889. It is the only example that still retains the original corrugated iron wings on either side of the main building. The timber verandah on the eastern platform (Platform 1) is also considered architecturally rare. Other features of the complex include two timber-framed gabled roofed signal boxes (built in 1888 and 1901 respectively), located on either side of Platform 2, and the original swinging railway gates (out of use since 1992). One signal box was for the operation of the former level crossing gates across Heidelberg Road, which was replaced by a road overpass in 1957. The other signal box controlled the level crossing gates at Ramsden Street.

Clifton Hill was once part of the Inner Circle line. The Hurstbridge line, between Clifton Hill and Westgarth, was duplicated during late 2008 and early 2009, and included a second bridge over the Merri Creek. On 27 January 2009, it was opened by former premier, John Brumby, and former transport minister, Lynne Kosky.

In the early hours of 25 December 2011, a corrugated iron extension to the Platform 2 station building was damaged by fire. By 12 January 2012, the extension was demolished and removed.

On 13 July 2025, an X'Trapolis train derailed near the station.

On 10 May 2026, the Victorian Government announced that Clifton Hill station, alongside four other stations in Victoria would be getting safety and accessibility upgrades as part of the 2026/27 $7.6 million State Budget. This includes installation of tactile boarding indicators on the platform surface and other safety and accessibility upgrades.

== Platforms and services ==
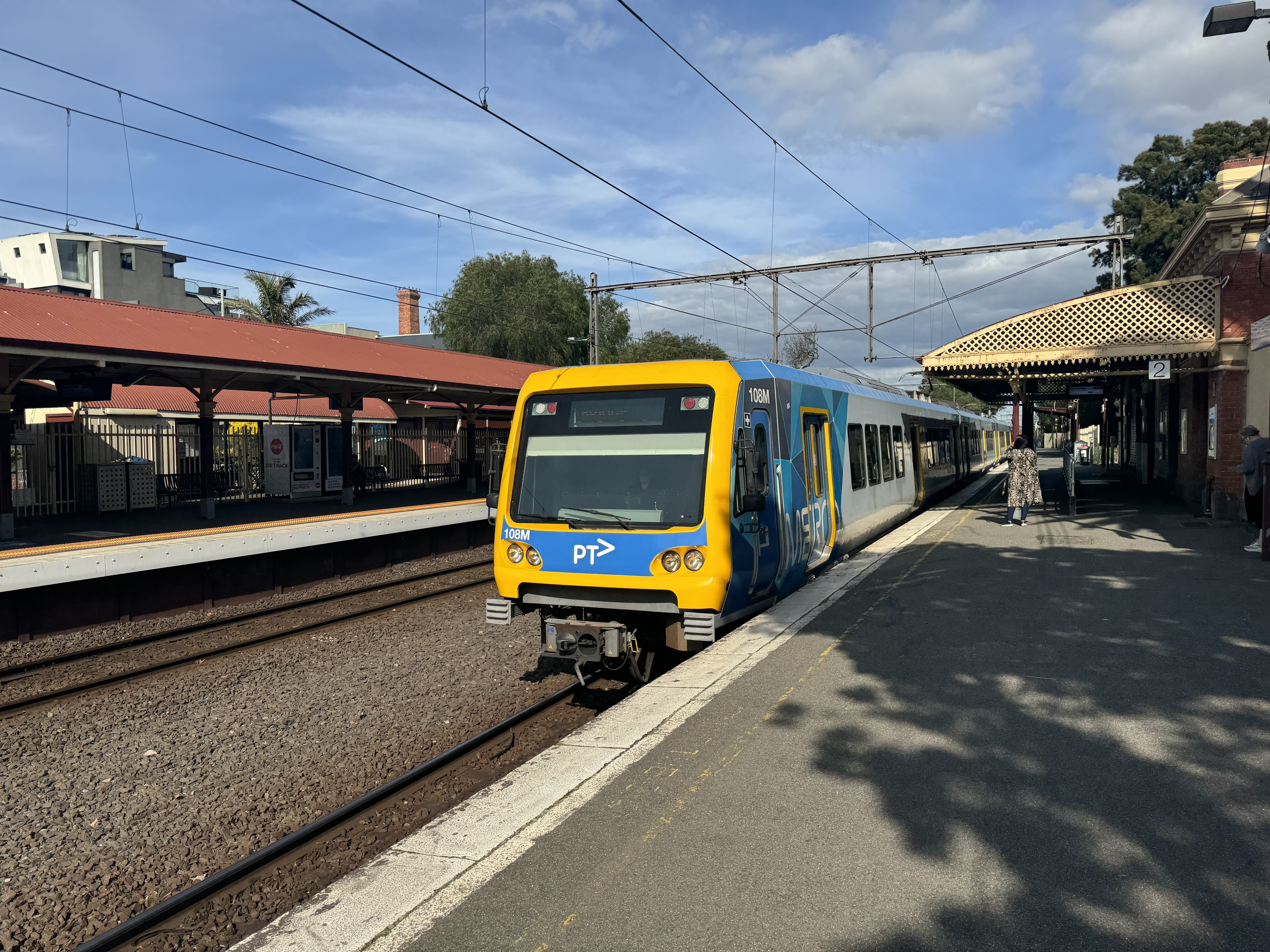
An X'Trapolis train on a Hurstbridge-bound service arrives at Platform 2, August 2024

Clifton Hill has two side platforms, connected by an underpass. Platform 1 contains an enclosed waiting area, while Platform 2 contains a semi-enclosed waiting area and toilets.

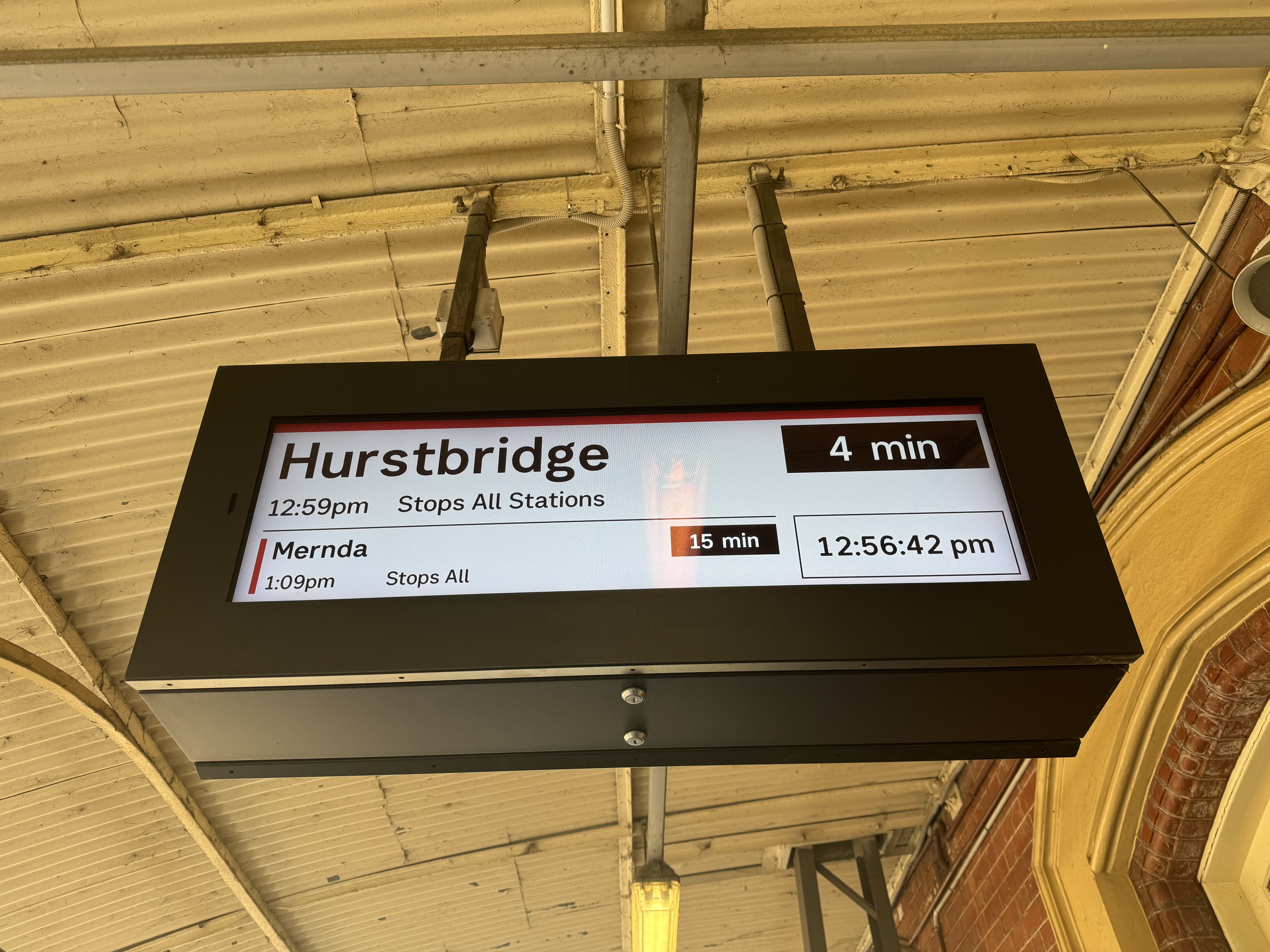
A PID on Platform 2 displaying a Hurstbridge-bound service, August 2024

The station is serviced by Metro Trains' Mernda and Hurstbridge line services.

Clifton Hill platform arrangement
Platform	Line	Destination	Service Type	Source
1	Mernda line Hurstbridge line	Flinders Street	All stations and limited express services	
2	Mernda line	Reservoir, Epping or Mernda	All stations and limited express services	
2	Hurstbridge line	Macleod, Greensborough, Eltham or Hurstbridge	All stations and limited express services	

== Transport links ==
Kinetic operates three bus routes via Clifton Hill station, under contract to Public Transport Victoria:

- 504 : to Moonee Ponds Junction
- 546 : Heidelberg Station – Melbourne University (Note: Route 546 services continue beyond Melbourne University to/from Moonee Ponds Junction as route 505.)
- 246 : Elsternwick station – Clifton Hill

== Gallery ==
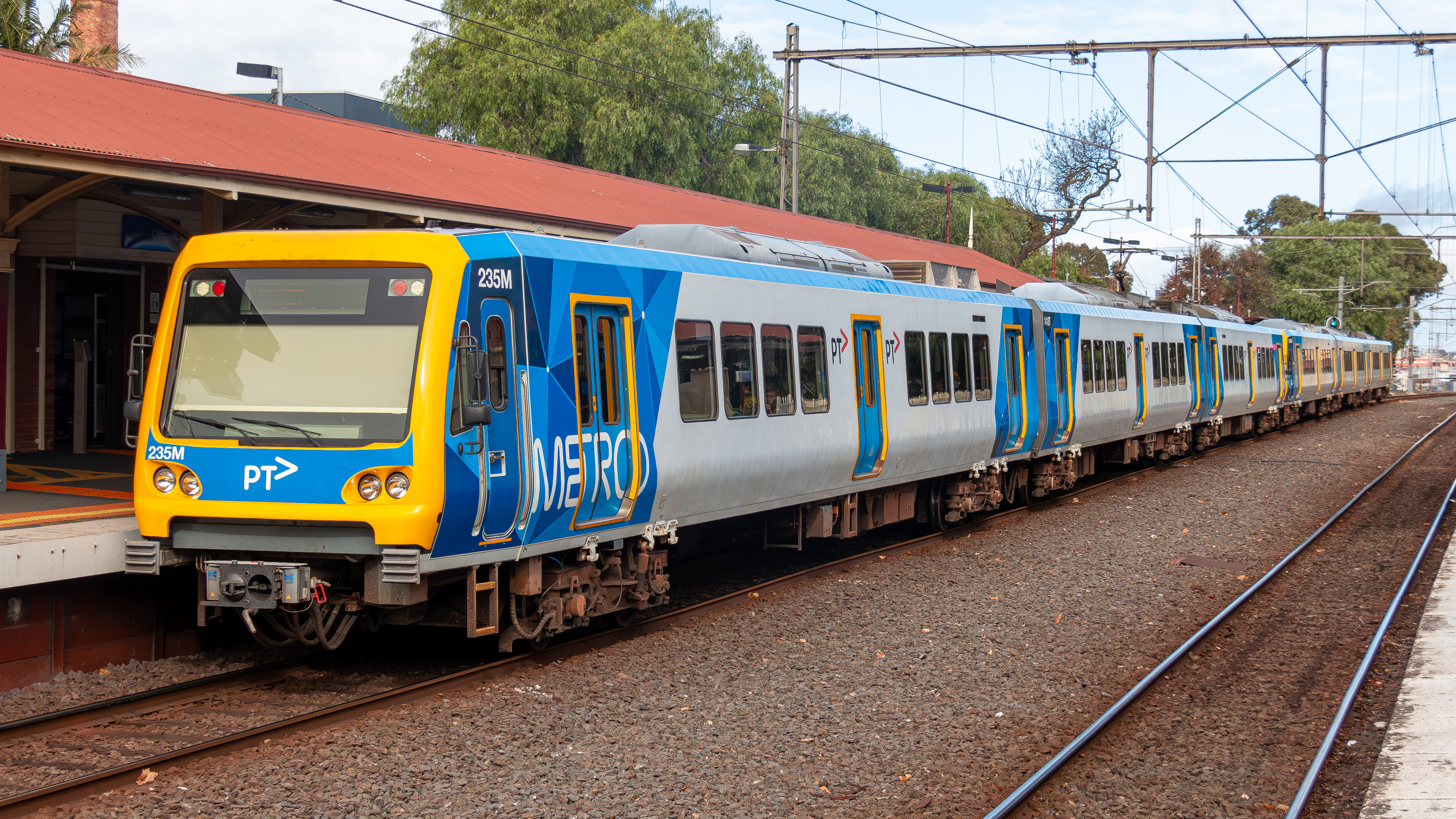
An X'Trapolis set departs Platform 1 on a
City-bound service, June 2024

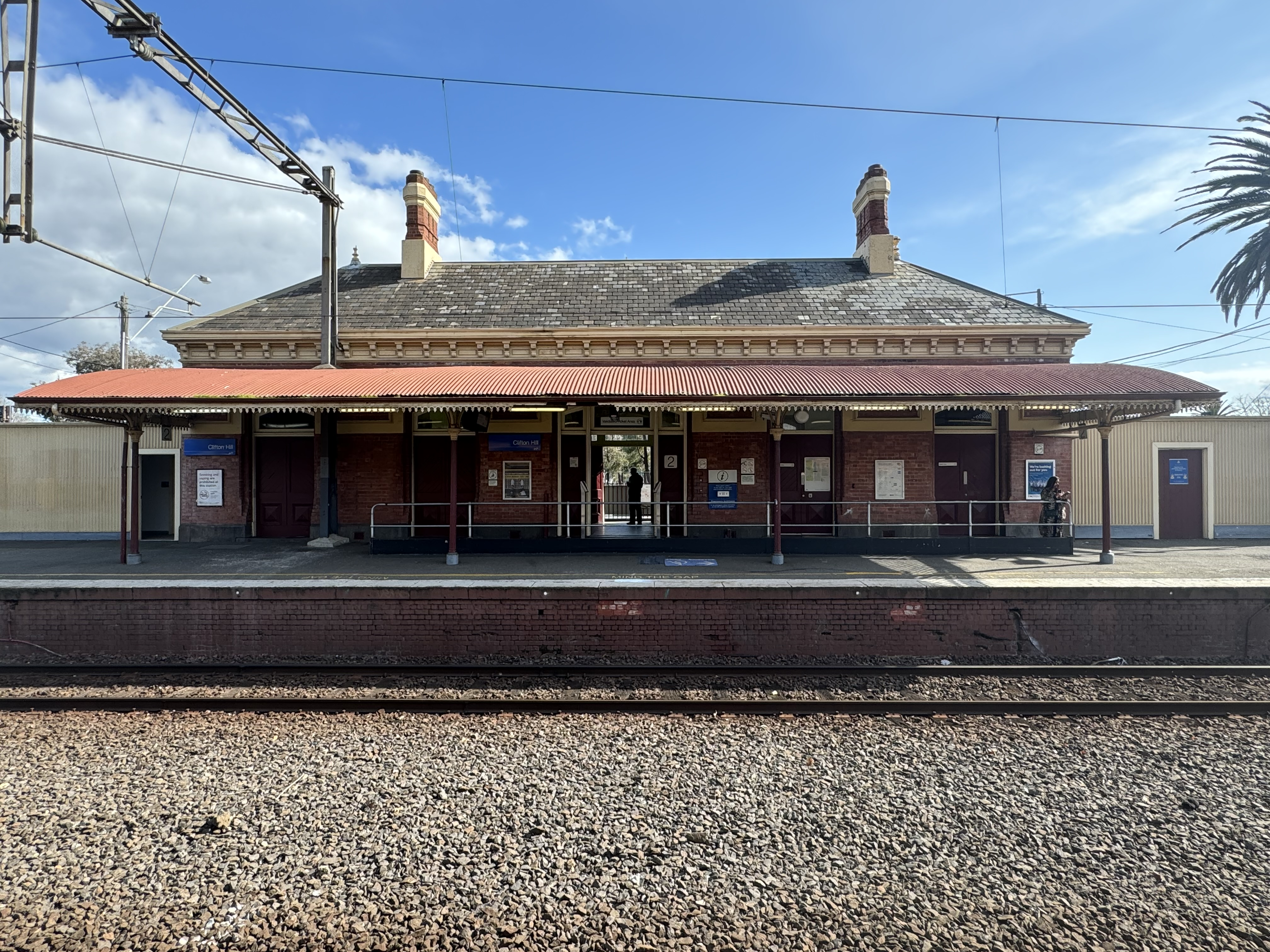
Station building on Platform 2, August 2024

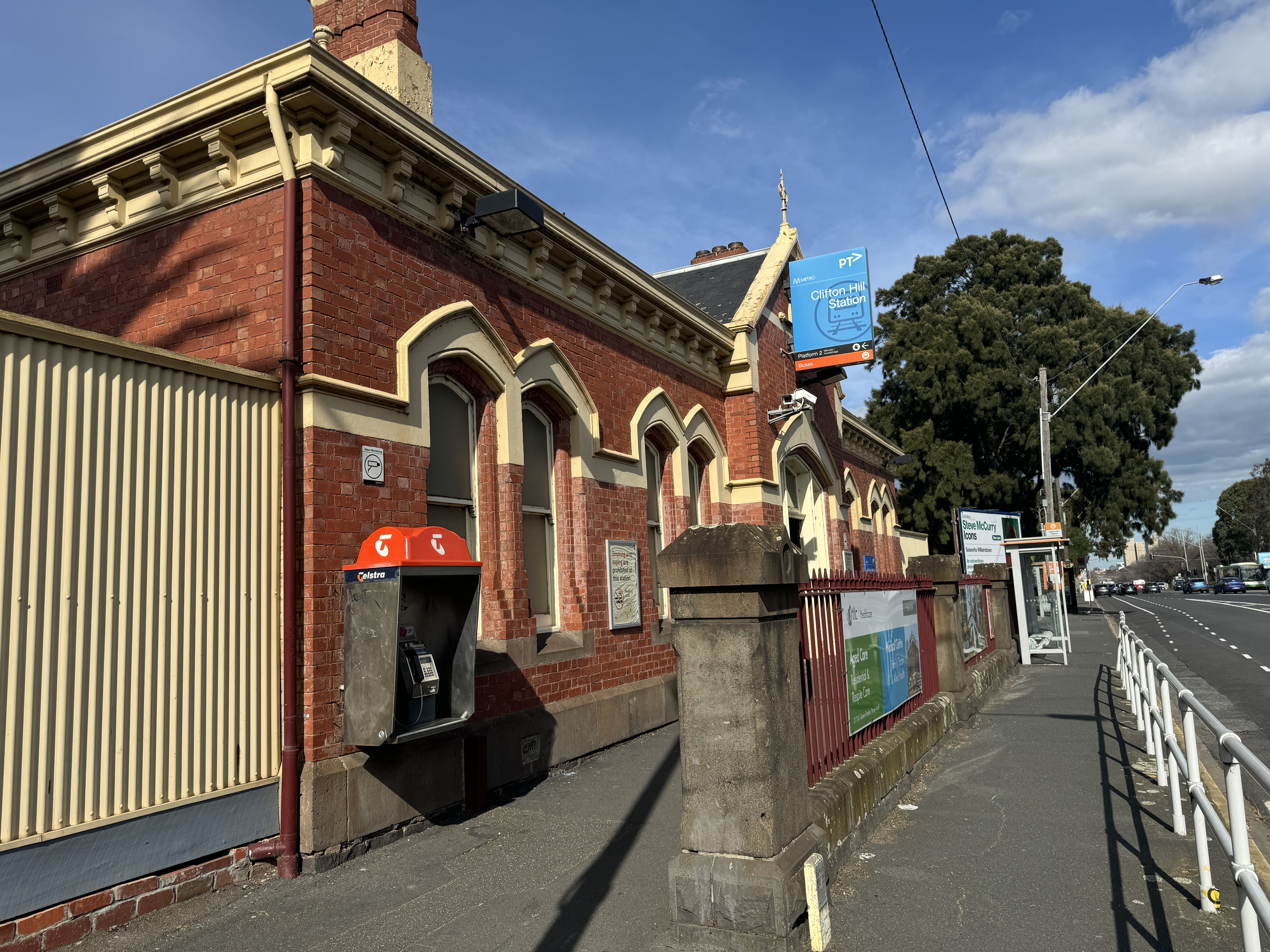
Station building and entrance to Platform 2, facing from Hoddle Highway, August 2024

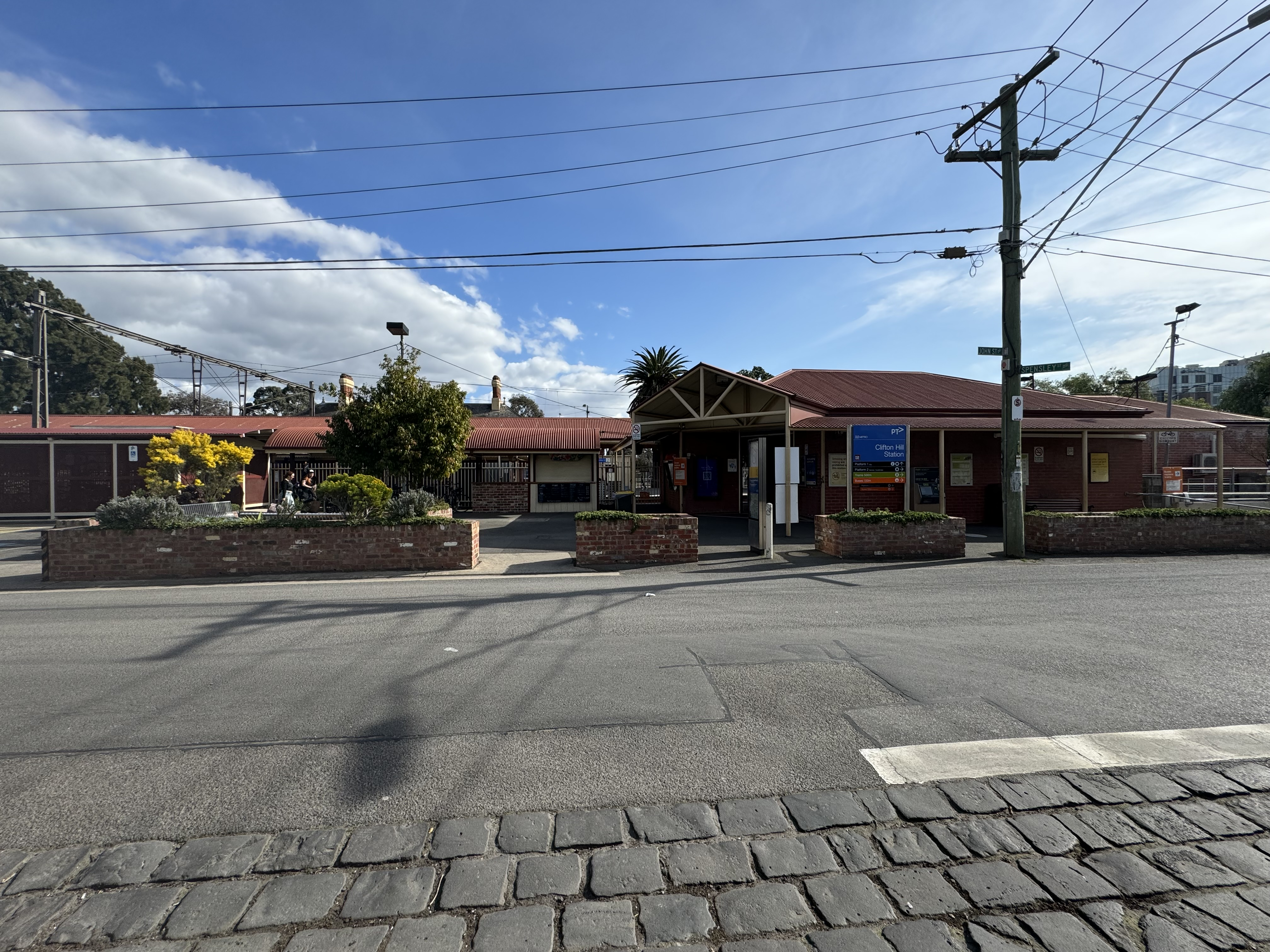
Station building and entrance to Platform 1, August 2024

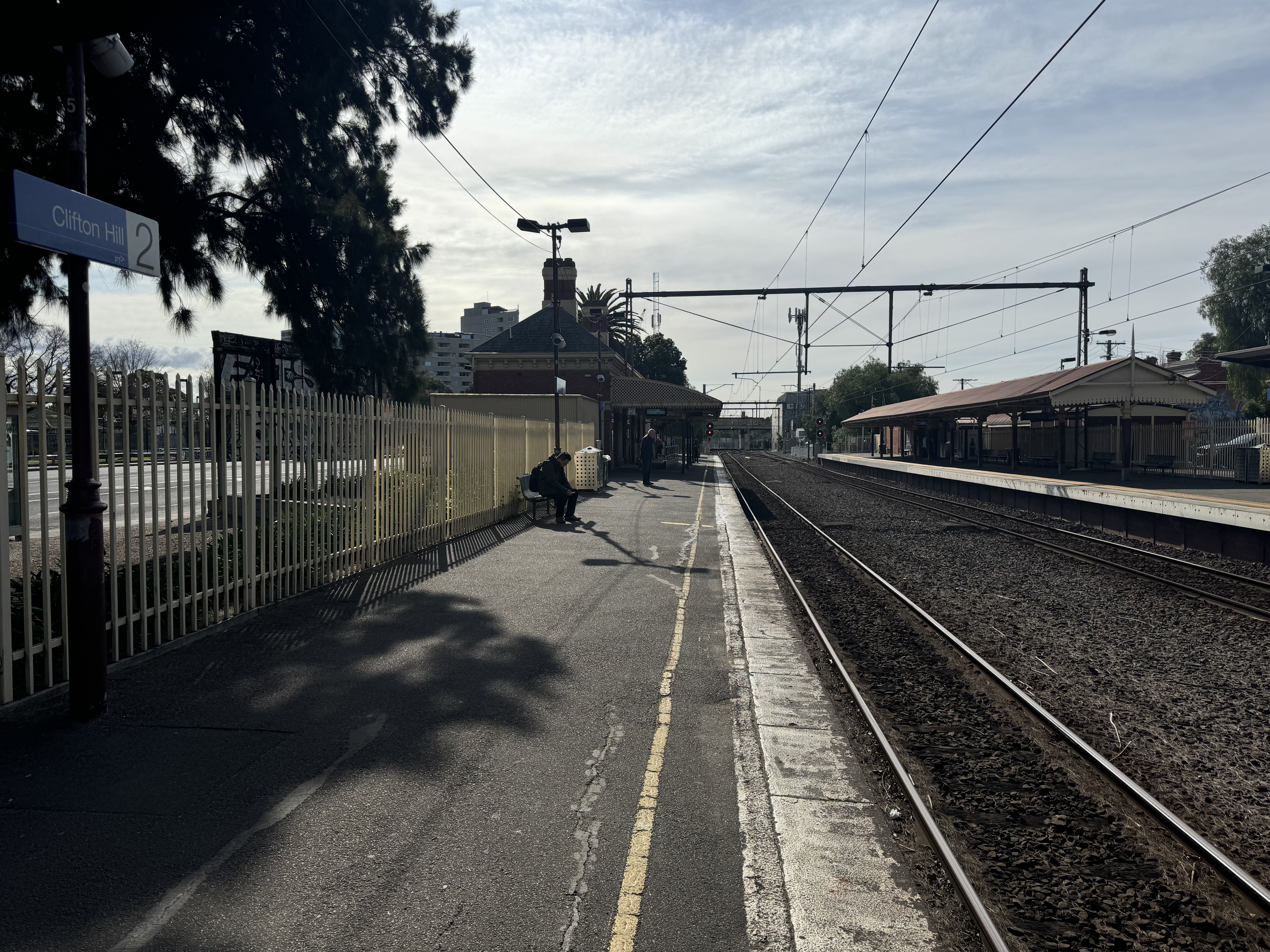
Northbound view from Platform 2, August 2024

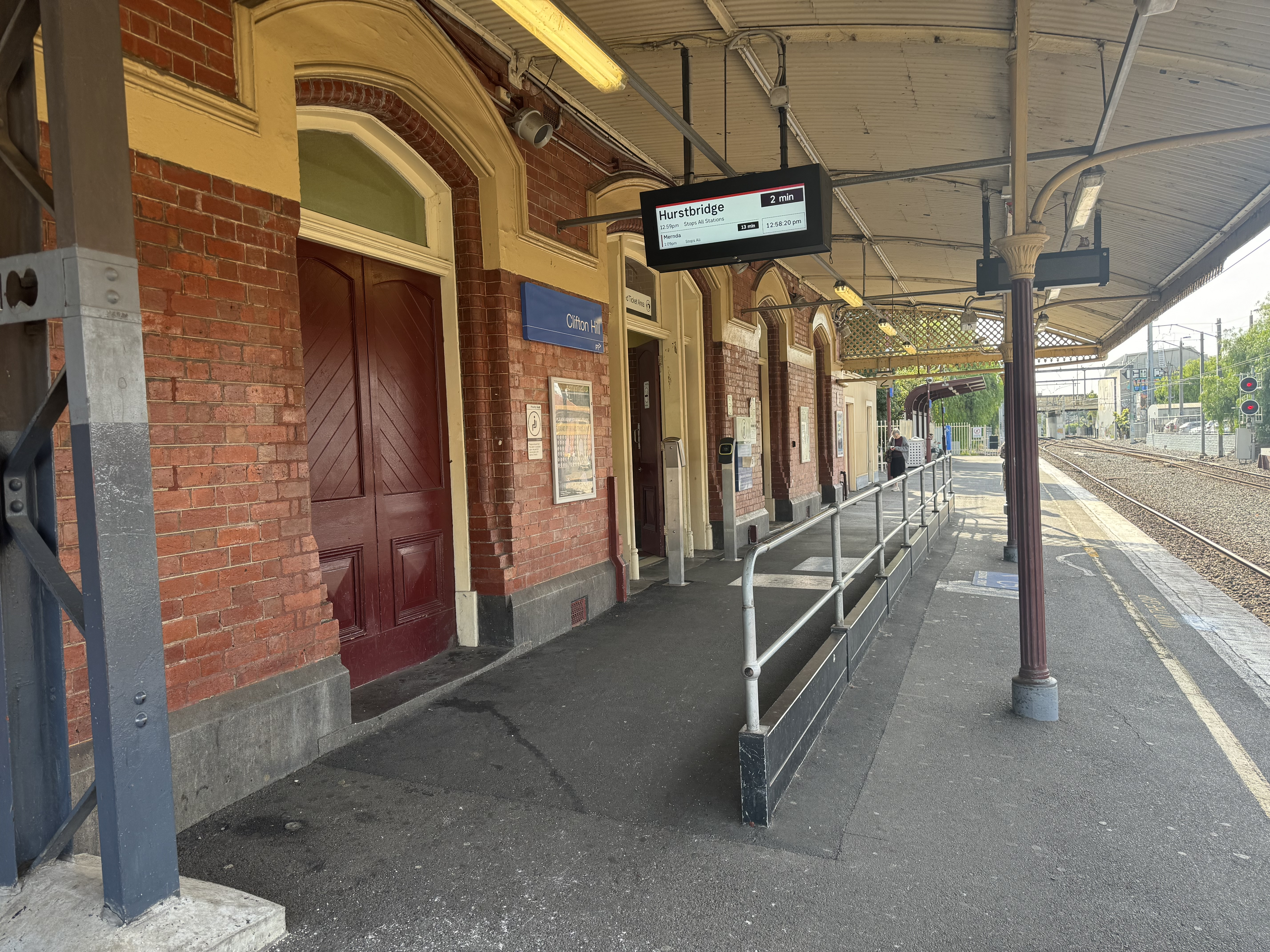
The ramps, station building, verandah and PIDS on Platform 2, August 2024

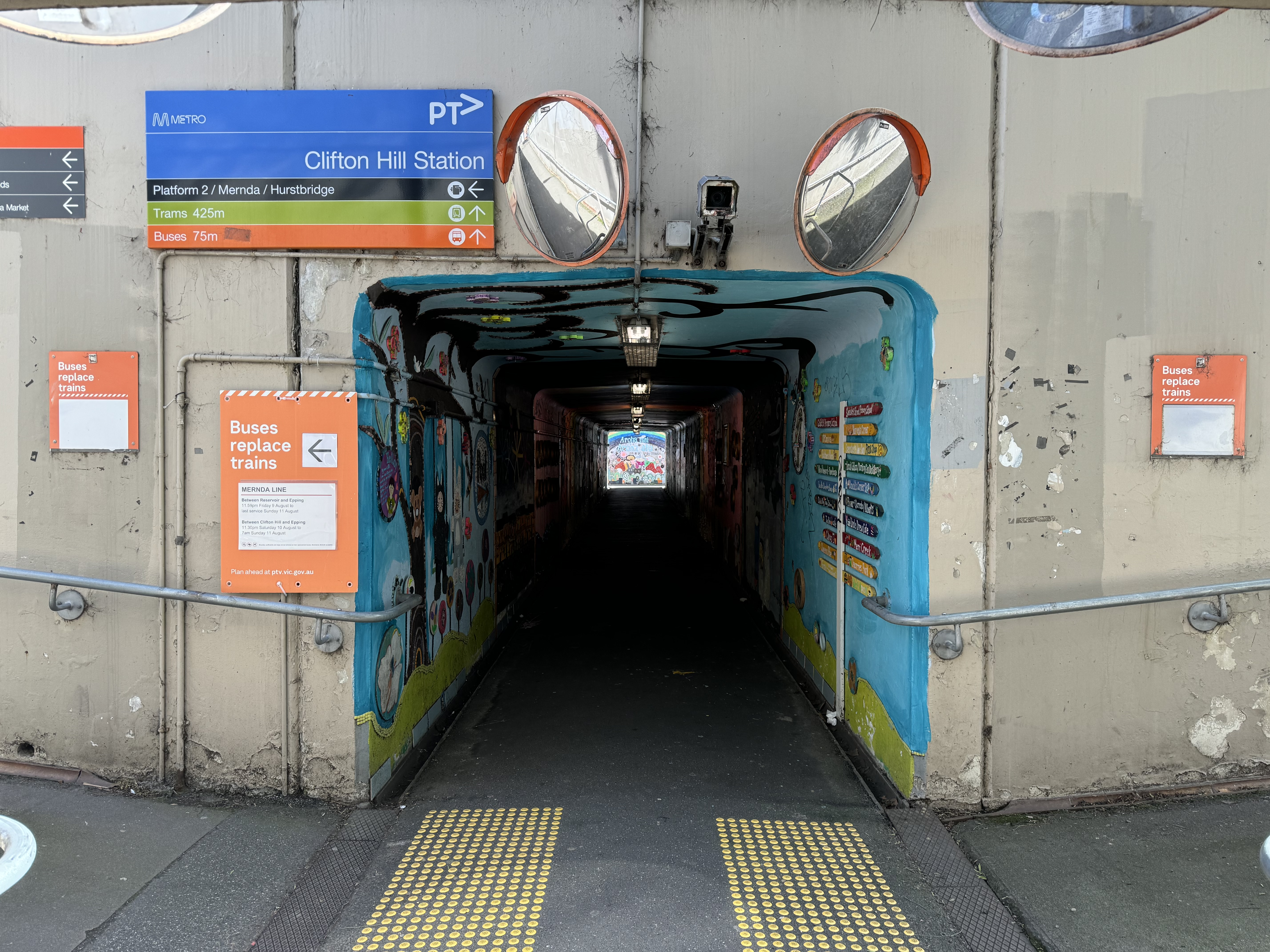
The station's pedestrian underpass under Hoddle Highway, August 2024

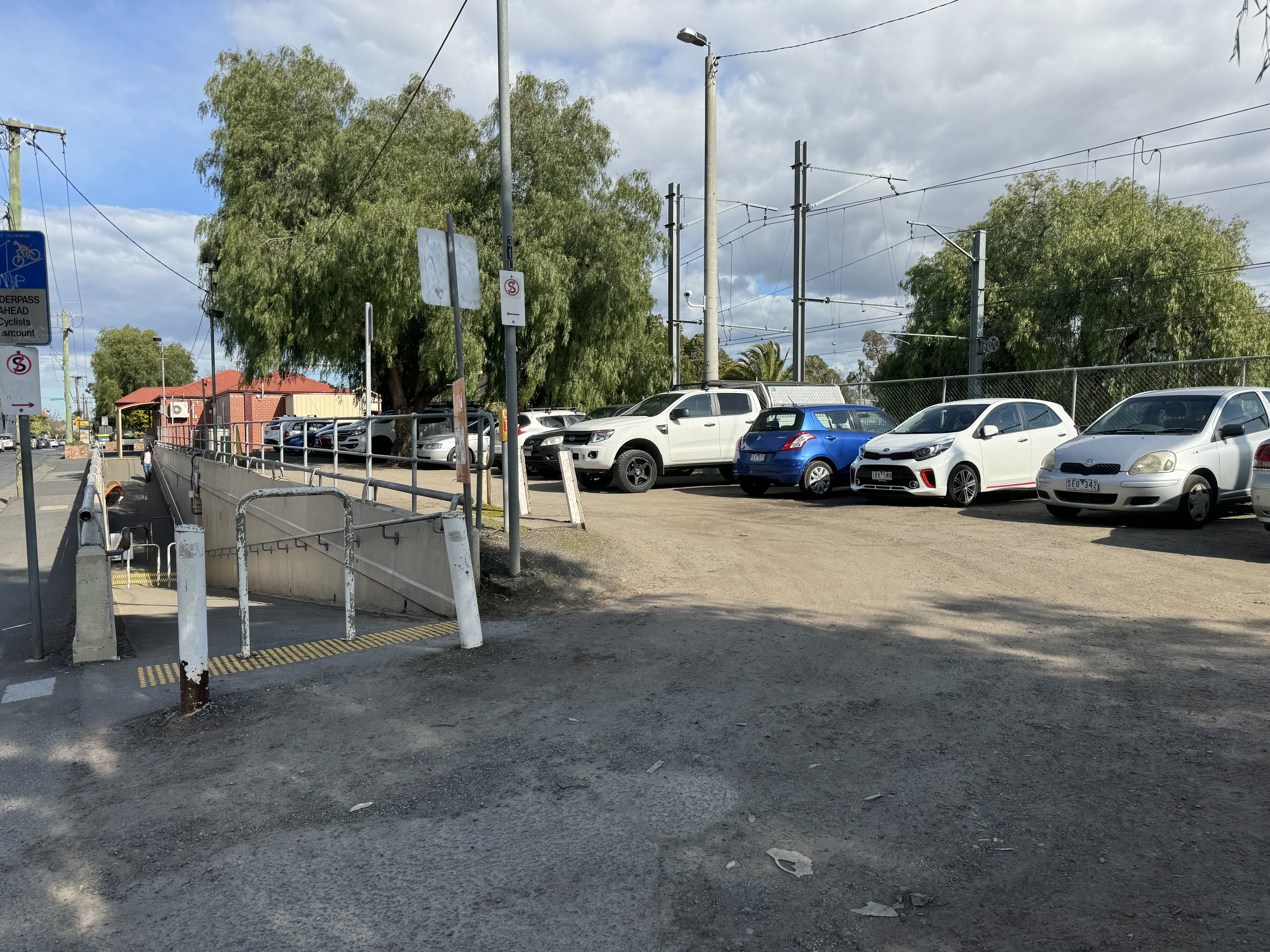
The station's eastern car park and pedestrian underpass entrance, August 2024

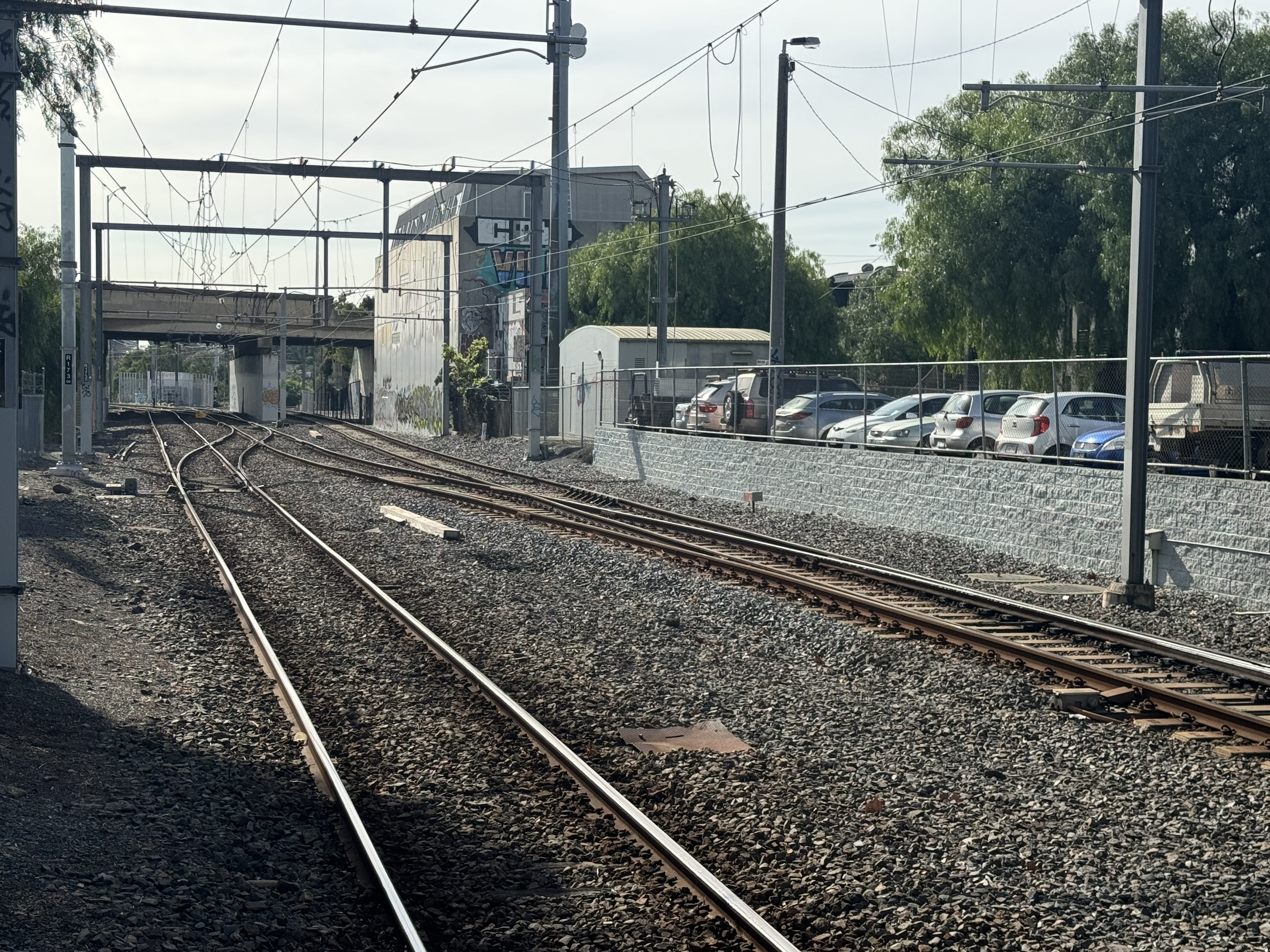
The railway tracks where the Mernda and Hurstbridge lines diverge north of the station
