= Eaglemont railway station =

Railway station in Melbourne, Australia

Eaglemont
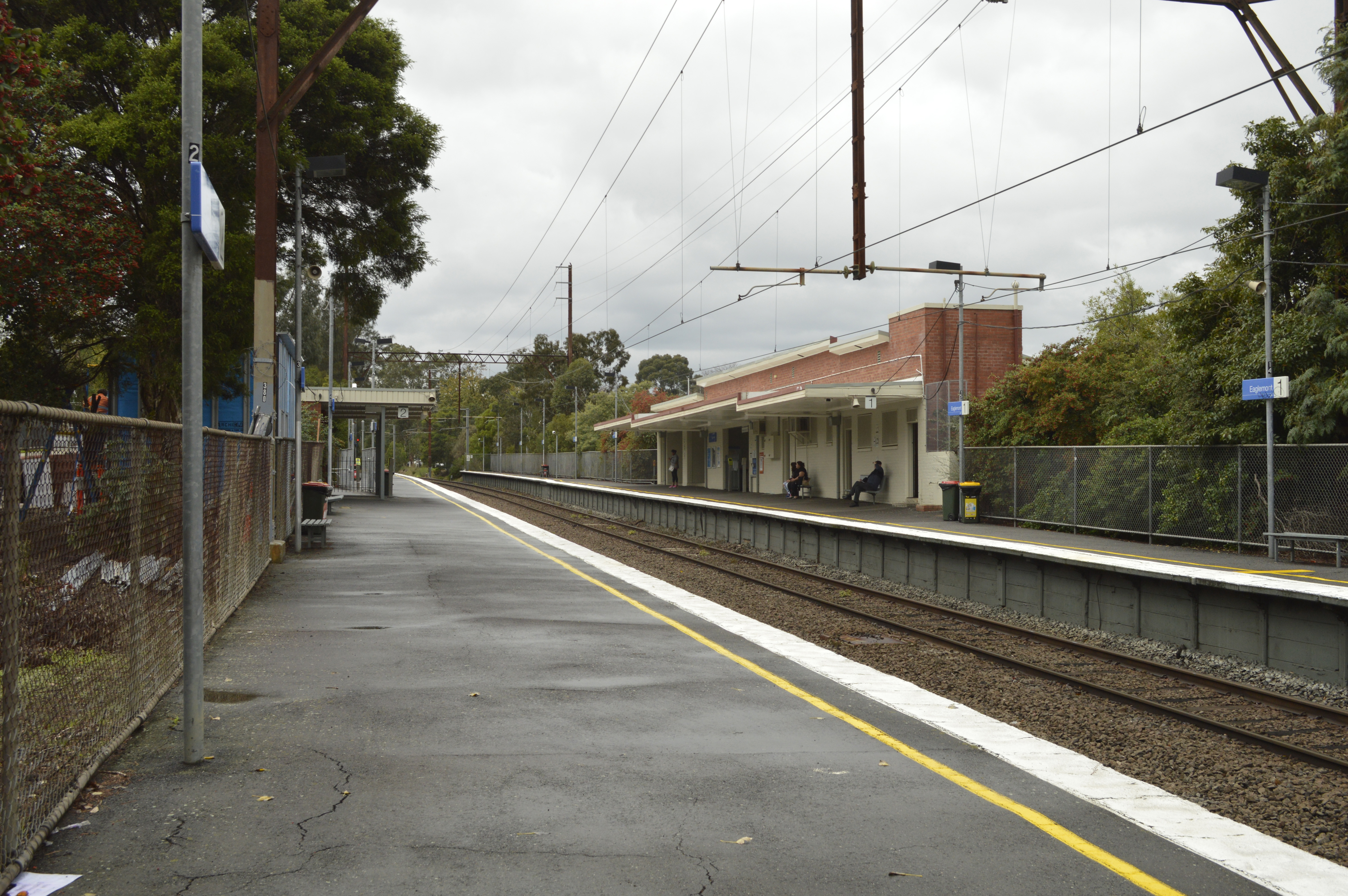
- Northbound view from Platform 2, May 2014

General information
- Location: Silverdale Road, Eaglemont, Victoria 3084; City of Banyule; Australia
- Coordinates: 37°45′50″S 145°03′14″E
- System: PTV commuter rail station
- Owner: VicTrack
- Operator: Metro Trains
- Line: Hurstbridge
- Distance: 13.09 kilometres from Southern Cross
- Platforms: 2 side
- Tracks: 2

Construction
- Structure type: Ground
- Parking: 42
- Cycle facilities: 5
- Accessible: No—steep ramp

Other information
- Status: Operational, unstaffed
- Station code: EGT
- Fare zone: Myki zone 1/2
- Website: Public Transport Victoria

History
- Opened: 1 May 1926; 100 years ago
- Electrified: July 1921 (1500 V DC overhead)

Passengers
- 2005–2006: 178,664
- 2006–2007: 197,898 ▲10.76%
- 2007–2008: 217,369 ▲9.83%
- 2008–2009: 216,022 ▼0.61%
- 2009–2010: 218,126 ▲0.97%
- 2010–2011: 217,663 ▼0.21%
- 2011–2012: 198,368 ▼8.86%
- 2012–2013: Not measured
- 2013–2014: 181,986 ▼8.25%
- 2014–2015: 175,354 ▼3.64%
- 2015–2016: 180,675 ▲3.03%
- 2016–2017: 174,219 ▼3.57%
- 2017–2018: 144,409 ▼17.11%
- 2018–2019: 164,497 ▲13.91%
- 2019–2020: 128,000 ▼22.18%
- 2020–2021: 50,550 ▼60.5%
- 2021–2022: 58,550 ▲15.82%
- 2022–2023: 99,350 ▲69.68%
- 2023–2024: 111,200 ▲11.93%
- 2024–2025: 126,500 ▲13.76%

Services
| Preceding station | Metro Trains | Following station |
|---|---|---|
| Ivanhoe towards Flinders Street | Hurstbridge line | Heidelberg towards Hurstbridge |
Track layout
Location

Eaglemont station is a railway station operated by Metro Trains Melbourne on the Hurstbridge line, part of the Melbourne rail network. It serves the north-eastern suburb of Eaglemont, in Melbourne, Victoria, Australia. Eaglemont station is a ground level unstaffed station, featuring two side platforms. It opened on 1 May 1926.

== History ==
Eaglemont station, like the suburb itself, was named after Mount Eagle, a property that was acquired in 1838 by Thomas Walker, who became a representative of the District of Port Phillip in the New South Wales Legislative Council between 1843 and 1845. Walker later sold the property to John Browne, father of author Rolf Boldrewood.

In 1949, the railway line between Ivanhoe and Heidelberg was duplicated. In 1979, the present station building on Platform 2 was provided.

On 10 May 2026, the Victorian Government announced that Eaglemont station, alongside four other stations in Victoria would be getting safety and accessibility upgrades as part of the 2026/27 $7.6 million State Budget. This includes installation of tactile boarding indicators on the platform surface and other safety and accessibility upgrades.

== Platforms and services ==
Eaglemont has two side platforms. It is served by Hurstbridge line trains.

Eaglemont platform arrangement
| Platform | Line | Destination | Service Type | Source |
|---|---|---|---|---|
| 1 | Hurstbridge line | Flinders Street | All stations and limited express services | |
| 2 | Hurstbridge line | Macleod, Greensborough, Eltham or Hurstbridge | All stations and limited express services | |
