= Victoria Park railway station, Melbourne =

Railway station in Melbourne, Australia

Victoria Park
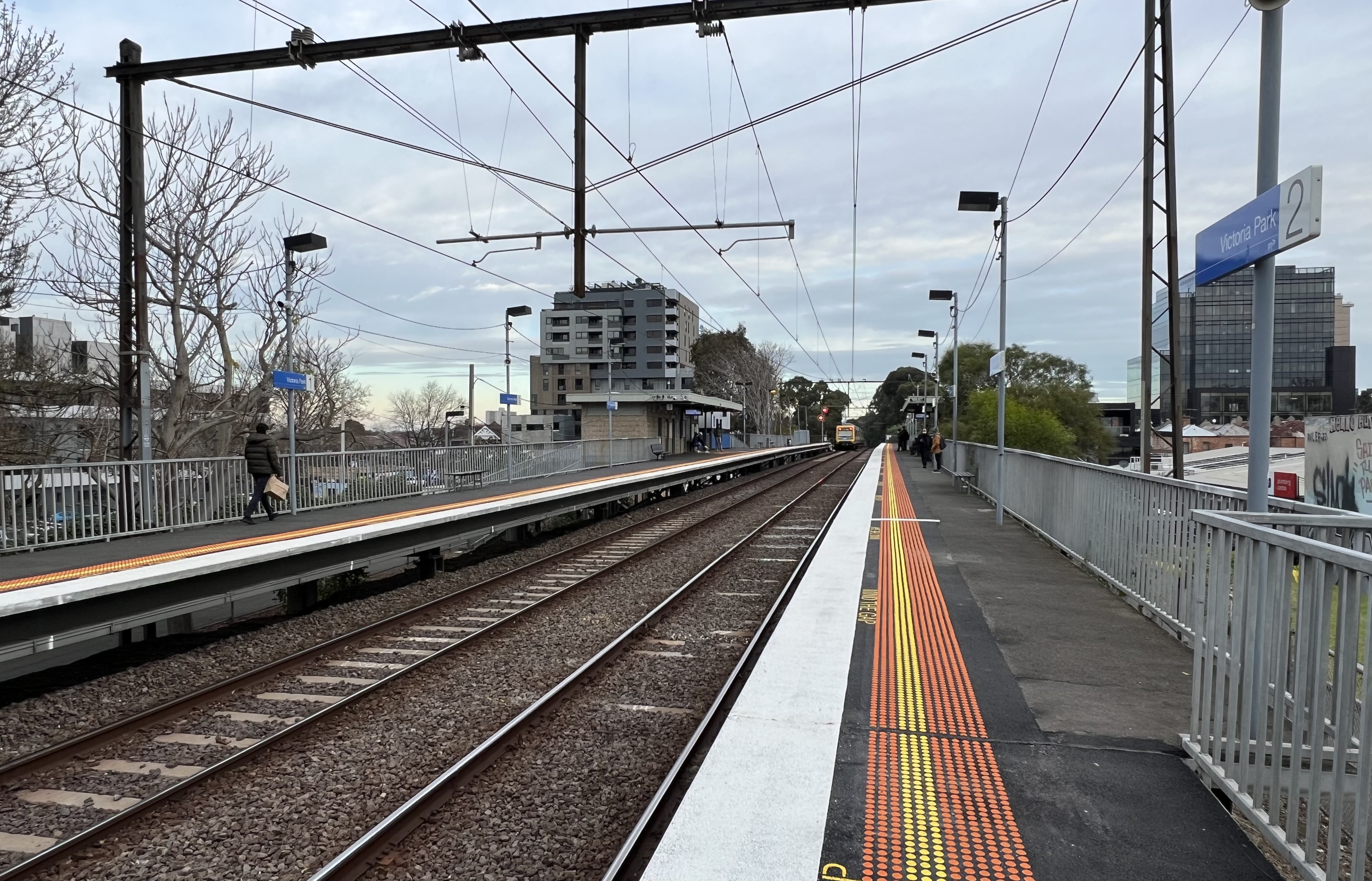
- Southbound view from Platform 2, June 2024

General information
- Location: Little Turner Street, Abbotsford, Victoria 3067; City of Yarra; Australia
- Coordinates: 37°47′57″S 144°59′40″E
- System: PTV commuter rail station
- Owner: VicTrack
- Operator: Metro Trains
- Lines: Mernda; Hurstbridge
- Distance: 5.42 kilometres from Southern Cross
- Platforms: 2 side
- Tracks: 2
- Connections: Bus

Construction
- Structure type: Elevated
- Accessible: No—steep ramp

Other information
- Status: Operational, unstaffed
- Station code: VPK
- Fare zone: Myki zone 1
- Website: Public Transport Victoria

History
- Opened: 8 May 1888; 138 years ago
- Rebuilt: 1959; 1981
- Electrified: July 1921 (1500 V DC overhead)
- Former names: Collingwood (1888-1909)

Passengers
- 2005–2006: 342,230
- 2006–2007: 378,760 ▲10.67%
- 2007–2008: 435,326 ▲14.93%
- 2008–2009: 473,573 ▲8.78%
- 2009–2010: 490,286 ▲3.53%
- 2010–2011: 536,820 ▲9.5%
- 2011–2012: 490,913 ▼8.55%
- 2012–2013: Not measured
- 2013–2014: 586,748 ▲19.52%
- 2014–2015: 634,455 ▲8.13%
- 2015–2016: 757,658 ▲19.41%
- 2016–2017: 732,773 ▼3.28%
- 2017–2018: 800,101 ▲9.19%
- 2018–2019: 757,700 ▼5.3%
- 2019–2020: 612,450 ▼19.17%
- 2020–2021: 277,400 ▼54.7%
- 2021–2022: 317,800 ▲14.56%

Services
Preceding station	Metro Trains	Following station
Collingwood towards Flinders Street	Mernda line	Clifton Hill towards Mernda, Eltham or Hurstbridge
Collingwood towards Flinders Street	Hurstbridge line	Clifton Hill towards Mernda, Eltham or Hurstbridge
Track layout
Location

Victoria Park station is a railway station operated by Metro Trains Melbourne on the Mernda and Hurstbridge lines, both part of the Melbourne rail network. It serves the north-eastern Melbourne suburb of Abbotsford in Victoria, Australia. Victoria Park is an elevated unstaffed station, featuring two side platforms. It opened on 8 May 1888, with the current platforms provided in 1959 and station provided in 1981.

Initially opened as Collingwood, the station was given its current name of Victoria Park on 1 May 1909. A former goods yard is located adjacent to Platform 1, whilst a stabling siding, capable of holding two stabled trains, is located at the down (northern) end of the station.

== History ==
Victoria Park station opened on 8 May 1888 and, until 1901, the station was the terminus of the Collingwood to Heidelberg railway line. Until a direct connection with the Melbourne CBD was opened in 1901 between Princes Bridge and Collingwood Town Hall, the only connection to the city centre was via the indirect Inner Circle line.

On 21 March 1959, the station platforms were damaged by a fire that occurred at a nearby timber yard.

In 1981, the present pebbledash station buildings were provided, with the original timber pylons that supported the former buildings removed soon after.

The station is adjacent to Victoria Park, the former home of the Collingwood Football Club between 1892 and 1999. Large numbers of people used Victoria Park station to travel to and from AFL matches played at the stadium.

Announced as part of a $21.9 million package in the 2022/23 Victorian State Budget, Victoria Park, alongside other stations, will receive accessibility upgrades, the installation of CCTV and platform shelters. The development process will begin in late 2022 or 2023, with a timeline for the upgrades to be released once construction has begun.

== Platforms and services ==
Victoria Park has two side platforms. It is serviced by Metro Trains' Mernda and Hurstbridge line services.

Victoria Park platform arrangement
Platform	Line	Destination	Service Type	Source
1	Mernda line Hurstbridge line	Flinders Street	All stations	
2	Mernda line Hurstbridge line	Reservoir, Epping, Mernda, Macleod, Greensborough, Eltham or Hurstbridge	All stations and limited express services	

== Transport links ==
Kinetic Melbourne operates fifteen routes via Victoria Park station, under contract to Public Transport Victoria:

- 200 : Melbourne CBD (Queen Street) – Bulleen
- 207 : Melbourne CBD (Queen Street) – Westfield Doncaster
- 241 : North Melbourne station – Yarra Bend Park
- 246 : Elsternwick station – Clifton Hill
- 302 : Melbourne CBD (Lonsdale Street) – Box Hill station
- 303 : Melbourne CBD (Queen Street) – Ringwood North
- 304 : Melbourne CBD (Lonsdale Street) – Westfield Doncaster
- 305 : Melbourne CBD (Lonsdale Street) – The Pines Shopping Centre (peak-hour only)
- 309 : Melbourne CBD (Queen Street) – Donvale
- 318 : Melbourne CBD (Lonsdale Street) – Deep Creek Reserve (Doncaster East)
- 350 : Melbourne CBD (Queen Street) – La Trobe University Bundoora campus
- SmartBus 905 : Melbourne CBD (Lonsdale Street) – The Pines Shopping Centre
- SmartBus 906 : Melbourne CBD (Lonsdale Street) – Warrandyte
- SmartBus 907 : Melbourne CBD (Lonsdale Street) – Mitcham station
- SmartBus 908 : Melbourne CBD (Lonsdale Street) – The Pines Shopping Centre (peak-hour only)
