= Heidelberg railway station =

Railway station in Victoria, Australia

Heidelberg
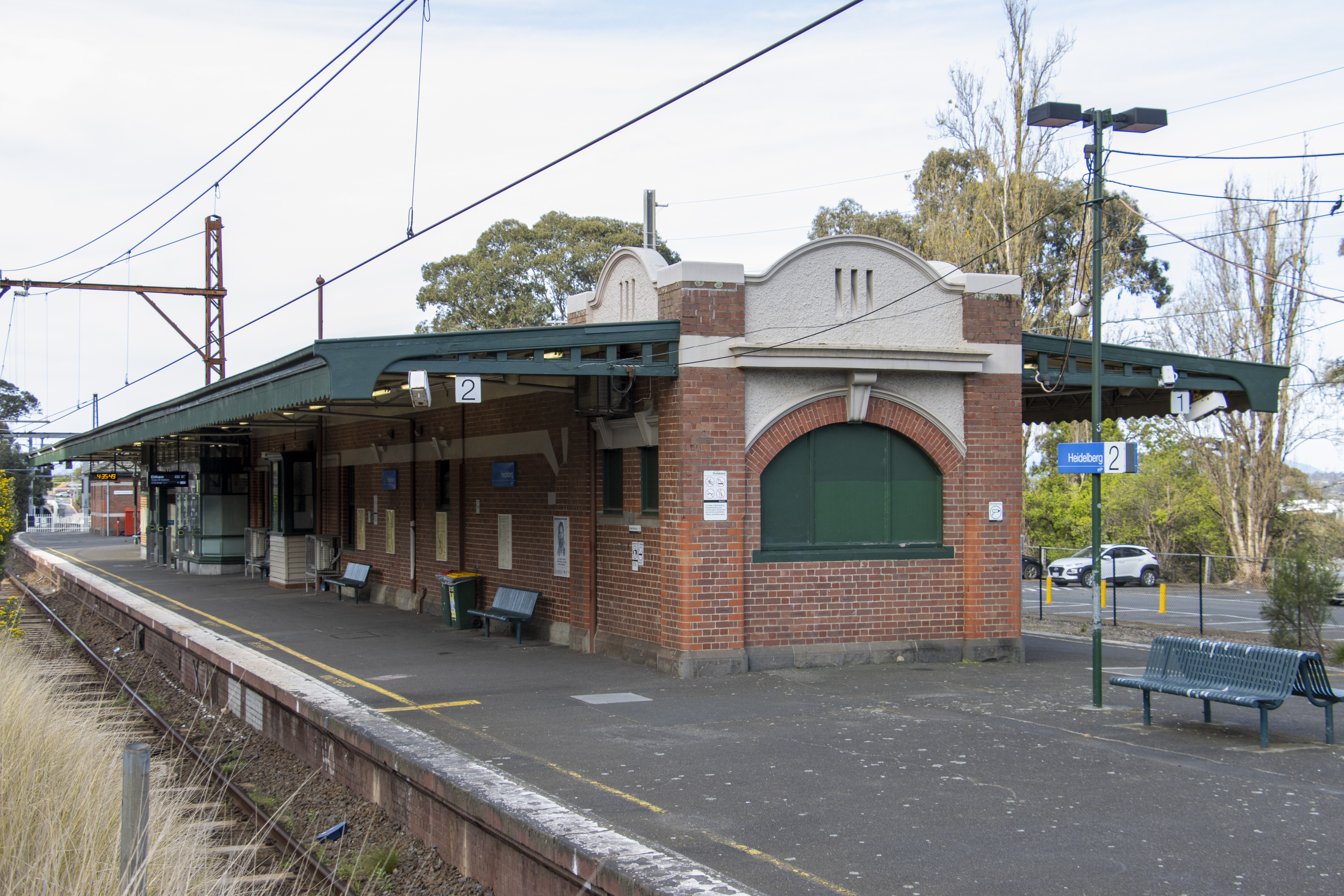
- North-east bound view of Platform 2 and station building, September 2022

General information
- Location: Studley Road, Heidelberg Victoria 3084; City of Banyule; Australia
- Coordinates: 37°45′26″S 145°03′39″E
- System: PTV commuter rail station
- Owner: VicTrack
- Operator: Metro Trains
- Line: Hurstbridge
- Distance: 14.04 kilometres from Southern Cross
- Platforms: 2 (1 island)
- Tracks: 2
- Connections: Bus

Construction
- Structure type: Ground
- Parking: 300
- Cycle facilities: Yes
- Accessible: No—steep ramp

Other information
- Status: Operational, premium station
- Station code: HDB
- Fare zone: Myki zone 1/2
- Website: Public Transport Victoria

History
- Opened: 8 May 1888; 138 years ago
- Electrified: July 1921 (1500 V DC overhead)

Passengers
- 2005–2006: 801,824
- 2006–2007: 858,534 ▲7.07%
- 2007–2008: 936,351 ▲9.06%
- 2008–2009: 952,592 ▲1.73%
- 2009–2010: 1,121,440 ▲17.72%
- 2010–2011: 1,236,574 ▲10.26%
- 2011–2012: 1,229,370 ▼0.58%
- 2012–2013: Not measured
- 2013–2014: 896,276 ▼27.09%
- 2014–2015: 855,798 ▼4.51%
- 2015–2016: 878,613 ▲2.66%
- 2016–2017: 812,613 ▼7.51%
- 2017–2018: 768,072 ▼5.48%
- 2018–2019: 791,605 ▲3.06%
- 2019–2020: 647,000 ▼18.26%
- 2020–2021: 343,900 ▼46.84%
- 2021–2022: 384,400 ▲11.77%
- 2022–2023: 605,950 ▲57.64%
- 2023–2024: 702,150 ▲15.88%
- 2024–2025: 822,300 ▲17.11%

Services
Preceding station	Metro Trains	Following station
Eaglemont towards Flinders Street	Hurstbridge line	Rosanna towards Hurstbridge
Ivanhoe towards Flinders Street	Hurstbridge line Weekday peak express services	Rosanna towards Hurstbridge
Track layout
Location

Heidelberg station is a railway station operated by Metro Trains Melbourne on the Hurstbridge line, part of the Melbourne rail network. It serves the north-eastern suburb of Heidelberg, in Melbourne, Victoria, Australia. Heidelberg station is a ground level premium station, featuring an island platform. It opened on 8 May 1888.

== History ==
When Heidelberg station opened, it was the terminus of what is now the Hurstbridge line. On 1 September 1913, the current island station officially opened.

At one time, there was a goods yard opposite Platform 1. It made way for an extension of the passenger car park, although the goods shed still exists. At one time, there were three tracks running through the station. Two served the island platform, and the third track was the last surviving stabling track. The third track was removed after a period of disuse.

Between 26 January 1942 and 6 February 1942, fourteen trains were modified to become ambulance trains, which carried returning wounded World War II servicemen from Melbourne to Heidelberg, where ambulances were waiting to take them to the Heidelberg Repatriation Hospital. On 3 November 1995, 50 years after the end of that conflict, Vin Heffernan, the member for Ivanhoe, unveiled a plaque at the station to commemorate the role of the station in the war effort.

During 1988, the former No. 4 and No. 5 tracks were abolished, along with a number of disc signal posts.

In 1992, the station received an enclosed waiting area and ticket facilities, as part of the "Travel Safe" program of the early 1990s. On 5 March 1994, after the signals had been upgraded to an electronic system, one of the decommissioned mechanical semaphore signals ("Signal No. 4") was relocated from the Melbourne side of the station to the car-park opposite Platform 1, for display purposes. Signal No. 4 had first been erected at Heidelberg in 1912. On 21 June 1996, Heidelberg was upgraded to a premium station.

At the 2016-17 Victorian State Budget, $140.2 million was allocated to duplicate the single-track between Heidelberg and Rosanna, which included a second rail tunnel alongside the existing one. That project was completed on 30 April 2018.

== Platforms and services ==
Heidelberg has one island platform with two faces. It is served by Hurstbridge line trains.

Heidelberg platform arrangement
Platform	Line	Destination	Service Type	Source
1	Hurstbridge line	Flinders Street	All stations and limited express services	
2	Hurstbridge line	Macleod, Greensborough, Eltham, Hurstbridge	All stations	

== Transport links ==
Kinetic Melbourne operates Four bus routes via Heidelberg station, under contract to Transport Victoria:

- 513 : Eltham Station – Glenroy Station (via Lower Plenty)
- 514 : Eltham Station – Glenroy Station (via Greensborough)
- 546 : Heidelberg Station – Melbourne University (Note: Route 546 services continue beyond Melbourne University to/from Moonee Ponds Junction as route 505.)
- SmartBus 903 : Altona station – Mordialloc

Ventura Bus Lines operates one route to and from Heidelberg station, under contract to Transport Victoria:

- 551 : to La Trobe University Bundoora campus
