= Diamond Creek (disambiguation) =

Diamond Creek may refer to:

- Diamond Creek, Victoria, a suburb of Melbourne, Australia, named from the tributary of the Yarra River
  - Diamond Creek Football Club
  - Diamond Creek Trail, a path that follows the creek
  - Diamond Creek railway station
- Diamond Creek (Arizona), a tributary of the Colorado River in Arizona
- Diamond Creek (California), a tributary of the South Yuba River

== See also ==
- Diamond Valley (disambiguation)
