= Dobwalls Adventure Park =

Former amusement park in Cornwall, England

- Interactive map of Dobwalls Adventure Park
- Location: Dobwalls, Cornwall, England
- Coordinates: 50°27′55.63″N 4°31′7.76″W
- Opened: 1970
- Closed: 2006
- Owner: John Southern
- Operating season: April to October (Park); All Year (Gallery)
- Area: 22 acres (89,000 m^{2})

Dobwalls Adventure Park was a family-run visitor attraction in the village of Dobwalls, near Liskeard, Cornwall. Founded in 1970 by John Southern, the park was one of Cornwall's top visitor attractions, consisting of two miniature railway networks complemented by large play areas and recreational grounds, both indoors and outdoors, an art gallery and woodland walks.

The park closed at the end of the 2006 season for redevelopment work, but in June 2007 it was announced that it would not reopen in its original form as an adventure park. The redevelopment projects stalled, with the John Southern Gallery and new camping site closing. The administrators were called in and the site, complete with many of the original buildings and landscapes still in existence were put up for sale by sealed bid auction.

== Miniature railway networks ==
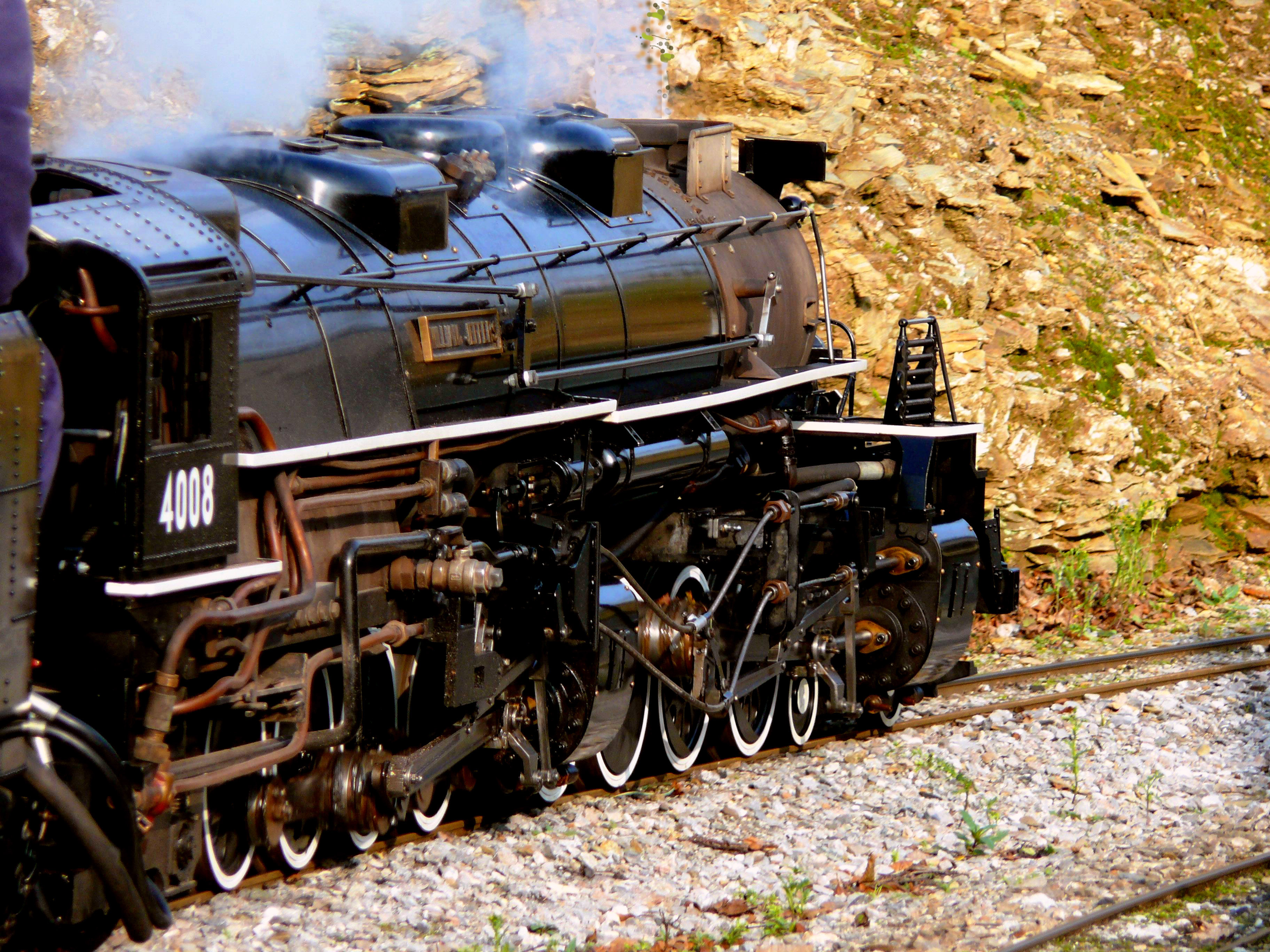
Locomotive 4008 shortly before the line closed

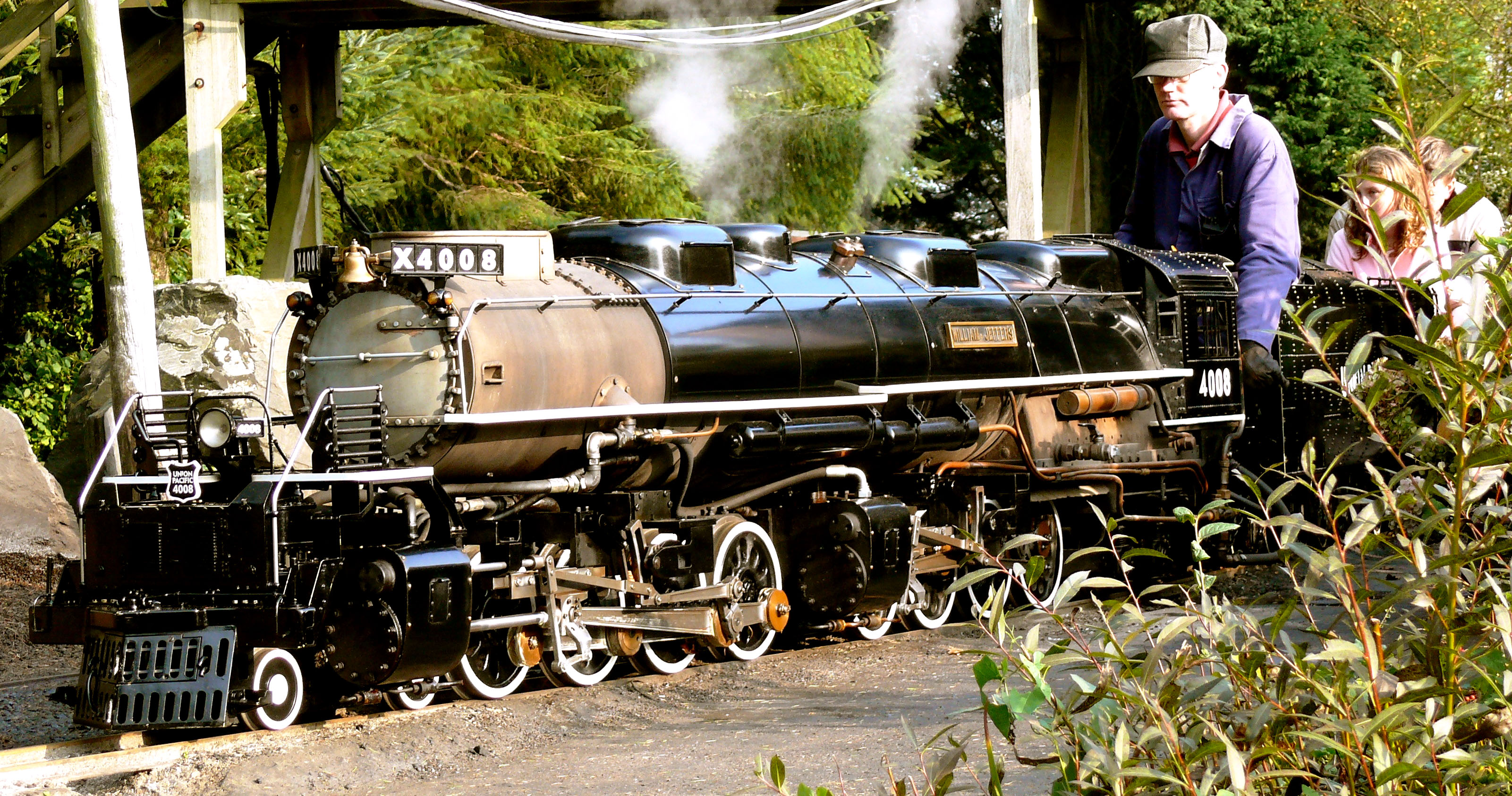
Locomotive 4008 preparing to depart from the base station

The main attractions in the park were the 7 1/4 in (184 mm) gauge miniature railway networks that were based on two very different American railroad routes, the Rio Grande Cumbres Pass line and the Sherman Hill route of the Union Pacific Railroad; passengers were whisked through tunnels, over bridges and trestles and into canyons.

The Rio Grande line was opened in 1970 and included a 1:25 (4%) gradient, the steepest climb on a passenger-carrying miniature railway. The line wove in and out of a forest, recreating the Colorado railroads.

The Union Pacific route was opened in 1979, due to the success of the Rio Grande system, and added another miniature railway network to travel on. It was modelled closely on the real Union Pacific Sherman Hill line in Wyoming and had a ruling gradient of 1:66 (1.51%), a very steep hill for a 7 1/4 in (184 mm) railway.

In October 2006 it was announced that after over 25 years in operation, the Union Pacific railroad was to close. The last train ran on 29 October 2006. June 2007 saw the announcement that the remaining Rio Grande route would not reopen for the 2008 season, and would be replaced by a shorter simplified line.

=== Locomotives ===
The locomotives were as follows:

Steam Locomotives
Type	Number	Name	Status	Image
Union Pacific 4-8-8-4	X4008	"William Jeffers"	Now in private hands. Has been used at Diamond Valley Railway in Australia. Currently in storage	
Union Pacific 4-8-4	818	"Queen of Wyoming"	Current location Australia stored.	
Union Pacific 4-8-4	838	"Queen of Nebraska"	Current location Australia stored.	
Rio Grande 2-8-2	488	"General Palmer"	Currently location Australia	
Rio Grande 2-8-2	498	"Otto Mears"	Current location Australia stored.	
Freelance 2-6-2	88	"David Curwen"	Sold in 2005. Current location Eastleigh Lakeside Railway	

Diesel Locomotives
Type	Number	Name	Status	Image
Union Pacific DDA40X Do-Do	6908	"Centennial"	Currently location Australia (Selby)	
Rio Grande GP35 Bo-Bo	3008	"Matthias Baldwin"	Current location Australia stored.	
Santa Fe FP45 Co-Co	5908	"Pioneer"	Currently location Australia (Selby)	
Amtrak E8	248	"Spirit of America"	Currently location Australia (Selby)	

When the park closed in 2006 all the locomotives were made available for sale, and in early 2008 eight of them were sold to a gentleman in Dorset to run at Plowman's Railroad near Ferndown in Dorset. The Dorset railway is no longer running and the locomotives have since been exported to Australia as part of a private project to build a seven and a quarter inch railroad next to the 'Puffing Billy Railway' in Australia.

As an update, the seven-and-a-quarter railway will not be built. The local council has denied it.

== Redevelopment work ==
The park was closed for major redevelopment including the construction of new holiday lodges, a new arts centre and various other adjustments designed to boost income to the park at a time when many theme parks are feeling increasing competition and falling profits. The Go Kart track was due be demolished, and some of the play equipment removed. The Southern Gallery was due to remain until its new home is completed. Since then the land was available for sale in 2012.

== See also ==
- Ridable miniature railway
- Diamond Valley Railway
