= Maroondah Aqueduct Trail =

- Length: 7.7km
- Location: Melbourne, Victoria, Australia
- Difficulty: Travel anti-clockwise then easy
- Hills: Steep in a clockwise direction
- Train: Eltham station
- Tram: None

The Maroondah Aqueduct Trail is a shared use path which follows the disused Maroondah Aqueduct through the outer eastern suburbs of Eltham and Research in Melbourne, Victoria, Australia.

This entry includes the Main Road path as part of the total length of 7.7 km.

== Following the Path ==
Starting at Edendale Farm, situated at Gaston's Rd, Eltham, follow the Main Rd shared path to research and onward through two roundabouts, taking a left turn at the research Performing Arts Centre / Little Theatre then up along the Old Main Rd which parallels the current Main Rd, past Candlebark Crt, heading past the Industrial estate until it meets with the Maroondah Aqueduct Trail just behind Grimes & Sons Factory. It is, as a side note, 360m east of the orange/red sculpture The Breeze, by Sri Lankan-born Edward Ginger, located outside the Eltham Little Theatre.

The Maroondah Aqueduct Trail loops back to Diamond Creek Trail, meeting back up at the Allendale Road Railway Crossing. At this point, there is access to Edendale Farm on the left, and Diamond Creek and its cafes on the right.

The Maroondah Aqueduct Trail has steeper grades when cycled in a clockwise direction. Across the railway line, there is a climb and false-finish at Zigzag Road. There is a secondary ascent on Allendale Road, which, whilst shorter, will test cyclists as it crests a second sharp rise.

The path passes through large stands of pine trees and has a distinctly rural atmosphere, a diversion if using the Diamond Creek Trail.

There exists an additional ~3 km section of the Maroondah Aqueduct Trail located about 3 km kilometres away to the east in Kangaroo Ground, starting at Henley Road and ending at Calwell Road.

== Connections ==
Maroondah Aqueduct Trail meets the Diamond Creek Trail at each end.

Main Road path: west end at 37.703339°S 145.153502°E; east end at 37.700258°S 145.189334°E.

Maroondah Aqueduct Trail: west end at 37.688537°S 145.156093°E east end at 37.700258°S 145.189334°E.
