= Diamond Creek Trail =

Path that follows the creek in Melbourne, Victoria, Australia

- Entrance to Edendale Farm in Eltham
- Length: 11 km (6.8 mi)
- Location: Melbourne, Victoria, Australia
- Difficulty: Easy
- Hazards: Unguarded railway crossing
- Surface: Asphalt or concrete path
- Hills: Fitzsimons lane
- Water: Diamond Creek, Eltham
- Train: Hurstbridge Line
- Tram: None
- Bus: 580, 343

The Diamond Creek Trail is a shared-use path for cyclists and pedestrians, running along Diamond Creek through the north-eastern outer suburbs of Melbourne, Victoria, Australia.

The trail follows the creek and the railway line to Eltham, where it connects to the Main Yarra Trail (also known as the Yarra River Trail). The path is generally flat with minor inclines and offers views of parklands, the creek valley, and semi-rural suburbia. It is fully paved with either concrete or asphalt and is relatively unaffected by tree roots.

Designed more for leisurely travel than high-speed commuting, the trail is used by walkers, families, children, dog walkers (dogs must be leashed), and the elderly. Certain sections of the path are narrow, with several 90-degree bends for added interest.

Despite its scenic appeal, the trail is not well signposted and includes some hazardous road crossings. Notable attractions include the Edendale Farm Community Environment Centre and the Diamond Valley Railway.

== Path ==
The trail begins near Diamond Creek station; it is unmarked there. After crossing Main Hurstbridge Road and the road bridge, the trail starts beside the toilet block at Diamond Creek Reserve.

It crosses Allendale Road near the rail crossing, then follows the track. Edendale Farm, located between there and Eltham, is visible from the back fence, although an admission fee applies.

Wattletree Road, near Edendale Farm marks a junction with a trail that follows Main Road and connects to the Maroondah Aqueduct Trail. The Maroondah Aqueduct Trail loops back to the Diamond Creek Trail at Allendale Road.

The trail continues along Railway Parade and crosses the railway at an automated crossing, following the footpath into Eltham’s business district. Eltham railway station is approximately 300 metres beyond the crossing.

A gap of around 200 metres occurs in the trail between Elsa Court crossing and the tennis centre at Eltham Central Park. At Withers Way, a detour to Montsalvat can be taken by crossing Main Road and following Dalton Street.

The trail winds through the park and reaches Eltham Lower Park, known for the Diamond Valley Railway. On the south side of the park, it connects to the footbridge across the Yarra River, leading to the Yarra River Trail, about one kilometre east of Westerfolds Park.

Cycling the trail at a leisurely pace takes about an hour. The nearest railway station beyond Eltham is Heidelberg, 14 kilometres along the Yarra River Trail.

== Landmarks ==
- Edendale Farm Community
- Montsalvat
- Diamond Valley Railway

== Connections ==
The northern end of the Diamond Creek Trail connects with a trail along Main Road, which leads to the Maroondah Aqueduct Trail. The southern end intersects with the Yarra River Trail.

Coordinates: north - 37.671818°S 145.157578°E, south - 37.739666°S 145.143259°E.
