= Nina Christesen =

Russian-born Australian academic in Russian language studies (1911–2001)

Nina Mikhailovna Christesen AM (23 December 1911 – 8 August 2001) (née Maximoff) pioneered the study of Russian in Australia and founded the Department of Russian Language and Literature at the University of Melbourne in 1946.

== Personal life and education ==
Christesen was born on 23 December 1911 in Blagoveshchensk, Russia to Mikhail (Michael) Ivanovitch (6 Sep 1885–1967) and Tatiana Siemenovna (c.1889–1979) Maximoff. In 1917 she and her mother left Saint Petersburg to join her father, a captain in the merchant navy, in Harbin, Manchuria where she began her secondary education. In 1925 the family migrated to Brisbane, Australia. Christesen gained admittance in 1926 to the Commercial High School in Brisbane where she passed the Junior Public Examination in 1930. In February 1931 Christesen passed the Supplementary and Adult Matriculation Examination, giving her admission to the University of Queensland from which she later graduated, receiving a Dip.Ed in 1938. She received her British Naturalization Certificate on 19 December 1933. While teaching at the Institute of Modern Languages at Queensland University she met Clem Christesen who was taking lessons in German. They were married at St John's Cathedral in Brisbane on 23 January 1942. In 1945 the couple moved to Melbourne. They moved into "Stanhope" in Eltham (designed by architect Harold Desbrowe-Annear), and lived there for the rest of their lives.

In 1947 her portrait was painted by the artist Lina Bryans.

Christesen died on 8 August 2001, predeceasing her husband by two years. Judith Armstrong wrote The Christesen Romance about their life together.

== Work ==
Following graduation from the University of Queensland, Christesen taught French at St Aidan's Church of England School for Girls in Corinda from 1936-1944, a tutor at The Women's College and lecturer in Russian at the Institute of Modern Languages at the University of Queensland.

Being appointed full-time lecturer in Russian at the University of Melbourne in 1946, Christesen established the Department of Russian Language and Literature the following year and remained at its head until her retirement in 1977. Christesen remained active in the Australian Russian community and continued to work tirelessly in promoting Russian language and culture.

According to Jane Sullivan's obituary, "Nina campaigned for a new Russian department at the university, but was so unassuming that she did not apply for the job of a founding lectureship in Russian language and literature. She had to be persuaded to sit down and type an application.

Nina later wrote:

"In every way I was obliged to begin from scratch at Melbourne University. There was no established department, no staff, no suitable textbooks, no library (except my own), no secretarial support, and nobody to whom I could turn for advice on how best to structure the courses. To say the least, funding was inadequate. The only available typewriter with a keyboard of Russian characters belonged to the CSIRO, and I was allowed to use it only during lunchtime. I could not persuade the Registrar to spend fifty pounds on a fount of Russian matrices owned by an aged priest in Sydney, so I bought it myself and taught compositors at a commercial printery how to set the type for our examination papers and texts. I wonder if a man would have fared better? I am not altogether sure of that."

During her career, she was a guest lecturer at the Universities of Oxford and Moscow, and visiting fellow at the Australian National University. She founded and edited the Melbourne Slavonic Studies journal. She was on the executive committee of the International Slavists' Association and various other scholarly bodies. She published "articles on pedagogy, Tolstoy and Pushkin in scholarly journals". She was admired equally for "her scholarship, inspirational teaching and her warmth, kindness and generosity".

Her papers are held in the University of Melbourne Archives, including correspondence with academics around the world.

== Awards and recognition ==
Christesen was awarded an Honorary Master of Arts degree by the University of Melbourne in April 1959.

The book, Essays to Honour Nina Christesen, Founder of Russian Studies in Australia, edited by Judith Armstrong and Rae Slonek was published in 1979.

In the 1987 Australia Day Honours Christesen was made a Member of the Order of Australia "in recognition of service to education, particularly to the study of Slavic language and culture".
