= Diamond Valley =

Diamond Valley may refer to:

== Places ==
=== Australia ===
- Diamond Valley, Queensland, a rural locality
- Division of Diamond Valley, Victoria
- Shire of Diamond Valley, a former local government area in Victoria

=== Canada ===
- Diamond Valley, Alberta, a town formed via the amalgamation of the towns of Black Diamond and Turner Valley

=== United States ===
- Diamond Valley (California), a valley in the Plains of Leon in Riverside County, California
- Diamond Valley Lake, a reservoir in Riverside County, California
- Diamond Valley (Nevada)
- Diamond Valley (Washington County, Utah)

== Other uses ==
- Diamond Valley College, a public co-educational school in Diamond Creek, Victoria, Australia
- Diamond Valley United SC, a soccer club based in Greensborough, Victoria
- Diamond Valley Football League, former name of the Northern Football Netball League, Diamond Creek, Victoria
- Diamond Valley Railway, a ridable miniature railway at Eltham Lower Park, Eltham, Victoria
- Motu Patlu & The Race to The Diamond Valley, an Indian animated TV film based on the animated TV show Motu Patlu
