= Clem Christesen =

Australian magazine editor

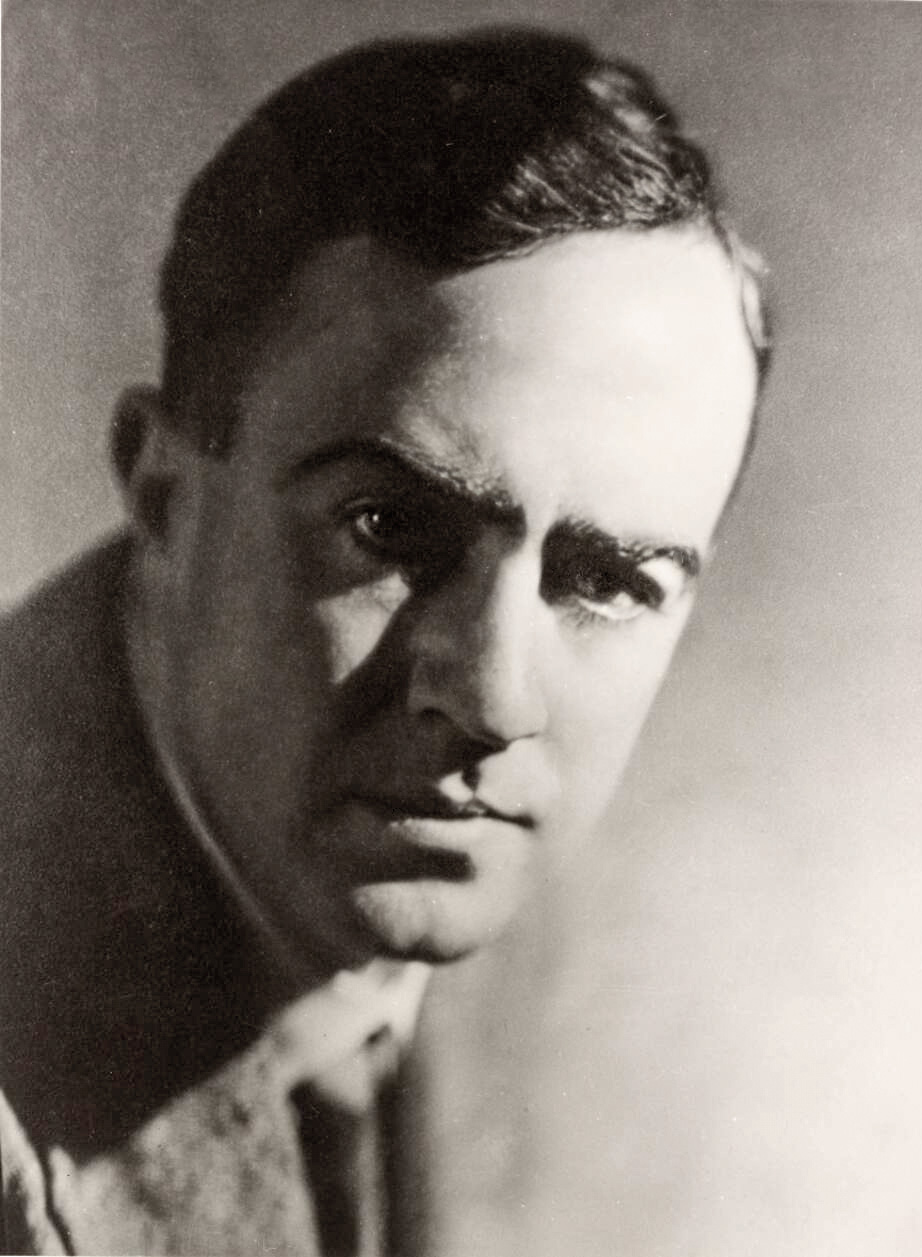
- 1930s portrait of Clem Christesen
- Born: Clement Byrne Christesen; 28 October 1911; Townsville, Queensland, Australia
- Died: 28 June 2003 (aged 91); Templestowe, Victoria, Australia
- Education: University of Queensland
- Occupation: Literary editor
- Spouse: Nina Mikhailovna Maximov (m. 1942–2001)
- Parent(s): Patrick Christesen; Susan Byrne

Clement Byrne Christesen (28 October 1911 – 28 June 2003) was the founder of the Australian literary magazine Meanjin. He served as the magazine's editor from 1940 until 1974.

== Biography ==
=== Early years ===
Clement Byrne Christesen was born and spent his early life in Townsville. His father, Patrick, was of mixed Irish and Danish descent, while his mother Susan (née Byrne), was mostly Irish. The family moved to Brisbane in 1917, where Christesen later attended the University of Queensland.

=== Career ===
After leaving university, Christesen worked as a journalist at Brisbane's Courier-Mail and the Telegraph, as well as a publicity officer for the Queensland government.

Christesen was founding editor of Meanjin Papers which was first published in 1940, following his return from overseas travel.

With an offer of full-time salary and commercial support for the publication, the magazine and its editor moved to the University of Melbourne in 1945.

He retired as editor in 1974.

=== Personal life ===
In January 1942, he married Nina Maximoff, only daughter of Captain and Mrs. Michael Maximoff of South Brisbane, Queensland. Nina Christesen would found the Russian Department at the University of Melbourne. In the 1940s they moved to "Stanhope" in Eltham, Victoria.

== Awards ==
Christesen was granted several awards and state honours in recognition of his achievements:

- Officer of the Order of British Empire, 1 January 1962, In recognition of service to Australian literature
- Medal of the Order of Australia, 26 January 2000, for service to the development of Australian creative and critical writing as founder and editor of Meanjin Quarterly
- Centenary Medal, 1 January 2001, for service to Australian society and the humanities in writing and literature

== Bibliography ==
=== Books ===
- The Hand of Memory : Selected Stories and Verse (1970)

=== Short story collection ===
- The Troubled Eyes of Women (1990)

=== Poetry collections ===
- Having Loved (1970)
- Ebb-Tide : Selected Verse (1997)

=== Edited ===
- Australian Heritage : A Prose Anthology, Longmans (1949)
- On Native Grounds : Australian writing from Meanjin quarterly, Selected with a preface by C.B. Christesen (1968)

=== Selected articles ===
- Christesen, C. B. (March 1965). "The 'heart' of a university". Editorial Comment. Meanjin Quarterly. 24 (1): 139–143.

=== Christesen's life and work ===
- Davidson, Jim (2022). Emperors in Lilliput : Clem Christesen of Meanjin and Stephen Murray-Smith of Overland. Carlton, Vic.: The Miegunyah Press.

== Death ==
Christesen died on 28 June 2003 at Templestowe nursing home two years after his wife's death. "He was lucid right to the end," said his niece Nina Joan Christesen.

== Sources ==
- Lee, Jenny (2004), "Clem Christesen and his Legacy", Australian Literary Studies, vol. 21, no. 3, pp. 410–412
- Hergenhan, Laurie (2003), "Clem Christesen (1911–2003)" (PDF), in Bennett, Bruce (ed.), Proceedings of the Australian Academy of the Humanities, vol. 28, Marrickville, NSW, Australia: Southwood Press, pp. 45–46, ISBN 0-909897-54-9, archived from the original (PDF) on 26 March 2009
- Brimfield, Emma (11 June 2003), "Clem Christesen", 150 Years: 150 Stories, archived from the original on 9 June 2007
- Clem Christessen 1911–2003 at Australian Academy of the Humanities
