= Eltham, Victoria =

Eltham
- Suburb
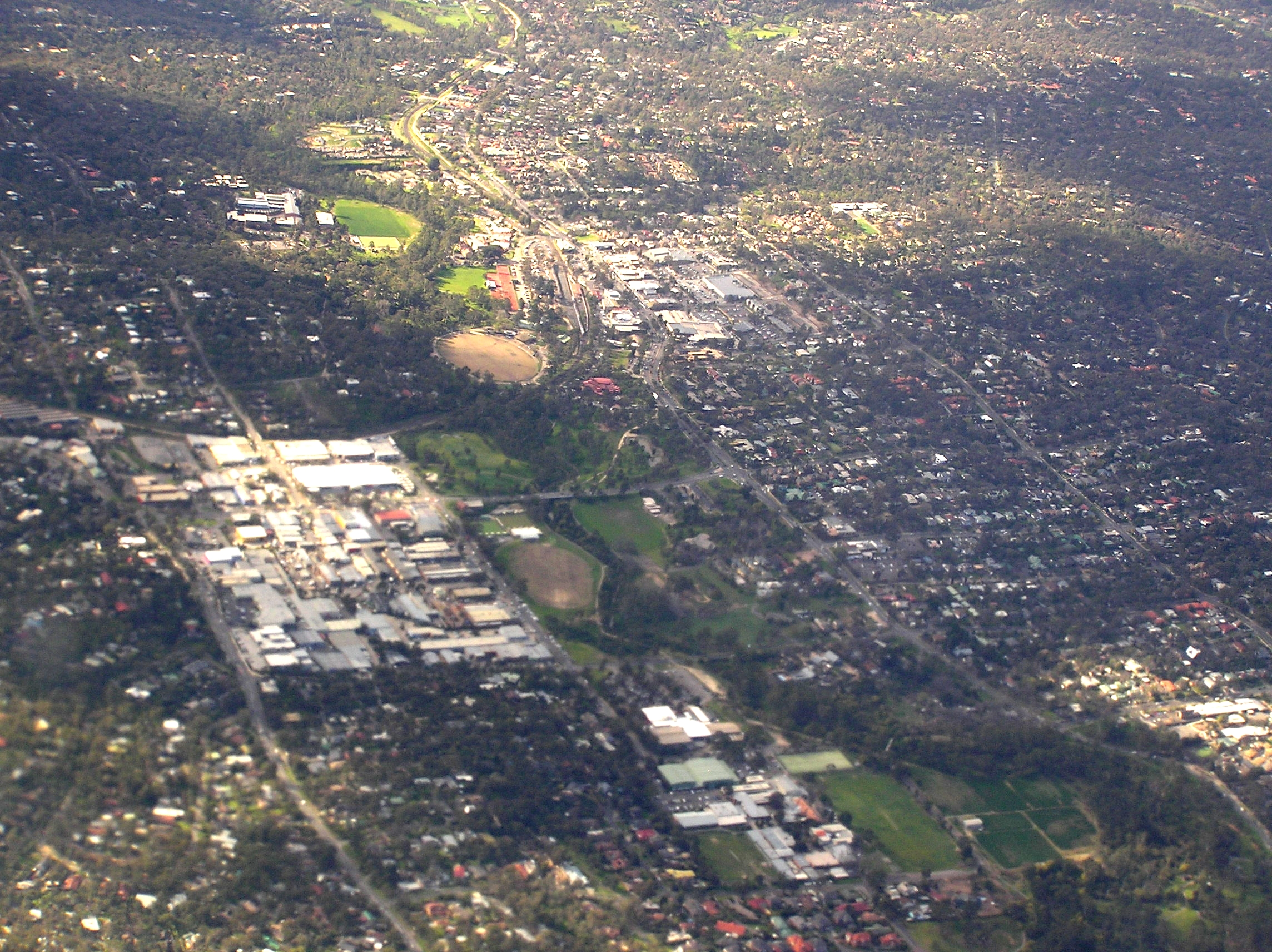
- Aerial photo of Eltham from the south-east

- Interactive map of Eltham
- Coordinates: 37.715°S 145.158°E
- Country: Australia
- State: Victoria
- City: Melbourne
- LGA: Shire of Nillumbik
- Location: 20 km (12 mi) from Melbourne

Government
  - State electorate: Eltham
  - Federal division: Jagajaga

Area
  - Total: 13.2 km^{2} (5.1 sq mi)

Population
  - Total: 18,847 (2021 census)
  - Density: 1,428/km^{2} (3,698/sq mi)
- Postcode: 3095
Suburbs around Eltham
Briar Hill	Eltham North	Research
Montmorency	Eltham	Research
Lower Plenty	Templestowe	Warrandyte

Eltham (/ˈɛlθəm/) is a suburb of Melbourne, 20 km (12 mi) north-east of the Central Business District, located within the Shire of Nillumbik local government area. Eltham recorded a population of 18,847 at the 2021 census.

== History ==
A reserve for a village at the junction of the Diamond Creek and Yarra River is shown on maps around 1848. By 1851 the first Crown allotments were being subdivided and sold, along with a private subdivision developed by J. M. Holloway, known as Little Eltham. At this time, the town's centre was located around the intersection of Pitt Street and Main Road. An early settler was Henry Dendy who operated a flour mill.

Eltham Post Office opened on 1 February 1854.

The first Eltham Cemetery Trust was appointed in February 1860. The Eltham Court House was built in 1860 and is listed on the Victorian Heritage Database. The Eltham Magistrates' Court closed on 1 February 1985.

St Margaret's Church commenced construction in 1861 at 10 John St Eltham.

The Evelyn Observer was a weekly newspaper published from 1873 to 1942. It had various titles over the years. Digitsed copies can be accessed for various dates via Trove. Other local newspapers have included Eltham and Whittlesea Shires Advertiser and Diamond Creek Valley Advocate (1917-1922) and Eltham and Whittlesea Shire Advertiser (1940-1942) These papers can also be accessed via Trove.

The Eltham Hotel was established in 1867 and continues to be in business.

The arrival of the railway line in 1902 drew business further north along Main Road to the current town centre.

A war memorial in the form of an obelisk of granite was unveiled 3 August 1919 in what was then the centre of the township. In the 1960s it was relocated to the front of the Eltham RSL sub branch. It was moved again in 2010 in front of the Eltham War Memorial Building Complex. The Eltham War Memorial Building Complex recognises those who served and died in World War 2. The community complex originally featured an infant welfare centre, war memorial gates and a wrought iron arch, memorial garden, pre-school and children's library.

Eltham Presbyterian Church opened in 1958.

The Eltham Refugee Housing and Support Project was delivered in partnership with St Vincent's Health Australia and CatholicCare to provide accommodation and settlement support to newly arrived refugees from Syria and Iraq. From November 2016 to October 2018, refugees were provided with affordable accommodation in refurbished units on the site of St Vincent's Care Services Eltham Aged Care facility. During this time, CatholicCare provided tenancy and settlement support.

Leader Community Newspapers published the Diamond Valley Leader which included Eltham in its reporting area for some years before it ceased publication in June 2020.

The historic courthouse, the oldest building in the Shire of Nillumbik was restored by Ducon Building Solutions and RBA Architects and Conservation Consultants and completed by March 2022.

=== Heritage listings ===
St Margaret's Church, designed by Nathaniel Billing and built in Gothic Revival style in 1861, was listed on the Victorian Heritage Register on 29 November 1979. The first vicar was Robert Mackie.

== Geography ==
=== Climate ===
Eltham High School has operated a publicly accessible weather station since 2003, providing live and historical weather data.

== Demographics ==
At the 2021 Australian census, Eltham recorded a population of 18,847 people living in 7,027 dwellings. The median age was 43, 5 years higher than the state and national median of 38. 37.5% of residents aged 15 and older had a bachelor's degree or above, higher than the state average of 29.2%. The top ancestries in Eltham were English (40.5%), Australian (34.6%), Irish (14.2%), Scottish (12.1%), and Italian (8.2%). Most (51.2%) had no religious affiliation, with Catholicism (20.5%), Anglicanism (8.0%), and Eastern Orthodox (2.5%) being the most popular religious affiliations.

== Culture ==
=== Appeal to artists ===
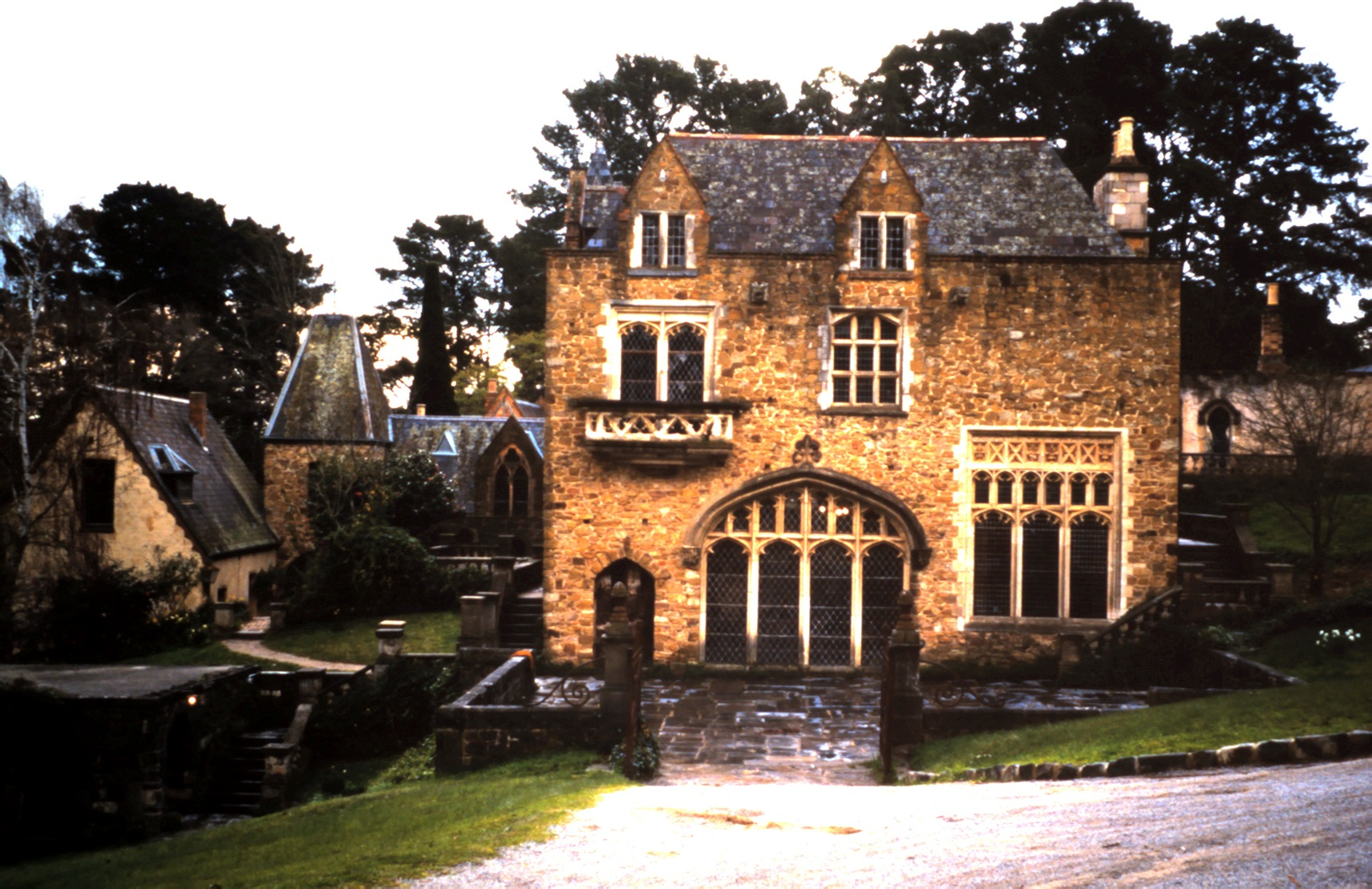
Buildings at the Montsalvat artists' colony, Eltham, Victoria

Eltham is famous for the Montsalvat artist community, which built a rustic set of medieval-style buildings in the 1930s.

Aside from the Montsalvat artist community, Eltham has also been home to artists such as Walter Withers and Neil Douglas, as well as to writers such as Alan Marshall and Mervyn Skipper.

== Attractions and Amenities ==
Eltham Library

Located in the main areas of Eltham itself are the Eltham Cemetery, Eltham Library (operated by Yarra Plenty Regional Library), and Senior Citizen's Centre (1967).

The Eltham Farmers' Market is also located in Eltham's main shopping area, and opens on Sundays.

Across Diamond Creek, the Eltham Leisure Centre and Victoria State Emergency Service Nillumbik Unit are found around Eltham's industrial area.

=== Diamond Valley Railway ===
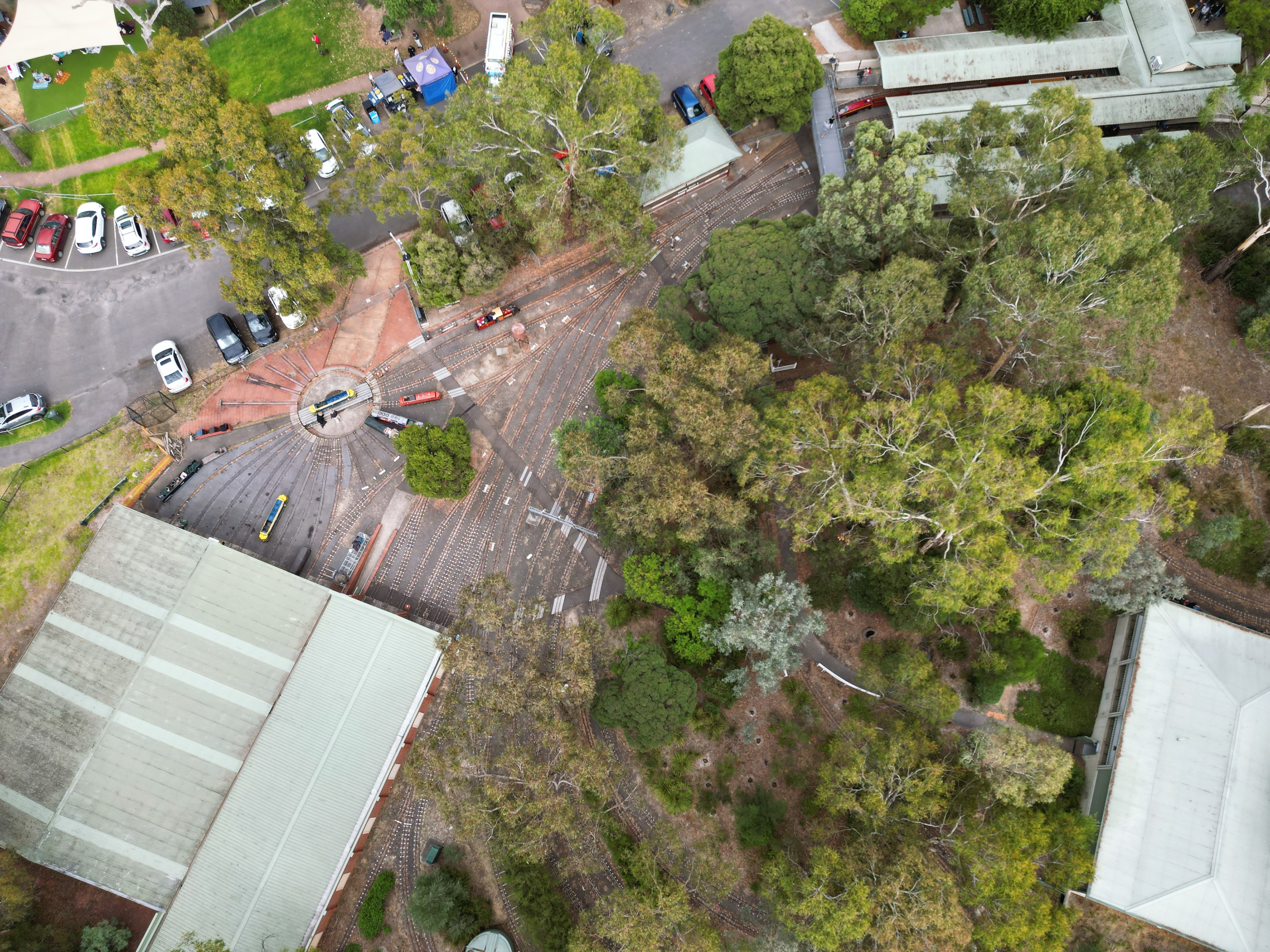
Aerial perspective of the Diamond Valley Railway. March 2023.

The Diamond Valley Railway, the largest ridable miniature railway in Australia, is located in Eltham Lower Park at the southern edge of the suburb, and has operated since 1960.

=== Parks ===
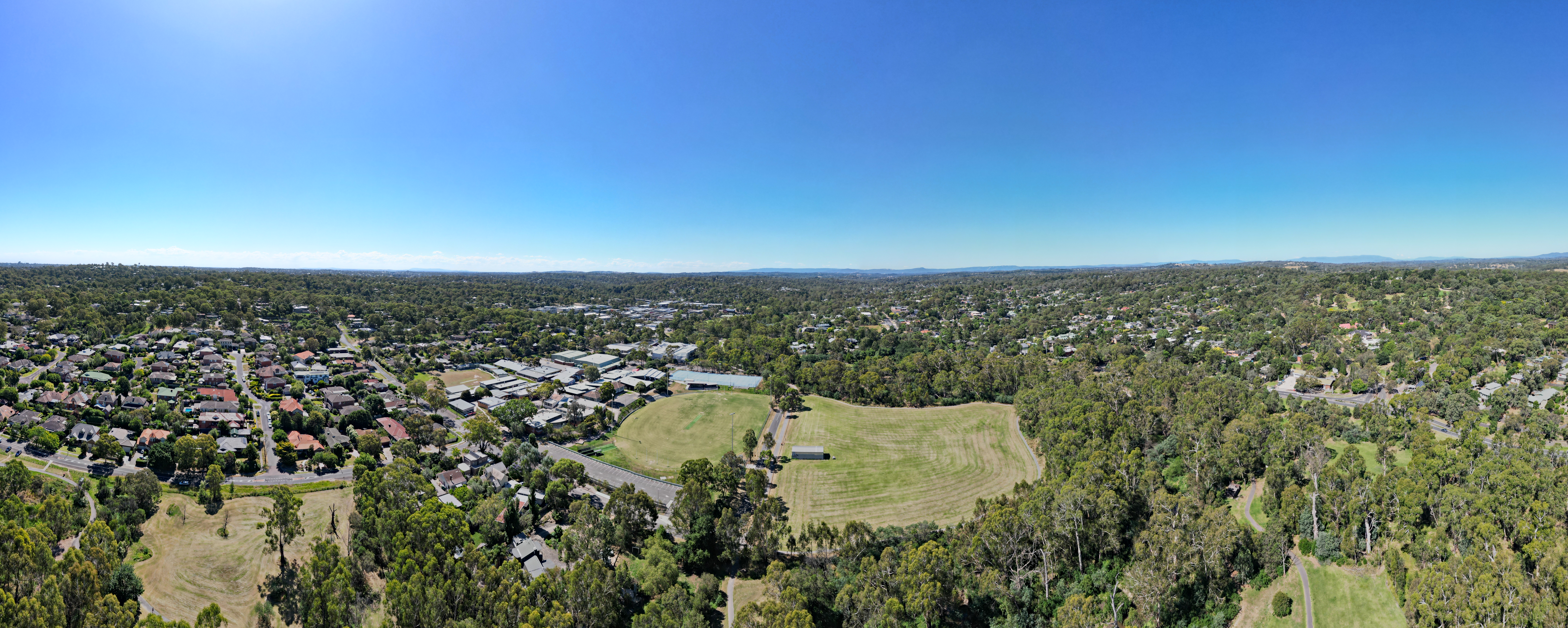
Eltham High School is next to Barak Bushland reserve

Large areas surrounding Eltham are part of Green Wedge areas in the Shire of Nillumbik, leaving extensive areas undeveloped within and to three sides of the suburb.

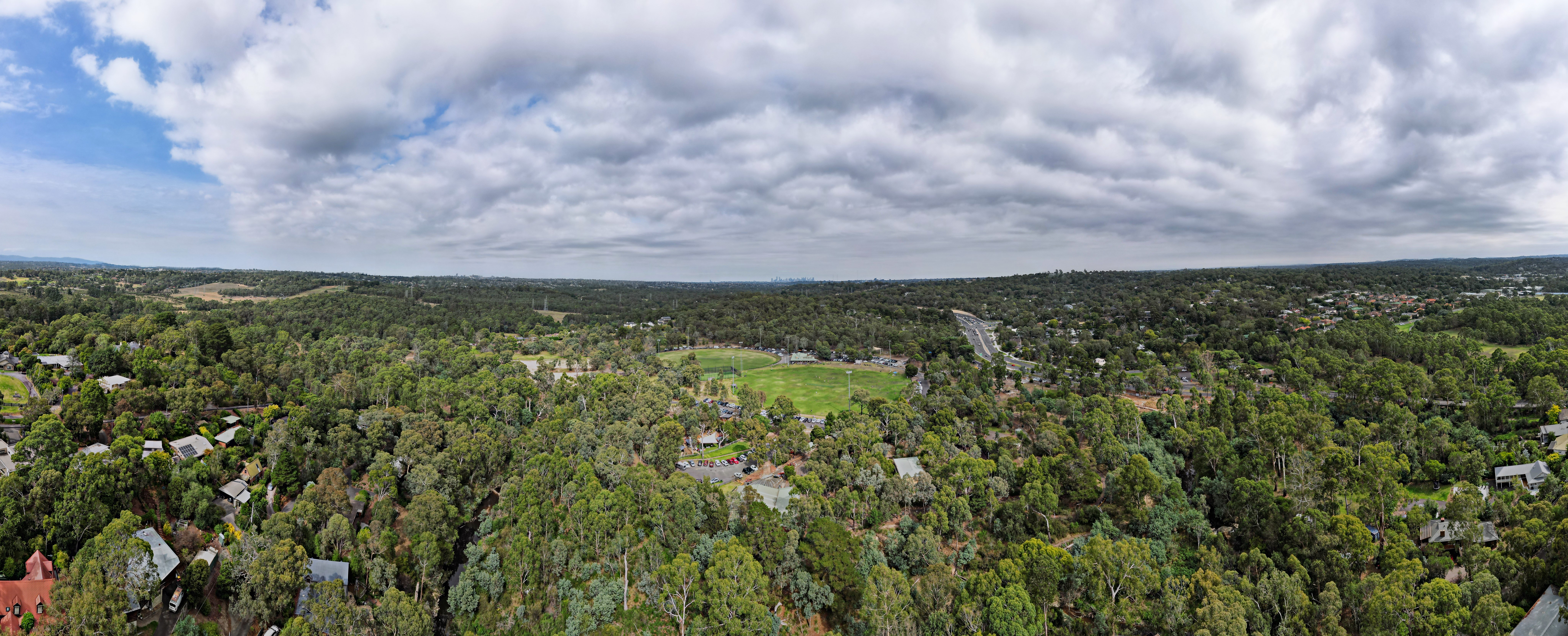
Aerial panorama of Eltham facing the Melbourne CBD. March 2023.

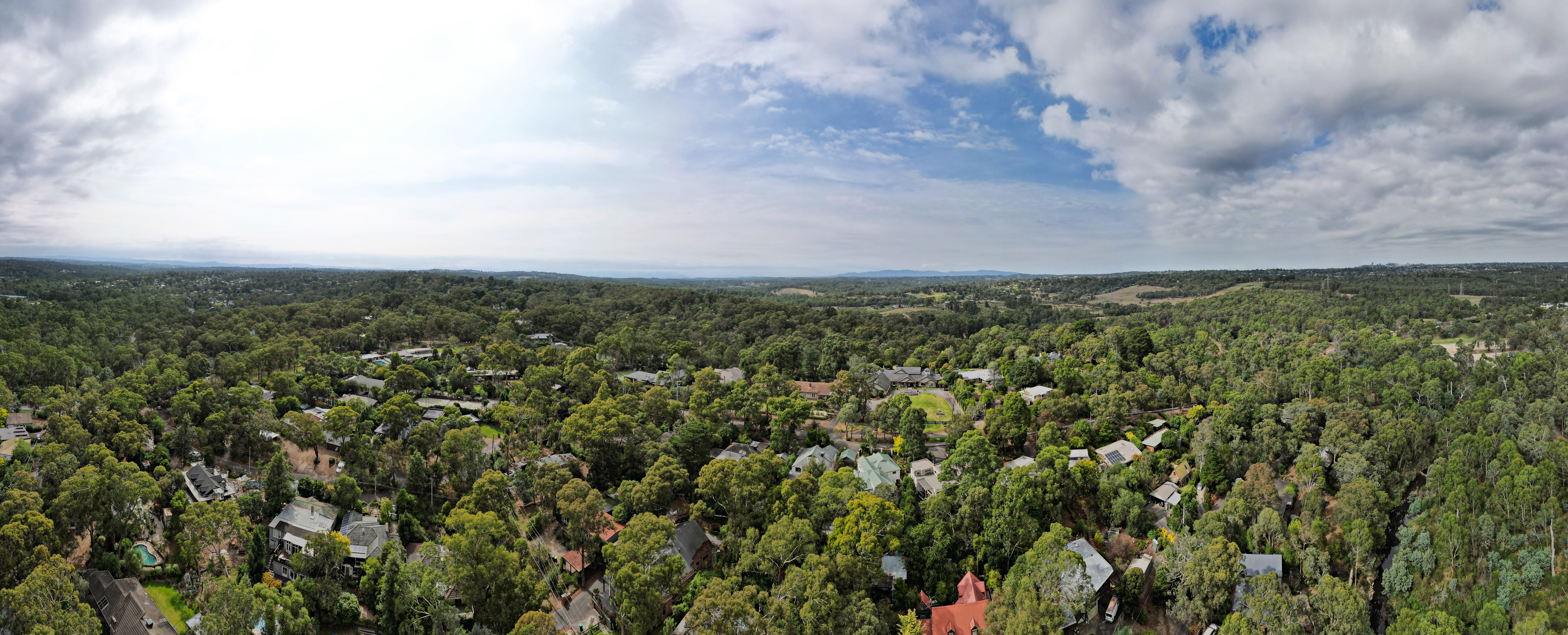
Aerial perspective of Eltham facing the Great Dividing Range. March 2023.

Alistair Knox Park^{(37.7187°S 145.1445°E)} is named after Alistair Knox, a famous local landscape architect who specialised in mud brick. The park is located on Main Road near the central Eltham shopping strip. The Eltham Library is located nearby. The kids playground is found within the open and lightly wooded forest. Facilities include an old wooden playground, toilets, barbecues, a duck pond, and a sculpture.

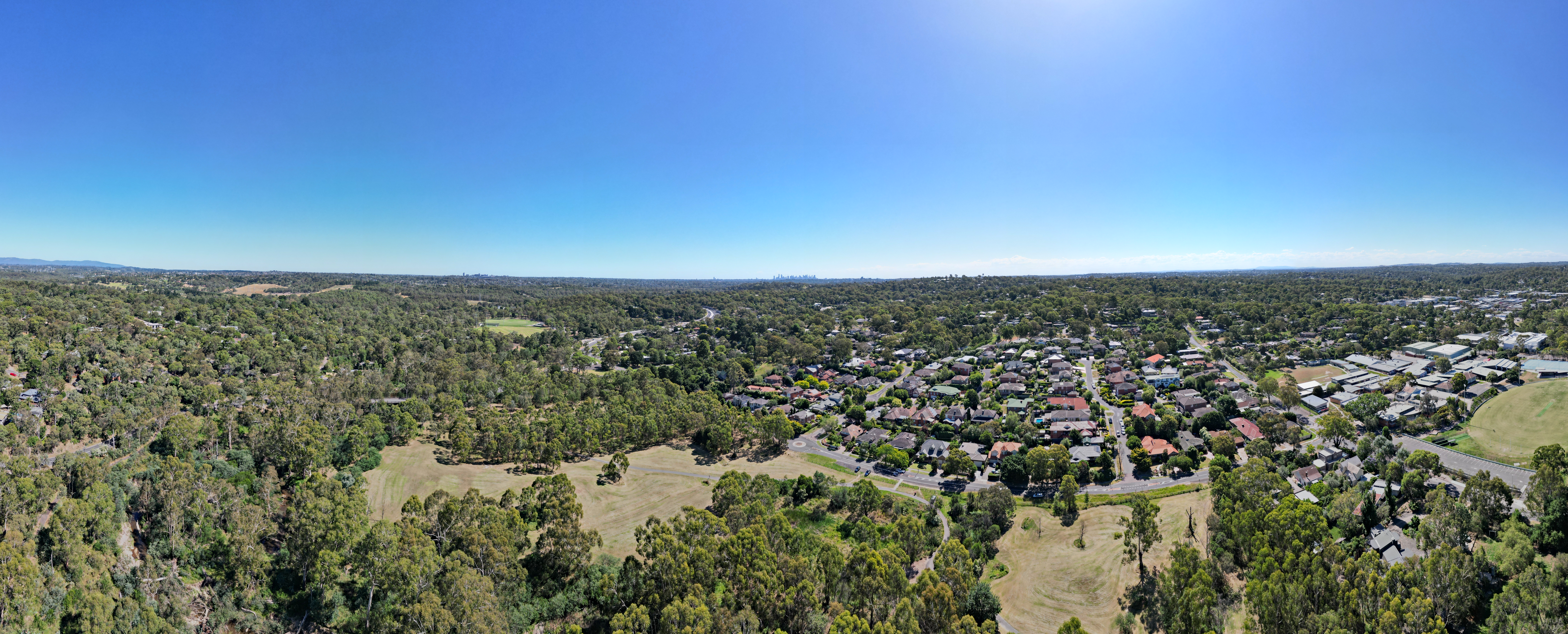
Barak Bushland reserve from above. January 2023.

Alan Marshall Reserve is located on the corner of Main Road and Leane Drive. It was named for the author who lived part of his life locally. The park has been there since at least 2007.

Barak Bushlands are at the location previously known as Falkiner Street Reserve, located to the west of Wingrove Park along the Diamond Creek. They were named for Indigenous leader William Barak by Nillumbik Shire in 2004.

Laughing Waters park is a bushland named after the sound of the kookaburras, and the water running over the rocks in the nearby waterhole, which is a busy spot for tourists. It was a popular spot for the artists of Montsalvat to live and paint. Closer to the Yarra River, it is riparian forest, inland it is damp dry open forest.

=== Trails ===
The Diamond Creek trail passes through Eltham.

The Maroondah Aqueduct Trail is also found at the suburb's northern boundary.

== Sports ==
World champions Emma Carney (triathlete) and Cadel Evans (racing cyclist) are both Eltham residents.

The suburb is home to the Eltham Wildcats, Eltham Redbacks Football Club and Eltham Cricket Club.

Eltham Old Collegians Football Club compete in the VAFA.

Eltham Football Club, known as the Panthers is an Australian Rules Club competing in the Northern Football League. Eltham Rugby Union Football Club is centrally located in Bridge St with teams for all groups including Masters.

The suburb is home to the Eltham Tennis Club, Eltham Netball Club and Eltham Bowling Club (which has two synthetic greens), and Eltham Lacrosse Club.

Eltham Little Athletics Club is one of the largest of the eight clubs competing weekly at the Diamond Valley Little Athletics Centre at Willinda Park, Greensborough.

== Transport ==
Eltham railway station is located on the Hurstbridge Line, with services operating south-west towards the City Loop via Heidelberg and north-east towards Hurstbridge.

The station is also a major bus interchange for north-eastern Melbourne. The SmartBus Route 902 orbital is the most notable, connecting south towards Doncaster and Chelsea station and west towards Airport West. Other notable routes include 513/514 to Glenroy, 578/579 towards Warrandyte, and route 582 around the eastern residential areas of Eltham itself.

=== Railway trestle bridge ===
Located approximately 200m from Eltham station towards the City, Eltham is notable for its historic wooden railway trestle bridge, constructed in 1902 as part of the extension of the Hurstbridge line from Heidelberg to Eltham. It is the last wooden trestle bridge used by suburban trains in Melbourne, and one of few in all of Victoria.

== Education ==
Primary schools include Eltham Primary School which was established in Little Eltham in July 1855, Our Lady Help of Christians Primary, Eltham East Primary and Eltham North Primary School.

Eltham encompasses the state secondary school, Eltham High School, as well as a private girls secondary school, Catholic Ladies College, Eltham. Another private secondary school, Eltham College, takes its name from Eltham, but is located in nearby Research. There are various childcare and early learning centres available. Several schools are also located in the exclusive connecting area of Eltham North, including St. Helena Secondary College, Plenty Valley International Montessori School, Holy Trinity Primary School, Glen Katherine Primary School and near Eltham College there is Research Primary.

== Community groups ==
- 1st Eltham Scouts
- 2nd Eltham Sea Scouts
- Eltham Child Care Cooperative
- Eltham Community Action Group are active in the community and work to maintain Eltham's character.
- Eltham District Historical Society collects, preserves and share stories about the local history of the Eltham district.
- Eltham Toy Library provides an environment for children to learn, grow and play.
- Rotary Club of Eltham
- Welcome to Eltham supports refugees and people seeking asylum settling in Eltham.

== Notable residents ==
- Clem Christesen – Literary Editor
- Nina Christesen – Russian Academic
- Peter Hitchener – news reader
- Kerry Armstrong – actor
- Emily Browning – actor
- Tim Burstall – film director
- Emma Carney – Multiple World Champion Triathlete, Sport Australia Hall of Fame Member, World Triathlon Hall of Fame, Triathlon Australia Hall of Fame. Athletics Australia Member #700.
- Cadel Evans – cyclist
- Peter Helliar – comedian
- Phil Judd – musician and artist. Founder of Split Enz and The Swingers. Wrote the No. 1 hit "Counting The Beat"
- Alistair Knox – house builder and landscape architect
- Percy Leason – Political cartoonist and artist
- Greg Macainsh – musician and songwriter
- Alan Marshall – author
- Ben Mendelsohn – actor
- Peter Moore – Australian Rules Footballer
- Daisy Pearce – Australian rules footballer and coach
- Adam Simpson – former captain of the Kangaroos Australian rules football club
- Donald Thomson – anthropologist
- Terry Wallace – former AFL coach, Western Bulldogs
- Merrick Watts – comedian
- Wilbur Wilde – musician, television personality

== See also ==
- Shire of Diamond Valley – Parts of Eltham were previously within this former local government area.
- Shire of Eltham – Parts of Eltham were previously within this former local government area.
- Eltham copper, a subspecies of butterfly particular to, and named after Eltham
