= Plowman's Railroad =

Coordinates: 50.7798°N 1.8715°W

Plowman's Railroad operates the collection of 7 1/4 in (184 mm) gauge American outline steam and diesel locomotives from the former Dobwalls Adventure Park and is located at Plowmans Garden Nursery & Plant Centre Ltd, West Parley, Ferndown, Dorset. The rolling stock has since been sold and shipped to Australia and the railway is now run by the West Parley Miniature Engineering Society. This railway has now closed following the complete collapse of the Garden Centre.

== Locomotives & Rolling Stock ==
The locomotives from the Dobwall's Collection are as follows:

Live Steamer

Locomotive Detail	Name	Status	Image
Union Pacific 4-8-8-4 No. X4008	"William Jeffers"	Boiler ticket expired	
Union Pacific 4-8-2 No. 818	"Queen of Wyoming"	Running maintenance (rods)	
Union Pacific 4-8-2 No. 838	"Queen of Nebraska"	Available for operation	
Rio Grande 2-8-2 No. 498	"Otto Mears"	Available for operation	

Diesel

Locomotive Detail	Name	Status	Image
Union Pacific DDA40X Do-Do No.6908	"Centennial"	Available for operation	
Rio Grande GP35 Bo-Bo No.3008	"Mathias Baldwin"	Available for operation	
Santa Fe FP45 Co-Co No.5908	"Pioneer"	In for maintenance	
Amtrak E8 No. 248	"Spirit of America"	Available for operation	

Other Rolling Stock

There is a set of 'sit-astride' coaches, built to a high standard these are also part of the original Dobwall's collection.

== Railroad Tracks ==
Phase One of this railroad was a simple loop with a siding running to/ from the passenger station and storage tracks, trains start at the main station, run round the loop twice and then reverse back into the main station. There is approximately 2,000 feet (610 m) of track including 2 storage tracks.

The station - behind Plowman's Garden Centre, Christchurch Road, West Parley - is now of the "through" type, with a platform line, a bypass line and a storage siding. The main route is from the station into the large field behind the Plowman's Garden Centre plant polytunnels and back to the station through a short "tunnel". The usual journey takes the main route into the field, then a set of facing points diverts the train onto an internal loop past the polytunnels and back onto the main route. On the second circuit of the main route, the facing points are reset and the train runs through the "tunnel" and onto the station bypass line, then out onto the main route again. On the third circuit the train is brought back to the platform and the journey ends.

The railway normally operates running up to Christmas, in conjunction with the garden centre's Santa Claus visits for young children. Then at Bank Holidays from Easter (Easter Sunday excluded) to August Bank Holiday. And the last weekend of the months between Easter and the end of August.

Steam and petrol-hydraulic locos are used. Search on-line for West Parley Miniature Railway.

== See also ==
Ridable miniature railway

Dobwalls Adventure Park
