= Eltham railway station, Melbourne =

Railway station in Melbourne, Australia

Eltham
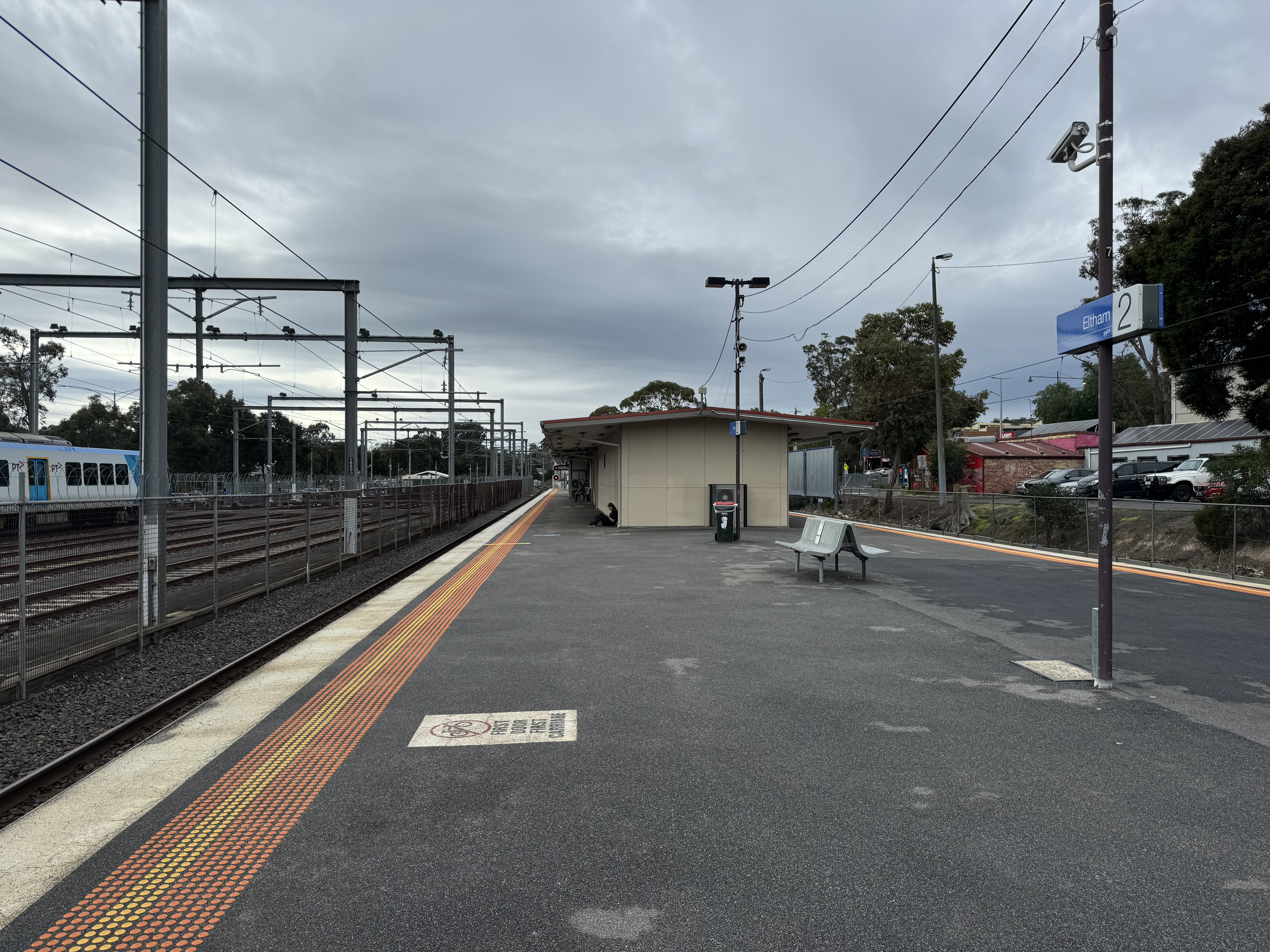
- Northbound view from Platform 2, August 2024

General information
- Location: Main Road, Eltham, Victoria 3095; Shire of Nillumbik; Australia
- Coordinates: 37°42′50″S 145°08′52″E
- System: PTV commuter rail station
- Owner: VicTrack
- Operator: Metro Trains
- Line: Hurstbridge
- Distance: 27.39 kilometres from Southern Cross
- Platforms: 2 (1 island)
- Tracks: 7
- Connections: Bus

Construction
- Structure type: Ground
- Parking: 355
- Cycle facilities: Yes
- Accessible: No — steep ramp

Other information
- Status: Operational, premium station
- Station code: ELT
- Fare zone: Myki zone 2
- Website: Public Transport Victoria

History
- Opened: 5 June 1902; 124 years ago
- Rebuilt: 1960; 2013
- Electrified: April 1923 (1500 V DC overhead)

Passengers
- 2005–2006: 663,742
- 2006–2007: 691,282 ▲4.14%
- 2007–2008: 760,060 ▲9.94%
- 2008–2009: 732,709 ▼3.59%
- 2009–2010: 733,477 ▲0.1%
- 2010–2011: 745,183 ▲1.59%
- 2011–2012: 713,724 ▼4.22%
- 2012–2013: Not measured
- 2013–2014: 575,948 ▼19.3%
- 2014–2015: 577,803 ▲0.32%
- 2015–2016: 626,376 ▲8.4%
- 2016–2017: 615,427 ▼1.74%
- 2017–2018: 532,168 ▼13.52%
- 2018–2019: 588,837 ▲10.64%
- 2019–2020: 461,400 ▼21.64%
- 2020–2021: 206,900 ▼55.15%
- 2021–2022: 250,100 ▲20.88%
- 2022–2023: 317,600 ▲26.63%
- 2023–2024: 387,550 ▲22.37%
- 2024–2025: 344,100 ▲11.21%

Services
Preceding station	Metro Trains	Following station
Montmorency towards Flinders Street	Hurstbridge line	Diamond Creek towards Hurstbridge
Montmorency towards Flinders Street	Hurstbridge line	Terminus
Track layout
Location

Eltham station is a railway station operated by Metro Trains Melbourne on the Hurstbridge line, part of the Melbourne rail network. It serves the north-eastern suburb of Eltham, in Melbourne, Victoria, Australia. Eltham station is a ground level premium station, featuring an island platform. It opened on 5 June 1902, with the current platforms provided in 1960 and the upgrades in 2013.

Eltham is the terminus for half of all services on the line. Five stabling sidings are located to the west of Platform 2, with the site previously having been a goods yard. The last timber trestle bridge on the Melbourne suburban network is located to the south of the station.

== History ==
Eltham station opened on 5 June 1902, when the railway line from Heidelberg was extended. It remained a terminus until June 1912, when the line was extended to Hurstbridge. Like the suburb itself, the station is named after the district of Eltham in Kent, England.

In 1960, Platform 1 was converted from a south-facing bay platform to a through platform, with a connection to the main line provided at the down end of the station. Also in that year, the current station building was provided. In 1969, flashing light signals were provided at the Diamond Street level crossing, located nearby in the down direction from the station.

In 1977, a ramped goods platform was abolished, with a goods shed believed to be demolished around the same time. By 1984, goods traffic to and from the station ceased. In 1987, boom barriers were provided at the Diamond Street level crossing.

On 4 July 1996, Eltham was upgraded to a premium station. A minor refurbishment of the station also occurred during this time.

On 25 December 2011, following a large storm and subsequent flooding, parts of the line at the down end of the level crossing were washed away. The flooding also eroded a culvert, exposing a small timber bridge.

Eltham was one of the last stations in Melbourne to be controlled by mechanical safeworking, including the use of semaphore signals. It was also a break between two different types of safeworking: Greensborough to Eltham was controlled by miniature electric staff, whilst Eltham to Hurstbridge was controlled by train staff and ticket. Both safeworking systems were converted to Automatic Track Control (ATC) in early 2013. A new amenities building for train drivers was constructed around that time, as well as an upgrade to the stabling sidings.

On 15 May 2019, the Level Crossing Removal Project announced that planning for the duplication of 3 km of track between Eltham and Greensborough was underway, with early works began in 2021, with major construction started in 2022. The project scope had to be amended after it was discovered that the new track would destroy habitat of the endangered eltham copper butterfly. The Eltham Trestle Bridge would not be affected by the project. The reduced scope project with line duplication only provided between greesbourgh and montmorency was completed in 2023.

== Platforms and services ==
Eltham has one island platform with two faces. Trains in either direction can depart from either platform, although Hurstbridge bound services almost always depart from Platform 1, and Flinders Street bound services usually depart from Platform 2.

It is served by Hurstbridge line trains.

Eltham platform arrangement
Platform	Line	Destination	Service Type	Notes	Source
1	Hurstbridge line	Hurstbridge, Flinders Street	All stations and limited express services	Services to Hurstbridge will normally depart from this platform.	
2	Hurstbridge line	Hurstbridge, Flinders Street	All stations and limited express services	Services to Flinders Street will normally depart from this platform.	

== Transport links ==
Kinetic Melbourne operates seven routes via Eltham station, under contract to Transport Victoria:

- 513 : to Glenroy station (via Lower Plenty)
- 514 : to Glenroy station (via Greensborough)
- 578 : to Warrandyte
- 579 : to Warrandyte
- 580 : to Diamond Creek
- 582 : to Eltham station (Eltham Town Service)
- SmartBus 902 : Chelsea station – Westfield Airport West

== Gallery ==
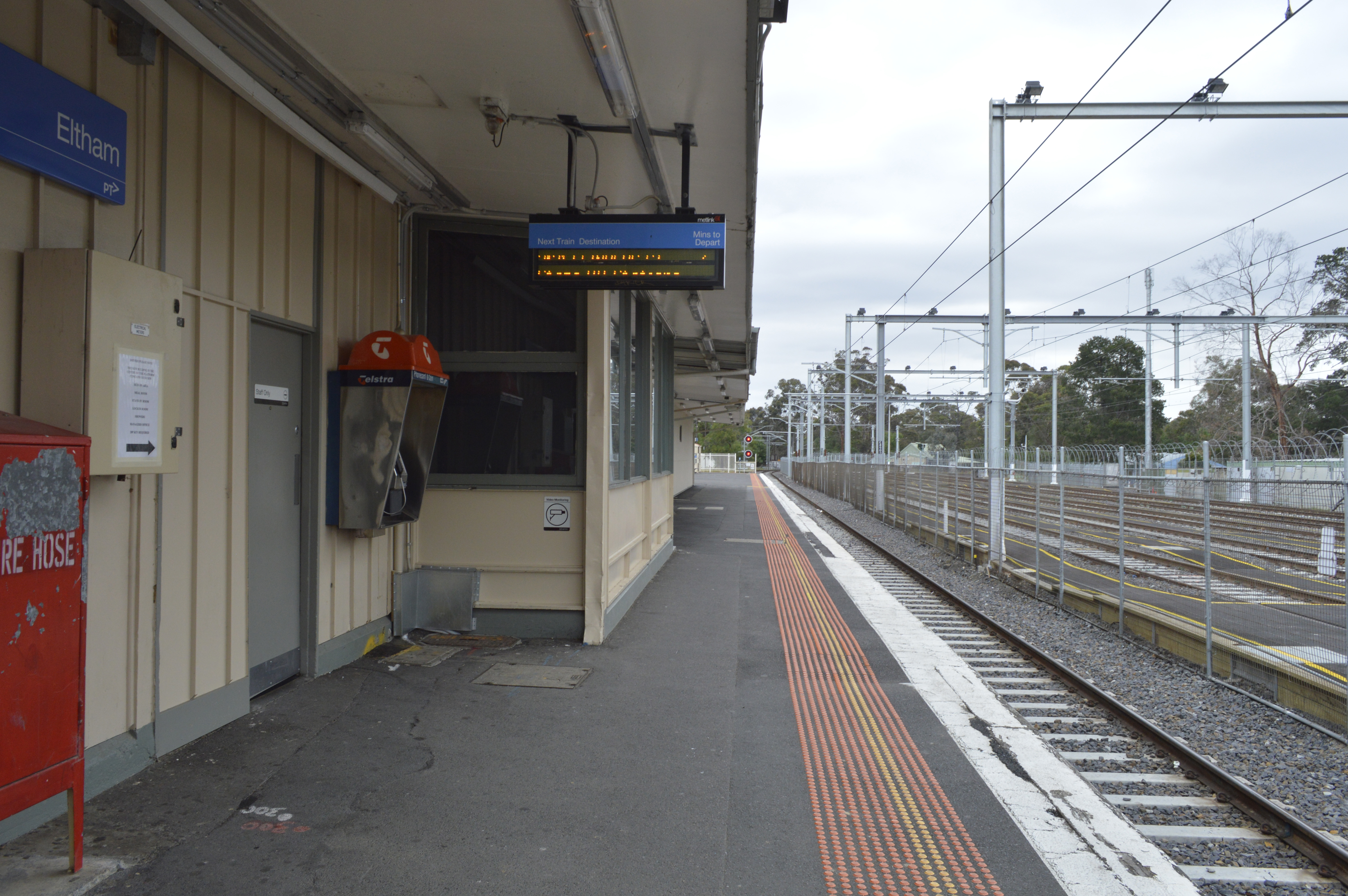
Southbound view from Platform 2,
November 2013

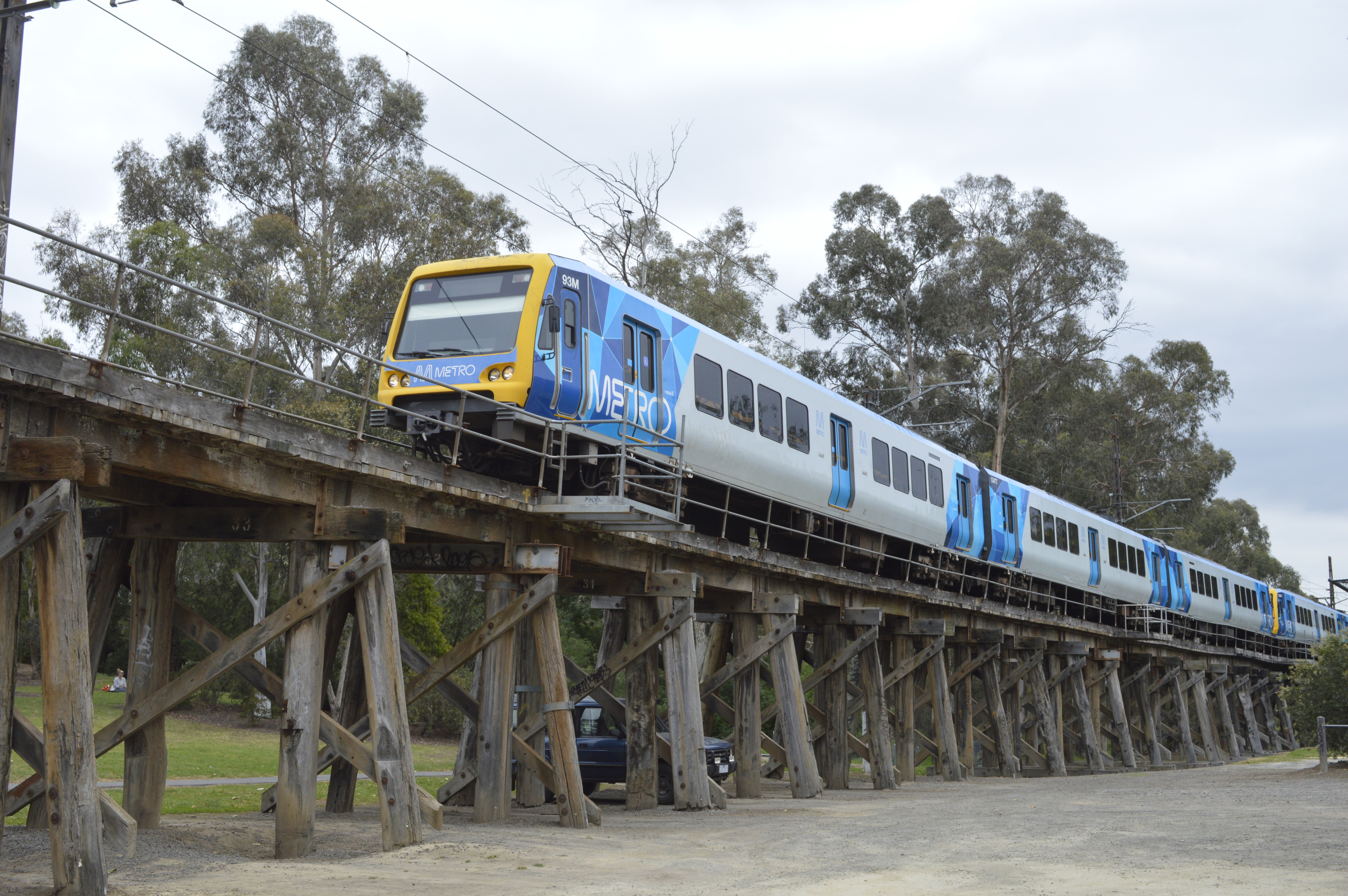
A Metro X'Trapolis train crosses the trestle bridge, November 2013

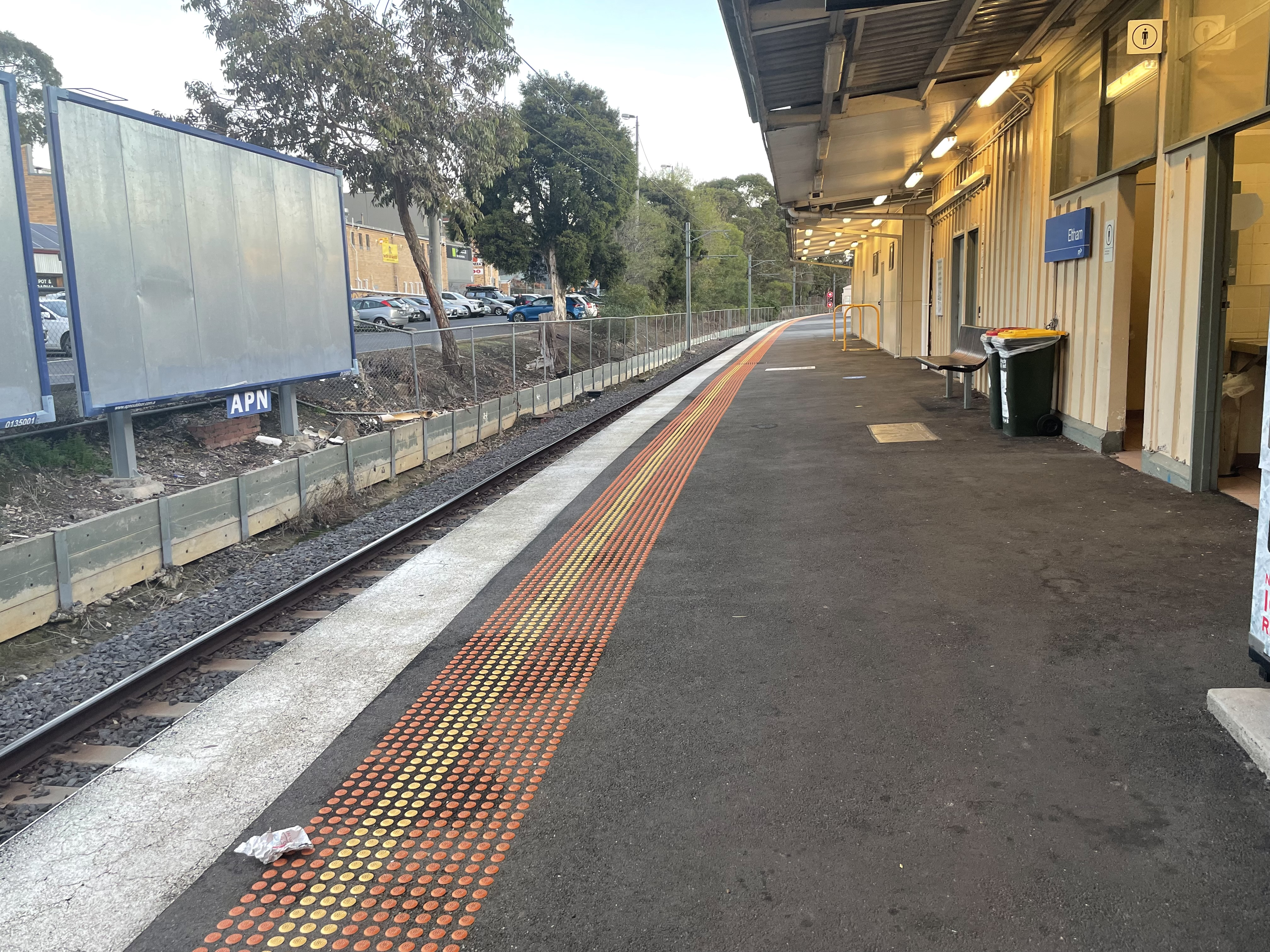
Southbound view from Platform 1, June 2024

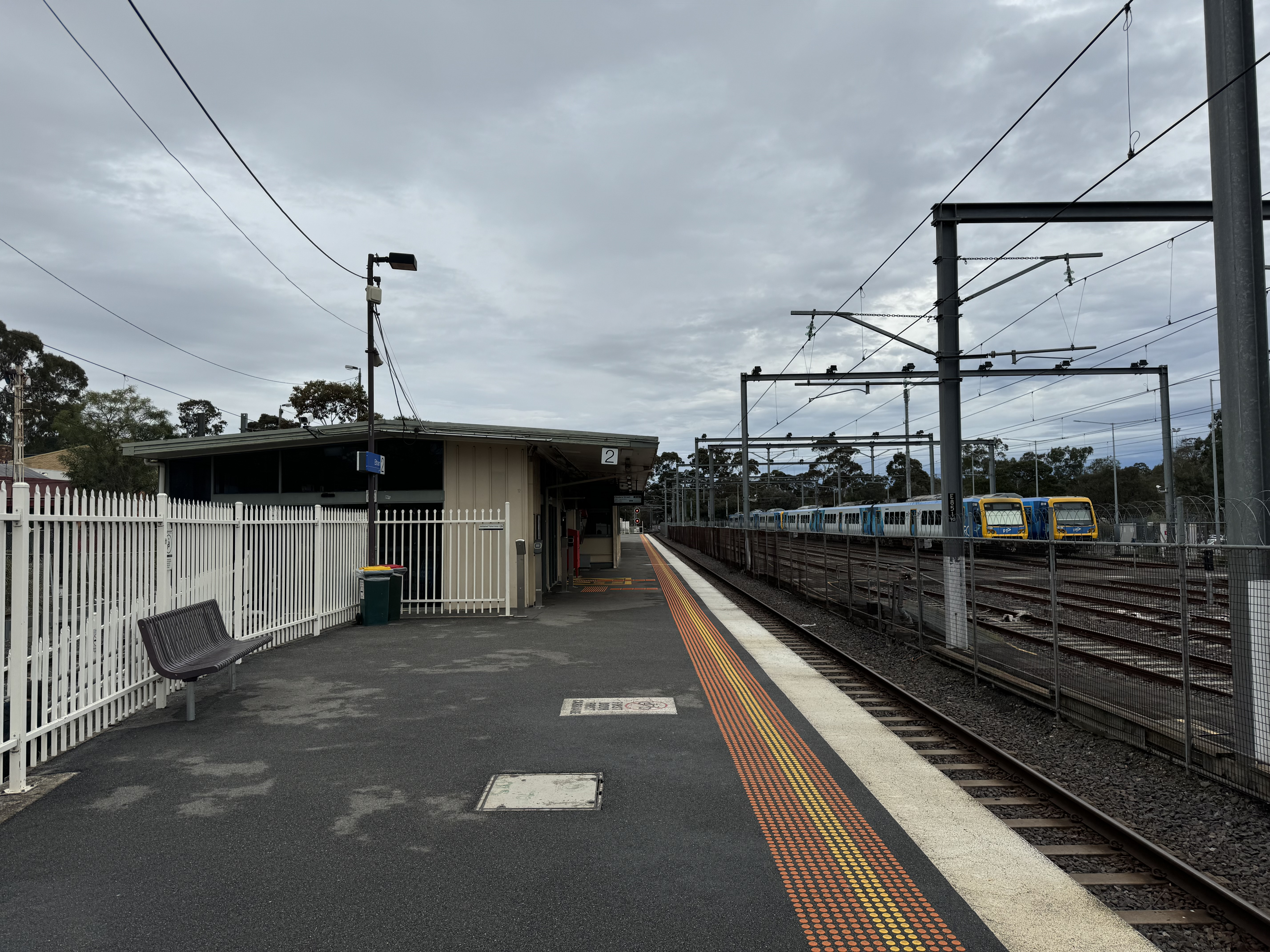
Southbound view from Platform 2, with two X'Trapolis trains seen sitting in the station sidings, August 2024

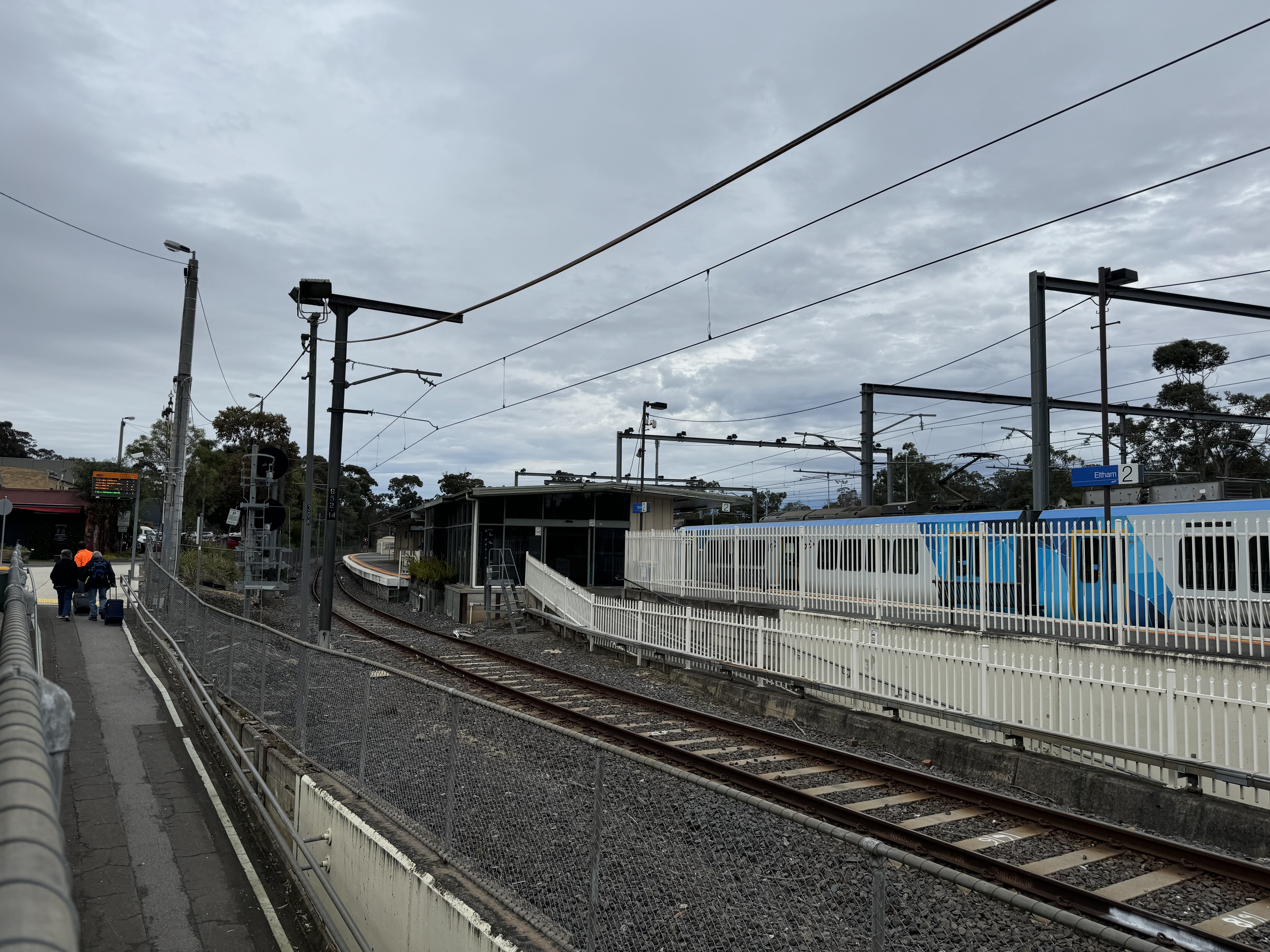
Southbound view of the station platforms,
August 2024
