= Diamond Valley Railway =

Overview
- Status: Operating
- Locale: 570 Main Road, Eltham, Victoria
- Coordinates: 37.7335°S 145.1419°E

Service
- Type: Ridable miniature railway
- Services: 1
- Operator: Diamond Valley Railway Inc.

History
- Opened: 1961

Technical
- Line length: 1.95 km (1.21 mi)
- Track length: 4.26 km (2.65 mi)
- Track gauge: 7 1/4 in (184 mm)
- Operating speed: Max 15 km/h

The Diamond Valley Railway is a 7 1/4 inch ridable miniature railway located at Eltham Lower Park, Eltham, Victoria (a suburb of Melbourne, Australia). The railway operates a variety of live steam, battery electric and petrol/diesel powered locomotives. It is run by volunteers and operates on every Sunday of the year, most public holidays and on Wednesdays during school holidays. The fare is $5 per person (under 2 free). One complete mainline journey takes about 12 to 15 minutes. It is a popular tourist attraction and carries approximately 150,000 passengers a year.

== History ==
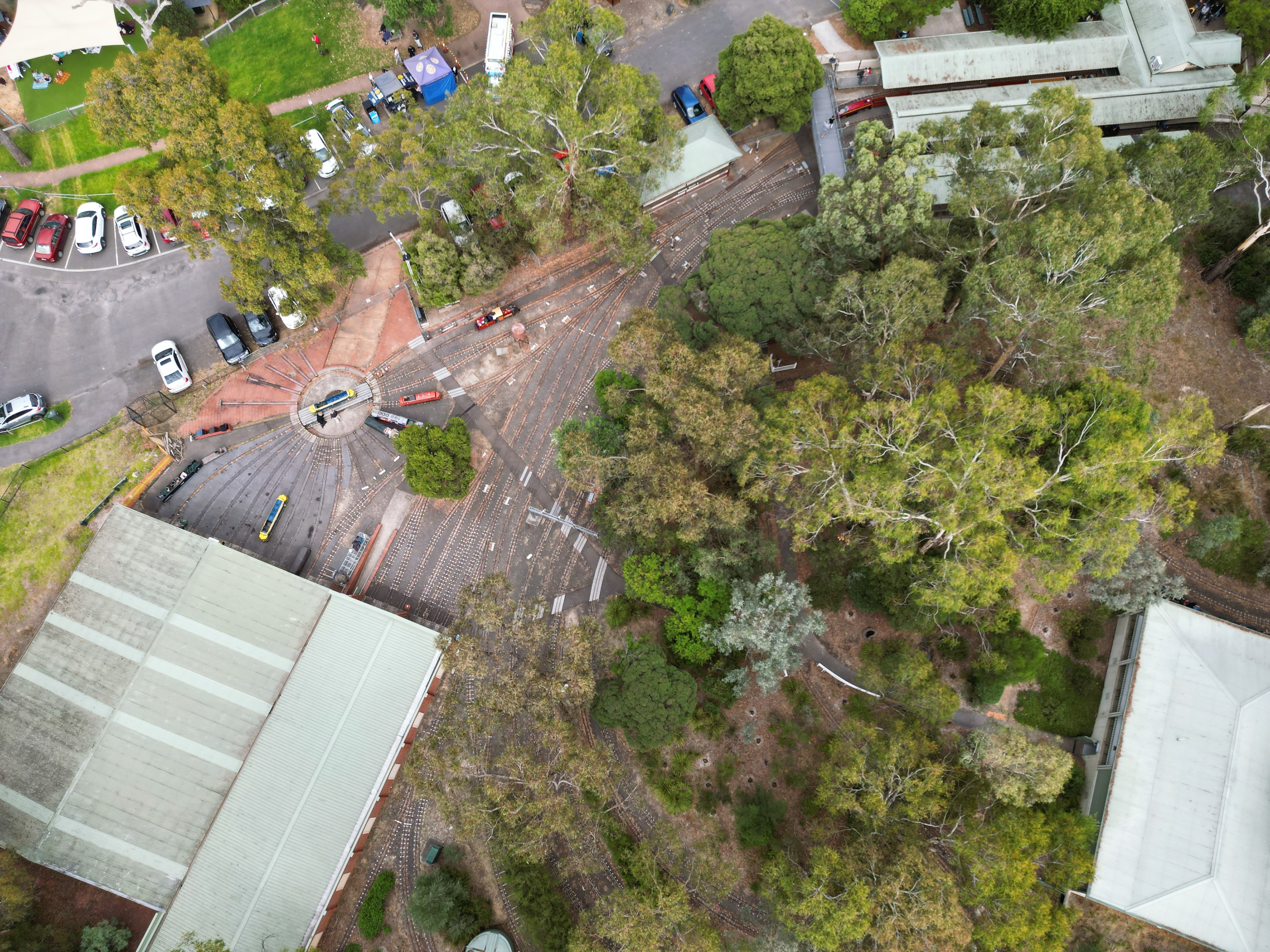
Aerial perspective of the Diamond Valley Railway. March 2023.

The Diamond Valley Miniature Railway Club was founded in 1960 with equipment relocated from the closed Chelsworth Park Railway (located in Ivanhoe, Melbourne). The original mainline at Eltham was completed on 17 August 1961, at 0.52 km (0.32 miles) long. Numerous developments, extensions and improvements took place in the years that followed. Importantly, starting the in mid-1960s, the original 1" x 1/2" steel 'rail' was replaced with 14 lb/yard rail recovered from disused quarries, railways and tramways. From 2001 the mainline was progressively relaid with 6 kg/m (12 lb/yd) flat bottomed Japanese rail.)

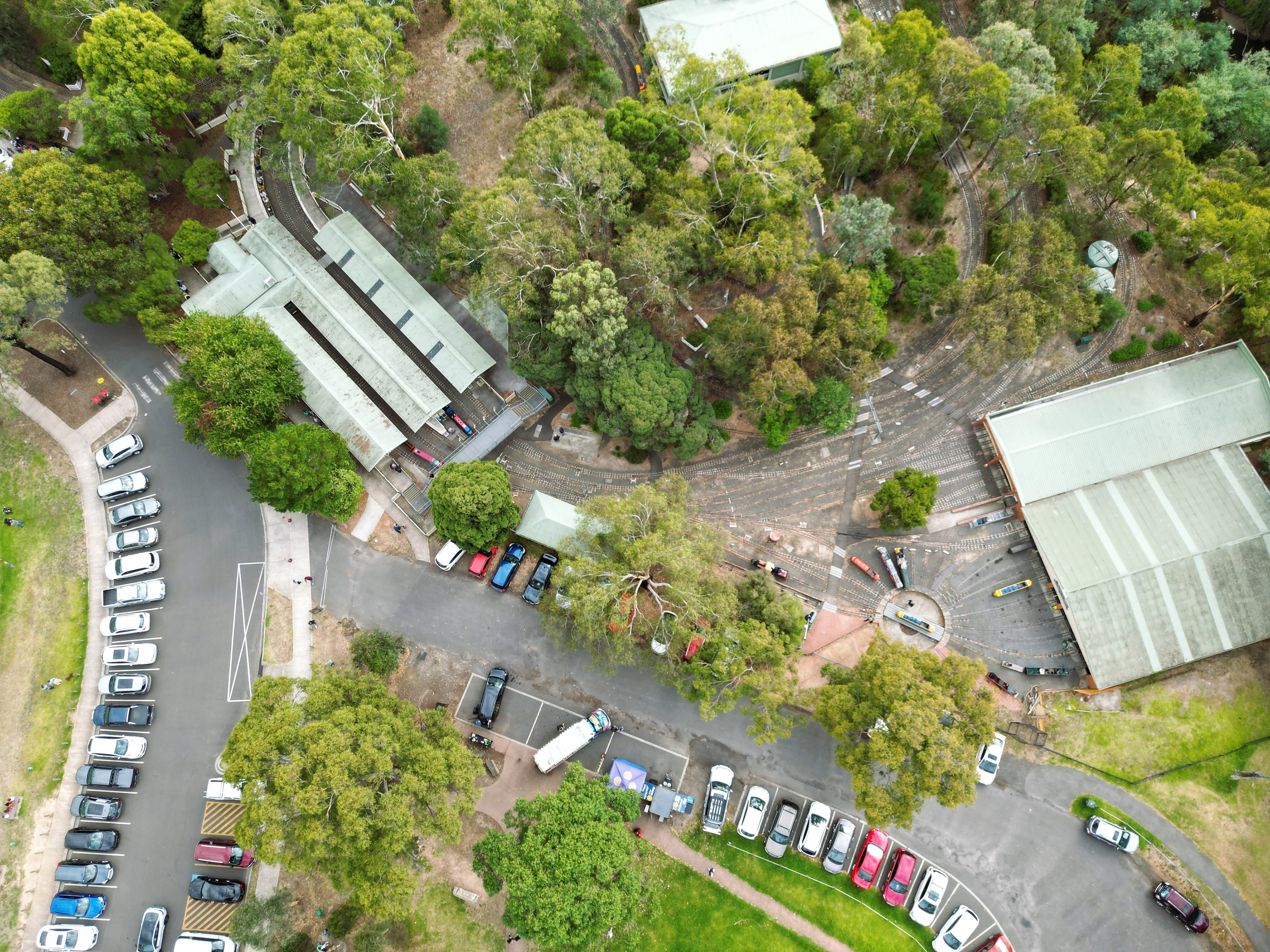
Aerial perspective of the parking lots at Diamond Valley Miniature Railway. March 2023.

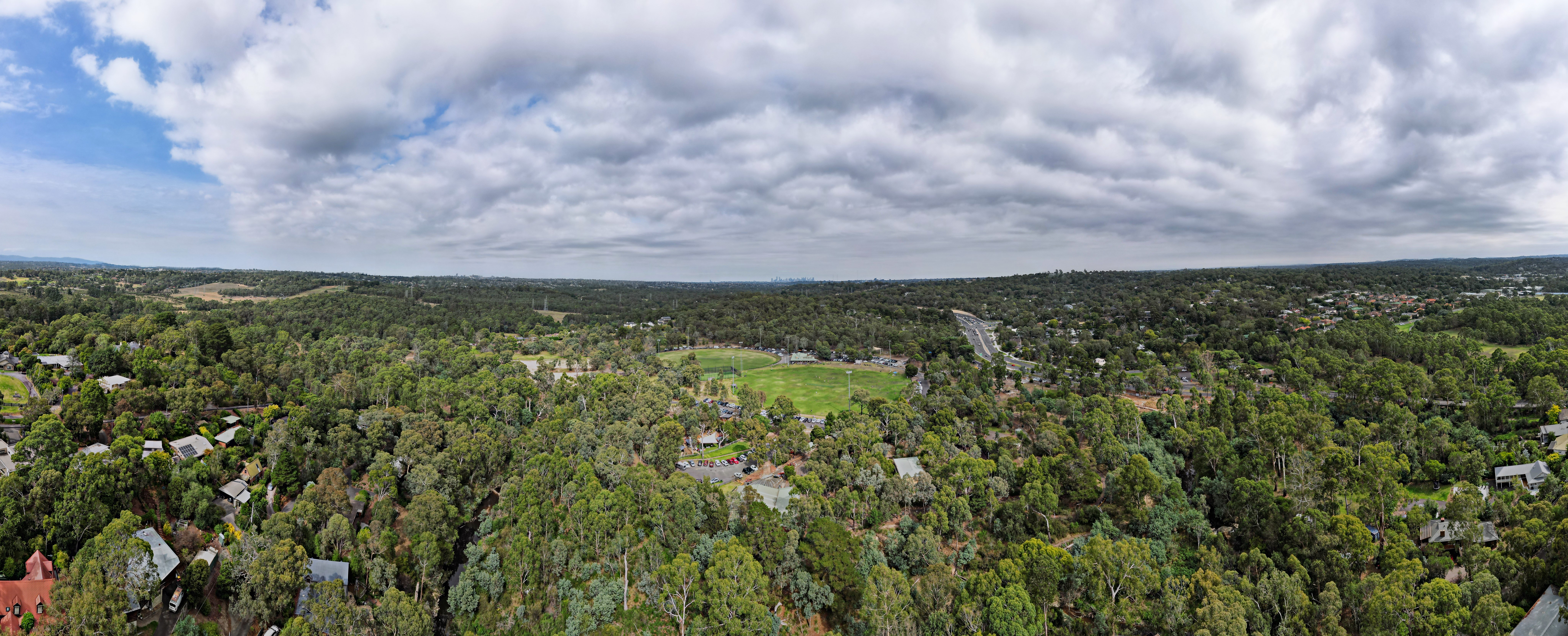
Aerial panorama of Eltham's Diamond Valley Railway and its surrounds. March 2023.

The mainline was significantly expanded in the 1980s to extend down to the edge of the Eltham Lower Park, (called the outer circle) within sight of Main Road and passing motor traffic. The "Pine Creek Platform" adjacent to the road only operates for special charters. The full mainline is now 1.92 km (1.21 mi) long and takes about 12 minutes to complete a journey, passing through two tunnels and over a number of bridges. The line runs over, under and besides itself in a twisted and folded loop. There are the equivalent of 111 points and crossings in the trackwork.

In the 10 years after it opened the railway carried 250,000 passengers. By 12 June 2011, after almost 50 years of operation, it had carried 3,000,000 passengers.

In March 1974 the Club was dissolved and all assets were taken over by Diamond Valley Railway Limited with members of the club transferring to the new organisation.

In 2015, Diamond Valley Railway applied to open a second circuit to the south of the current track. The circuit is to be called Yarra Landing Circuit. This fell through in 2024 with the announcement a dog park would be built in the land targeted by the extension.

== Operation ==
The railway uses operating procedures based Victorian Railways prototypes both semaphore and search light signalling. (All signals are 1/4 of full size). Up to twelve trains can be running at any one time on the mainline.

The "B" signal box near Diamond Valley Station has a miniature lever frame with 80 levers for controlling train movements in the vicinity, and are operated using PLCs. (All buildings 1/2 full size).

The Railway owns fourteen (16) locomotives and over 80 items of rollingstock:

- four live-steam
- ten diesel/petrol using hydraulic/electric/mechanical drive
- two electric multiple unit (EMU) sets.

Also a number of privately owned locomotives operate on the line.

Most rolling stock is 1/6 of full size. Live steam locomotives cannot be used on days of total fire ban.

The Railway has carried over 4 million passengers and usually gets over 2,000 passengers each Sunday.

== Timetable ==
Running times are as follows:

- Almost every Sunday from 11:00am to 5:00pm
- Most public holidays from 1:00pm to 4:00pm
- During Victorian school holidays (except in December) on Wednesdays from 1:00pm to 4:00pm.
- Services are run as a "turn-up and go" railway.

^ the railway does not run on Christmas Day, Labour Day (Victoria), Melbourne Cup Day or substitute public holidays except Australia Day.

Special events timetabling, such as night running (usually in March each year), are also scheduled and private bookings can be made.

== In popular culture ==
In the Australian movie 'I Love You Too (2010)' the lead male character is a full-time train driver at an unnamed miniature railway; the scenes with him at work and the finale were filmed at the Diamond Valley Railway.
