= City of Glen Eira =

Coordinates: 37°44′S 145°03′E

- Local government area
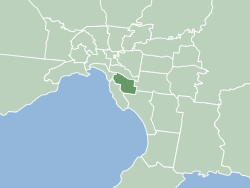

- Interactive map of City of Glen Eira
- Country: Australia
- State: Victoria
- Region: Greater Melbourne
- Established: 1994
- Council seat: Caulfield

Government
  - Mayor: Cr Li Zhang
  - State electorates: Bentleigh; Caulfield; Oakleigh
  - Federal divisions: Goldstein; Hotham; Macnamara

Area
  - Total: 39 km^{2} (15 sq mi)

Population
  - Total: 153,858 (2018) (50th)
  - Density: 3,950/km^{2} (10,220/sq mi)
- Website: City of Glen Eira
LGAs around City of Glen Eira
Port Phillip	Stonnington	Monash
Port Phillip	City of Glen Eira	Monash
Bayside	Kingston	Kingston

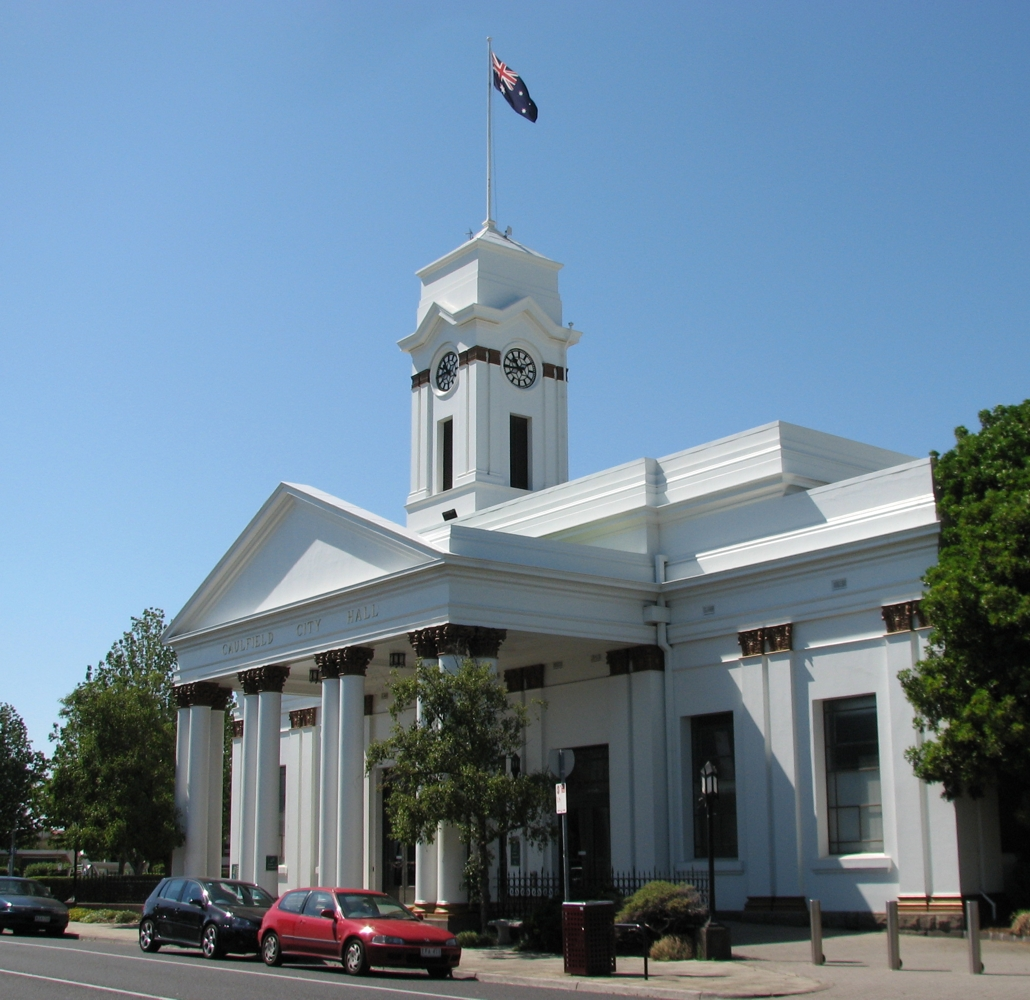
Glen Eira Town Hall in Caulfield

The City of Glen Eira is a local government area in Victoria, Australia. It is located in the south-eastern suburbs of Melbourne. It has an area of 39 square kilometres (15.06 sq mi) and has an estimated population of 153,858 (51.6% female and 48.4% male).

The local government area was formed in 1994 from the merger of the City of Caulfield and parts of the City of Moorabbin, and takes its name from two local landmarks—Glen Eira Road and Glen Eira Mansion. The local government area was originally planned to be named "City of Gardiner" from the merger of City of Caulfield and parts of the City of Malvern.

== History ==
This area was originally occupied by the Boonwurrung/Bunurong and Wurundjeri Woi Wurrung peoples, Indigenous Australians of the Eastern Kulin nation, who spoke variations of the Boonwurrung and Woiwurrung language groups respectively.

=== Settlement ===
East St Kilda commenced to be settled in the 1850s. The area of Glen Eira was once swamps.

Caulfield became a Shire in 1871 and a City in 1913; Moorabbin became a Shire in 1874 and a City in 1934.

The first railway link to the area was at Caulfield and Carnegie railway stations, which opened in 1879, to be followed in 1881 by Glen Huntly and Ormond railway stations.

- 1857 Caulfield Road District
- 1862 Moorabbin Road District
- 1863 Shire of Caulfield
- 1874 Shire of Moorabbin
- 1913 City of Caulfield
- 1934 City of Moorabbin
- 1994 City of Glen Eira, by merging of Caulfield and north Moorabbin

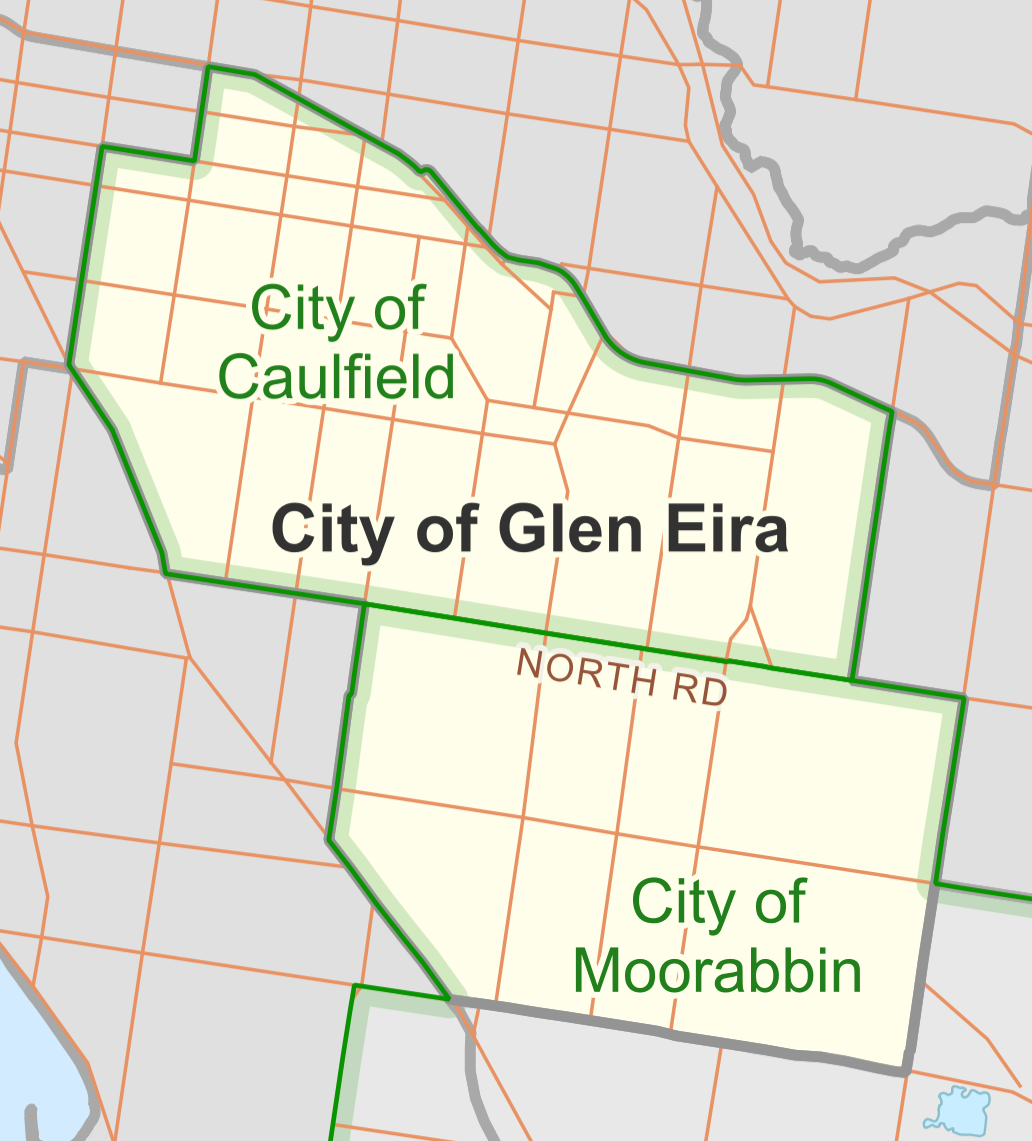
The City of Glen Eira's predecessor LGAs (green) as they were in 1994

=== Train network ===
Caulfield railway station originally opened on 7 May 1879.

Glen Huntly railway station opened on 19 December 1881 as Glen Huntly Road. It was later renamed to Glen Huntly in 1882 before being renamed Glenhuntly in 1937 and then back to Glen Huntly in 2023.

Ormond railway station opened on 19 December 1881 as North Road. It was later renamed to Ormond in 1897.

Carnegie railway station opened on 14 May 1879 as Rosstown. It was later renamed to Carnegie in 1909.

=== Monash University, Caulfield Campus ===
Monash University, Caulfield campus was founded as the Caulfield Technical School in 1922. A Junior Technical High School was added in the 1950s, with the Technical School becoming a Senior Technical High School. They separated in 1958 with the junior school absorbed by other technical schools in the area and the senior school became Caulfield Technical College. In the 1970s it became the Caulfield Institute of Technology. In 1982 the Caulfield Institute of Technology amalgamated with the State College of Victoria at Frankston to form the Chisholm Institute of Technology. This Institution merged with Monash University in 1990 and became Monash University, Caulfield campus.

=== Sacking of Council, 2004 ===
In September 2004, the then Minister for Local Government, Candy Broad, was asked to appoint an inspector by the Glen Eira City Council to investigate and report on matters arising out of an internal audit of councillors' expenses. In July 2005, the Inspector of Municipal Administration, Merv Whelan, forwarded a report to the Minister. The key findings portrayed a complete breakdown of communication and behavioural standards within the elected council, although Whelan found the council was well-managed and in a sound financial position because of its CEO and administration. A report in The Age newspaper alleged that several councillors had used their phone entitlements for non-council purposes.

On 11 August 2005, the then Minister sacked the council, and appointed John Lester, the former Chief Commissioner of Darebin City Council and former chair of the Victorian Grants Commission, as Administrator. An election for a new council was held on 26 November 2005 with redrawn ward boundaries. Only one councillor from the previous council, Margaret Esakoff, was re-elected. Three other sacked councillors (Noel Erlich, Veronika Martens and Bob Bury) did run again but failed to get elected into council.

=== Carbon neutral ===
Controversially, in 2009 the City of Glen Eira was one of the few regions in the Melbourne metropolitan area to make the decision not to become carbon neutral, despite most LGA's in Melbourne converting to a cleaner energy contract.

In 2020, Glen passed a motion to declare a climate emergency, and committed to net zero Council carbon emissions by 2025.

== Townships and localities ==
The city had a population of 148,908 at the 2021 census, up from 140,875 at the 2016 census.

Population
Locality	2016	2021
Bentleigh	16,153	17,921
Bentleigh East	27,635	30,159
Brighton East^	15,998	16,757
Carnegie	17,388	17,909
Caulfield	5,595	5,748
Caulfield East	1,584	1,293
Caulfield North	15,269	16,903
Caulfield South	11,854	12,328
Elsternwick	10,349	10,887
Gardenvale	1,006	1,019
Glen Huntly	5,040	4,905
McKinnon	6,064	6,878
Murrumbeena	9,926	9,996
Ormond	8,417	8,328
St Kilda East^	13,101	12,571

^ - Territory divided with another LGA

== Demographics ==
=== Ages ===
The median age for Glen Eira residents is 37 years. Children 0–14 years make up 18.0% of the population, 15 to 19 years 5.4%, 20 to 64 61.9% and those 65 years and over 14.7%.

=== Registered marital status ===
Of people in Glen Eira aged 15 years and over, 49.6% are married, 35.1% have never married and 9.1% are divorced or separated.

=== Country of birth ===
The country of birth for City of Glen Eira residents includes Australia 60.3%, India 3.8%, China 3.2%, England 2.8%, South Africa 2.3% and Greece 1.7%.

=== Religion ===
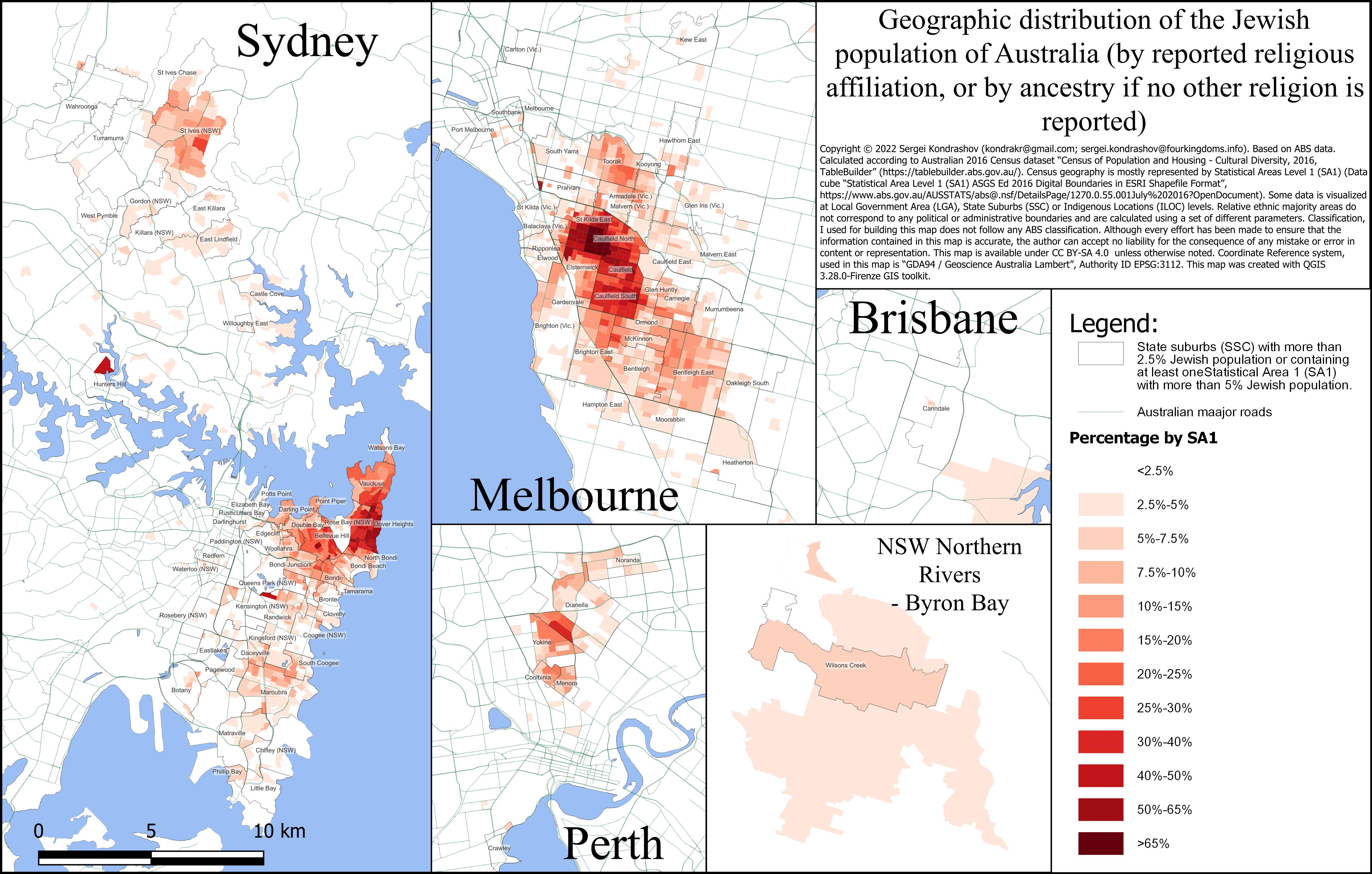
Geographic distribution of the Jewish population of Australia (by reported religious affiliation, or by ancestry if no other religion is reported), by Statistical Areas 1 (SA1)

The City of Glen Eira includes a large Jewish community in Elsternwick, St Kilda East and Caulfield. At the 2011 Census 54.9% of all Victorians who gave Judaism as their religion were living in Glen Eira. The major responses were No Religion 22.9%, Catholicism 20.1%, Judaism 18.9%, Anglican 8.4% and Eastern Orthodox 6.6%.

== Council ==
Glen Eira City Council is the third tier of government and deals with services such as waste collection, building permits and approvals, roads, drainage, health services, food safety, parks and gardens, library services, pets, street parking permits and the collection of rates and charges. The Council meets at the Glen Eira Town Hall. Since 2024, the Council area is divided into nine wards, each electing a single councillor. The most recent election took place on 26 October 2024 and saw the following councillors elected:

Ward	Party	Councillor	Notes
Bambra	Independent	Margaret Esakoff	
Booran	Independent Labor	Jane Karslake	
Caulfield Park	Independent	Sam Parasol	
Jasper	Independent	Arabella Daniel	
Mallanbool	Independent	Kimberley Young	
Moorleigh	Independent	Kay Rimbaldo	
Murrumbeena	Independent Labor	Luca Ragni	
Orrong	Independent	Simone Zmood	Mayor
Wattle Grove	Independent Labor	Li Zhang	Deputy Mayor

== Election results ==
=== 2024 ===
2024 Victorian local elections: Glen Eira
Party	Votes	%	Swing	Seats	Change
Independent	57,980	68.75	+15.39	6	▲1
Independent Labor	16,205	19.78	+0.97	3	Steady
Greens	4,253	5.19	–3.77	0	▼1
Independent Liberal	1,647	2.01	–11.56	0	Steady
Libertarian	1,060	1.29	+0.67	0	Steady
Victorian Socialists	785	0.96	+0.96	0	Steady
Formal votes	81,930	97.15	+2.31		
Informal votes	2,407	2.85	–2.31		
Total	84,337	100.00		9	Steady
Registered voters / turnout	102,201	82.52	–0.66		

=== 2020 ===
2020 Victorian local elections: Glen Eira
Party	Votes	%	Seats	Change
Independent	42,373	53.36	5	▲2
Independent Labor	16,474	18.81	3	Steady
Independent Liberal	10,772	13.57	0	▼3
Greens	7,846	8.96	1	Steady
Reason	1,390	1.58	0	Steady
Liberal Democrats	549	0.62	0	Steady
Turnout	87,531	90.67		

== Past councillors ==
=== 1997–2005 (three wards; preferential voting) ===
==== Jasper Ward ====
Year
Year	Councillor	Party	Councillor	Party	Councillor	Party
1997	Barry Neve	Independent	Russell Longmuir	Independent	2 councillors (1997−2000)	
2000	David Bloom	Independent	Rachelle Sapir	Independent	Eamonn Walsh	Independent
2003	Jamie Hyams	Independent	Bob Bury	Independent	Margaret Esakoff	Independent

==== Mackie Ward ====
Year
Year	Councillor	Party	Councillor	Party	Councillor	Party
1997	Veronika Martens	Independent	Norman Kennedy	Independent	2 councillors (1997−2000)	
2000	Veronika Martens	Independent	Norman Kennedy	Independent	Rachelle Sapir	Independent
2003	Veronika Martens	Independent	Dorothy Marwick	Independent	Rachelle Sapir	Independent

==== Orrong Ward ====
Year
Year	Councillor	Party	Councillor	Party	Councillor	Party
1997	Alan Grossbard	Independent	Noel Erlich	Independent	2 councillors (1997−2000)	
2000	Alan Grossbard	Independent	Noel Erlich	Independent	Dorothy Marwick	Independent
2003	Alan Grossbard	Independent	Noel Erlich	Independent	Dorothy Marwick	Independent

=== 2005–2024 (three wards; proportional representation) ===
==== Camden Ward ====
Year
Year	Councillor	Party	Councillor	Party	Councillor	Party
2005	Michael Lipshutz	Independent Liberal	Helen Whiteside	Liberal	Jacquie Robilliard	Independent
2008	Michael Lipshutz	Independent Liberal	Helen Whiteside	Liberal	Frank Penhalluriack	Independent
2010	Michael Lipshutz	Independent Liberal	Cheryl Forge	Independent	Frank Penhalluriack	Independent
2012	Michael Lipshutz	Independent Liberal	Mary Delahunty	Labor	Thomas Sounness	Greens
2016	Joel Silver	Liberal	Mary Delahunty	Labor	Dan Sztrajt	Independent
2020	Sam Parasol	Independent	Simone Zmood	Independent	David Zyngier	Greens
2024	Sam Parasol	Independent	Simone Zmood	Independent	Jane Karslake	Labor

==== Rosstown Ward ====
Year
Year	Councillor	Party	Councillor	Party	Councillor	Party
2005	Margaret Esakoff	Independent	Steven Tang	Independent	Rob Spaulding	Independent
2008	Margaret Esakoff	Independent	Steven Tang	Independent	Neil Piling	Independent
2012	Margaret Esakoff	Independent	Karina Okotel	Liberal	Neil Piling	Independent
2016	Margaret Esakoff	Independent	Kelvin Ho	Liberal	Neil Piling	Independent
2016	Margaret Esakoff	Independent	Tony Athanasopoulos	Independent Labor	Clare Davey	Greens
2020	Margaret Esakoff	Independent	Tony Athanasopoulos	Independent Labor	Neil Piling	Independent
2022	Margaret Esakoff	Independent	Tony Athanasopoulos	Independent Labor	Sue Pennicuik	Greens

==== Tucker Ward ====
Year
Year	Councillor	Party	Councillor	Party	Councillor	Party
2005	David Feldman	Independent	Nick Staikos	Labor	Kate Ashmor	Independent
2008	Henry Buch	Independent	Nick Staikos	Labor	Kate Ashmor	Independent
2008	Jamie Hyams	Liberal	Nick Staikos	Labor	Jim Magee	Labor
2009	Jamie Hyams	Liberal	Oscar Lobo	Labor	Jim Magee	Labor
2012	Jamie Hyams	Liberal	Oscar Lobo	Labor	Jim Magee	Labor
2016	Jamie Hyams	Liberal	Nina Taylor	Labor	Jim Magee	Labor
2018	Jamie Hyams	Liberal	Anne-Marie Cade	Independent	Jim Magee	Labor
2020	Li Zhang	Labor	Anne-Marie Cade	Independent	Jim Magee	Labor

== Government ==
The Goldstein, Higgins, Hotham and Macnamara divisions of the Australian House of Representatives, and the Bentleigh, Caulfield and Oakleigh state electoral districts of the Victorian Legislative Assembly, are partly in the City of Glen Eira. The council area is within the Southern Metropolitan Region for the Victorian Legislative Council.

== Public transport ==
Glen Eira is well-served by an efficient network of public transport in a mix of trams, trains and buses.

=== Train lines and stations ===
Glen Eira is served by 3 train lines. These are the:

- Frankston Line
- Pakenham/Cranbourne Lines
- Sandringham Line

The Frankston line is served by: Caulfield (Zone 1), Glenhuntly (Zone 1), Ormond (Zone 1 & 2), McKinnon (Zone 1 & 2), Bentleigh (Zone 1 & 2) and then by Patterson (Zone 2).

The Pakenham/Cranbourne lines are both served by:Caulfield (Zone 1), Carnegie (Zone 1) and then by Murrumbeena Railway Station (Zone 1).

The Sandringham Line is served by: Elsternwick (Zone 1).

=== Tram routes ===
- Route 3 - Malvern East to Melbourne University which travels along Waverley Road, Balaclava Road, Carlisle Street before proceeding along St Kilda Road into the central business district
- Route 16 - Kew to St Kilda and Melbourne University which travels along Glenferrie Road, Hawthorn Road and Balaclava Road, Carlisle Street, The Esplanade, Fitzroy Street before proceeding along St Kilda Road into the central business district
- Route 64 - Brighton East to Melbourne University which runs along Hawthorn Road and Dandenong Road, before proceeding along St Kilda Road into the central business district
- Route 67 - Carnegie to Melbourne University which runs along Glen Huntly Road and Brighton Road, before proceeding along St Kilda Road into the central business district

== Schools in the City of Glen Eira ==
=== Government ===
- East Bentleigh Primary School
- Tucker Road Bentleigh Primary School
- Bentleigh Secondary College
- St Peters Primary School
- Coatesville Primary School
- Bentleigh West Primary School
- Valkstone Primary School
- Glen Eira College
- Caulfield South Primary School
- Caulfield Primary School
- Caulfield Park Community Secondary School
- Caulfield Junior College
- Glen Huntly Primary School
- Carnegie Primary School
- Ripponlea Primary School
- McKinnon Secondary College
- McKinnon Primary School
- Murrembeena Primary School
- Ormond Primary School

=== Private ===
- Adass Israel School
- Beth Rivkah College
- Caulfield Grammar Senior School
- Katandra School
- Kilvington Grammar School
- Leibler Yavneh College
- Melbourne Grammar School - Grimwade House
- Mount Scopus Memorial College - St Kilda East Campus
- Our Lady of Sacred Heart College
- Wesley College - Elsternwick Campus
- St. Aloysius Catholic Primary School
- St. Anthony's Catholic Primary School
- St. Bede's Bentleigh East Catholic College
- St. Joseph's School
- St. Kevin's Catholic Primary School
- St. Patrick's Catholic Primary School
- St. Paul's Catholic Primary School
- Shelford Girls' Grammar
- Sholem Aleichem College
- Yeshivah College

== Libraries and information ==
The city is served by free council run libraries. Library membership is free.

=== Council public library branches ===
- Bentleigh - 161 Jasper Road, Bentleigh
- Carnegie - a large suburban library and civic centre, which was built in 2005 - 7 Shepparson Avenue, Carnegie
- Caulfield - at the City Hall, Corner Glen Eira and Hawthorn Roads, Caulfield
- Elsternwick - 4 Staniland Grove, Elsternwick

=== Private libraries open to the public ===
- Kadimah Jewish Cultural Centre and National Library - 7 Selwyn St, Elsternwick
- Makor Jewish Community Library- 306 Hawthorn Rd, Caulfield

== Sister cities ==
- Ōgaki, Gifu Prefecture, Japan
