= Milad El-Halabi =

Former Australian politician

Councillor of the City of Moreland for North-West Ward
- In office 17 November 2020 – 10 February 2022
- Preceded by: John Kavanagh
- Succeeded by: Monica Harte
- In office 26 November 2004 – 29 November 2008
- Preceded by: Ward created
- Succeeded by: Enver Erdogan

Personal details
- Party: Labor (suspended in 2022)

Milad El-Halabi is an Australian former politician. He was a councillor on the City of Moreland in Victoria from 2004 until 2008, and again from 2020 until 2022.

In February 2022, El-Halabi resigned as a councillor after being charged with conspiracy to cheat and defraud for allegedly tampering with the council election in his ward. It was later found that he had been unduly elected.

== Political career ==
El-Halabi was first elected to the City of Moreland in North-West Ward at the 2004 local elections. He was defeated in 2008, receiving 4.13% of the vote.

He unsuccessfully contested the 2012 and 2016 local elections, receiving 3.22% and 3.78% of the vote respectively.

At the 2020 local elections, El-Halabi returned to the council as the fourth councillor elected in North-West Ward.

On 10 February 2022, El-Halabi was being charged by Victoria Police with conspiracy to cheat and defraud for allegedly tampering with the election in his ward. He was suspended as a member of the Labor Party, then resigned as a councillor. He was replaced via countback the following month by Socialist Alliance's Monica Harte.

El-Halabi, his wife Dianna and his daughter Tania, were alleged to have stolen multiple ballot papers and lodged them with the Victorian Electoral Commission, therefore prejudicing the election result.

On 31 March 2023, the Victorian Civil and Administrative Tribunal (VCAT) found that El-Halabi was unduly elected, but the election of the 3 other councillors to North-West Ward was not affected by the inclusion of fraudulent ballots in the count. El-Halabi continues to deny all allegations.
