= 2002 Victorian local elections =

- 16 March 2002
- Registered: 560,000+

	First party	Second party	Third party
	IND
Leader	None	N/A	N/A
Party	Independents	Labor	Liberal
Last election	131 (Note: This only includes the 17 councils up for election in 2002, not councillors in the remaining 53 councils.)	22	3
Seats before	129	23	3
Seats won	124	19	5
Seat change	▼5	▼4	▲2
Popular vote	443,889	56,771	20,804
Percentage	81.76%	10.20%	3.74%
	Fourth party	Fifth party	Sixth party
		SOC	SA
Leader	No leader	No leader	No leader
Party	Greens	Socialist	Socialist Alliance
Last election	0	0	Did not exist
Seats before	1	0	0
Seats won	6	0	0
Seat change	▲5	Steady	Steady
Popular vote	17,951	988	714
Percentage	3.22%	0.18%	0.13%
Swing		▲0.18	▲0.13

The 2002 Victorian local elections were held on 16 March 2002 to elect the councils of 17 of the 78 local government areas in Victoria, Australia.

Until 2008, local elections in Victoria were conducted periodically, meaning 53 councils were not up for election in 2002. The City of Melbourne was initially scheduled to hold its election in 2002, but it was instead brought forward to 22 July 2001 following a change to its electoral structure.

All elections were conducted by the Victorian Electoral Commission with the exception of the City of Moreland, which conducted its own election.

27 candidates were elected unopposed across the state, 24 of which were independents.

== Results ==
=== Council votes ===
Party	Votes	%	Swing	Seats	Change
Independents	455,160	81.76		124	▼7
Labor	56,771	10.20		19	▼4
Liberal	20,804	3.74		5	▲2
Greens	17,951	3.22		6	▲6
Independent Labor	4,328	0.77		1	▲1
Socialist	988	0.18	+0.18	0	Steady
Socialist Alliance	714	0.13	+0.13	0	Steady
Total	556,725	100.0		155	
Informal votes					
Turnout					

=== Council control ===
Party	Councils	
Party	Number	Change
Independent	14	▼1
No overall control	1	▲1
Labor	2	Steady

== Aftermath ==
Labor retained control of the City of Darebin and gained control of the City of Moreland, but lost control of the City of Yarra as a result of Greens, Independent Labor and independent gains.

In addition to retaining two wards in Boroondara, the Liberal Party gained two seats in Greater Bendigo − Greg Williams (Eppalock) and Kevin Gibbins (Whipstick). A fifth Liberal councillor (Geoff White in Glenelg) was re-elected unopposed.

Following the elections, the amount of LGAs expanded from 78 to 79 when the Delatite Shire was split into the Rural City of Benalla and the Shire of Mansfield.
