= City of Moonee Valley =

Coordinates: 37°46′S 144°55′E

- Local government area
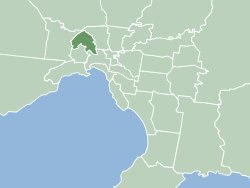
- Location within Melbourne metropolitan area.

- Interactive map of City of Moonee Valley
- Country: Australia
- State: Victoria
- Region: Greater Melbourne
- Established: December 1994
- Council seat: Moonee Ponds

Government
  - Mayor: Cr Fran Cosgriff
  - State electorates: Essendon; Niddrie
  - Federal divisions: Maribyrnong; Melbourne; Wills

Area
  - Total: 43 km^{2} (17 sq mi)

Population
  - Total: 130,501 (2025)
  - Density: 3,030/km^{2} (7,860/sq mi)
- Website: City of Moonee Valley
LGAs around City of Moonee Valley
Brimbank	Merri-bek	Merri-bek
Brimbank	City of Moonee Valley	Merri-bek
Brimbank	Maribyrnong	Melbourne

The City of Moonee Valley is a local government area located within the metropolitan area of Melbourne, Victoria, Australia. It comprises the inner north-western suburbs between 3 and 13 kilometres from the Melbourne city centre. In 2023, the City of Moonee Valley Estimated Resident Population was 126,486, with a population density of 2,935 persons per square km, based on the 2023 Census.

== History ==
The original logo

The City of Moonee Valley was formed in December 1994 after the merger of the City of Essendon (which had been expanded south-eastwards in 1993) and the part of the City of Keilor south-east of the Albion–Jacana railway line.

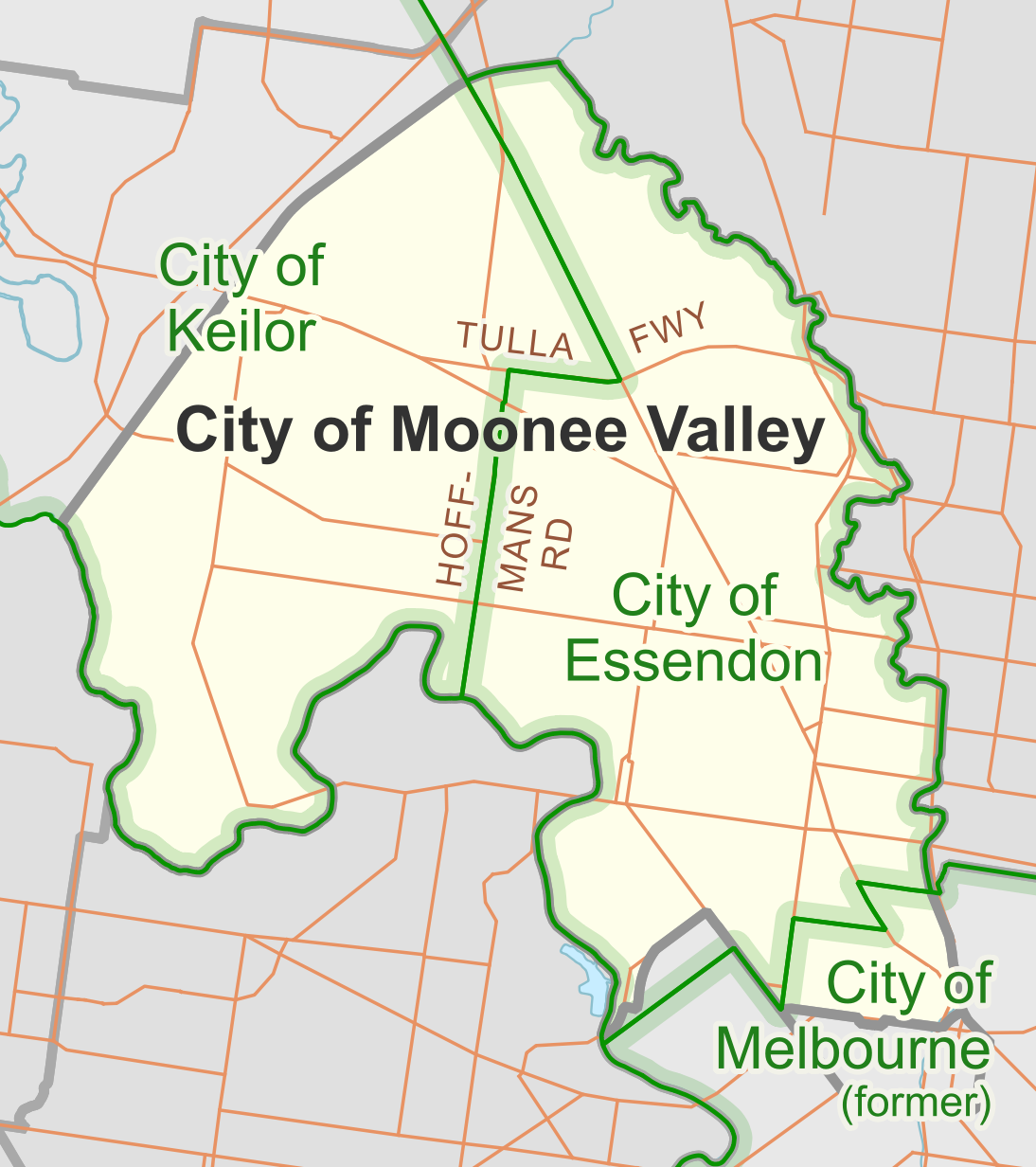
The City's predecessor LGAs (green) as they were in 1993

On 1 July 2008, the parts of North Melbourne and Kensington in the Moonee Valley LGA were transferred to the City of Melbourne.

The original council logo from 1994 was replaced in February 2010.

Exchange prefixes in the city are 937x, 837x, 933x or 833x (the latter left over from the old City of Keilor).

== Features ==
The Moonee Valley is a culturally diverse region with a residential population and various commercial set-ups and industries. It comprises the Moonee Valley Racecourse, Essendon Airport and has several shopping precincts, restaurants, parks and offices. It is easily accessible through trams and the Craigieburn train line. It has close to 10,000 businesses operating in the region.

== Council ==
=== Wards ===
Prior to the 2024 Council Elections, The City of Moonee Valley had three wards: Buckley, Myrnong and Rose Hill.

Buckley Ward comprises Essendon Fields, Essendon North, Strathmore, Aberfeldie, most of Essendon and Strathmore Heights, and parts of Moonee Ponds and Essendon West.

Myrnong Ward comprises Ascot Vale, Flemington, Travancore, most of Moonee Ponds and part of Essendon.

Rose Hill Ward comprises Avondale Heights, Keilor East, Airport West, Niddrie, most of Essendon West and part of Strathmore Heights.

2024 ward boundaries. Expand the map and click on a ward to see the ward name.

At the 2024 Council Elections, nine wards were established with each ward electing once councillor each. The following wards were established;

- Airport Ward
- Buckley Ward
- Canning Ward
- Fairbairn Ward
- Milleara Ward
- Myrnong Ward
- Queens Park Ward
- Steele Creek Ward
- Woodlands Ward

=== Current composition ===
Councillors are elected from nine single member wards. The current council was elected in October 2024, its composition is:

Ward	Party	Councillor	Notes
Airport	Independent Liberal	Hamish Jones	
Buckley	Independent One Nation	John Barnes	Elected to council as an Independent Liberal - announced as a One Nation candidate for the Division of Essendon in August 2026.
Canning	Labor	Paula Theocharides	
Fairbairn	Labor	Phil Burn	Deputy Mayor
Milleara	Independent	John Sipek	
Myrnong	Labor	Rose Iser	Mayor
Queens Park	Independent	Ava Adams	
Steele Creek	Independent Liberal	Samantha Byrne	
Woodlands	Labor	Fran Cosgriff	

=== Mayors ===
The current mayor is Rose Iser and the Deputy Mayor is Phil Burn. They were elected by council in October 2025 and will serve the 2025–26 year.

== Past councillors ==
=== 2008−2024 (three wards) ===
==== Buckley Ward ====
Year (Note: Known as Central Ward until 2012.)	Councillor	Party	Councillor	Party	Councillor	Party
2008	Jan Chantry	Labor	Paul Giuliano	Independent	Narelle Sharpe	Independent
2012	Jan Chantry	Labor	Paul Giuliano	Independent	Narelle Sharpe	Independent
2016	Rebecca Gauci Maurici	Liberal	Richard Lawrence	Independent	Narelle Sharpe	Independent
2020	Cam Nation	Independent	Ava Adams	Independent	Narelle Sharpe	Independent
2024	Jessica O'Neil	Independent	Ava Adams	Independent	Narelle Sharpe	Independent

==== Myrnong Ward ====
Year (Note: Known as South Ward until 2012.)	Councillor	Party	Councillor	Party	Councillor	Party
2008	Jim Cusack	Labor	Rose Iser	Greens	James Rankin	Independent
2011	Jim Cusack	Labor	Miriam Gillis	Independent	James Rankin	Independent
2012	Jim Cusack	Labor	Nicole Marshall	Labor	Cam Nation	Liberal
2014	Jim Cusack	Labor	Nicole Marshall	Labor	Cam Nation	No East West Link
2015	Jim Cusack	Labor	Nicole Marshall	Labor	Cam Nation	Independent
2016	Jim Cusack	Labor	Nicole Marshall	Labor	Cam Nation	Independent
2020	Katrina Hodgson	Labor	Rose Iser	Independent	Jacob Bettio	Independent
2024	Katrina Hodgson	Labor	Rose Iser	Labor	Jacob Bettio	Independent

==== Rose Hill Ward ====
Year (Note: Known as West Ward until 2012.)	Councillor	Party	Councillor	Party	Councillor	Party
2008	John Sipek	Labor	Shirley Cornish	Labor	Ange Kenos	Independent
2012	John Sipek	Labor	Shirley Cornish	Labor	Andra Surace	Independent
2016	John Sipek	Independent	Shirley Cornish	Labor	Andra Surace	Independent
2016	John Sipek	Independent	Samantha Byrne	Independent	Andra Surace	Independent
2020	John Sipek	Independent	Samantha Byrne	Independent	Pierce Tyson	Labor

== Libraries ==
The City of Moonee Valley has five libraries:

- Ascot Vale Library
- Avondale Heights Library and Learning Centre
- Flemington Library
- Niddrie Library
- Sam Merrifield Library (Moonee Ponds)

The libraries offer uncommon services such as a seed library, where customers can take home seeds to grow plants or flowers. In 2024, Moonee Valley Libraries removed overdue fines for late return of items. The change was made to remove a potential barrier of people using the library services.

== Townships and localities ==
At the 2021 census, the city had a population of 121,851 up from 116,671 at the 2016 census.

Population
Locality	2016	2021
Aberfeldie	3,897	3,925
Airport West	7,564	8,173
Ascot Vale	14,750	15,197
Avondale Heights	11,633	12,388
Essendon	20,596	21,240
Essendon Fields	0	13
Essendon North	2,987	3,071
Essendon West	1,439	1,559
Flemington^	7,719	7,025
Keilor East^	14,514	15,078
Moonee Ponds	14,250	16,224
Niddrie	5,479	5,901
Strathmore	8,419	8,980
Strathmore Heights	1,004	1,047
Travancore	2,480	2,116

^ - Territory divided with another LGA

== See also ==
- List of places on the Victorian Heritage Register in the City of Moonee Valley
- Moonee Ponds, Victoria
- Moonee Ponds Creek Trail
- Moonee Ponds Creek
- Clocktower Centre
- Keilor East railway station
- Airport West, Victoria
- Moonee Valley Racing Club
- Maribyrnong River
- Essendon Airport
