= City of Merri-bek =

Merri-bek City Council
- Local government area
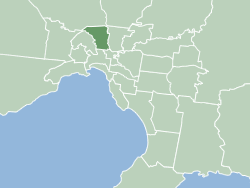
- Location within Melbourne metropolitan area

- Interactive map of Merri-bek City Council
- Coordinates: 37°44′S 144°57′E
- Country: Australia
- State: Victoria
- Region: Greater Melbourne
- Established: 1994
- Council seat: Coburg

Government
  - Mayor: Nat Abboud (Independent)
  - State electorates: Broadmeadows; Brunswick; Melbourne; Niddrie; Pascoe Vale
  - Federal divisions: Cooper; Maribyrnong; Wills

Area
  - Total: 51 km^{2} (20 sq mi)

Population
  - Total: 181,725 (2018) (33rd)
  - Density: 3,560/km^{2} (9,230/sq mi)
- Website: Merri-bek City Council
LGAs around Merri-bek City Council
Hume, Brimbank	Hume	Whittlesea
Moonee Valley	Merri-bek City Council	Darebin
Moonee Valley	Melbourne	Yarra

Previous logo of the City of Moreland

The City of Merri-bek (/ˈmɛriː bɛk/), formerly the City of Moreland, is a local government area in metropolitan Melbourne, Australia. It comprises the inner northern suburbs between 4 and 11 kilometres from the Melbourne CBD. The Merri-bek local government area covers 51 km^{2} (20 sq mi), and in June 2018, it had a population of 181,725.

== History ==
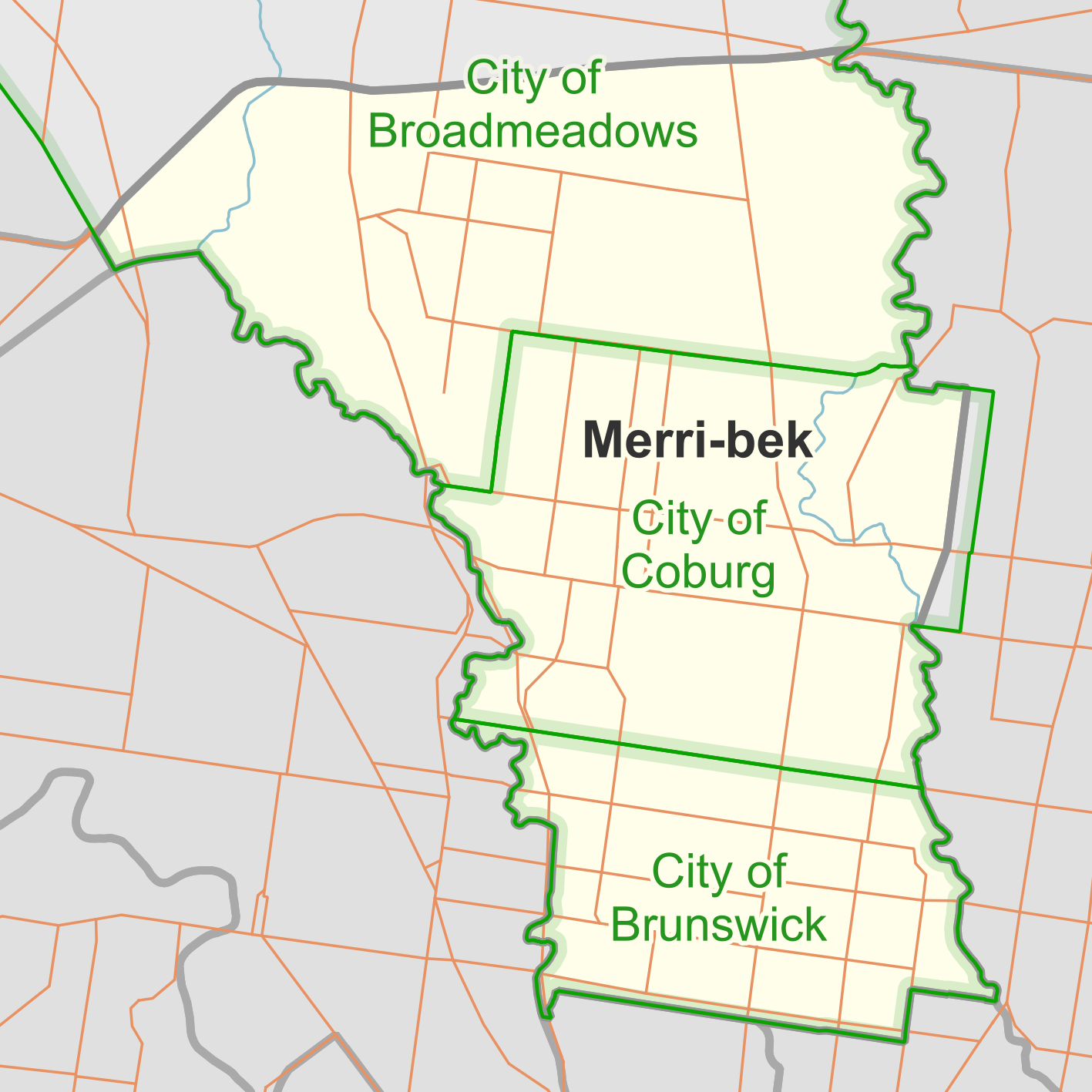
The City of Merri-bek's predecessor LGAs (green) as they were in 1994

The local government area was created as the City of Moreland in 1994 during the amalgamations of local governments by the state government, being created from the former local government areas of the City of Brunswick, the City of Coburg and the southern part of the City of Broadmeadows. It was renamed to Merri-bek in September 2022.

In 2004 the Victorian Electoral Commission (VEC), an independent authority created under Victorian state legislation, conducted a representation review of the council's electoral structure, resulting in a recommendation that the 10 single councillor wards be replaced by three multi-councillor wards. A consequence of the change from single-councillor to multi-councillor wards was a change in election method from Instant runoff voting to proportional representation via Single transferable vote. Elections are held every four years.

=== Renaming ===
In November 2021, it came to the council's attention that Moreland's namesake was indirectly associated with a Jamaican plantation site that had traded slaves up to the 1800s. This historical information was contained in the 2010 Moreland Council publication Thematic History, and published in books and articles as far back as 1944.

In October 1839, Scottish surgeon and settler Dr Farquhar McCrae was sold land between Moonee Ponds Creek and Sydney Road by the Crown in the area's first colonial sale. McCrae gave the land the name Moreland. Some suggest he may have taken this name from a Jamaican sugar plantation that his paternal grandfather Alexander McCrae worked at from the late 1760s to the early 1790s, which was involved in slave trading, and kept up to 500 to 700 enslaved people in the operation in any one year. Greens Mayor Mark Riley said "The history behind the naming of this area is painful, uncomfortable and very wrong. It needs to be addressed". In May 2022 a choice of three proposed names from the Woi-wurrung language was announced by Riley and Uncle Andrew Gardiner, deputy chair of the Wurundjeri Woi-wurrung Cultural Heritage Aboriginal Corporation: Wa-dam-buk, meaning “renew”; Merri-bek, meaning “rocky country”; and Jerrang, meaning “leaf of tree”. The names were scheduled to be decided by July 2022 following community consultation.

The community consultation for the renaming commenced in May 2022 and ended June 2022. Some residents expressed dissatisfaction with the process resulting in a petition to council.

On 3 July 2022 (coinciding with the start of NAIDOC Week) the Council voted at a Special Council Meeting to officially endorse Merri-bek as the preferred name. The name was submitted to the Minister for Local Government for consideration and the Minister's decision to alter the name was gazetted on 13 September 2022 and came into operation on 26 September.

== Council services ==
Merri-bek Council runs the Counihan Gallery at the Brunswick Town Hall, a free public art gallery named after the local artist, Noel Counihan. Other art events supported by Council include the MoreArt event, an art in public spaces show located along the Upfield transport corridor. The council also sponsors various street festivals around the municipality, the best known being the Sydney Road Street Party.

One of the highlights of Merri-bek is its public library. Merri-bek City Libraries has five branches.

Other Merri-bek local government services include maternal and child health service, waste and recycling collection, parks and open space, a youth space called Oxygen, services for children, and aged services.

== Climate action ==
A January 2020 ClimateWorks Australia local government report identified City of Moreland as one of 3 out of 57 municipal jurisdictions in Australia to have a "fully aligned net zero by 2050 target that addresses both operational and community emissions."

The City of Merri-bek is a member of ICLEI – Local Governments for Sustainability, the Global Covenant of Mayors for Climate & Energy, the Cities Power Partnership, Climate Emergency Australia (CEA), Climate Active, The Northern Alliance for Greenhouse Action (NAGA), and has declared pledges in the TAKE2 scheme with Sustainability Victoria.

Council declared a climate emergency on 12 September 2018.

=== Council operational emissions reduction ===
For operational emissions, Moreland Council was certified as a ‘carbon neutral’ council in 2012. This required purchase of carbon offset credits. Moreland was the second council in Victoria, and the third in Australia, to receive this certification. A target of 30% less emissions than 2011, with a stretch goal of 40% by 2020, was over-achieved with an emissions cut of 69% by 2020, which will reduce the carbon offsets required to be purchased.

Moreland City Council installed Victoria's first EV fast charge station in 2013. This has now grown to a network of 16 public EV charging stations around the municipality which are powered by 100% zero emissions renewable energy from the Crowlands Wind Farm, near Ararat.

In 2014, City of Moreland joined with the City of Melbourne and several other institutions and established the Melbourne Renewable Energy Project (MREP). This project developed and funded the construction of a purpose-built 39 turbine, 80 MW Crowlands windfarm, which started supplying 100% renewables power to Council facilities and buildings in 2019.

=== Net zero by 2040 community emissions target ===
Moreland's community wide municipal emissions in 2019 were 1,609,000 tonnes CO2e, composed of sectoral emissions of: Waste (3%), Transport (17%), Gas (21%), Electricity (59%).

The City of Merri-bek has set a community emissions reduction target of net zero emissions by 2040 and established the Moreland Zero Carbon 2040 Framework Strategy and the first 5-year action plan to achieve that target.

=== Climate related policies and strategies ===
Other key climate and sustainability policies and strategies driving climate action include: Climate Emergency Action Plan (2020 to 2025), Moreland Integrated Transport Strategy, Waste and Litter Strategy, Achieving zero Carbon in the Planning Scheme, Sustainable Buildings Policy, Urban Heat Island Effect Action Plan, Urban Forest Strategy, Watermap, Procurement policy, Cooling the Upfield Corridor Action Plan, Food Systems Strategy, Fossil Fuel Divestment Strategy, Moreland Nature Plan.

=== Climate action endorsements ===
During 2021 City of Moreland supported a climate disaster levy on coal exports, and endorsed the Fossil Fuel Non-Proliferation Treaty Initiative, the first government jurisdiction in Australia to do so.

== Council ==
=== Current composition ===
Merri-bek City Council

Leadership
- Mayor: Natalie Abboud, Independent
- Deputy Mayor: Helen Davidson, Your Local Independents

Structure
- Council political groups: Greens: 4 seats Labor: 3 seats Your Local Independents: 2 seats Socialist Alliance: 1 seat Independent: 1 seat

Councillors are elected from eleven single-member wards. The council's most recent election took place in October 2024. Since then, Merri-bek has consisted of the following councillors:

Ward	Party	Councillor	Notes
Bababi Djinanang	Socialist Alliance	Sue Bolton	
Box Forest	Labor	Chris Miles	
Brunswick West	Greens	Ella Svensson	
Bulleke-bek	Greens	Jay Iwasaki	
Djirri-Djirri	Your Local Independents	Helen Davidson	Deputy Mayor
Harmony Park	Labor	Helen Politis	
Pascoe Vale South	Your Local Independents	Oscar Yildiz	
Pentridge	Independent	Natalie Abboud	Mayor
Randazzo	Greens	Liz Irvin	
Warrk-Warrk	Greens	Adam Pulford	
Westbreen	Labor	Katerine Theodosis	

=== Mayor ===
The current mayor for 2025-2026 is Cr Natalie Abboud, while the current deputy mayor for 2025-2026 is Cr Dr Jay Iwasaki.

== Past councillors ==
=== 1996–2004 (10 wards) ===
Year	Box Forest	Glencairn	Grandview	Hoffman	Lincoln Mills	Lygon	Merri	Moonah	Newlands	Westbreen
Year	Councillor	Councillor	Councillor	Councillor	Councillor	Councillor	Councillor	Councillor	Councillor	Councillor
1996	John Sawyer (Independent)	Christos Iliopoulos (ALP)	Rosemary Kerr (Independent)	Mike Hill (Labor)	Rod Higgins (Labor)	Glenyys Romanes (Labor)	Anthony Helou (Labor)	Andrew Rowe (Labor)	Stella Kariofyllidis (Labor)	Geoff Lutz (Independent)
1999	Ken Blair (Independent)	Robert Larocca (Labor)	Rosemary Kerr (Independent)	Andy Ingham (Independent)	Rod Higgins (Labor)	Leigh Snelling (Labor)	Anthony Helou (Labor)	Andrew Rowe (Labor)	Stella Kariofyllidis (Labor)	Melanie Raymond (Independent)
2000	Ken Blair (Independent)	Robert Larocca (Labor)	Rosemary Kerr (Independent)	Andy Ingham (Independent)	Vicki Yianoulatos (Labor)	Leigh Snelling (Labor)	Anthony Helou (Labor)	Andrew Rowe (Labor)	Stella Kariofyllidis (Labor)	Melanie Raymond (Independent)
2001	Ken Blair (Independent)	Robert Larocca (Labor)	Rosemary Kerr (Independent)	Joe Caputo (Labor)	Vicki Yianoulatos (Labor)	Leigh Snelling (Labor)	Anthony Helou (Labor)	Andrew Rowe (Labor)	Stella Kariofyllidis (Labor)	Melanie Raymond (Independent)
2002	Ken Blair (Independent)	Robert Larocca (Labor)	Stephen Roach (Independent)	Joe Caputo (Labor)	Vicki Yianoulatos (Labor)	Fraser Brindley (Greens)	Anthony Helou (Labor)	Mark Higginbotham (Labor)	Stella Kariofyllidis (Labor)	Joe Ficarra (Labor)

=== 2004–2024 (three wards) ===
==== North-East Ward ====
Year	Councillor	Party	Councillor	Party	Councillor	Party	Councillor	Party
2004	Anthony Helou	Labor	Mark O'Brien	Labor	Andrea Sharam	Greens	Daniel De Lorenzis	Independent
2008	Anthony Helou	Labor	Michael Teti	Labor	Toby Archer	Greens	Stella Kariofyllidis	Labor
2012	Anthony Helou	Labor	Michael Teti	Labor	Lenka Thompson	Greens	Stella Kariofyllidis	Labor
2012	Sue Bolton	Socialist Alliance	Michael Teti	Labor	Lenka Thompson	Greens	Rob Thompson	Independent Liberal
2016	Sue Bolton	Socialist Alliance	Annalivia Carli Hannan	Labor	Natalie Abboud	Greens	Ali Irfanli	Independent
2020	Sue Bolton	Sue Bolton Moreland Team	Annalivia Carli Hannan	Labor	Adam Pulford	Greens	Helen Pavlidis-Mihalakos	Independent
2022a	Sue Bolton	Socialist Alliance	Annalivia Carli Hannan	Labor	Adam Pulford	Greens	Helen Pavlidis-Mihalakos	Victorians
2022b	Sue Bolton	Socialist Alliance	Annalivia Carli Hannan	Labor	Adam Pulford	Greens	Helen Pavlidis-Mihalakos	Independent

==== North-West Ward ====
Year	Councillor	Party	Councillor	Party	Councillor	Party	Councillor	Party
2004	Mark Higginbotham	Labor	Kathleen Matthews-Ward	Labor	John Kavanagh	Democratic Labour	Milad El-Halabi	Labor
2008	Oscar Yildiz	Labor	Kathleen Matthews-Ward	Labor	John Kavanagh	Democratic Labour	Enver Erdogan	Labor
2012	Oscar Yildiz	Labor	Helen Davidson	Independent	John Kavanagh	Democratic Labour	Lita Gillies	Labor
2014	Oscar Yildiz	Labor	Helen Davidson	Independent	John Kavanagh	Independent	Lita Gillies	Labor
2016	Oscar Yildiz	Labor	Helen Davidson	Independent	John Kavanagh	Independent	Dale Martin	Greens
2018	Oscar Yildiz	Independent	Helen Davidson	Independent	John Kavanagh	Independent	Dale Martin	Greens
2020	Oscar Yildiz	Independent	Helen Davidson	Independent	Milad El-Halabi	Labor	Angelica Panopoulos	Greens
2021	Oscar Yildiz	Victorians	Helen Davidson	Independent	Milad El-Halabi	Labor	Angelica Panopoulos	Greens
2022a	Oscar Yildiz	Victorians	Helen Davidson	Independent	Milad El-Halabi	Independent Labor	Angelica Panopoulos	Greens
2022b	Oscar Yildiz	Independent	Helen Davidson	Independent	Monica Harte	Socialist Alliance	Angelica Panopoulos	Greens

==== South Ward ====
Year	Councillor	Party	Councillor	Party	Councillor	Party
2004	Joe Caputo	Labor	Alice Pryor	Labor	Josephine Connellan	Greens
2008	Lambros Tapinos	Labor	Alice Pryor	Labor	Josephine Connellan	Greens
2012	Lambros Tapinos	Labor	Meghan Hopper	Labor	Samantha Ratnam	Greens
2016	Lambros Tapinos	Labor	Mark Riley	Greens	Samantha Ratnam	Greens
2017	Lambros Tapinos	Labor	Mark Riley	Greens	Jess Dorney	Greens
2020	Lambros Tapinos	Labor	Mark Riley	Greens	James Conlan	Greens
2023	Lambros Tapinos	Labor	Mark Riley	Greens	James Conlan	Independent

=== 2024 (11 wards) ===
Year	Bababi Djinanang	Box Forest	Brunswick West	Bulleke-bek	Djirri-Djirri	Harmony Park	Pascoe Vale South	Pentridge	Randazzo	Warrk-Warrk	Westbreen
Year	Councillor	Councillor	Councillor	Councillor	Councillor	Councillor	Councillor	Councillor	Councillor	Councillor	Councillor
2024	Sue Bolton (Socialist Alliance)	Chris Miles (Labor)	Ella Svensson (Greens)	Jay Iwasaki (Greens)	Helen Davidson (Your Local Independents)	Helen Politis (Labor)	Oscar Yildiz (Your Local Independents)	Natalie Abboud (Independent)	Liz Irvin (Greens)	Adam Pulford (Greens)	Katerine Theodosis (Labor)

== Election results ==
=== 2024 ===
2024 Victorian local elections: Merri-bek
Party	Votes	%	Swing	Seats	Change
Labor	23,108	24.48	+4.18	3	Steady
Your Local Independents	21,930	23.23	+1.89 (Note: Compared to the results of Oscar Yildiz, Helen Davidson and Helen Pavlidis-Mihalakos in 2020.)	2	▼1
Greens	21,069	22.32	+6.40	4	Steady
Victorian Socialists	11,068	11.72	+7.77	0	Steady
Independents	8,965	9.50	−35.10	1	▲1
Socialist Alliance	6,266	6.63	+1.71	1	Steady
Independent Liberal	1,621	1.71	+1.71	0	Steady
Fusion	351	0.37	+0.37	0	Steady
Formal votes	94,378	97.11			
Informal votes	2,810	2.89			
Total	97,188	100.00			
Registered voters / turnout	123,327	78.81			

=== 2020 ===
2020 Victorian local elections: Moreland
Party	Votes	%	Swing	Seats	Change
Independent	41,866	44.60	+4.16	3	▼1
Labor	20,901	20.30	−8.30	3	▲1
Greens	16,396	15.92	−13.92	4	Steady
Sue Bolton Moreland Team	5,062	4.92	+0.21	1	Steady
Reason	4,637	4.50	+4.50	0	Steady
Victorian Socialists	4,068	3.95	+3.95	0	Steady
Animal Justice	935	0.91	+0.91	0	Steady

=== 2016 ===
2016 Victorian local elections: Moreland
Party	Votes	%	Seats	Change
Independent	25,164	36.49	4	▲2
Greens	20,582	29.84	4	▲3
Labor	19,728	28.60	2	▼1
Socialist Alliance	3,249	4.71	1	Steady
Formal votes	39,365	100.0		

=== 2002 ===
2002 Victorian local elections: Moreland
Party	Votes	%	Seats	Change
Labor	18,237	46.33	7	▲3
Independent	11,271	28.64	2	▼4
Greens	9,134	23.21	1	▲1
Socialist Alliance	714	1.82	0	Steady
Total formal votes	39,365	100.0		

== Townships and localities ==
At the 2021 census, the city had a population of 171,357 up from 162,558 at the 2016 census.

Suburbs of City of Merri-bek

Population
Locality	2016	2021
Brunswick	24,473	24,896
Brunswick East	11,504	13,279
Brunswick West	14,159	14,746
Coburg^	26,185	26,574
Coburg North	7,601	8,327
Fawkner^	14,043	14,274
Fitzroy North^	12,339	12,781
Glenroy	22,245	23,792
Gowanbrae	2,773	2,971
Hadfield	5,610	6,269
Oak Park	6,205	6,714
Parkville^	7,409	7,074
Pascoe Vale	17,051	18,171
Pascoe Vale South	10,069	10,534
Tullamarine^	6,605	6,733

^ - Territory divided with another LGA

== Sister cities ==
- Xianyang, Shaanxi, China
- Solarino, Italy
- Canterbury, New South Wales, Australia
- (Timor-Leste) Aileu, East Timor
- Mansfield, Victoria, Australia
- Sparta, Greece
- Çorum, Turkey

== See also ==
- List of Melbourne suburbs
