= 2000 Victorian local elections =

← 1999	18 March 2000	2001 →
- Turnout: 78.5%

The 2000 Victorian local elections were held on 18 March 2000 to elect the councils of 41 of the 78 local government areas in Victoria, Australia.

Until 2008, local elections in Victoria were conducted periodically, meaning 37 councils were not up for election in 2000.

== Candidates ==
=== Delatite ===
Nominations closed on 15 February 2000. A number of candidates were selected by the Mansfield District Ratepayers and Residents Association, these are noted with "MDRRA" in brackets. The sole candidates in Benalla Heritage and Mokoan were elected unopposed.

==== Alpine ====
Incumbent Barb Jones.

- Marian Dowling
- Jessica Graves (MDRRA)
- Barb Jones

==== Benalla Civic ====
Incumbent Michael Teague (retiring).

- Vincent Branigan
- Peter Brown
- John Brownstein
- Gayle Newnham

==== Benalla Gardens ====
Incumbent Eric Brewer.

- Eric Brewer
- Kathleen Rees

==== Benalla Heritage ====
Incumbent Brian Caughey.

- Geoff Oliver

==== Lakeland ====
Incumbent Tom Ingpen.

- Tom Ingpen
- Steven Junghenn (MDRRA)

==== Mansfield Central ====
Incumbent Ray Robinson.

- Ray Robinson
- Will Twycross (MDRRA)

==== Mokoan ====
Incumbent Ken Whan.

- Ken Whan

==== Swanpool ====
Incumbent Bill Hill.

- Don Cummins (MDRRA)
- Bill Hill
