= 2016 Victorian local elections =

Local government elections in Australia

- 22 October 2016
	First party	Second party	Third party
	IND		SOC
Party	Independents	Greens	The Socialists
Last election		18 seats	Did not exist
Seats before		16	1
Seats won		29	1
Seat change		▲13	Steady
	Fourth party	Fifth party	Sixth party
	SA	RUAP	LDP
Party	Socialist Alliance	Rise Up	Liberal Democrats
Last election	1 seat	1 seat	0 seats
Seats before	1	1	0
Seats won	1	1	1
Seat change	Steady	Steady	▲1
	Seventh party
	CA
Leader	Russell Bate
Party	Country Alliance
Last election	1 seat
Seats before	1
Seats won	0
Seat change	▼1

The 2016 Victorian local elections were held on 22 October 2016 to elect the councils of the 79 local government areas in Victoria, Australia.

The elections saw the largest-ever amount of Greens councillors elected, with the party increasing their local government representatives from 17 to 29. The Labor Party and Liberal Party did not endorse any candidates.

== Party changes before elections ==
A number of councillors joined or left parties before the 2016 elections.

Council	Ward	Councillor	Former party	New party	Date
Campaspe	Kyabram	Robert Danieli	Independent	Katter's Australian	November/December 2012
Darebin	Cazaly	Vince Fontana	Labor	Independent	6 December 2012
Darebin	Cazaly	Vince Fontana	Independent	Mutual	30 January 2014
Darebin	Cazaly	Julie Williams	Independent	Mutual	30 January 2014
Glen Eira	Rosstown	Neil Pilling	Greens	Independent	20 May 2014
Darebin	La Trobe	Gaetano Greco	Labor	Independent	Post-May 2014
Darebin	Cazaly	Vince Fontana	Mutual	Independent	2014
Darebin	Cazaly	Julie Williams	Mutual	Independent	2014
Moreland	North-West	John Kavanagh	Democratic Labour	Independent	2014
Moonee Valley	Myrnong	Cam Nation	Independent Liberal	No East West Link	15 September 2014
Moyne	Unsubdivided	James Purcell	Independent	Vote 1 Local Jobs	October 2014
Greater Bendigo	Lockwood	Elise Chapman	Independent	Country Alliance	15 October 2014
Greater Geelong	Austin	John Irvine	Independent	Country Alliance	16 October 2014
Port Phillip	Albert Park	Amanda Stevens	Labor	Independent Labor	26 February 2015
Moyne	Unsubdivided	Jim Doukas	Independent	Country Alliance	Mid-2015
Moonee Valley	Myrnong	Cam Nation	No East West Link	Independent	2015
Greater Bendigo	Lockwood	Elise Chapman	Country Alliance	Independent	2015
Greater Geelong	Austin	John Irvine	Country Alliance	Independent	2015
Greater Bendigo	Lockwood	Elise Chapman	Independent	One Nation	8 January 2016
Yarra	Langridge	Stephen Jolly	Socialist	The Socialists	22 February 2016
Moonee Valley	Rose Hill	John Sipek	Labor	Independent	Mid-2016
Darebin	Cazaly	Julie Williams	Independent	Labor	Pre-October 2016

== Results ==
Party	Votes	%	Swing	Seats	Change
Independents					
Labor					
Liberal					
Burwood Liberals					
Greens				29	▲11
Independent National					
Team Doyle	27,116			3	
Together Melbourne	6,578			1	
Phil Cleary Means Business	5,667			1	
Stephen Mayne T.I.A.E.	3,666			0	
Team Morgan - A City That Works	3,557			1	
Strengthening Melbourne	1,905			0	
Listening To Locals	1,718			0	
An Indigenous Voice On Council	1,534			1	▲1
Serving Melbourne With Integrity	1,519			0	
The Light On The Hill Team	960			0	
The Heritage Agenda	816			0	
Melburnian Voice	808			0	
Science	82			0	Steady
Liberal Democrats				1	▲1
The Socialists				1	▲1
Rise Up Australia				1	Steady
Socialist Alliance				1	Steady
Animal Justice				0	Steady
Independent Labor					

== Aftermath ==
On 8 November, Melbourne councillor-elect Brooke Wandin (An Indigenous Voice On Council) stood down from her position amid an investigation by the Local Government Investigations and Compliance Inspectorate into her eligibility. Wandin and former councillor Richard Foster were later charged with electoral fraud, with prosecutors alleging Wandin did not live at the Kensington address she had nominated when registering for election. Both parties plead guilty to charges of electoral fraud; Foster received a 12-month good behaviour bond, while Wandin was placed onto a diversion program. Nic Frances Gilley was declared elected in Wandin's place.

Additionally in Melbourne, Phil Cleary Means Business councillor Michael Caiafa lost his seat in March 2017 after it was determined he was not duly elected. Team Doyle's Susan Riley was declared elected in his place.

In April 2017, hundreds of people reported receiving infringement notices for allegedly having not voted, despite claiming that they had.

== By-elections and countbacks ==
The Victorian Electoral Commission held a number of by-elections and countbacks to fill vacancies on councils after the 2016 elections up until the 2020 elections.

Casey City Council was sacked on 18 February 2020 before two countbacks could occur.

=== By-elections ===
Council	Ward	Before		Change		Result after preference distribution			
Council	Ward	Councillor	Party	Cause	Date	Date	Party	Candidate	%
Northern Grampians	South West	Sharon Telford	Independent	Resignation	5 October 2017	17 February 2018	Independent	Stephen Gardner	52.17
Northern Grampians	South West	Sharon Telford	Independent	Resignation	5 October 2017	17 February 2018	Independent	Christine Fitzgerald	47.83
Pyrenees	Beaufort	Michael O'Connor	Independent	Death	15 May 2018	17 August 2018	Independent	Damian Ferrari	51.16
Pyrenees	Beaufort	Michael O'Connor	Independent	Death	15 May 2018	17 August 2018	Independent	Barbara Blamey (Note: Second-placed on primary vote as the by-election did not require preference distribution.)	32.56
Knox	Collier	Jackson Taylor	Labor	Elected to Victorian Parliament	6 December 2018	30 March 2019	Independent	Marcia Timmers-Leitch	53.04
Knox	Collier	Jackson Taylor	Labor	Elected to Victorian Parliament	6 December 2018	30 March 2019	Independent	Robert Williams	28.87
Hepburn	Coliban	Sebastian Klein	Independent	Resignation	18 December 2018	5 April 2019	Ind. Labor	Licia Kokocinski	58.82
Hepburn	Coliban	Sebastian Klein	Independent	Resignation	18 December 2018	5 April 2019	Independent	John McLaren	41.18
Swan Hill	Murray-Mallee	Gary Norton	Independent	Resignation	2 January 2019	29 March 2019	Independent	Nicole McKay	63.61
Swan Hill	Murray-Mallee	Gary Norton	Independent	Resignation	2 January 2019	29 March 2019	Independent	Allen Ridgeway	36.39
Swan Hill	Robinvale	John Katis	Independent	Resignation	14 January 2019	29 March 2019	Ind. National	Jade Benham	N/A
Swan Hill	Robinvale	John Katis	Independent	Resignation	14 January 2019	29 March 2019	Elected unopposed		
Surf Coast	Anglesea	Libby Coker	Labor	Election to Australian Parliament	15 June 2019	30 August 2019	Independent	Tony Revell	62.24
Surf Coast	Anglesea	Libby Coker	Labor	Election to Australian Parliament	15 June 2019	30 August 2019	Independent	Harry Rosson	37.76
Moorabool	Woodlands	Pat Toohey	Independent	Death	19 September 2019	14 December 2019	Independent	Lawry Borgelt	50.10
Moorabool	Woodlands	Pat Toohey	Independent	Death	19 September 2019	14 December 2019	Independent	Ally Giofches	36.88
Strathbogie	Honeysuckle Creek	Kate Stothers	Independent	Resignation	24 December 2019	21 March 2020	Independent	Chris Raeburn	53.29
Strathbogie	Honeysuckle Creek	Kate Stothers	Independent	Resignation	24 December 2019	21 March 2020	Independent	Tom Maher	21.71
Corangamite	Central	Wayne Oakes	Independent	Death	19 April 2020	27 June 2020	Independent	Geraldine Conheadyn	57.85
Corangamite	Central	Wayne Oakes	Independent	Death	19 April 2020	27 June 2020	Independent	Michael Emerson	42.15

=== Countbacks ===
Council	Ward	Before		Change		After		
Council	Ward	Councillor	Party	Cause	Date	Date	Councillor	Party
Queenscliffe	Unsubdivided	Helene Cameron	Independent	Resignation	2 November 2016	21 November 2016	Bob Merriman	Independent
Melbourne	Unsubdivided	Brooke Wandin	Indigenous Voice On Council	Not eligible to stand	8 November 2016	14 March 2017	Nic Frances Gilley	Indigenous Voice On Council
East Gippsland	Unsubdivided	Linette Treasure	Independent	Resignation	16 January 2017	14 February 2017	Jackson Roberts	Independent
Casey	Mayfield	Rex Flannery	Independent	Resignation	8 March 2017	3 April 2017	Gary Rowe	Liberal
Melbourne	Unsubdivided	Michael Caiafa	Phil Cleary Means Business	Not duly elected	14 March 2017	14 March 2017	Susan Riley	Team Doyle
Whitehorse	Elgar	Tanya Tescher	Burwood Liberals	Resignation	3 April 2017	9 May 2017	Blair Barker	Burwood Liberals
Whittlesea	North	John Butler	Liberal	Death	6 September 2017	4 October 2017	Tom Joseph	Independent
Wangaratta	City	Ruth Amer	Independent	Death	5 October 2017	13 November 2017	Ashlee Fitzpatrick	Independent
Wellington	Northern	Keith Mills	Independent	Resignation	23 October 2017	15 November 2017	Carmel Ripper	Independent
Mount Alexander	Castlemaine	Tony Bell	Independent	Resignation	9 October 2017	22 November 2017	Dave Petrusma	Independent
Moreland	South	Samantha Ratnam	Greens	Elected to Victorian Parliament	11 October 2017	22 November 2017	Jess Dorney	Greens
Ararat	Unsubdivided	Paul Hooper	Independent	Resignation	1 November 2017	29 November 2017	Bill Braithwaite	Independent
Melbourne	Unsubdivided	Tessa Sullivan	Team Doyle	Resignation	15 December 2017	15 January 2018	Beverley Pinder-Mortimer	Team Doyle
Mount Alexander	Castlemaine	Robin Taylor	Independent	Resignation	13 February 2018	7 March 2018	Max Lesser	Independent
Ararat	Unsubdivided	Glenda McLean	Independent	Resignation	20 April 2018	21 May 2018	Fay Hull	Independent
Ararat	Unsubdivided	Darren Ford	Independent	Resignation	9 May 2018	6 June 2018	Frank Deutsch	Independent
Maroondah	Wyreena	Michael Macdonald	Independent	Resignation	25 June 2018	16 July 2018	Tasa Damante	Liberal
Pyrenees	Beaufort	Darren Ford	Independent	Resignation	9 May 2018	6 June 2018	Frank Deutsch	Independent
Colac Otway	Unsubdivided	Terry Woodcroft	Independent	Resignation	6 August 2018	27 August 2018	Brian Crook	Independent
South Gippsland	Tarwin Valley	Maxine Kiel	Independent	Resignation	26 September 2018	22 October 2018	Rosemary Cousin	Greens
Greater Bendigo	Whipstick	Julie Hoskin	Independent	Resignation	21 September 2018	23 October 2018	Malcolm Pethybridge	Independent
South Gippsland	Tarwin Valley	Meg Edwards	Liberal	Resignation	30 October 2018	5 November 2018	James Fawcett	Independent
Mildura	Unsubdivided	Max Thorburn	Independent	Death	18 October 2018	13 November 2018	Gavin Sedgmen	Independent Liberal
Dandenong	Paperbark	Meng Heang Tak	Labor	Elected to Victorian Parliament	27 November 2018	8 January 2019	Sophie Tan	Labor
Corangamite	Central	Bev McArthur	Liberal	Elected to Victorian Parliament	6 December 2018	18 December 2018	Wayne Oakes	Independent
Mildura	Unsubdivided	Ali Cupper	Independent	Elected to Victorian Parliament	7 December 2018	15 January 2019	Helen Healy	Independent
Maribyrnong	Stony Creek	Catherine Cumming	Justice	Elected to Victorian Parliament	11 December 2018	21 January 2019	Megan Bridger-Darling	Labor
Glen Eira	Tucker	Nina Taylor	Labor	Elected to Victorian Parliament	12 December 2018	9 January 2019	Anne-Marie Cade	Independent
Wodonga	Unsubdivided	Tim Quilty	Liberal Democrats	Elected to Victorian Parliament	12 December 2018	14 January 2019	Brian Mitchell	Independent
South Gippsland	Strzelecki	Lorraine Brunt	Independent	Resignation	28 February 2019	1 April 2019	Frank Hirst	Independent
South Gippsland	Tarwin Valley	James Fawcett	Independent	Resignation	28 February 2019	1 April 2019	No candidate declared elected	
South Gippsland	Tarwin Valley	N/A	N/A	No candidate declared elected	3 April 2019	8 April 2019	Steve Finlay	Independent
Yarra	Nicholls	Mike McEvoy	Greens	Resignation	3 April 2019	8 May 2019	Bridgid O'Brien	Victorian Socialists
South Gippsland	Coastal-Promontory	Jeremy Rich	Independent	Resignation after drug charges	22 April 2019	27 May 2019	Matthew Sherry	United Australia
Melton	Coburn	Melissa De Santis	Independent	Resignation	9 May 2019	12 June 2019	Yvonne Sebire	Independent
Surf Coast	Winchelsea	Carol McGregor	Independent	Resignation	3 June 2019	2 July 2019	James McIntyre	Independent
Buloke	Lower Avoca	John Shaw	Independent	Resignation	13 August 2019	17 September 2019	Bronwyn Simpson	Independent
Greater Bendigo	Whipstick	Yvonne Wrigglesworth	Independent	Resignation	12 September 2019	8 October 2019	Susie Hawke	Independent
Greater Dandenong	Paperback	Roz Blades	Labor	Resignation	12 October 2019	11 November 2019	Peter Brown	Independent
Queenscliffe	Unsubdivided	Tony Francis	Independent	Resignation	7 November 2019	2 December 2019	Robert Minty	Independent
Strathbogie	Lake Nagambie	Debra Bower	Independent	Resignation	17 December 2019	20 January 2020	Robert Gardner	Independent
Gannawarra	Patchell	Mark Arians	Independent	Resignation	3 February 2020	14 February 2020	Jenny Fawcett	Independent
Gannawarra	Yarran	Sonia Wright	Independent	Resignation	3 February 2020	2 March 2020	Andrew Gibbs	Independent
Warrnambool	Unsubdivided	Peter Hulin	Independent	Resignation	12 February 2020	11 March 2020	Peter Sycopoulis	Liberal
Casey	Springfield	Rex Flannery	Independent	Resignation	14 February 2020	Council sacked before countback		
Casey	Edrington	Timothy Jackson	Independent Labor	Resignation	14 February 2020	Council sacked before countback		
Brimbank	Grasslands	Lucinda Congreve	Independent	Resignation	1 March 2020	30 March 2020	Janev Aziz	Independent
Ararat	Unsubdivided	David Pettman	Independent	Resignation	3 April 2020	7 May 2020	Bernadine Atkinson	Independent
