= 2021 South Gippsland Shire Council election =

2021 Australian local government election

← 2016	5-29 October 2021	2024 →
- Turnout: 81.51%
	First party	Second party	Third party
	IND		IND
Party	Independent	Greens	Ind. Liberal
Last election	8 seats	0 seats	1 seat
Seats before	7	1	0
Seats won	9	0	1
Seat change	▲2	▼1	▲1
Popular vote	20,008	1,518	1,277
Percentage	92.95%	7.05%	5.93%

The 2021 South Gippsland Shire Council election was held in October 2021 to elect nine councillors for South Gippsland Shire, a local government area (LGA) in Victoria, Australia.

This was the first election for the council since it was dismissed by the sacked by the state government in June 2019, which resulted in its scheduled 2020 election being delayed by a year. The only elected candidate who had previously served on the council was Mohya Davies, who was elected in 2012 but defeated in 2016.

The Victorian Greens endorsed two candidates, while Liberal Party member Nathan Herseyn also contested the election. The local Labor Party branch expressed interest, but did not end up endorsing any candidates.

== Background ==
Following the 2016 election and up until the council was dismissed, five different councillors resigned.

Maxine Kiel (Tarwin Valley Ward) tendered her resignation on 26 September 2018, with Rosemary Cousin − who had joined the Greens that month after contesting as an independent in 2016 − elected as her replacement following a countback.

Liberal Party member Meg Edwards (Tarwin Valley Ward) resigned on 30 October, being replaced by independent James Fawcett the following month.

On 28 February 2019, both Fawcett and fellow councillor Lorraine Brunt (Strzelecki Ward) resigned. Brunt was replaced by Frank Hirst, however no candidate was initially declared elected as Fawcett's replacement at a 1 April countback, with Steve Finlay was elected a week later in a second countback.

Councillor Jeremy Rich (Coastal-Promontory Ward) resigned on 22 April after being charged with "cultivating and trafficking a commercial quantity of cannabis". He was replaced by United Australia Party member Matthew Sherry.

On 18 June 2019, the council was officially dismissed and three administrators appointed in place of elected councillors. A report into the council found there was "aggressive" councillor behaviour and suggested a "necessary" two-year break. As a result, South Gippsland was one of three LGAs without an election in October 2020.

== Campaign ==
In September 2021, campaigning for the election began. Some, including dismissed councillor James Fawcett and Gippsland South MP Danny O'Brien, called for former councillors not to contest.

Former mayor and councillor Don Hill, who decided to contest the election, was accused of using his newspaper, South Gippsland Voices, to promote his campaign.

The election was conducted entirely by post and voting began on 5 October. After a large proportion of ballot papers did not arrive by the 22 October deadline, the Victorian Electoral Commission extended the voting deadline by one week.

== Results ==
2021 South Gippsland Shire Council election
Party	Votes	%	Swing	Seats	Change
Independent	18,731	87.02		8	Steady
Greens	1,518	7.05		0	Steady
Independent Liberal	1,518	5.93		1	Steady
Formal votes	21,526	96.47			
Informal votes	788	3.53			
Total	22,314	100.0			
Registered voters / turnout	27,376	81.51			

=== Coastal-Promontory ===
2021 South Gippsland Shire Council election: Coastal-Promontory Ward
Party	Candidate	Votes	%	±%
Independent	Scott Rae	1,188	19.71	
Independent	Mohya Davies	1,113	18.47	
Independent	Sarah Gilligan	1,076	17.85	
Greens	Mat Morgan	798	13.24	
Independent	David Liebelt	771	12.79	
Independent	Sue Plowright	763	12.66	
Independent	Anda Banikos	318	5.28	
Total formal votes		6,027	97.40	
Informal votes		161	2.60	
Turnout		6,188	77.85	

=== Strzelecki ===
2021 South Gippsland Shire Council election: Strzelecki Ward
Party	Candidate	Votes	%	±%
Independent	Jenni Keerie	1,816	23.24	
Independent	Mick Felton	1,393	17.82	
Independent	Jim Forbes	1,299	16.62	
Independent Liberal	Nathan Hersey	1,277	16.34	
Independent	David Amor	1,003	12.83	
Independent	Frank Hirst	525	6.72	
Independent	Andrew McEwen	502	6.42	
Total formal votes		7,815	96.07	
Informal votes		320	3.93	
Turnout		8,135	82.51	

=== Tarwin Valley ===
2021 South Gippsland Shire Council election: Tarwin Valley Ward
Party	Candidate	Votes	%	±%
Independent	John Schelling	2,337	30.41	
Independent	Clare Williams	1,672	21.76	
Independent	Adrian Darakai	743	9.67	
Greens	Rosemary Cousin	720	9.37	
Independent	Don Hill	641	8.34	
Independent	Lindsay Love	423	5.50	
Independent	Jeremy Curtis	410	5.34	
Independent	Nicole Edwards-Galal	301	3.92	
Independent	Leslie John Harmer	294	3.83	
Independent	Andrew Corcoran	143	1.86	
Total formal votes		7,684	96.16	
Informal votes		307	3.84	
Turnout		7,991	83.53	

=== Change in composition ===
Ward	2016 election			Council before dismissal			2021 election			
Ward	Councillor		Party	Councillor		Party	Councillor		Party	
Ward	Coastal-Promontory		Alysson Skinner	Independent		Alysson Skinner	Independent		Scott Rae	Independent
	Coastal-Promontory	Ray Argento	Independent		Ray Argento	Independent		Mohya Davies	Independent	
	Coastal-Promontory	Jeremy Rich	Independent		Matthew Sherry	United Australia		Sarah Gilligan	Independent	
Strzelecki		Lorraine Brunt	Independent		Frank Hirst	Independent		Jenni Keerie	Independent	
Strzelecki		Andrew McEwen	Independent		Andrew McEwen	Independent		Mick Felton	Independent	
Strzelecki		Aaron Brown	Independent		Aaron Brown	Independent		Nathan Hersey	Ind. Liberal	
Tarwin Valley		Meg Edwards	Ind. Liberal		Steve Finlay	Independent		John Schelling	Independent	
Tarwin Valley		Don Hill	Independent		Don Hill	Independent		Clare Williams	Independent	
Tarwin Valley		Maxine Kiel	Independent		Rosemary Cousin	Greens		Adrian Darakai	Independent	
