= Karina Okotel =

Australian politician

Councillor of the City of Glen Eira for Rosstown Ward
- In office 27 October 2012 – 16 March 2016
- Preceded by: Steven Tang
- Succeeded by: Kelvin Ho

Personal details
- Party: Liberal (since 2010)

Karina Okotel (born 1980) is a former federal vice president of the Liberal Party. She was an unsuccessful Senate candidate for Victoria in the 2016 Australian federal election. She was one of the leaders of the unsuccessful "No" campaign in the Australian Marriage Law Postal Survey.

== Early life and education ==
Karina Okotel was born in 1980. She is of Sri Lankan descent and a daughter of Sri Lankan immigrants who worked menial jobs before becoming owners of a liquor store. She studied arts/law at Melbourne University and work variously as a solicitor and at the Barwon Community Legal Centre.

== Career and political activities ==
Okotel joined the Liberal Party in 2010 after the party's success at the Victorian state election. In 2012, she was elected as councillor for the Rosstown ward of the Glen Eira City Council, and later became deputy mayor. During 2016, she resigned from the Glen Eira Council to run for the Australian Senate. She was in the sixth place on the Liberal Party ticket and was unsuccessful. She was elected as federal Liberal Party vice-president in June 2017.

Since 2015, Okotel has been a leading opponent of legalising gay marriage in Australia. In September 2017, she decided to come out of maternity leave to support the Coalition for Marriage. She wrote an opinion piece for The Australian describing her fears for the freedom of speech, religion and association if same-sex marriage was legalised. On 12 September, she debated Christine Forster on ABC Radio National. On 13 September, she spoke at the National Press Club, alongside Lyle Shelton, for the campaign against same sex marriage. On 23 September, she was a panellist on the ABC Q&A same-sex marriage debate.

She served as Commonwealth Liberal Vice President until she was replaced by Teena McQueen in October 2019.

In August 2020, she was suspended from a senior Liberal party committee following concerns over a branch stacking scandal implicating close associate Marcus Bastian and MP Michael Sukkar and concerns she breached party rules compiling a dirt sheet on sitting MPs. Sukkar and MP Kevin Andrews were later cleared of using tax payer funds to recruit party members. The party's local government committee decided on the suspension of Okotel, just weeks after Ms Okotel was installed to the position, The Australian reported.

In 2020, Okotel had a falling out with Liberal Party powerbroker Marcus Bastiaan and has since been factionally linked with party president Robert Clark and former Opposition Leader Michael O'Brien.

Okotel was one of very few senior figures within the Victorian Liberal Party who supported the yes vote in the Indigenous Voice to Parliament referendum.

== Personal life ==
Okotel met her husband, David, a Ugandan, during her time working for Baptist World Aid. The pair went on to make a documentary about Uganda's internally displaced people and child soldiers. The couple married in Uganda in 2010 and have three children.
