= David Risstrom =

Australian barrister and former politician

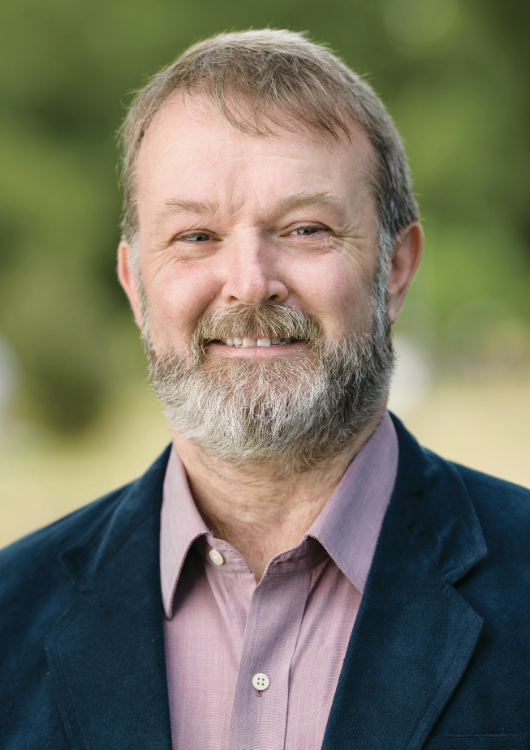
- Risstrom in 2019

Councillor of the City of Melbourne
- In office 20 March 1999 – 2004

Personal details
- Born: David Eric Risstrom; 1962/1963
- Party: Greens

David Eric Risstrom (born 1962 or 1963) is an Australian barrister and former politician. He was the first elected representative for the Victorian Greens.

== Early life ==
Risstrom is the son of Eric Risstrom (1930−2012), who served as a councillor on the City of Camberwell from 1961 to 1974 and from 1996 to 2003 on its successor, the City of Boroondara.

He educated at Wesley College Melbourne, the University of Melbourne (B.A.) and the Australian National University (B.Sc., LL.B.) before beginning his practice as a barrister.

== Political career ==
Risstrom was elected as a councillor on the City of Melbourne at the 1999 Victorian local elections having won 9% of the primary vote in a proportional representation system, becoming the first member of the Victorian Greens elected to public office. He was re-elected in 2001.

In 2004, Risstrom resigned as a councillor to contest the 2004 federal election in the Senate. He had won preselection as the lead Victorian Greens candidate, defeating future federal party leader Richard Di Natale. His candidacy was ultimately unsuccessful in controversial circumstances, after the Labor Party's group voting ticket preferences favoured the socially conservative Family First Party.

Risstrom nominated for preselection to contest the 2007 federal election as the Victorian Greens' candidate for the Senate, but was unsuccessful.

In February 2019, Risstrom was selected as the Greens candidate for the federal seat of Cooper, which replaced Batman, in the federal election later that year. He was subjected to internal scrutiny on eligibility resulting from the dual citizenship crisis in the Australian parliament. At the election, the Greens suffered a swing against them of more than 15% on first preferences and more than 13% on a two-candidate-preferred basis.

In November 2023, he again nominated for Victorian Greens Senate preselection following the retirement of Janet Rice, although was unsuccessful.
