= MoreArt =

MoreArt: art in public spaces
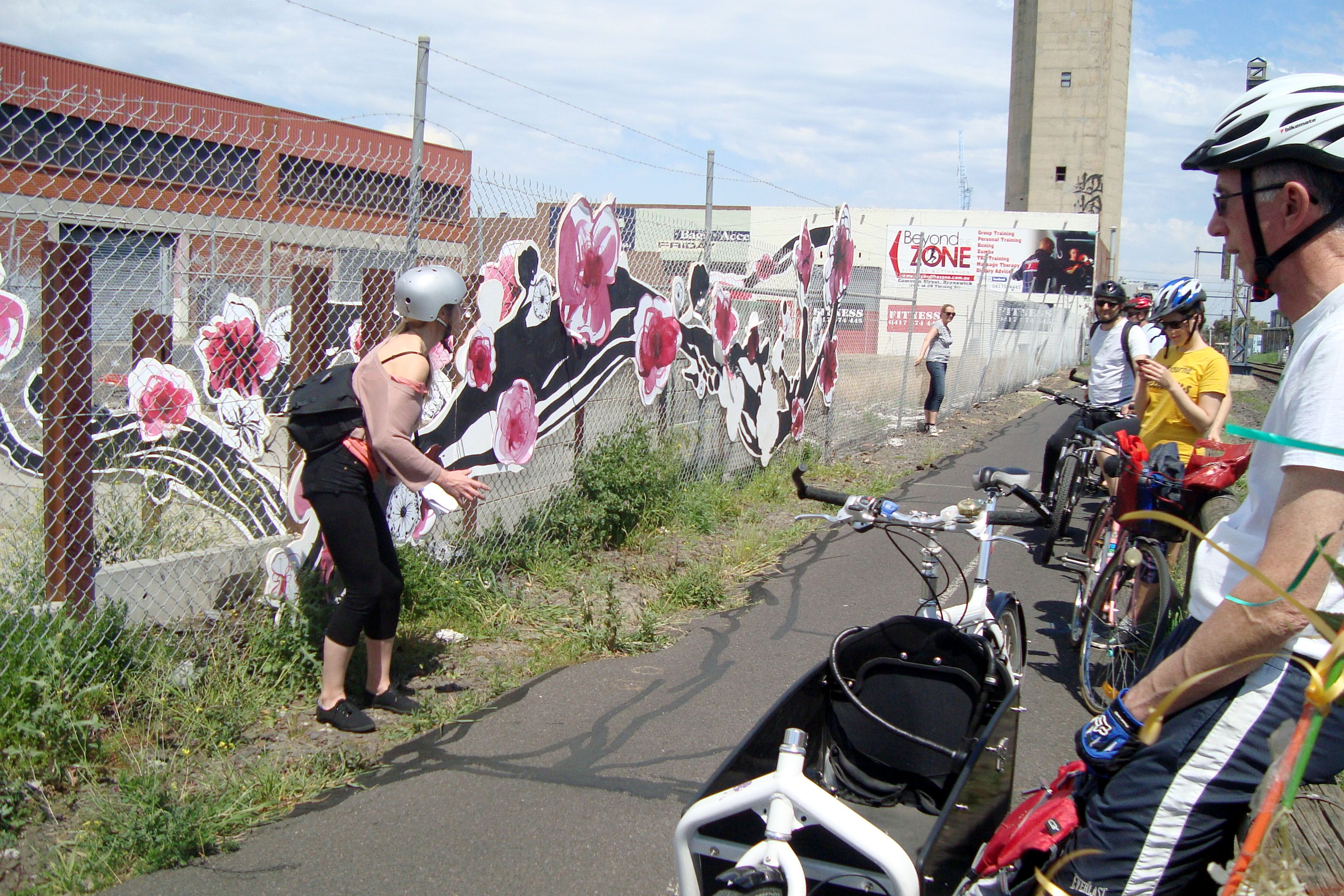
- Status: Active
- Genre: Public art show
- Date: October-December
- Frequency: Annual
- Venue: Public sites along the Upfield rail and bike precinct in Merri-bek.
- Location: Merri-bek
- Country: Australia
- Years active: 2010-
- Inaugurated: 2010
- Founder: Arts and Culture Unit - Merri-bek City Council
- Major events: Art, sculpture, audio, video
- Website: www.Merri-bek.vic.gov.au

MoreArt is an annual art in public spaces event along the Upfield Bike Path, the adjacent railway corridor and Sydney Road. Presented by the City of Merri-bek, the first event was held in 2010.

During the event, tours of the artworks and sculptures are undertaken by bicycle along the Upfield bike path, often with an opportunity for the cyclists to meet and engage with the artists. The works are located from Brunswick to Fawkner.

The event works:

"By encouraging artists to draw inspiration from and utilise disused public space, MoreArt both inserts art into those places already familiar – if hitherto invisible – to the local community, and invites both Merri-bek residents and others to subsequently discover – and perhaps better appreciate – the Merri-bek area while touring the MoreArt "exhibition".

Some artworks are located within the historic station buildings themselves and can include audio and video projections. Other locations include in front of the Brunswick Mechanics Institute and in Victoria Street Mall at Coburg.

In 2013 Koalas made from gray plastic bags by Coburg resident and artist Aaron James McGarry were tied up into eucalypt trees in Victoria Street Mall at Coburg. McGarry commented, "The idea was to use an iconic native animal. They're one of the many flora and fauna plastic bags have an impact on. It's an environmental piece that looks at our impact as consumers."

In 2016 Moreland City Councillor and Mayor Samantha Ratnam said that MoreArt is significant in helping to bring the community together and in enhancing the historic railway station buildings.

"Public art increases vibrancy and social cohesion in the community, economically it benefits the community by attracting more people, and importantly, by activating a space, it can change the perception of a space and the way it’s used," Councillor Ratnam said.
