= Glen Eira Town Hall =

Historic town hall in Victoria, Australia

Coordinates: 37.880204°S 145.022588°E

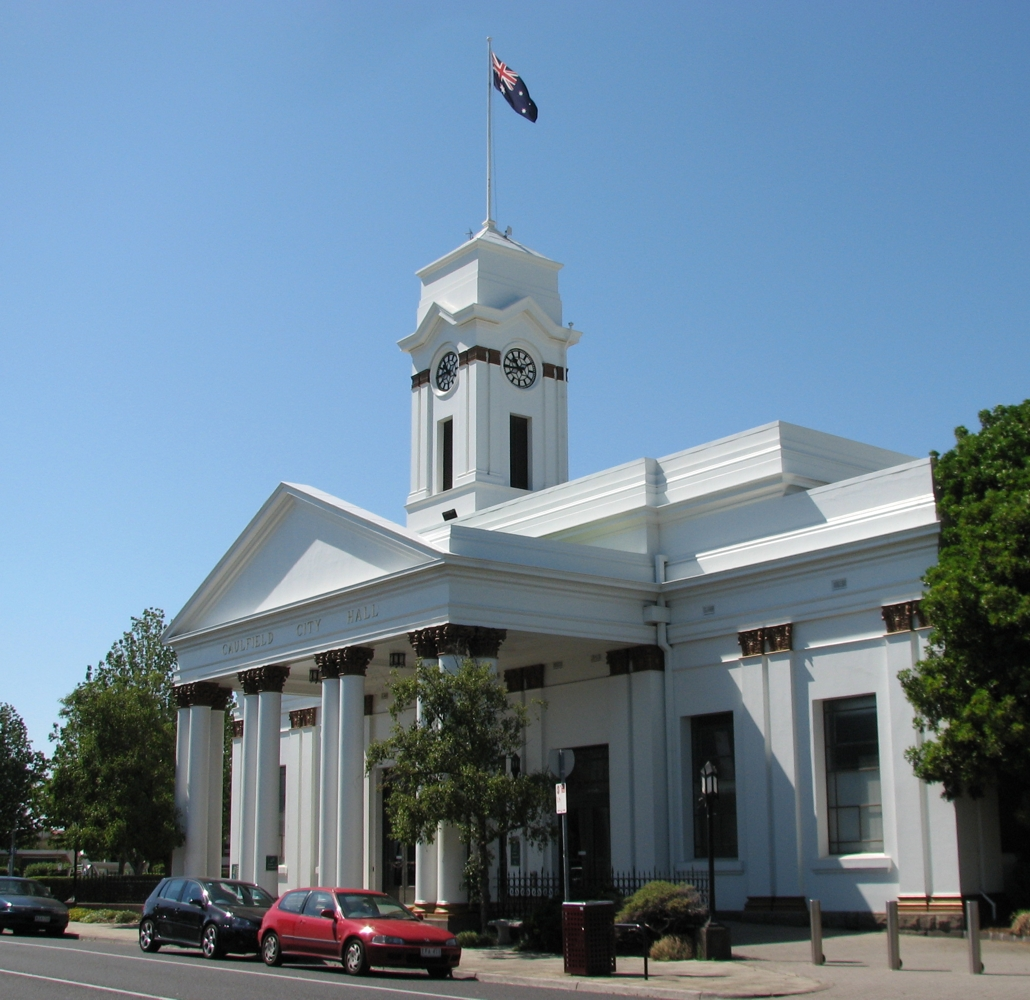
- Interactive map of the Glen Eira Town Hall area
- Former names: Caulfield Town Hall

General information
- Architectural style: Classical Revival
- Location: City of Glen Eira, Australia

Glen Eira Town Hall, known originally as Caulfield Town Hall, is located in Caulfield, Victoria, Australia. The hall was finished in 1890 and is a designated historic building with the Heritage Council of Victoria.
