= 2003 Victorian local elections =

Elections held in Australia in 2003

- 15 March 2003

	First party	Second party	Third party
	IND
Leader	N/A	N/A	N/A
Party	Independents	Labor	Liberal
Last election	(Note: This only includes the 54 councils up for election in 2002, not councillors in the remaining 25 councils.)
	Fourth party
Leader	No leader
Party	Greens
Last election

The 2003 Victorian local elections were held on 15 March 2003 to elect the councils of 54 of the 79 local government areas in Victoria, Australia.

Until 2008, local elections in Victoria were conducted periodically, meaning 25 councils were not up for election in 2003.
