= List of mayors of Merri-bek =

Mayor of Merri-bek
- Incumbent; Helen Davidson since 20 November 2024
- Appointer: Merri-bek City Council
- Term length: 1 year
- Inaugural holder: Mike Hill
- Formation: March 1996
- Deputy: Jay Iwasaki

This is a list of the mayors of the City of Merri-bek (known as the City of Moreland until September 2022), a local government area in Melbourne, Victoria, Australia, which was formed in 1994 by the amalgamation of the City of Brunswick, City of Coburg, and the southern part of the City of Broadmeadows.

The current mayor is Nat Abboud, who was voted into the position by councillors on 19 November 2025.

== Mayors ==
=== 1996–present ===
No.	Portrait	Mayor (Ward)	Party	Term start	Term end	Council control
1		Mike Hill (Hoffman)	Labor	March 1996	March 1997	Labor majority (1996–2012)
2		Rod Higgins (Lincoln Mills)	Labor	March 1997	March 1998	Labor majority (1996–2012)
3		Anthony Helou (Merri)	Labor	March 1998	March 1999	Labor majority (1996–2012)
4		Andrew Rowe (Moonah)	Labor	March 1999	March 2000	Labor majority (1996–2012)
5		Stella Kariofyllidis (Newlands)	Labor	March 2000	March 2001	Labor majority (1996–2012)
6		Robert Larocca (Glencairn)	Labor	March 2001	March 2002	Labor majority (1996–2012)
7		Joe Caputo (Hoffman)	Labor	March 2002	March 2003	Labor majority (1996–2012)
8		Joe Ficarra (Westbreen)	Labor	March 2003	March 2004	Labor majority (1996–2012)
(3)		Anthony Helou (Merri)	Labor	March 2004	November 2004 (Note: From 1996 until 2004, the annual election of the mayor for the following 12 months occurred in March. New legislation effective from 2004 onwards changed the date of the election of the mayor to November or December. There was a truncated transitional term of office from March to November 2004.)	Labor majority (1996–2012)
9		Mark Higginbotham (North-West)	Labor	November 2004	November 2005	Labor majority (1996–2012)
(3)		Anthony Helou (North-East)	Labor	November 2005	November 2006	Labor majority (1996–2012)
10		Mark O'Brien (North-East)	Labor	November 2006	November 2007	Labor majority (1996–2012)
(7)		Joe Caputo (South)	Labor	November 2007	November 2008	Labor majority (1996–2012)
11		Lambros Tapinos (South)	Labor	November 2008	November 2009	Labor majority (1996–2012)
(5)		Stella Kariofyllidis (North-East)	Labor	November 2009	November 2010	Labor majority (1996–2012)
12		Oscar Yildiz (North-West)	Labor	November 2010	November 2011	Labor majority (1996–2012)
13		John Kavanagh (North-West)	Democratic Labour	November 2011	November 2012	Labor majority (1996–2012)
(12)		Oscar Yildiz (North-West)	Labor	November 2012	November 2013	No overall control (2012–present)
(11)		Lambros Tapinos (South)	Labor	November 2013	November 2014	No overall control (2012–present)
14		Meghan Hopper (South)	Labor	November 2014	November 2015	No overall control (2012–present)
15		Samantha Ratnam (South)	Greens	November 2015	November 2016	No overall control (2012–present)
16		Helen Davidson (North-West)	Independent	November 2016	November 2017	No overall control (2012–present)
(13)		John Kavanagh (North-West)	Independent	November 2017	November 2018	No overall control (2012–present)
17		Natalie Abboud (North-East)	Greens	November 2018	November 2019	No overall control (2012–present)
(11)		Lambros Tapinos (South)	Labor	November 2019	November 2020	No overall control (2012–present)
18		Annalivia Carli Hannan (North-East)	Labor	November 2020	29 November 2021	No overall control (2012–present)
19		Mark Riley (South)	Greens	29 November 2021	29 November 2022	No overall control (2012–present)
20		Angelica Panopoulos (North-West)	Greens	29 November 2022	15 November 2023	No overall control (2012–present)
20		Adam Pulford (North-East)	Greens	15 November 2023	20 November 2024	No overall control (2012–present)
(16)		Helen Davidson (Djirri-Djirri)	Independent	20 November 2024	19 November 2025	No overall control (2012–present)
21		Nat Abboud (Pentridge)	Independent	19 November 2025	Incumbent	No overall control (2012–present)

== See also ==
- Local government areas of Victoria
