= 2020 Victorian local elections =

- 24 October 2020

	First party	Second party	Third party
	IND
Leader	N/A	N/A	N/A
Party	Independents	Greens	Labor
Last election		29 seats
Seats before		28
Seats won	566	36	13
Seat change		▲10
	Fourth party	Fifth party	Sixth party
	LDP	AJP	VS
Leader	No leader	No leader	No leader
Party	Liberal Democrats	Animal Justice	Socialists
Last election	1	0	Did not exist
Seats before	0	0	0
Seats won	2	2	1
Seat change	▲2	▲2	▲1
	Seventh party
	SAP
Leader	William Bourke
Party	Sustainable
Last election	0 seats
Seats before	1
Seats won	0
Seat change	▼1
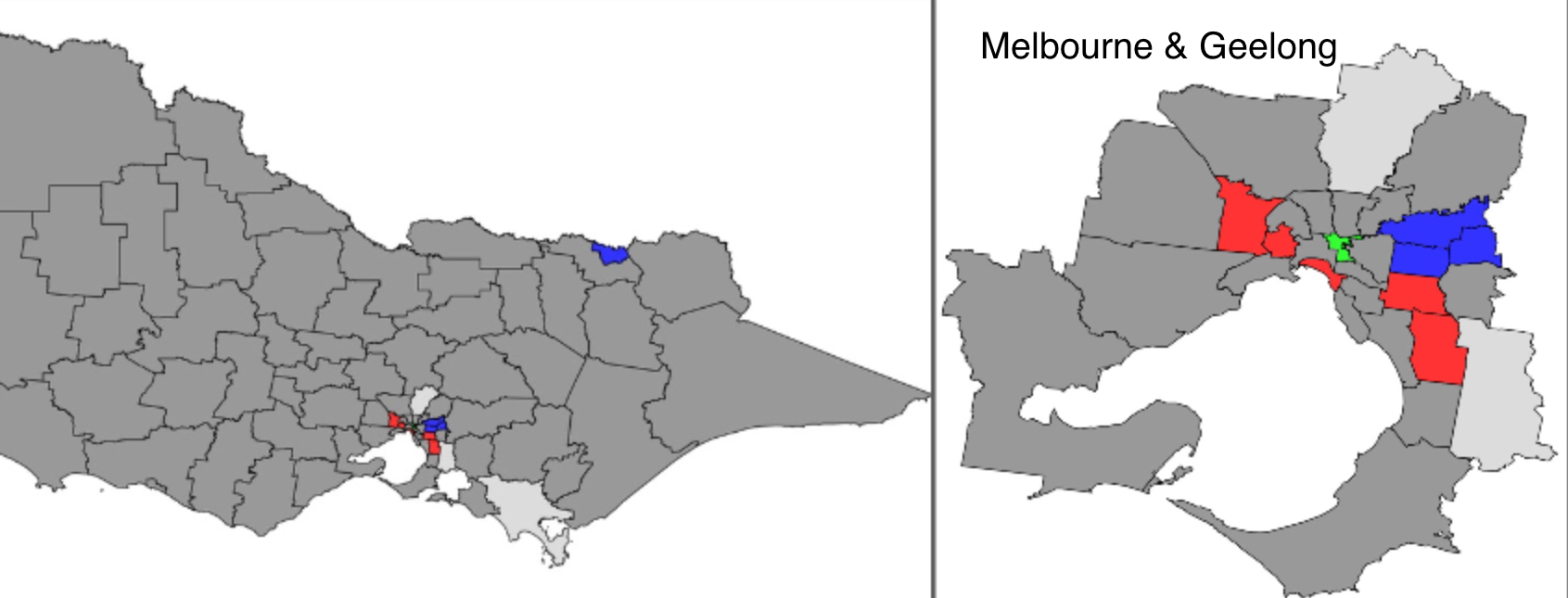
- Results by LGA

The 2020 Victorian local elections were held on 24 October 2020 to elect the councils of 76 of the 79 local government areas in Victoria, Australia.

Three councils did not hold elections − South Gippsland (dismissed in June 2019), Casey (dismissed in February 2020) and Whittlesea (dismissed in March 2020). An election for South Gippsland was held in October 2021, while Casey and Whittlesea did not have their elections until 2024.

== Background ==
The elections were held amid the COVID-19 Pandemic in Australia, with Melbourne still in lockdown at the time of the elections. A survey conducted in April 2020 showed that a significant majority of councils wanted the elections postponed for a year. However, Minister for Local Government Shaun Leane announced on 19 August that the elections would go ahead as scheduled.

Eight councils changed their electoral structure ahead of the election, moving to single-member wards as a result of the Local Government Act 2020:

- Bayside City Council
- Cardinia Shire Council
- Darebin City Council
- Greater Dandenong City Council
- Kingston City Council
- Manningham City Council
- Maroondah City Council
- Whitehorse City Council

Additionally, Swan Hill and Mansfield moved to an unsubdivided structure.

== Political parties ==
The Liberal Party does not endorse candidates for local elections in Victoria. Labor chose to endorse some candidates, and some local party branches also made their own endorsements. Australian Progressives co-founder Peter Wingate contested Yarraville Ward in Maribyrnong as the party's first ever local elections candidate.

Labor endorsed a total of 38 candidates in the following LGAs:

- Ballarat (6 candidates)
- Hobsons Bay (3 candidate)
- Maribyrnong (7 candidates)
- Melbourne (5 candidates)
- Moonee Valley (6 candidates)
- Moreland (5 candidates)
- Wodonga (1 candidate)
- Yarra (5 candidates)

Additionally, the Labor Members for Darebin group endorsed 10 candidates (later disendorsing one). The ALP distanced themselves from the group, saying they did not endorse any candidates in Darebin.

Six other VEC-registered parties endorsed candidates:

- The Greens (88 candidates)
- Victorian Socialists (19 candidates)
- Animal Justice Party (16 candidates)
- Liberal Democrats (10 candidates)
- Reason Party (7 candidates)
- Sustainable Australia Party (6 candidates)

The "Put Climate First" alliance endorsed candidates in Darebin, Greater Geelong and Surf Coast.

== Candidates ==
A total of 2,186 candidates contested the elections.

== Party changes before elections ==
A number of councillors joined or left parties before the 2020 elections.

Council	Ward	Councillor	Former party	New party	Date
Greater Dandenong	Silverleaf	Maria Sampey	Independent Labor	Labor	2017
Yarra	Langridge	Stephen Jolly	The Socialists	Independent Socialist	November 2017
Monash	Glen Waverley	Lynette Saloumi	Independent	Sustainable Australia	2018
Maribyrnong	Stony Creek	Catherine Cumming	Independent	Justice	2 February 2018
Yarra	Langridge	Stephen Jolly	Independent Socialist	Victorian Socialists	5 February 2018
Moreland	North-West	Oscar Yildiz	Labor	Independent	7 June 2018
Glenelg	Unsubdivided	Anita Rank	Independent Liberal	Independent National	8 June 2018
Darebin	Rucker	Kim Le Cerf	Greens	Independent	28 December 2018
Moyne	Unsubdivided	Jim Doukas	Country	Independent	Late 2018
Casey	Four Oaks	Rosalie Crestani	Rise Up Australia	Independent	26 June 2019
Yarra	Langridge	Stephen Jolly	Victorian Socialists	Independent Socialist	23 September 2019
Whittlesea	North	Emilia Sterjova	Labor	Independent	9 February 2020
Casey	Springfield	Sam Aziz	Liberal	Independent	16 February 2020

== Results ==
Party	Votes	%	Swing	Seats	Change
Independents				445	
Labor	80,639	2.44		13	
Independent Liberal				50	
Greens				36	▲10
Independent National				7	
Animal Justice				2	▲2
Liberal Democrats				2	▲1
Team Sally Capp	24,395	0.74		2	▲2
Victorian Socialists	20,210	0.61	+0.61	1	▲1
Team Arron Wood	12,187	0.37		1	▲1
Banyule Ratepayers Action Group	11,230	0.34		0	Steady
Ratepayers of Port Phillip	8,761	0.27	+0.27	2	▲2
Independent Socialist	7,380	0.22		2	▲2
Bring Back Melbourne	6,683	0.20		1	▲1
Back To Business	6,572	0.20		1	▲1
Sue Bolton Moreland Team	5,062	0.15		1	Steady
Socialist Alliance	4,262	0.13		0	
Save The Planet	2,934	0.09		0	Steady
Sustainable Australia	2,436	0.08		0	Steady
Richmond First	1,897	0.06		0	Steady
Morgan-Watts Team	1,541	0.05		0	▼1
Australia First	1,391	0.04		0	Steady
Residents First	1,110	0.03		0	Steady
Innovate Melbourne	817	0.02		0	Steady
Team Hakim	379	0.01		1	▲1
Melbourne - We All Matter	374	0.01		0	Steady
Independent Local Voice	351	0.01		0	Steady
Your Melbourne Team Get It Done	291	0.01		0	Steady
It Will Be Okay Melbourne	203	0.01		0	Steady
United People's Party	79	0.00		0	Steady
Put Climate First				1	▲1
Independent Labor				1	
Reason				0	Steady
Formal votes	3,298,665				
Informal votes					
Total					
Registered voters / turnout					

=== Council control ===
Party	Councils	
Party	Number	Change
Independent	66	
No overall control	7	
Burwood Liberals	1	
Dandenong Labor	1	
Greens	1	▲1

== Aftermath ==
Yarra City Council was described Australia's "most left-wing local government" with The Greens receiving a majority and two independent socialists, including Stephen Jolly, elected. However, Gabrielle de Vietri resigned after winning the seat of Richmond and was replaced via countback by independent Michael Glynatsis, ending the Greens majority.

In November 2021, Moreland councillor Oscar Yildiz was part of the formation of the Victorians Party, a centrist political party which planned to contest the 2022 state election. Along with Yildiz, fellow Moreland councillor Helen Pavlidis-Mihalakos and Melbourne councillor Philip Le Liu joined the party, giving it 3 local government seats. The party disbanded in August 2022, citing financial difficulties.

The United Australia Party gained Victorian local representation in Victoria in May 2022, when Swan Hill councillor Stuart King joined the party to contest Mallee at the federal election.

The City of Moreland was renamed to Merri-bek in September 2022.

Two minor parties, the Angry Victorians Party and Restore Democracy Sack Dan Andrews, gained councillors in 2023 via different countbacks.

=== Electoral fraud allegations ===
In February 2022, Labor councillor Milad El-Halabi resigned after being charged with conspiracy to cheat and defraud for allegedly tampering with the council elections in Moreland. He was replaced via countback in March 2022 by Socialist Alliance's Monica Harte.

On 31 March 2023, the Victorian Civil and Administrative Tribunal found that El-Halabi was unduly elected. He has denied all allegations.

=== Greens resignations ===
The Greens had five of its councillors resign from the party since the 2020 elections, and a further four seats have been lost due to resignations and deaths.

James Conlan (Merri-bek) left the party in solidarity with senator Lidia Thorpe, Amanda Stone (Yarra) resigned in February 2023, and Anab Mohamud (Yarra) resigned in February 2024.

In April 2024, both Greens councillors in Monash − Anjalee de Silva and Josh Fergeus − left the party.

== By-elections and countbacks ==
The Victorian Electoral Commission has held a number of by-elections and countbacks to fill vacancies on councils since the 2020 elections.

=== By-elections ===
Council	Ward	Before		Change		After		
Council	Ward	Councillor	Party	Cause	Date	Date	Councillor	Party
Northern Grampians	South West	N/A	N/A	No nominations at 2020 election	14 October 2020	4 December 2020	Trevor Gready	Independent
Hindmarsh	East	N/A	N/A	Only 1 nomination for 2 vacancies at 2020 election	21 October 2020	14 December 2020	Wendy Bywaters	Independent
Northern Grampians	Kara Kara	Karen Hyslop	Independent	Resignation	14 October 2020	1 March 2021	Eddy Ostarcevic	Independent
Cardinia	Westernport	Ray Brown	Independent	Death	19 March 2021	23 July 2021	Kaye Cameron	Independent
Yarra Ranges	Streeton	Cathrine Burnett-Wake	Liberal	Elected to Victorian Parliament	29 November 2021	18 February 2022	Andrew Fullaga	Independent
Maroondah	Wonga	Nora Lamont	Liberal	Resignation	7 December 2021	11 March 2022	Linda Hancock	Independent
Buloke	Mallee	Robert Priestly	Independent	Resignation	1 July 2022	28 October 2022	Bernadette Hogan	Ind. National
Northern Grampians	Kara Kara	Tony Driscoll	Independent	Death	1 August 2022	14 November 2022	Karen Hyslop	Independent
Mornington Peninsula	Watson	Paul Mercurio	Independent Labor	Elected to Victorian Parliament	21 December 2022	6 February 2023	Kate Roper	Independent
Maroondah	Barngeong	Marijke Graham	Independent	Resignation	8 September 2023	11 December 2023	Chris Jones	Independent
Greater Dandenong	Yarraman	Eden Foster	Dandenong Labor	Elected to Victorian Parliament	18 November 2023	9 March 2024	TBA	TBA

=== Countbacks ===
Council	Ward	Before		Change		After		
Council	Ward	Councillor	Party	Cause	Date	Date	Councillor	Party
Moira	Unsubdivided	Andrew Goldman	Independent	Death	3 December 2020	11 January 2021	Ed Cox	Independent
Mornington Peninsula	Nepean	Hugh Fraser	Independent	Resignation	9 March 2021	15 April 2021	Susan Bissinger	Independent
Wellington	Northern	Malcolm Hole	Independent	Death	10 April 2021	18 May 2021	Carmel Ripper	Independent
Baw Baw	West	Ben Lucas	Independent Liberal	Resignation	18 June 2021	29 June 2021	Keith Cook	Independent
Strathbogie	Lake Nagambie	Melanie Likos	Independent	Resignation	16 August 2021	16 September 2021	David Andrews	Independent
Moira	Unsubdivided	Kevin Bourke	Independent	Resignation	24 November 2021	15 December 2021	Judy Heather	Independent
Moira	Unsubdivided	Marie Martin	Independent	Resignation	7 December 2021	21 January 2022	John Beitzel	Independent
Alpine	Unsubdivided	Charlie Vincent	Animal Justice	Resignation	23 December 2021	20 January 2022	Simon Kelley	Independent
Mitchell	South	Christine Banks	Independent	Resignation	9 February 2022	11 March 2022	David Lowe	Independent
Moreland	North-West	Milad El-Halabi	Independent Labor	Resignation	10 February 2022	23 March 2022	Monica Harte	Socialist Alliance
Indigo	Unsubdivided	Jenny O'Connor	Independent	Resignation	21 February 2022	11 March 2022	Emmerick Teissl	Independent
Queenscliffe	Unsubdivided	Susan Salter	Independent Labor	Death	16 March 2022	13 April 2022	Isabelle Tolhurst	Independent
Mildura	Unsubdivided	Cyndi Power	Independent	Resignation	25 March 2022	21 April 2022	Troy Bailey	Independent
Wodonga	Unsubdivided	Kat Bennett	Independent	Resignation	4 April 2022	27 April 2022	Danny Lowe	Independent
Glen Eira	Rosstown	Neil Pilling	Independent	Resignation	11 April 2022	28 April 2022	Sue Pennicuik	Greens
Greater Shepparton	Unsubdivided	Robert Priestly	Independent	Resignation	15 June 2022	7 July 2022	Dinny Adem	Independent
Horsham	Unsubdivided	Di Bell	Independent	Resignation	12 August 2022	7 September 2022	Robert Redden	Liberal
Wodonga	Unsubdivided	John Watson	Independent	Resignation following cancer diagnosis	8 November 2022	6 December 2022	Danny Chamberlain	Independent Liberal
Moira	Unsubdivided	John Beitzel	Independent	Resignation	17 November 2022	6 December 2022	Scott Olson	Independent
Moira	Unsubdivided	Libro Mustica	Independent	Resignation	17 November 2022	12 December 2022	Wendy Buck	Independent
Yarra	Langridge	Gabrielle de Vietri	Greens	Elected to Victorian Parliament	9 December 2022	19 January 2023	Michael Glynatsis	Independent
Swan Hill	Unsubdivided	Jade Benham	Independent National	Elected to Victorian Parliament	13 December 2022	17 January 2023	Jacquie Kelly	Independent
Brimbank	Harvester	Trung Luu	Liberal	Elected to Victorian Parliament	21 December 2022	24 January 2023	Thomas O'Reilly	Independent
Colac Otway	Unsubdivided	Joe McCracken	Liberal	Elected to Victorian Parliament	21 December 2022	18 January 2023	Tosh-Jake Finnigan	Sack Dan Andrews
Greater Geelong	Brownbill	Sarah Mansfield	Greens	Elected to Victorian Parliament	21 December 2022	23 January 2023	Melissa Cadwell	Independent Labor
Melton	Watts	Moira Deeming	Liberal	Elected to Victorian Parliament	21 December 2022	23 January 2023	Justine Farrugia	Independent
Port Phillip	Lake	Katherine Copsey	Greens	Elected to Victorian Parliament	21 December 2022	17 January 2023	Robbie Nyaguy	Labor
Mornington Peninsula	Seawinds	Kerri McCafferty	Independent	Resignation	21 December 2022	6 February 2023	Simon Brooks	Independent
Stonnington	East	Alexander Lew	Liberal	Resignation	21 December 2022	19 January 2023	Joe Gianfriddo	Angry Victorians
Colac Otway	Unsubdivided	Jamie Bell	Independent	Resignation	7 February 2023	1 March 2023	Max Arnott	Independent
Southern Grampians	Unsubdivided	Greg McAdam	Independent	Resignation	13 April 2023	17 May 2023	Fran Malone	Independent
Baw Baw	Central	Joe Gauci	Independent	Resignation	27 April 2023	17 May 2023	Farhat Firdous	Independent
Queenscliffe	Unsubdivided	Fleur Hewitt	Independent	Resignation	29 May 2023	19 June 2023	Robert Minty	Independent
Greater Geelong	Windermere	Kylie Grzybek	Independent	Resignation	29 May 2023	28 June 2023	Sarah Hathway	Socialist Alliance
Strathbogie	Lake Nagambie	David Andrews	Independent	Resignation	27 June 2023	17 July 2023	Robin Weatherald	United Australia
Glenelg	Unsubdivided	Anita Rank	Independent National	Resignation	30 June 2023	7 August 2023	John Northcott	Independent
Indigo	Unsubdivided	Larry Goldsworthy	Independent	Resignation	3 July 2023	9 August 2023	Sue Gold	Independent
Greater Geelong	Bellarine	Stephanie Asher	Independent Liberal	Resignation	31 July 2023	31 August 2023	Elise Wilkinson	Put Climate First
Bass Coast	Western Port	Bruce Kent	Independent Liberal	Resignation	7 August 2023	11 August 2023	Geoff Ellis	Independent Labor
Glenelg	Unsubdivided	Jayden Smith	Independent	Resignation	19 October 2023	20 November 2023	Successful candidate did not confirm they are qualified	
Glenelg	Unsubdivided	N/A	N/A	No winner at previous countback	20 November 2023	22 November 2023	Successful candidate did not confirm they are qualified	
Glenelg	Unsubdivided	N/A	N/A	No winner at previous countback	22 November 2023	27 November 2023	Successful candidate did not confirm they are qualified	
Glen Eira	Camden	David Zyngier	Greens	Death	26 November 2023	8 January 2024	Jane Karslake	Independent Labor
Glenelg	Unsubdivided	N/A	N/A	No winner at previous countback	27 November 2023	5 December 2023	Robyn McDonald	Independent
Frankston	North-West	Steven Hughes	Independent	Resignation	11 December 2023	15 January 2024	Glenn Aitken	Independent
Maribyrnong	River	Sarah Carter	Labor	Death	7 August 2024	No countback held due to proximity of 2024 local elections		
