= 2005 Victorian local elections =

Local government election in Victoria

- 26 November 2005
- Turnout: 75.2%

	First party	Second party	Third party
	IND
Leader	N/A	N/A	N/A
Party	Independents	Labor	Liberal
Last election	(Note: This only includes the 54 councils up for election in 2005, not councillors in the remaining 25 councils.)
	Fourth party
Leader	No leader
Party	Greens
Last election	2
Seats won	5
Seat change	▲4
Popular vote	32,637

The 2005 Victorian local elections were held on 26 November 2005 to elect the councils of 54 of the 79 local government areas in Victoria, Australia.

These were the last local elections in Victoria that were conducted periodically, with changes to the Local Government Act 1989 seeing all 79 LGAs voting at the same time in 2008. 25 councils were not up for election in 2005.
