= 2001 Victorian local elections =

- 17 March 2001
- Registered: 181,108
- Turnout: 78.48%

	First party	Second party	Third party
	IND
Leader	N/A	N/A	N/A
Party	Independents	Labor	Liberal
Last election	(Note: This only includes the 3 councils up for election in 2001, not councillors in the remaining 75 councils.)
Seats won	23	2	2
Popular vote	118,987	8,718	8,578

The 2001 Victorian local elections were held on 17 March 2001 to elect the councils of 3 of the 78 local government areas in Victoria, Australia.

Elections occurred in the City of Greater Geelong, Borough of Queenscliffe and Surf Coast Shire. Queenscliffe and Surf Coast remained entirely independent-held, while Greater Geelong ended up under no overall control.

Until 2008, local elections in Victoria were conducted periodically, meaning 75 councils were not up for election in 2001.

== Results ==
=== Council votes ===
Party	Votes	%	Swing	Seats	Change
Independents	118,987	85.94		23	
Labor	8,718	6.30		2	
Liberal	8,578	6.20		2	
Independent Liberal	2,169	1.56		1	▲1
Total formal votes	138,452	97.42			
Informal votes	3,673	2.58			
Total	142,125	100.0		28	
Registered voters / Turnout	181,108	78.48			

== By-elections ==
Eight separate by-elections, the majority conducted by the Victorian Electoral Commission, were held for various LGAs throughout 2001.

Council	Ward	Before		Change		Result after preference distribution			
Council	Ward	Councillor	Party	Cause	Date	Date	Party	Candidate	%
Glenelg	Grant Riding					20 January 2001	Independent	Robert Halliday	55.24
Glenelg	Grant Riding					20 January 2001	Independent	Don Ward	44.76
Macedon Ranges	Campaspe					24 February 2001	Independent	Marty Evans	55.71
Macedon Ranges	Campaspe					24 February 2001	Independent	Ronda Walker	44.29
Moira	Unsubdivided					21 April 2001	Independent	Bary Franklin	N/A
Moira	Unsubdivided					21 April 2001	Elected unopposed		
Kingston	Patterson River					25 August 2001	Independent	Trevor Shewan	55.26
Kingston	Patterson River					25 August 2001	Independent	Jennifer Wilcox (Note: Second-placed out of three candidates as the by-election did not require full preference distribution.)	25.16
Yarra	Nicholson	Ray Thomas	Labor	Resignation	July 2001	6 October 2001	Greens	Gurm Sekhon	59.37
Yarra	Nicholson	Ray Thomas	Labor	Resignation	July 2001	6 October 2001	Labor	Magnus Beugelaar	40.63
Moreland	Hoffman	Andy Ingham	Independent	Death	22 July 2001	October 2001	Labor	Joe Caputo	
Maroondah	Clocktower					1 December 2001	Independent	Paul Denham	66.21
Maroondah	Clocktower					1 December 2001	Independent	Paul MacDonald	33.79
Greater Bendigo	Whipstick					15 December 2001	Independent	Julian Hood	55.71
Greater Bendigo	Whipstick					15 December 2001	Independent	Bob Hynes	44.29
