= 1999 Victorian local elections =

- 20 March 1999
- Turnout: 74.1%

	First party	Second party	Third party
	IND
Leader	N/A	N/A	N/A
Party	Independents	Labor	Liberal
	Fourth party
Leader	No leader
Party	Greens
Last election	0
Seats before	0
Seats won	1
Seat change	▲1

The 1999 Victorian local elections were held on 20 March 1999 to elect a number of the councils of the 78 local government areas in Victoria, Australia.

Until 2008, local elections in Victoria were conducted periodically, meaning a number councils were not up for election in 1999.

The Victorian Greens had their first electoral victory, with David Risstrom elected in the City of Melbourne having won 9% of the primary vote in a proportional representation system.
