= Socialist Alliance (Australia) =

Political party in Australia

- Abbreviation: SA; SocAll; The Alliance
- Co-Convenors: Jacob Andrewartha; Sue Bull; Sam Wainwright
- Founded: August 2001; 25 years ago
- Registered: 5 June 2007; 19 years ago
- Preceded by: Democratic Socialist Perspective
- Headquarters: Ultimo, Sydney, New South Wales
- Newspaper: Green Left
- Youth wing: Resistance: Young Socialist Alliance
- Membership (2021): ▲1,650 (electoral)
- Ideology: Eco-socialism; Anti-capitalism; Democratic socialism; Marxism
- Political position: Left-wing
- Colours: Red
- Slogan: "For the billions, not the billionaires!"
- House of Representatives: 0 / 151
- Senate: 0 / 76
- Merri-bek City Council: 1 / 11

Website
- Official website

Socialist Alliance (SA) is an Australian socialist political party and activist organisation. It was founded in 2001 as an alliance of various socialist organisations and activists, initiated by the Democratic Socialist Perspective and the International Socialist Organisation.

Engaging in a combination of grassroots activism and electoral politics, as of February 2024 Socialist Alliance has one elected officeholder in Australia, Sue Bolton in the City of Merri-bek.

The party is involved with the trade union, environmentalist and student movements in Australia. It takes strong left-wing stances on numerous issues, including refugee rights, Aboriginal and Torres Strait Islander rights, anti-racism, and public ownership. Socialist Alliance also proposes nationalising the banking, energy and mining sectors. On workers' rights, the party supports raising the minimum wage, implementing wage theft and industrial manslaughter laws, increasing trade union bargaining to industry-wide status and reducing the working week to 30 hours. It opposes the building of new coalmines and any attempts to privatise public services such as Medicare. The party supports expansion of the public healthcare system to cover dental services and the cessation of public funding to private schools. Policies of state branches include support for public housing, public transport, public education and publicly owned utilities, as well as advocating for less militarised and hard-line policing and justice systems.

The party participated within the Victorian Socialists electoral alliance in Victoria, until it withdrew from it in May 2020.

== History ==
=== Formation and growth ===
Socialist Alliance was founded in 2001 as a loose alliance of socialist organisations and individuals. The project was initiated by the Democratic Socialist Perspective and the International Socialist Organisation. Seven other organisations were included in the initial exploratory meeting: the Freedom Socialist Party, Socialist Alternative, Socialist Democracy, Worker-communist Party of Iraq, Workers League, Worker's Liberty, and Worker's Power. The aim of the merger was to create greater left unity in the aftermath of the S11 protests of the World Economic Forum in Melbourne on 11–13 September 2000.

Many non-aligned socialists were attracted by the idea of left unity, and soon after its formation Socialist Alliance grew to a point where a majority of its members were not members of any of the affiliate organisations.

=== Debate on form ===
In response to this growth, the Democratic Socialist Perspective and many non-aligned members won a majority at successive national conferences for measures that would move Socialist Alliance in the direction of becoming a united socialist party, rather than simply an alliance of groups and individuals.

Most of the affiliate organisations, however, in particular the International Socialist Organisation, preferred to keep Socialist Alliance as a broad left-wing electoral front for socialist organisations and individuals.

In late 2003, the Democratic Socialist Party resolved to become "a Marxist tendency in the Socialist Alliance", renaming itself the "Democratic Socialist Perspective" as a step towards turning the Socialist Alliance into a "Multi-Tendency Socialist Party". This move was supported by some 75% of conference delegates at Socialist Alliance's national conference that year, although other affiliates remained opposed.

The 2005 National Conference saw the emergence of a number of particularly sharp political differences. These centred on: the extent to which Socialist Alliance should criticise the Australian Labor Party; whether the organisation should have a formal relationship with the newspaper associated with the Democratic Socialist perspective, Green Left Weekly, as a step towards Socialist Alliance itself having its own newspaper; and whether non-aligned members should have an automatic majority on the organisation's national executive.

=== Mergers and withdrawals ===
Following this conference three of the leading members of a "Non-Aligned Caucus" and most of the active affiliate organisations gradually withdrew from the Socialist Alliance. The "Non Aligned Caucus" was an ad hoc grouping of members who weren't aligned to any affiliated organisation which formed in the lead up to the 2003 national conference.

In 2006, Workers Power left the Alliance. In 2007, the International Socialist Organisation also left.

In January 2010, the Democratic Socialist Perspective voted to merge into the Socialist Alliance, in effect ceasing to exist as an affiliate organisation.

In September 2012 the Socialist Alliance initiated unity discussions with Socialist Alternative. At the time, Socialist Alternative were in unity discussions with the Revolutionary Socialist Party which led to a merger in early 2013.

After approximately a year of leadership discussions, joint forums and participation by Socialist Alliance at Socialist Alternative's Marxism conference, the Socialist Alternative leadership publicly announced that they were pulling out unity discussions in November 2013, but remained open to ongoing collaboration. Socialist Alternative claimed the Socialist Alliance's approach to a transitional program and electoral politics was "not sufficiently similar to carry through a sustained and productive unity."

While the Socialist Alliance welcomed the opportunity for ongoing collaboration, it was critical of Socialist Alternative's reasons for withdrawal. Leading Socialist Alliance member Dave Holmes accused the Socialist Alternative of "sticking with its very narrow, propagandist view of socialist politics" rather than seeking to unite to appeal to socialists more broadly. The Socialist Alliance published the full correspondence on the unity discussions in its discussion bulletin, Alliance Voices.

At its national conference in 2014, the socialist youth organisation Resistance voted to merge with the Socialist Alliance and become its official youth organisation. The new organisation renamed itself Resistance: Young Socialist Alliance.

Resistance elects its own leadership body to coordinate the party's youth work and organise its youth conference, Radical Ideas.

=== Victorian Socialists ===
On 5 February 2018, it was announced that Socialist Alliance, the Socialist Alternative, community activists and trade unionists would work together to form an electoral alliance named the Victorian Socialists in order to contest the 2018 Victorian state election. The leading candidates for the Northern Metropolitan Region included Yarra councillor Stephen Jolly, and also featured Moreland councillor Sue Bolton (Socialist Alliance) and asbestos lawyer Colleen Bolger (Socialist Alternative). Socialist Alliance's Tim Gooden, former Geelong Trades Hall Secretary and CFMEU organiser, led the ticket for the Western Victoria Region. Although the party gained 4.6% of the vote, the highest of any minor party in the Northern Metropolitan Region, it failed to win a seat following preference deals.

The Victorian Socialists ran candidates in the electorates of Calwell, Wills, and Cooper during the 2019 federal election, gaining 4.6%, 4.5%, and 4.2% of the vote respectively.

In 2020 Socialist Alliance withdrew from Victorian Socialists.

== Branches and membership numbers ==
In addition to having branches in major capital cities Sydney, Melbourne, Brisbane, Perth, Adelaide, Canberra, and Hobart, the Socialist Alliance also maintains branches in and around a number of minor cities and regional areas, including in the Blue Mountains, Cairns, Geelong, Illawarra, New England and Newcastle. The Socialist Alliance also has individual members spread across rural and regional Australia.

A branch in Fremantle existed, it included a branch office and a library.

The Socialist Alliance is a registered political party at a federal level, and annually maintains electoral registration in New South Wales and in Victoria.

Federal registration requires 1,500 members, Victorian registration also requires 500 members in Victoria, and 750 members are needed for NSW registration.

These figures reflect electorally registered members, however, and may not be an accurate measure of active or financial membership. A Socialist Alliance Perspectives resolution published in Alliance Voices in February 2012, suggests a membership figure of approximately 600.

Socialist Alliance members are generally organised in branches of at least 7 voting members who "...must pay an annual membership fee.", however the party Constitution allows for "at large" members living in areas with no nearby branch structure to join.

== Publications ==
Socialist Alliance's policy and constitution can be found on its website.

The newspaper Green Left Weekly – which is politically associated with the Socialist Alliance – runs a weekly Socialist Alliance column called "Our Common Cause". The Socialist Alliance also has a close working relationship with Links – International Journal of Socialist Renewal. The Brisbane local newspaper The Westender has also run a column written by the Socialist Alliance, and its members have been published on sites such as ABC's The Drum and Online Opinion.

For around one year the Socialist Alliance published a quarterly journal, Seeing Red, the final issue of which came out in March 2006.

The Socialist Alliance and its members have also published a large number of pamphlets and books, primarily through Resistance Books, on a range of historical, political and social justice issues.

Before Green Left's website became the dominant means by which Socialist Alliance published written material online, they maintained a variety of blogs. Their internal discussion bulletin and national newsletter 'Alliance Voices' was maintained until 2014. Their West Australian branch maintained a blog until 2016. Socialist Alliance local councillors Sam Wainwright and Sue Bolton maintained individual websites until 2009 and 2013 respectively.

== Grassroots campaigning ==
While Socialist Alliance, its affiliates and non-aligned members continue to put forward and argue for socialist politics in the electoral arena, the organisation places a stronger emphasis on building successful grassroots campaigns as a way of promoting socialist politics. In the recent unity discussions with Socialist Alternative, the Socialist Alliance re-emphasised its support for this "transitional method" towards campaigns, arguing that campaign work is key to leading people to understanding the need to transform the whole capitalist system.

Socialist Alliance has been involved in a broad range of campaigns since its formation, reflecting both its own developing political orientation, as well as the activities and politics of its affiliates. These include in trade union movement, education, and environmentalist movements, as well as numerous other grass roots campaigns including refugee rights, same-sex marriage rights, Aboriginal and Torres Strait Islander rights, climate change, and international solidarity with movements such as the Palestinian struggle for national self-determination, the Rojava revolution and the Bolivarian Revolution in Latin America, and social-justice and pro-democracy movements in South East Asia.

=== Industrial ===
Socialist Alliance places great importance on strengthening the union movement, with members active in a range of unions including, amongst others, the Australian Services Union, the Australian Education Union, the Australian Manufacturing Workers Union, the Australian Nursing Federation, the Community and Public Sector Union, the Construction, Forestry, Mining and Energy Union, the Electrical Trades Union, the Finance Sector Union, the National Tertiary Education Union, the National Union of Workers, the New South Wales Teachers Federation, the Rail, Tram and Bus Industry Union, the Transport Workers Union and United Voice.

In line with its criticism that the ALP is holding back and bureaucratising the union movement, Socialist Alliance encourages workers and unions to become independent of the ALP, to strengthen democracy in the unions and to set up a "new workers' party". However, it also works alongside rank-and-file union members on industrial campaigns, regardless of political affiliation.

In 2005 and 2006, the Socialist Alliance initiated and helped organise trade union "fight-back" conferences, in response to the Federal Government's "WorkChoices" legislation, attracting hundreds of union militants and members of other socialist groups. The Socialist Alliance was involved in the Your Rights at Work campaign against WorkChoices that followed, as well as the campaign to abolish the Australian Building and Construction Commission (ABCC).

Socialist Alliance has been highly critical of the Australian Labor Party's industrial policy for not returning enough rights to workers and for retaining the ABCC, describing the Rudd government's Fair Work Australia as little more than "WorkChoices-lite".

Notable Socialist Alliance trade union leaders have included Chris Cain, Western Australian State Secretary of the Maritime Union of Australia; Tim Gooden, former secretary of the Geelong Trades and Labour Council; and Craig Johnston, former Victorian State Secretary of the Australian Manufacturing Workers Union, who was jailed for 9 months in 2004 after an industrial dispute at Johnson Tiles in 2001.

=== Anti-war and civil liberties ===
Socialist Alliance is opposed to US and Australian military interventions such as the invasions of Afghanistan and Iraq. Socialist Alliance, its affiliates and members played a central role in the campaigns against these wars in 2001 and 2003. Socialist Alliance also played a leading role in founding the Stop the War Coalition in a number of cities, and organising protests in the years that followed.

Socialist Alliance members are also active in promoting the Boycott, Divestment and Sanctions campaign against Israel.

Socialist Alliance opposes the "war on terror", claiming that it leads to increased racism against Arab and Muslim communities, and to government policies that threaten civil liberties. Socialist Alliance members were central to organising the protests in Sydney against APEC in 2007, and the visit of Pope Benedict XVI in 2008, in the face of increased police powers that were heavily criticised for violating civil liberties.

The party conducts this work alongside other activist and community groups as well as individual activists in broader coalitions like the Stop the War Coalition, and the Gaza Defence Committee.

=== The environment ===
Socialist Alliance is involved in a variety of campaigns around environmental issues, most notably climate change, helping to organise the 2006 Walk Against Warming rallies in some cities, and producing detailed policies on combating climate change which have been created through an open wiki process with broad membership input. Since the 2007 Federal Election, the environmental website VoteClimate has rated Socialist Alliance environmental policy number 1 (ahead of the Greens).

Socialist Alliance members also helped to organise the Climate Action Summit in Canberra on 31 January – 1 February 2009, and is involved in building the new national Climate Action Network that grew out of that summit.

Socialist Alliance argues that no solution to the crisis caused by global warming is possible without overthrowing capitalism, and criticises market mechanisms such as carbon trading as being unworkable, profit-driven and reinforcing the capitalist relations that it alleges caused the pollution to begin with.

=== Indigenous rights ===
Socialist Alliance has played a role in recent campaigns for justice for indigenous Australians, particularly around the inquiries into the deaths-in-custody of TJ Hickey in Redfern and Mulrunji Doomadgee on Palm Island. In the case of Mulrunji, leading indigenous activist, academic and Socialist Alliance member Sam Watson played a key role in organising the protests that led to the re-opening of the inquiry.

Socialist Alliance also opposes the Federal Government's Northern Territory intervention, and helped to organise the 12 February 2008 protests outside Parliament House in Canberra.

=== Anti-racism and immigrants rights ===
Socialist Alliance has been able to build growing support among some ethnic community sectors in urban Australia such as among Somali youth, the Tamil community and from within the Latin American community. In the latter case, the Socialist Alliance has been an active supporter of the Bolivarian Revolution in Venezuela and is affiliated to the Australia Venezuela Solidarity Network.

Socialist Alliance members have also been involved in the struggle for refugee rights, opposing mandatory detention of illegal immigrants, and calling for Australia to pursue a more humane policy on refugees.

=== Public services ===
Socialist Alliance advocate the provision of quality public services by all levels of government, calling for increased funding in public education, healthcare, housing and transport. They also advocate expanding the public sector with the nationalisation of large multinational corporations. Furthermore, the party calls for capitalist enterprises that have received taxpayer-subsidies to either repay their subsidies back to the taxpayers in full or be nationalised without compensation.

Socialist Alliance is involved in campaigns against privatisation like those planned by the New South Wales Government (for example electricity and prisons), alongside the Greens, unions, ALP members and community groups. They maintain that all privatisations must be reversed with nationalisation.

=== Social justice ===
Socialist Alliance is also active in a number of other social justice campaigns, including LGBTI rights, women's liberation, welfare rights, and prison reform, as well as around local issues. After an editorial by OUTinPerth accusing socialists of taking over the movement for equal marriage rights, prominent LGBTIQ campaigner and Socialist Alliance member Farida Iqbal issued a reply arguing that the Socialist Alliance and others had played a prominent role in the Australian movement for marriage equality since it began in 2004.

=== International solidarity ===
The party also places a large emphasis on international socialist solidarity. It is actively involved in supporting many left-wing movements around the world, such as those relating to Venezuela and the Bolivarian Revolution in Latin America, Palestinian resistance, Kurdish self-determination in North Syria. Socialist Alliance also actively campaigns in solidarity with international pro-democracy movements as far ranging as Latin America, the Middle East, Western Sahara, Zimbabwe, South East Asia, and elsewhere.

== Election results ==
While the Socialist Alliance participates in elections, standing candidates at a range of levels, it does not see electoral politics as the most important vehicle for building socialism. Rather, it sees its participation in elections not as a way "to "represent" people's movements, but as a way to strengthen them and help them win their demands". Socialist Alliance candidates also pledge to take only an average wage if elected, donating the remainder into the social movements.

=== Federal ===
The Socialist Alliance first campaigned in the 2001 federal election, however, candidates were listed as independents on the ballot as its application for electoral registration was suspended when the election was called early.

At the 2022 federal election, Socialist Alliance candidate Pat O'Shane polled slightly over 4 percent of the vote in the Division of Leichhardt, the best result the party received both at that election and in any federal election outside the state of Victoria. O'Shane had a particularly strong performance at some remote booths on the Cape York Peninsula.

House of Representatives
Election year	# of overall votes	% of overall vote	Notes
2004	14,155	0.12	
2007	9,973	0.08	
2010	9,348	0.08	
2013	5,032	0.04	
2016	3,653	0.03	
2019	2,447	0.02	Outside Victoria running under Socialist Alliance.
2019	12,454	0.09	Running under Victorian Socialists.
2022	11,971	0.08	
2025	16,119	0.12	

Senate
Election year	# of overall votes	% of overall vote	Notes
2004	13,305	0.11	
2007	9,525	0.08	
2010	32,580	0.26	
2013	2,728	0.02	
2016	9,968	0.07	
2019	7,905	0.05	
2022	28,057	0.19	
2025	37,482	0.23	

=== State ===
==== New South Wales ====
New South Wales Legislative Assembly
Election year	# of overall votes	% of overall vote
2007	1,257	0.00
2011	3,180	0.08
2015	1,295	0.03
2019	1,208	0.03
2023	1,464	0.03
New South Wales Legislative Council
Election year	# of overall votes	% of overall vote
2003	5,428	0.15
2007	15,142	0.40
2011	9,770	0.26
2015	8,489	0.18
2019	13,194	0.32
2023	17,056	0.37

==== Victoria ====
The Socialist Alliance first ran in the 2002 Victorian state election, securing 3,274 votes or 0.11% of the vote. In 2006, the party's vote dropped to 1,102 or 0.04%. In 2010 the party won 1,787 votes, or 0.06%. The results were stable for the next election in 2014 at 1,728 votes, 0.05% of the vote. For the 2018 election, the Socialist Alliance ran as part of the Victorian Socialists, which won 15,442 votes (0.44%) in the Legislative Assembly and 32,603 votes (0.91%) in the Legislative Council.

=== Council ===
In the 2004 Victorian local government elections, Socialist Alliance did relatively well in two councils in Melbourne. In the Moreland City Council elections, two candidates exceeded 4%. In the election in the Boroondara City Council, a Socialist Alliance candidate won over 12% of the vote (in the absence of an Australian Labor Party-endorsed candidate) in Cotham ward.

The 2008 Victorian local government election results were also positive. The Socialist Alliance polled almost 19% in the Stoney Creek ward of the Melbourne municipality of Maribyrnong and polled over 10% in all wards bar one that it contested across the state.

In October 2009 the Socialist Alliance won its first election when Sam Wainwright was elected for the Hilton Ward of the Fremantle City Council. In October 2013, Sam Wainwright was re-elected to Fremantle's Hilton Ward with an outright majority of 58.33%.

In October 2012 The Socialist Alliance won its second election when Sue Bolton was elected to Moreland City Council in Melbourne's northern suburbs. Merri-bek Council (renamed from Moreland in 2022) gained a second Socialist Alliance councillor in March 2022 when Monica Harte was elected on a countback to replace Labor councillor Milad El-Halabi.

Bolton, Harte, and Wainwright, along with Stephen Jolly in Yarra City Council and the Victorian Socialists' Owen Cosgriff in Greater Bendigo City Council, are currently the only politicians in Australia elected on an explicitly socialist platform.

== Elected representatives ==
=== Current ===
Image	Name	Office	Term start	Term end	Notes
	Sue Bolton	Councillor of the City of Merri-bek for Bababi Djinanang Ward	27 October 2012	Incumbent	Councillor for North-East Ward until 2024

=== Former ===
Image	Name	Office	Term start	Term end	Notes
	Sam Wainwright	Councillor of the City of Fremantle for Hilton Ward	17 October 2009	16 October 2021	Retired
	Monica Harte	Councillor of the City of Merri-bek for North-West Ward	23 March 2022	26 October 2024	Elected after countback. Retired
	Sarah Hathway	Councillor of the City of Greater Geelong for Windermere Ward	28 June 2023	26 October 2024	Elected after countback. Contested Corio Ward in 2024 after Windermere Ward abolished but lost seat

== See also ==
- Socialism in Australia
- Victorian Socialists – an electoral coalition between Socialist Alliance, Socialist Alternative, trade unionists and community activists
