= 2012 Victorian local elections =

- 27 October 2012

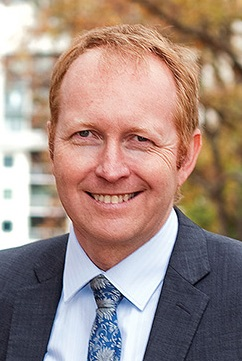
	First party	Second party	Third party
	IND
Leader	N/A	N/A	N/A
Party	Independents	Labor	Liberal
	Fourth party	Fifth party	Sixth party
		SOC	SA
Leader	Greg Barber	No leader	No leader
Party	Greens	Socialist	Socialist Alliance
Last election		1	1 seat
Seats before		2	1
Seats won	18	1	1
Seat change		▼1	Steady
	Seventh party	Eighth party	Ninth party
	RUAP	SAP	CA
Leader	None	William Bourke	Russell Bate
Party	Rise Up	Sustainable	Country Alliance
Last election	Did not exist	Did not exist	Did not contest
Seats before	0	1	0
Seats won	1	0	1
Seat change	▲1	▼1	▲1

The 2012 Victorian local elections were held on 27 October 2012 to elect the councils of 78 of the 79 local government areas in Victoria, Australia. Several councils also held mayoral elections.

The elections saw Country Alliance win their first-ever elected representative, with party co-founder Russell Bate winning unopposed in Mansfield.

Additionally, Socialist Alliance won their second-ever councillor and their first in Victoria, with Sue Bolton elected in Moreland.

== Party changes before elections ==
A number of councillors joined or left parties before the 2012 elections.

Council	Ward	Councillor	Former party	New party	Date
Bayside	Northern	Clifford Hayes	Independent	Sustainable Australia	2010
