= 2008 Victorian local elections =

Election in Victoria

- 29 November 2008

The 2008 Victorian local elections were held on 29 November 2008 to elect the councils of the 79 local government areas in Victoria, Australia.

As a result of changes to the Local Government Act 1989, local elections in Victoria were no longer conducted periodically, and all 79 LGAs voted at the same time.

The elections saw the first election victories for The Greens in Casey, Darebin, Glen Eira, Manningham, Queenscliffe and Surf Coast.

Labor Party-endorsed candidates ran in Maribyrnong, while former Liberal leader Robert Doyle was elected Lord Mayor of Melbourne on the Activate Melbourne ticket.

== Aftermath ==
Three Greens councillors were elected mayor by a vote of other councillors following the elections: Amanda Stone (Yarra), Philip Schier (Mount Alexander) and Helen Harris (Whitehorse).

In May 2010, three Labor councillors in Moreland − Stella Kariofyllidis, Kathleen Matthews-Ward and Alice Pryor − were suspended from the party after not voting for Labor's Enver Erdogan to become mayor. Kariofyllidis was suspended for three years, while the others were suspended for two years.
