= Results of the 2024 Victorian local elections =

← 2020	26 October 2024	2028 →

This is a list of results for the 2024 Victorian local elections.

== Results by LGA ==
- Results of the 2024 Victorian local elections in Barwon South West
- Results of the 2024 Victorian local elections in Eastern Melbourne
- Results of the 2024 Victorian local elections in Gippsland
- Results of the 2024 Victorian local elections in Grampians
- Results of the 2024 Victorian local elections in Hume
- Results of the 2024 Victorian local elections in Inner Melbourne
- Results of the 2024 Victorian local elections in Loddon Mallee
- Results of the 2024 Victorian local elections in Northern Melbourne
- Results of the 2024 Victorian local elections in South-Eastern Melbourne
- Results of the 2024 Victorian local elections in Western Melbourne

=== Individual LGAs ===
- 2024 Melbourne City Council election

== Statewide results ==
Map of results by ward.

Party	Votes	%	Swing	Seats (Note: Excluding directly-elected mayors and deputy mayors.)	Change (Note: Compared to before the 2024 elections, not the result of the 2020 elections.)
Independents	2,093,674	60.29		457	
Ind. Labor	375,223	10.81		58	
Ind. Liberal	356,697	10.27		48	
Greens	201,189	5.79		28	Steady
Labor	121,013	3.45	+1.01	20	▲8
Victorian Socialists	67,296	1.94	+1.33	1	Steady
Community Independents (Whittlesea)	30,018	0.86	+0.86	2	▲2
Your Local Independents (Merri-bek)	21,940	0.63	+0.63	2	▼1
Team Nick Reece (Melbourne)	18,558	0.53	-0.21	2	(Note: Compared with Team Sally Capp at the 2020 election.)
Libertarian	18,449	0.53		2 (Note: Including Paul Barker (Surf Coast) who was endorsed by the Libertarian Party but contested the election with the Back to Basics Team.)	Steady
Ind. National	16,439	0.47		5	▼1
Yarra For All (Yarra)	16,157	0.46	+0.46	4	▲1
Community Labor (Maribyrnong)	15,914	0.46	+0.46	3	▲3
Ind. Libertarian	13,133	0.38		2 (Note: Not including Joel Grist (Surf Coast) who is a member of the Libertarian Party (and thus an Independent Libertarian) but contested the election with the Back to Basics Team.)	▲2
Liberal	12,841	0.37	+0.37	1	▲1
Socialist Alliance	12,771	0.37	+0.09	1	Steady
Team Kouta (Melbourne)	10,588	0.30	+0.30	1 (Note: Including Gladys Liu (Melbourne), who is also a Liberal Party member (and thus an Independent Liberal).)	▲1
Team Wood (Melbourne)	9,366	0.27	-0.10	1	Steady
Residents of Port Phillip (Port Phillip)	7,279	0.21	-0.06	3	▲1
Ind. Freedom	6,452	0.19	+0.19	0	Steady
Animal Justice	5,618	0.16		0	▼1
People Empowering (Port Phillip)	5,465	0.16	+0.16	1	▲1
Back to Basics Team (Surf Coast)	4,183 (Note: Including Joel Grist, who was a member of the Libertarian Party (and thus an Independent Libertarian), but not including Paul Barker, who was endorsed by the Libertarian Party.)	0.12	+0.12	2	▲2
Team Morgan (Melbourne)	3,654	0.10	+0.05	1	▲1
Ind. Democratic Labour	3,441	0.10		0	Steady
Ind. United Australia	3,252	0.09	+0.09	1	Steady
Rip Up the Bike Lanes! (Melbourne)	2,878	0.08	+0.08	0	Steady
Team Hakim (Melbourne)	2,813	0.08	+0.07	0	▼1
Voices for Melbourne (Melbourne)	2,689	0.08	+0.08	0	Steady
Ind. Federation	2,189	0.06	+0.06	1	▲1
Ind. Sustainable Australia	2,013	0.06	+0.04	0	Steady
Ind. Family First	1,893	0.05	+0.05	0	Steady
Ind. Socialist Alliance	1,569	0.04		0	Steady
Innovate Melbourne (Melbourne)	1,547	0.04	+0.04	1	▲1
Your Voice Matters to Me (Melbourne)	1,134	0.03	+0.03	0	Steady
Team Elvis Martin (Melbourne)	1,000	0.03	+0.03	0	Steady
Ind. Legalise Cannabis	996	0.03	+0.03	0	Steady
Team Participate (Melbourne)	461	0.01	+0.01	0	Steady
Fusion	351	0.01	+0.01	0	Steady
Ind. Fusion	274	0.01	+0.01	0	Steady
Formal votes	3,472,417				
Informal votes					
Total				645	
Registered voters / turnout	4,532,506				

== Maps ==
=== LGA results by ward ===
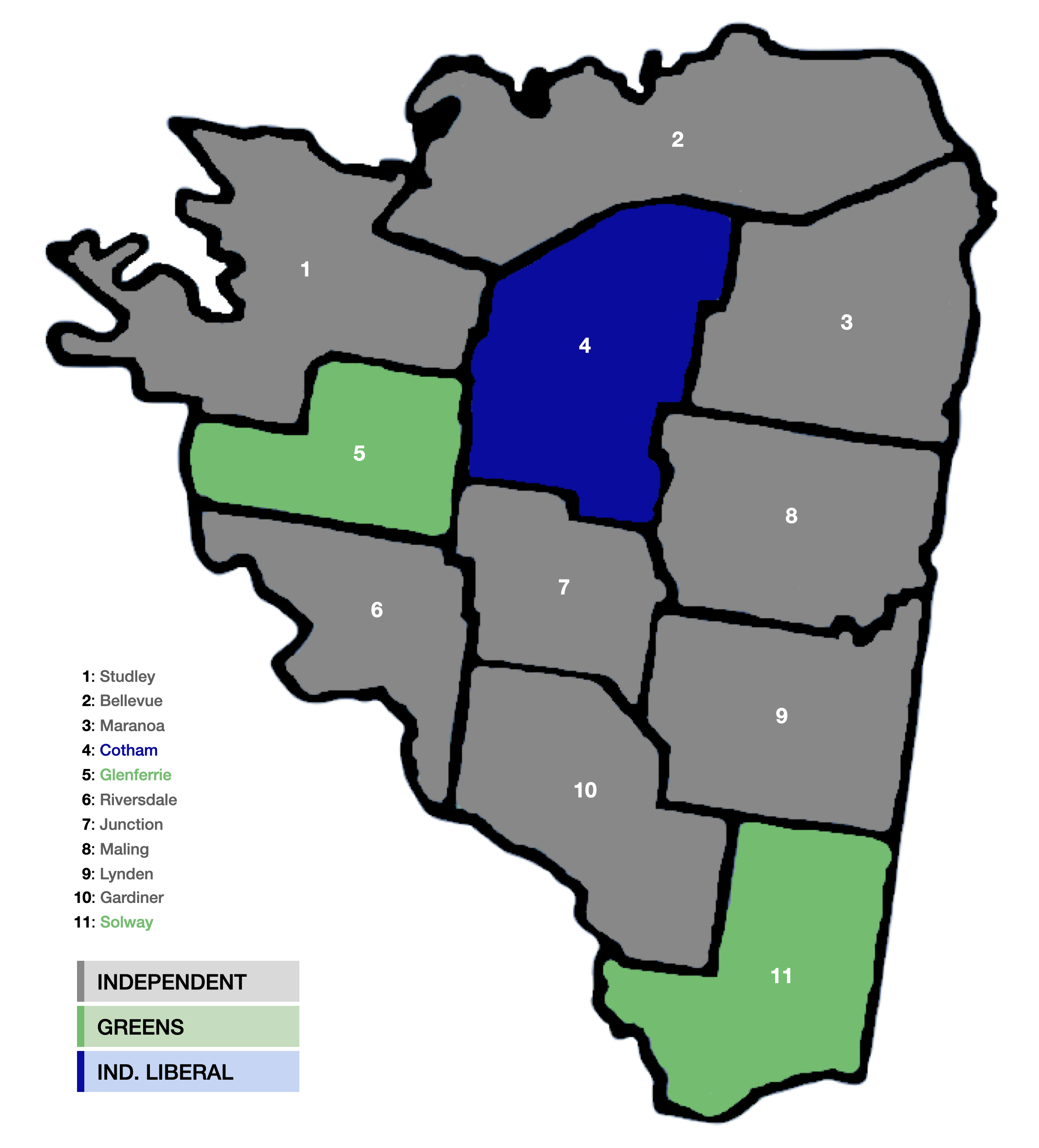
Boroondara

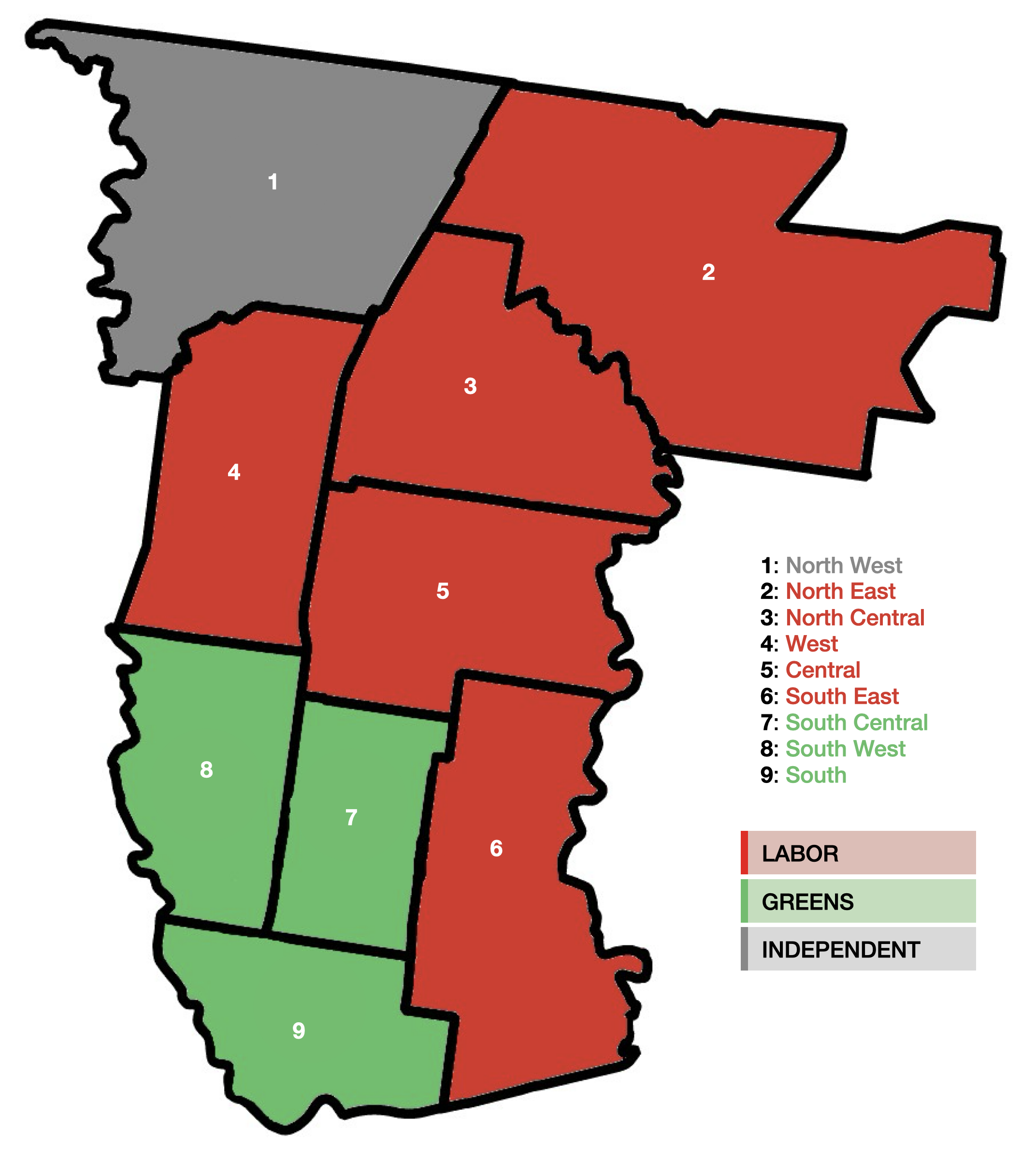
Darebin

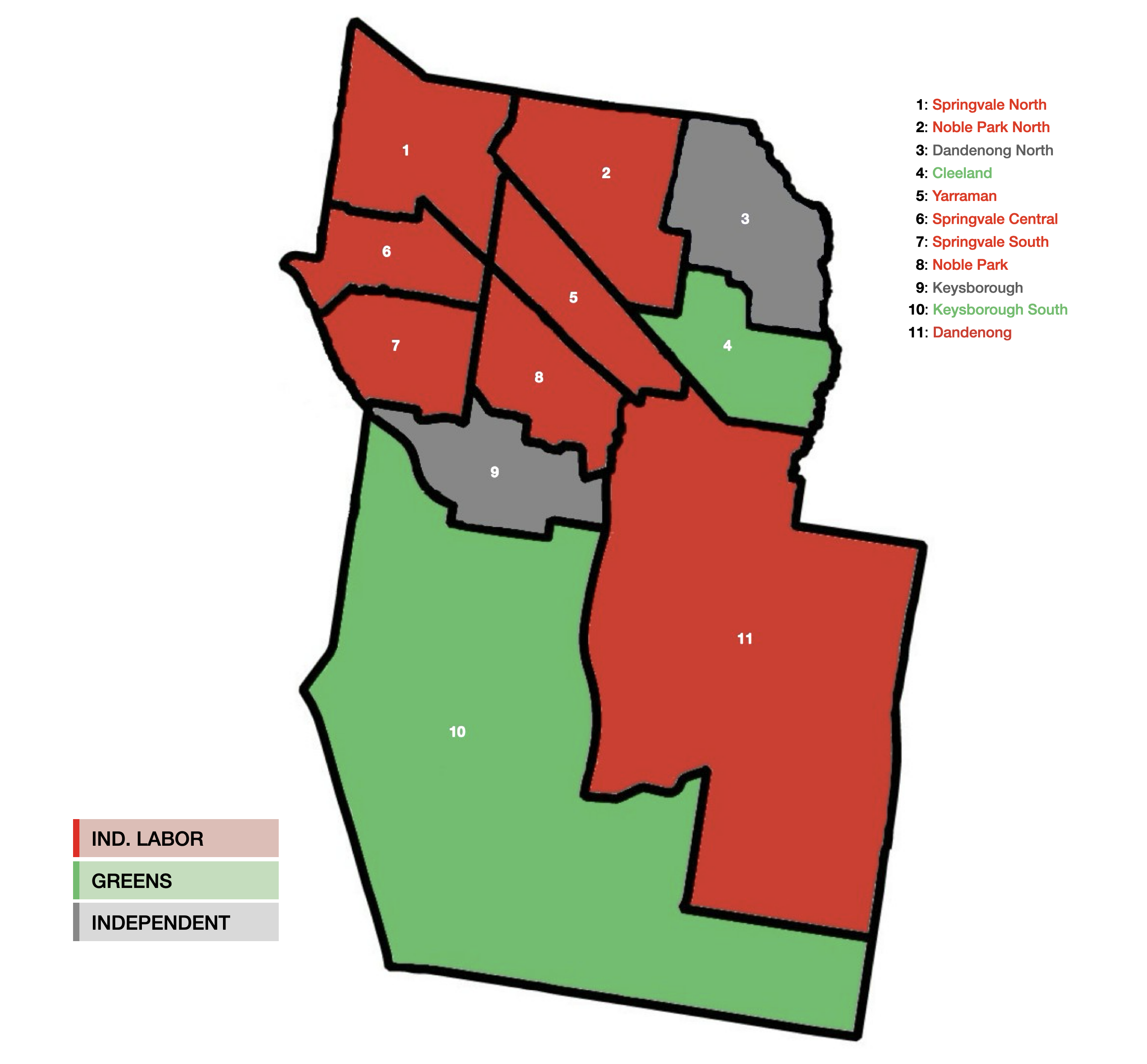
Greater Dandenong

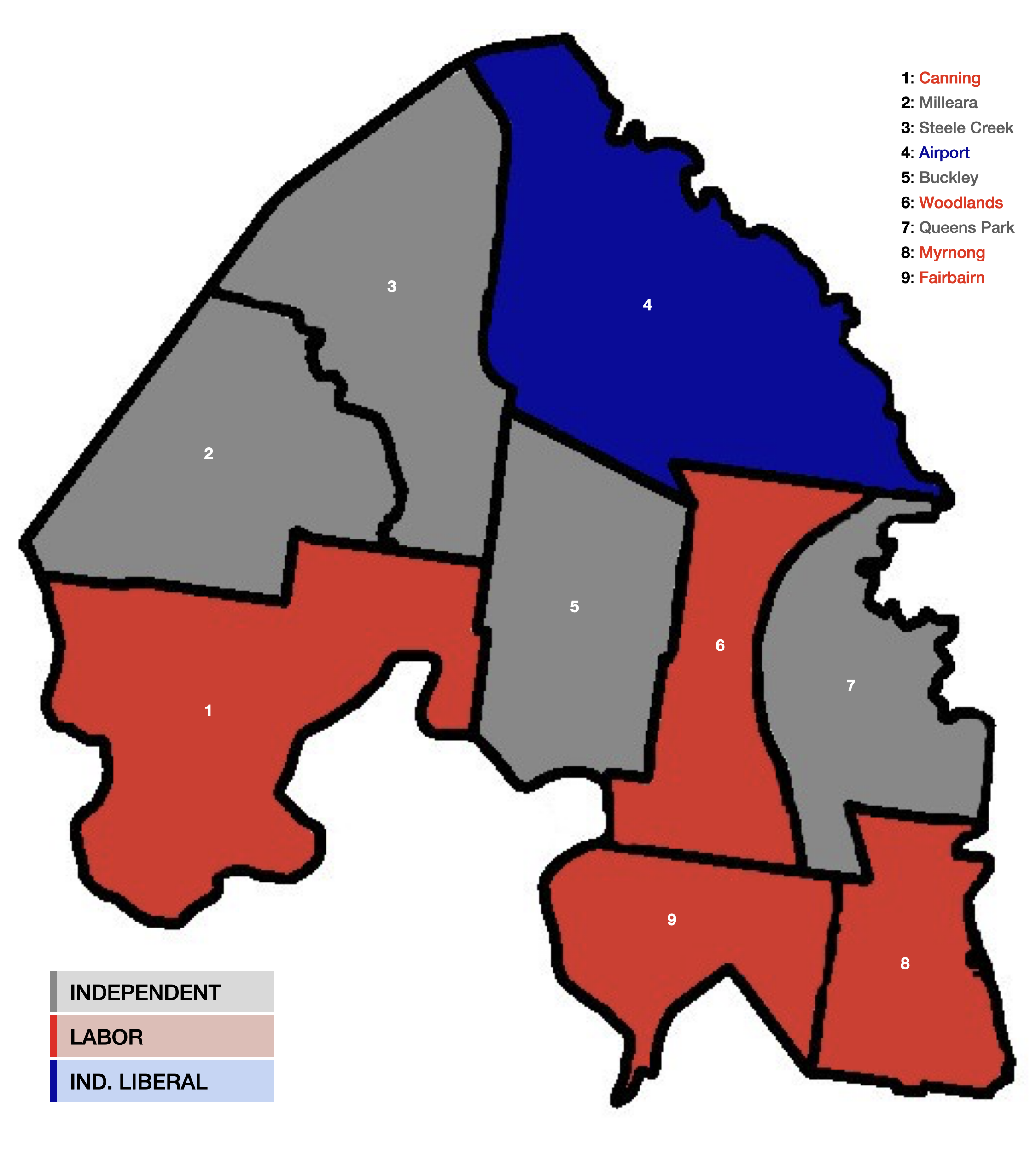
Moonee Valley

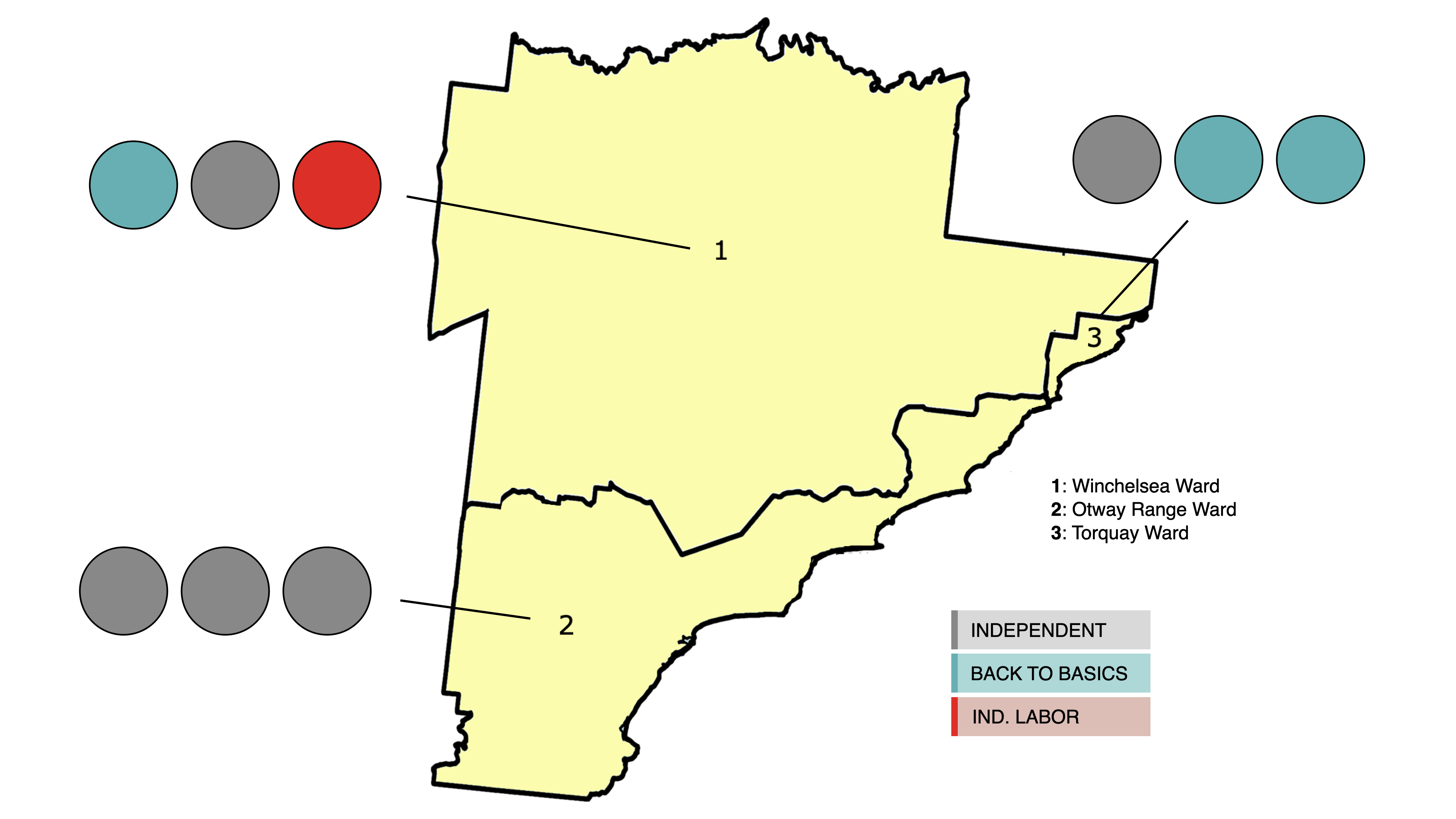
Surf Coast

=== Results by party ===
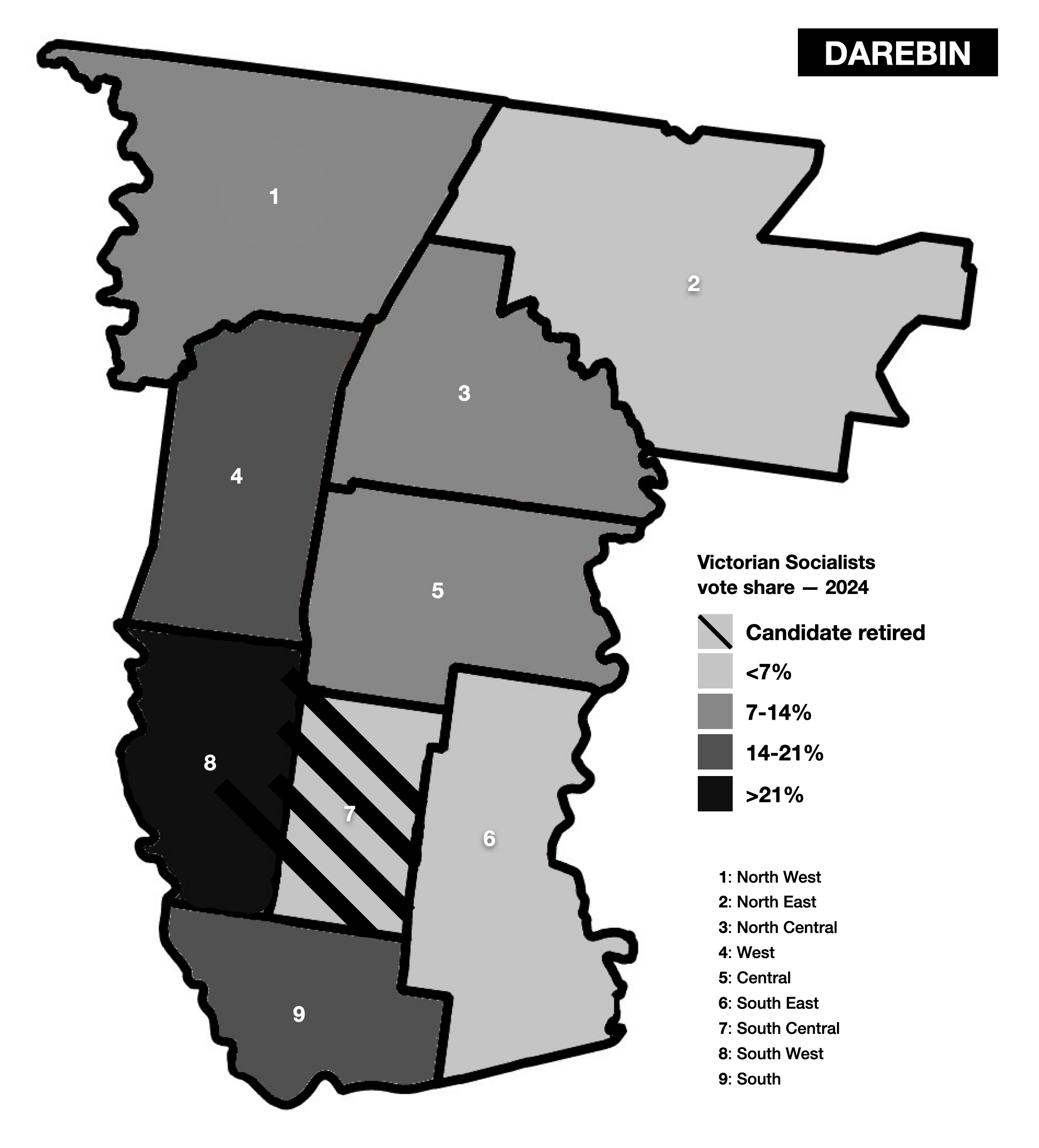
Victorian Socialists in Darebin
