= Results of the 2024 Victorian local elections in Hume =

2024 Victorian local elections (Hume)
- October 2024

This is a list of results for the 2024 Victorian local elections in the Hume region.

Hume has a population of around 320,000 and covers twelve local government areas (LGAs), including the City of Greater Shepparton.

No election will be held for Moira Shire Council after the council was dismissed in March 2023 and a panel of administrators was appointed. The next election for Moira is scheduled to be held in October 2028.

== Alpine ==
2024 Alpine Shire Council election
- October 2024

All 7 seats on Alpine Shire Council 4 seats needed for a majority
Largest party before election
Independents
Subsequent largest party
Independents

Alpine Shire Council is composed of a single multi-member ward electing seven councillors.

=== Alpine results ===
2024 Victorian local elections: Alpine
Party	Candidate	Votes	%	±%
Independent	Sarah Nicholas (elected 1)	1,430	18.11	+10.89
Independent	John Andersen (elected 2)	1,255	15.89	
Independent	David Byrne (elected 6)	794	10.06	
Independent	Noah Tanzen (elected 5)	789	9.99	
Independent	Gareth Graham (elected 3)	742	9.40	
Independent	Peter Smith (elected 4)	732	9.27	
Independent	Kevin Grentell	595	7.54	
Independent	Jean-Pierre Ronco (elected 7)	482	6.10	+3.79
Independent	Kitty Knappstein	437	5.53	+2.34
Independent	Ray Dyer	325	4.12	
Independent	Bruce McDonald	163	2.06	
Independent	Sebastian Collyer	152	1.93	
Total formal votes		7,896	94.31	−0.73
Informal votes		476	5.69	+0.73
Turnout		8,372	81.78	−1.98

== Benalla ==
2024 Benalla Rural City Council election
- October 2024

All 7 seats on Benalla Rural City Council 4 seats needed for a majority
Largest party before election
Independents
Subsequent largest party
Independents

Benalla Rural City Council is composed of a single multi-member ward electing seven councillors.

=== Benalla results ===
2024 Victorian local elections: Benalla
Party	Candidate	Votes	%	±%
Independent	Peter Davis (elected 1)	1,223	13.40	−1.94
Independent	Nathan Tolliday (elected 2)	1,119	12.26	
Independent	Justin R King (elected 3)	1,072	11.74	−2.83
Independent	David George Blore (elected 4)	778	8.52	
Independent	Bernie Hearn (elected 5)	728	7.98	−1.37
Independent	Puna Hewa Gunaratne (elected 7)	653	7.15	−0.20
Independent	Vincent Michael Branigan	530	5.81	−1.02
Independent	Gail O'Brien	506	5.54	−3.51
Independent	Philip Hauptmann	496	5.43	
Independent	Jillian Merkel (elected 6)	483	5.29	
Independent	Suzie Pearce	386	4.23	
Independent	Philip Leo Murphy	353	3.87	
Independent	Kevin Smith	349	3.82	
Independent	Mark Jones	256	2.80	
Independent	Annette Borradale	196	2.15	
Total formal votes		9,128	93.17	–2.56
Informal votes		669	6.83	+2.56
Turnout		9,797	83.85	−0.82

== Greater Shepparton ==
2024 Greater Shepparton City Council election
- October 2024

All 9 seats on Greater Shepparton City Council 5 seats needed for a majority
Largest party before election
Independents
Subsequent largest party
Independents

Greater Shepparton City Council is composed of nine single-member wards. Prior to the 2024 election, it was composed of a single multi-member ward electing nine councillors, but the electoral structure has changed as a result of the Local Government Act 2020.

=== Greater Shepparton results ===
2024 Victorian local elections: Greater Shepparton
Party	Votes	%	Swing	Seats	Change
Independent	23,511	83.41		7	Steady
Independent Federation	2,189	7.77		1	▲1
Independent Libertarian	1,711	6.07		1	▲1
Independent Freedom	628	2.23		0	Steady
Independent Liberal	148	0.53		0	Steady
Formal votes	28,187	97.25			
Informal votes	798	2.75			
Total	28,985	100.00		9	Steady
Registered voters / turnout	46,851				

=== Balaclava ===
2024 Victorian local elections: Balaclava Ward
Party	Candidate	Votes	%	±%
Independent	Shane Sali	3,213	74.95	
Independent Freedom	Diane Teasdale	628	14.65	
Independent	Rudo Makombe	446	10.40	
Total formal votes		4,287	98.26	
Informal votes		76	1.74	
Turnout		4,363	81.95	
Independent win		(new ward)		

=== Goulburn River ===
2024 Victorian local elections: Goulburn River Ward
Party	Candidate	Votes	%	±%
Independent	Paul Wickham	1,196	30.12	
Independent	Emmersyn Rea	951	23.95	
Independent	Sherri Smith-Hoyer	799	20.12	
Independent	Simon Wyatt	518	13.04	
Independent	Severin Duhring	359	9.04	
Independent Liberal	Rowan Farren	148	3.73	
Total formal votes		3,971	98.17	
Informal votes		74	1.83	
Turnout		4,045	83.21	
Two-candidate-preferred result
Independent	Paul Wickham	2,015	50.74	
Independent	Emmersyn Rea	1,956	49.26	
Independent win		(new ward)		

=== Kialla ===
2024 Victorian local elections: Kialla Ward
Party	Candidate	Votes	%	±%
Independent	Anthony Brophy	1,568	34.67	
Independent	Terri Cowley	1,419	31.38	
Independent	Kamal Dhillon	909	20.10	
Independent	Brendan Gosstray	626	13.84	
Total formal votes		4,522	97.65	
Informal votes		109	2.35	
Turnout		4,631	84.46	
Two-candidate-preferred result
Independent	Anthony Brophy	2,370	52.41	
Independent	Terri Cowley	2,152	47.59	
Independent win		(new ward)		

=== Lower Goulburn ===
2024 Victorian local elections: Lower Goulburn Ward
Party	Candidate	Votes	%	±%
Independent Libertarian	Kieron Eddy	1,711	45.54	
Independent	Dinny Adem	901	23.98	
Independent	Santhiya Subramaniam	577	15.36	
Independent	Garry James Alexander	568	15.12	
Total formal votes		3,757	97.38	
Informal votes		101	2.62	
Turnout		3,858	75.35	
After distribution of preferences
Independent Libertarian	Kieron Eddy	2,040	54.30	
Independent	Dinny Adem	1,051	27.97	
Independent	Santhiya Subramaniam	666	17.73	
Independent Libertarian win		(new ward)		

=== McEwen ===
2024 Victorian local elections: McEwen Ward
Party	Candidate	Votes	%	±%
Independent Federation	Steven Threlfall	2,189	58.92	
Independent	Ben Ladson	1,526	41.08	
Total formal votes		3,715	95.01	
Informal votes		195	4.99	
Turnout		3,910	73.59	
Independent Federation win		(new ward)		

=== Midland ===
2024 Victorian local elections: Midland Ward
Party	Candidate	Votes	%	±%
Independent	Rod Schubert	unopposed		
Registered electors		5,213		
Independent win		(new ward)		

=== Pine Lodge ===
2024 Victorian local elections: Pine Lodge Ward
Party	Candidate	Votes	%	±%
Independent	Geoff Akers	2,213	49.47	
Independent	Jac McCarty	1,019	22.78	
Independent	Ian Martin	710	15.87	
Independent	Phillip Chua	531	11.87	
Total formal votes		4,473	97.58	
Informal votes		111	2.42	
Turnout		4,584	84.16	
After distribution of preferences
Independent	Geoff Akers	2,368	52.94	
Independent	Jac McCarty	1,250	27.95	
Independent	Ian Martin	855	19.11	
Independent win		(new ward)		

=== Poplar ===
2024 Victorian local elections: Poplar Ward
Party	Candidate	Votes	%	±%
Independent	Sam Spinks	unopposed		
Registered electors		5,102		
Independent win		(new ward)		

=== Yanha Gurtji ===
2024 Victorian local elections: Yanha Gurtji Ward
Party	Candidate	Votes	%	±%
Independent	Fern Summer	1,409	40.70	
Independent	Tom Saxton	1,060	30.62	
Independent	Leigh Johnson	993	28.68	
Total formal votes		3,462	96.33	
Informal votes		132	3.67	
Turnout		3,594	72.05	
Two-candidate-preferred result
Independent	Fern Summer	1,788	51.65	
Independent	Tom Saxton	1,674	48.35	
Independent win		(new ward)		

== Indigo ==
2024 Indigo Shire Council election
- October 2024

All 7 seats on Indigo Shire Council 4 seats needed for a majority
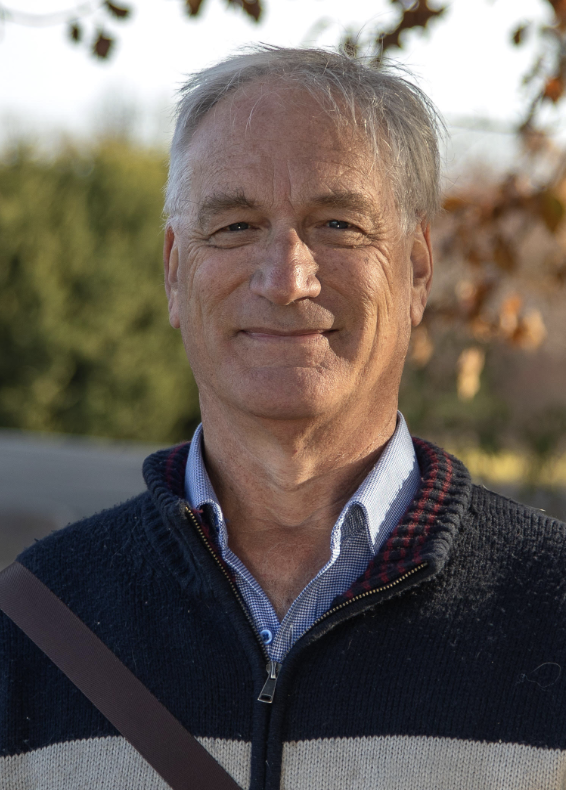
	First party	Second party
	IND
Leader	N/A	Graham Parton
Party	Independents	Greens
Last election	6 seats	1 seat
Seats before	7	0
Seats won	7	0
Seat change	Steady	Steady
First preference vote	10,229	639
Percentage	94.12	5.88
Largest party before election
Independents
Subsequent largest party
Independents

Indigo Shire Council is composed of a single multi-member ward electing seven councillors.

In February 2022, Greens councillor and former mayor Jenny O'Connor resigned from council, and was replaced by Emmerick Teissl via a countback. In July 2023, independent councillor Larry Goldsworthy resigned and was replaced by Sue Gold.

=== Indigo results ===
2024 Victorian local elections: Indigo
Party	Candidate	Votes	%	±%
Independent	Sophie Price (elected 1)	2,351	21.63	+9.83
Independent	John Harvey (elected 3)	1,231	11.33	+6.00
Independent	Greg Bourke (elected 6)	1,137	10.46	
Independent	Roberta Horne (elected 5)	1,035	9.52	+3.56
Independent	Scott Landells (elected 4)	1,007	9.27	
Independent	Bernard Gaffney	933	8.58	+2.51
Independent	Jane Dowsley (elected 2)	911	8.38	
Independent	Diane Shepheard (elected 7)	639	5.88	+0.79
Greens	Graham Parton	639	5.88	−16.71
Independent	Emmerick Teissl	580	5.34	+0.43
Independent	Lisa Turner	405	3.73	
Total formal votes		10,868	95.02	+3.16
Informal votes		569	4.98	−3.16
Turnout		11,437	83.82	−0.68

== Mansfield ==
2024 Mansfield Shire Council election
- October 2024

All 5 seats on Mansfield Shire Council 3 seats needed for a majority
Largest party before election
Independents
Subsequent largest party
Independents

Mansfield Shire Council is composed of a single multi-member ward electing five councillors.

Kammy Cordner Hunt, the registered officer of the Fusion Party, contested the election without endorsement from the party.

=== Mansfield results ===
2024 Victorian local elections: Mansfield
Party	Candidate	Votes	%	±%
Independent	James Tehan (elected 1)	1,703	25.91	−0.86
Independent	Steve Rabie (elected 2)	1,282	19.50	+12.02
Independent	Mandy Treasure (elected 3)	858	13.05	
Independent	Bonnie Clark (elected 4)	754	11.47	
Independent	Tim Berenyi (elected 5)	666	10.13	
Independent	Michael Whytcross	491	7.47	
Independent	Nick Cooper	312	4.75	
Independent Fusion	Kammy Cordner Hunt	274	4.17	−1.45
Independent	Rohan Webb	233	3.54	−6.51
Total formal votes		6,573	96.98	+2.56
Informal votes		205	3.02	−2.56
Turnout		6,778	82.90	+3.07

== Mitchell ==
2024 Mitchell Shire Council election
- October 2024

All 9 seats on Mitchell Shire Council 5 seats needed for a majority
Largest party before election
Independents
Subsequent largest party
Independents

Mitchell Shire Council is composed of three multi-member wards that elect three councillors each.

=== Mitchell results ===
2024 Victorian local elections: Mitchell
Party	Votes	%	Swing	Seats	Change
Independent	28,645	98.65		9	Steady
Victorian Socialists	392	1.35		0	Steady
Formal votes	29,037	95.98			
Informal votes	1,216	4.02			
Total	30,253	100.00		9	Steady
Registered voters / turnout	37,598	80.46			

=== Central ===
2024 Victorian local elections: Central Ward
Party	Candidate	Votes	%	±%
Independent	Nathan Clark (elected 2)	2,188	22.43	−0.90
Independent	Timothy Hanson (elected 1)	2,175	22.29	
Independent	Bob Humm (elected 3)	2,033	20.84	+1.61
Independent	Brett Owen	1,619	16.59	
Independent	Mike Haysom	700	7.18	
Independent	Andries Brand	599	6.14	
Independent	Douglas John Dyson	442	4.53	
Total formal votes		9,756	95.90	−1.34
Informal votes		417	4.10	+1.34
Turnout		10,173	81.14	−2.16

=== North ===
2024 Victorian local elections: North Ward
Party	Candidate	Votes	%	±%
Independent	Ned Jeffery (elected 1)	2,215	23.41	
Independent	John Dougall (elected 2)	2,007	21.21	
Independent	Bill Chisholm	1,849	19.54	−3.10
Independent	Andrea Pace (elected 3)	1,686	17.82	
Independent	Stuart Gregory Ferguson	859	9.08	
Independent	Eric Houghton	847	8.95	
Total formal votes		9,463	96.39	−0.83
Informal votes		354	3.61	+0.83
Turnout		9,817	80.18	−0.04

=== South ===
2024 Victorian local elections: South Ward
Party	Candidate	Votes	%	±%
Independent	Riley Evans (elected 1)	3,726	37.95	
Independent	Bob Cornish (elected 2)	1,902	19.37	−2.52
Independent	Claudia James (elected 3)	1,579	16.08	
Independent	David Andrew Lowe	953	9.71	
Independent	Ginni Kocher	468	4.77	
Victorian Socialists	Akashdeep Singh	392	3.99	
Independent	Jasdeep Kochar	375	3.82	
Independent	Bikram Singh	224	2.28	−3.06
Independent	Indervir Singh	199	2.03	
Total formal votes		9,818	95.66	−0.64
Informal votes		445	4.34	+0.64
Turnout		10,263	80.08	−1.11

== Murrindindi ==
2024 Murrindindi Shire Council election
- October 2024

All 7 seats on Murrindindi Shire Council 4 seats needed for a majority
Largest party before election
Independents
Subsequent largest party
Independents

Murrindindi Shire Council is composed of seven single-member wards.

=== Murrindindi results ===
2024 Victorian local elections: Murrindindi
Party	Votes	%	Swing	Seats	Change
Independent	8,769	88.81		7	Steady
Libertarian	1,105	11.19		0	Steady
Formal votes	9,874	96.06			
Informal votes	405	3.94			
Total	10,279	100.00		7	Steady
Registered voters / turnout	12,542	81.96			

=== Cathedral ===
2024 Victorian local elections: Cathedral Ward
Party	Candidate	Votes	%	±%
Independent	Sandice McAulay	1,028	76.09	
Independent	Judy Duncan	323	23.91	
Total formal votes		1,351	95.34	
Informal votes		66	4.66	
Turnout		1,417	82.19	
Independent hold				

=== Cheviot ===
2024 Victorian local elections: Cheviot Ward
Party	Candidate	Votes	%	±%
Independent	Sue Carpenter	810	54.84	−2.51
Independent	Paul Galea	667	45.16	
Total formal votes		1,477	95.41	−2.57
Informal votes		71	4.59	+2.57
Turnout		1,548	84.22	+1.59
Independent hold		Swing	–2.51	

=== Eildon ===
2024 Victorian local elections: Eildon Ward
Party	Candidate	Votes	%	±%
Independent	Anita Carr	1,087	73.74	
Independent	Ian Maskiell	267	18.11	
Independent	John Storen	120	8.14	
Total formal votes		1,474	97.23	+0.22
Informal votes		42	2.77	−0.22
Turnout		1,516	81.59	+2.64
Independent gain from Independent				

=== King Parrot ===
2024 Victorian local elections: King Parrot Ward
Party	Candidate	Votes	%	±%
Independent	Eric Lording	810	58.53	−6.12
Independent	Kim Travers	574	41.47	+6.12
Total formal votes		1,384	94.09	−1.27
Informal votes		87	5.91	+1.27
Turnout		1,471	81.00	+5.27
Independent hold		Swing	−6.12	

=== Kinglake ===
2024 Victorian local elections: Kinglake Ward
Party	Candidate	Votes	%	±%
Independent	Jodi Adams	712	50.68	
Libertarian	Stuart Hollingsworth	693	49.32	
Total formal votes		1,405	95.77	
Informal votes		62	4.23	
Turnout		1,467	81.32	
Independent gain from Independent				

==== 2026 Kinglake Ward by-election ====
2026 Kinglake Ward by-election (28 October 2026)
Party	Candidate	Votes	%	±%
Independent	Jordyn Princi	unopposed		
Independent gain from Independent		Swing	N/A	

- By-election held after the resignation of sitting councillor Jodi Adams.
- Jordyn Princi was the only candidate to nominate for the by-election. Therefore, voting was not conducted and the VEC declared Princi to be elected unopposed on 28 October 2026.

=== Koriella ===
2024 Victorian local elections: Koriella Ward
Party	Candidate	Votes	%	±%
Independent	Paul Hildebrand	722	50.81	
Libertarian	Tim Molesworth	412	28.99	
Independent	Jane Moss	287	20.20	
Total formal votes		1,421	98.41	+2.22
Informal votes		23	1.59	−2.22
Turnout		1,444	82.14	+0.25
Independent gain from Independent				

=== Red Gate ===
2024 Victorian local elections: Red Gate Ward
Party	Candidate	Votes	%	±%
Independent	Damien Gallagher	1,041	76.43	+31.27
Independent	Jo Timbury	321	23.57	
Total formal votes		1,362	96.19	−1.47
Informal votes		54	3.81	+1.47
Turnout		1,416	81.24	−2.62
Independent hold		Swing	+23.81	

== Strathbogie ==
2024 Strathbogie Shire Council election
- October 2024

All 7 seats on Strathbogie Shire Council 4 seats needed for a majority
Largest party before election
Independents
Subsequent largest party
Independents

Strathbogie Shire Council is composed of a single multi-member ward electing seven councillors. Prior to the 2024 election, it was composed of five wards (three single-member wards and two two-member wards), but the electoral structure has changed as a result of the Local Government Act 2020.

=== Strathbogie results ===
2024 Victorian local elections: Strathbogie
Party	Candidate	Votes	%	±%
Independent	Scott Jeffery (elected 1)	1,265	17.22	
Independent	Fiona Stevens (elected 2)	990	13.57	
Independent Liberal	Claire Ewart-Kennedy (elected 3)	629	8.56	
Independent	Gregory Carlson (elected 6)	618	8.41	
Independent	Laura Binks (elected 5)	599	8.15	
Independent	Vicki Halsall (elected 4)	568	7.73	
Independent	Clark Holloway (elected 7)	447	6.08	
Independent	Jimmy Davidson	364	4.95	
Independent	Frank York	330	4.49	
Independent	Amanda McClaren	323	4.40	
Independent	Brad Smith	307	4.18	
Independent	Christopher Raeburn	300	4.08	
Independent	Jim Billings	226	3.08	
Independent	Stephen Peter Mahon	194	2.64	
Independent	Robin Hull Weatherald	188	2.56	
Total formal votes		7,348	93.07	
Informal votes		537	6.93	
Turnout		7,895	83.91	

== Towong ==
2024 Towong Shire Council election
- October 2024

All 5 seats on Towong Shire Council 3 seats needed for a majority
Largest party before election
Independents
Subsequent largest party
Independents

Towong Shire Council is composed of a single multi-member ward electing five councillors.

=== Towong results ===
2024 Victorian local elections: Towong
Party	Candidate	Votes	%	±%
Independent	David John Wortmann (elected 1)	899	23.03	–7.51
Independent	Andrew Whitehead (elected 2)	661	16.93	–0.51
Independent	Denise Anderson (elected 3)	617	15.80	+7.21
Independent	Peter Tolsher (elected 5)	550	14.09	+14.09
Independent	Jon Pitman (elected 4)	426	10.91	+10.91
Independent	Aaron Scales	396	10.14	+0.45
Independent	Matthew Spurgeon	355	9.09	+9.09
Total formal votes		3,904	97.26	+0.67
Informal votes		110	2.74	–0.67
Turnout		4,014	81.40	+1.23

== Wangaratta ==
2024 Wangaratta Rural City Council election
- October 2024

All 7 seats on Wangaratta Rural City Council 4 seats needed for a majority
Largest party before election
Independents
Subsequent largest party
Independents

Wangaratta Rural City Council is composed of seven single-member wards. Prior to the 2024 election, it was composed of four wards (three single-member wards and one four-member ward), but the electoral structure has changed as a result of the Local Government Act 2020.

=== Wangaratta results ===
2024 Victorian local elections: Wangaratta
Party	Votes	%	Swing	Seats	Change
Independents	12,149	93.99		7	Steady
Libertarian	777	6.01		0	Steady
Formal votes	12,926	96.88			
Informal votes	416	3.12			
Total	13,342	100.00		7	Steady
Registered voters / turnout	22,820				

=== Appin ===
2024 Victorian local elections: Appin Ward
Party	Candidate	Votes	%	±%
Independent	Tania Maxwell	1,563	55.21	
Independent	Mark Currie	1,268	44.79	
Total formal votes		2,831	96.79	
Informal votes		94	3.21	
Turnout		2,925	85.58	
Independent win		(new ward)		

=== Bullawah ===
2024 Victorian local elections: Bullawah Ward
Party	Candidate	Votes	%	±%
Independent	Dave Fuller	1,820	73.89	
Independent	Brian Fox	643	26.11	
Total formal votes		2,463	94.69	
Informal votes		138	5.31	
Turnout		2,601	79.15	
Independent win		(new ward)		

=== King River ===
2024 Victorian local elections: King River Ward
Party	Candidate	Votes	%	±%
Independent	Harry Bussell	unopposed		
Registered electors		3,264		
Independent win		(new ward)		

=== Ovens ===
2024 Victorian local elections: Ovens Ward
Party	Candidate	Votes	%	±%
Independent	Harvey Benton	1,207	47.26	
Independent	Jennifer Garrett	747	29.25	
Independent	Rebecca Shenfield	600	23.49	
Total formal votes		2,554	97.82	
Informal votes		57	2.18	
Turnout		2,611	85.44	
Two-candidate-preferred result
Independent	Harvey Benton	1,478	57.87	
Independent	Jennifer Garrett	1,076	42.13	
Independent win		(new ward)		

=== Warby ===
2024 Victorian local elections: Warby Ward
Party	Candidate	Votes	%	±%
Independent	Irene Grant	unopposed		
Registered electors		3,104		
Independent hold				

=== Wareena ===
2024 Victorian local elections: Wareena Ward
Party	Candidate	Votes	%	±%
Independent	Ashlee Fitzpatrick	1,243	47.26	
Independent	Peter Siperki	788	29.96	
Independent	Mel Paul	599	22.78	
Total formal votes		2,630	97.05	
Informal votes		80	2.95	
Turnout		2,710	79.82	
Two-candidate-preferred result
Independent	Ashlee Fitzpatrick	1,527	58.06	
Independent	Peter Siperki	1,103	41.94	
Independent win		(new ward)		

=== Yarrunga ===
2024 Victorian local elections: Yarrunga Ward
Party	Candidate	Votes	%	±%
Libertarian	Julian Fidge	777	31.74	
Independent	Allison Winters	694	28.35	
Independent	Anne Dunstan	551	22.51	
Independent	Joanne Pane	426	17.40	
Total formal votes		2,448	98.12	
Informal votes		47	1.88	
Turnout		2,611	75.67	
Two-candidate-preferred result
Independent	Allison Winters	1,348	55.07	
Libertarian	Julian Fidge	1,100	44.93	
Independent win		(new ward)		

== Wodonga ==
2024 Wodonga City Council election
- October 2024

All 7 seats on Wodonga City Council 4 seats needed for a majority
Largest party before election
Independents
Subsequent largest party
Independents

Wodonga City Council is composed of seven single-member wards. Prior to the 2024 election, it was composed of a single ward electing seven councillors, but the electoral structure has changed as a result of the Local Government Act 2020.

The Libertarian Party endorsed three candidates, including incumbent councillor Olga Quilty and former councillor Tim Quilty.

=== Wodonga results ===
2024 Victorian local elections: Wodonga
Party	Votes	%	Swing	Seats	Change
Independents	19,364	80.04	−1.29	6	Steady
Libertarian	3,652	15.10	+9.27	1	Steady
Independent Liberal	1,175	4.86	−0.80	0	Steady
Formal votes	24,191	96.71	+5.19		
Informal votes	822	3.29	−5.19		
Total	25,013	100.00		7	Steady
Registered voters / turnout	32,408	77.18	+0.60		

=== Baranduda Range ===
2024 Victorian local elections: Baranduda Range Ward
Party	Candidate	Votes	%	±%
Independent	Josh Knight	2,078	59.64	
Independent	Lu Pelizzari	1,406	40.36	
Total formal votes		3,484	96.40	
Informal votes		130	3.60	
Turnout		3,614	81.45	
Independent win		(new ward)		

=== Barnawartha North ===
2024 Victorian local elections: Barnawartha North Ward
Party	Candidate	Votes	%	±%
Independent	Matt Burke	1,409	37.20	
Independent	Michelle Cowan	1,292	34.11	
Independent	Rachael Voogt	1,087	28.70	
Total formal votes		3,788	97.23	
Informal votes		108	2.77	
Turnout		3,896	81.17	
Two-candidate-preferred result
Independent	Michelle Cowan	1,932	51.00	
Independent	Matt Burke	1,856	49.00	
Independent win		(new ward)		

=== Huon Creek ===
2024 Victorian local elections: Huon Creek Ward
Party	Candidate	Votes	%	±%
Independent	Cassie Aldridge	2,133	56.35	
Libertarian	Tim Quilty	1,652	43.65	
Total formal votes		3,785	95.87	
Informal votes		163	4.13	
Turnout		3,948	82.51	
Independent win		(new ward)		

=== Lake Hume ===
2024 Victorian local elections: Lake Hume Ward
Party	Candidate	Votes	%	±%
Independent	Hannah Seymour	1,259	37.41	
Independent	Ron Mildren	1,228	36.49	
Independent	Graeme Simpfendorfer	878	26.09	
Total formal votes		3,365	97.37	
Informal votes		91	2.63	
Turnout		3,456	73.39	
Two-candidate-preferred result
Independent	Hannah Seymour	1,724	51.23	
Independent	Ron Mildren	1,641	48.77	
Independent win		(new ward)		

==== 2025 Lake Hume Ward by-election ====
2025 Lake Hume Ward by-election (15 September–3 October 2025)
Party	Candidate	Votes	%	±%
Independent	Ron Mildren	1,433	43.56	+7.06
Independent	Bobbi McKibbin	993	30.18	+30.18
Independent	Matt Charles Burke	300	9.12	+9.12
Independent	Angie Westneat	283	8.60	+8.60
Independent	Christopher Cox	193	5.87	+5.87
Independent	Kass Wilson	88	2.67	+2.67
Total formal votes		3,290	97.16	−0.21
Informal votes		96	2.84	+0.21
Turnout		3,386	71.33	−2.06
Two-candidate-preferred result
Independent	Ron Mildren	1,935	58.81	+10.04
Independent	Bobbi McKibbin	1,355	41.19	+41.19
Independent gain from Independent		Swing	+10.04	

- By-election held after the resignation of sitting councillor Hannah Seymour.

=== Marimba Park ===
2024 Victorian local elections: Marimba Park Ward
Party	Candidate	Votes	%	±%
Libertarian	Olga Quilty	1,397	42.47	
Independent	Danny Richard Lowe	1,296	39.40	
Independent	Lorence Ferro	596	18.12	
Total formal votes		3,289	96.76	
Informal votes		110	3.24	
Turnout		3,399	73.84	
Two-candidate-preferred result
Libertarian	Olga Quilty	1,650	50.17	
Independent	Danny Richard Lowe	1,639	49.83	
Libertarian win		(new ward)		

=== Racecourse ===
2024 Victorian local elections: Racecourse Ward
Party	Candidate	Votes	%	±%
Independent	Libby Hall	1,886	55.78	
Independent	Ash Gill	955	28.25	
Independent	Brett Baird	540	15.97	
Total formal votes		3,381	96.93	
Informal votes		107	3.07	
Turnout		3,488	75.97	
Independent win		(new ward)		

=== Sumsion Gardens ===
2024 Victorian local elections: Sumsion Gardens Ward
Party	Candidate	Votes	%	±%
Independent	Michael Gobel	1,291	42.07	
Independent Liberal	Danny Chamberlain	1,175	38.29	
Libertarian	Clare Parslow	603	19.65	
Total formal votes		3,069	96.45	
Informal votes		113	3.55	
Turnout		3,182	71.00	
Two-candidate-preferred result
Independent	Michael Gobel	1,568	51.09	
Independent Liberal	Danny Chamberlain	1,501	48.91	
Independent win		(new ward)		
