= Results of the 2024 Victorian local elections in Barwon South West =

2024 Victorian local elections (Barwon South West)
- October 2024

This is a list of results for the 2024 Victorian local elections in the Barwon South West region.

Barwon South West has a population of around 450,000 and covers nine local government areas (LGAs), including the City of Greater Geelong.

== Colac Otway ==
2024 Colac Otway Shire Council election
- October 2024

All 7 seats on Colac Otway Shire Council 4 seats needed for a majority
Largest party before election
Independents
Subsequent largest party
Independents

Colac Otway Shire Council is composed of a single multi-member ward electing seven councillors.

=== Colac Otway results ===
2024 Victorian local elections: Colac Otway
Party	Candidate	Votes	%	±%
Independent	Jason Schram (elected 1)	2,188	15.81	+15.81
Independent	Chris Potter (elected 2)	1,613	11.65	–0.29
Independent	Zoe Hudgell (elected 3)	1,280	9.25	+9.25
Independent	Mick McCrickard (elected 6)	1,051	7.59	+7.59
Independent	Phil Howard (elected 4)	1,033	7.46	+7.46
Independent	Charlie Buchanan (elected 5)	1,000	7.22	+7.22
Independent	Tosh-Jake Finnigan	814	5.88	–0.77
Independent	Mick Fischer	798	5.77	+5.77
Greens	Chrissy De Deugd (elected 7)	780	5.64	–4.02
Independent	Nick Lang	667	4.82	+4.82
Independent	Cheryl Miller	539	3.89	+3.89
Independent	Rhea Sabine Wigley	438	3.16	+3.16
Independent	Max Arnott	391	2.82	+0.20
Independent	Gavin Davies	385	2.78	+2.78
Independent	Kerrie Thackeray	385	2.78	+2.78
Independent	Peter Byrnes	161	1.16	+1.16
Independent	Tina Hill	160	1.16	+1.16
Independent	John Knight	159	1.15	+1.15
Total formal votes		13,842	93.05	–1.91
Informal votes		1,034	6.95	+1.91
Turnout		14,876	84.83	+0.22

== Corangamite ==
2024 Corangamite Shire Council election
- October 2024

All 7 seats on Corangamite Shire Council 4 seats needed for a majority
Largest party before election
Independents
Subsequent largest party
Independents

Corangamite Shire Council is composed of seven single-member wards. Prior to the 2024 election, it was composed of five wards (four single-member wards and one three-member ward), but the electoral structure has changed as a result of the Local Government Act 2020.

=== Corangamite results ===
2024 Victorian local elections: Corangamite
Party	Votes	%	Seats	Change
Independents	1,435	100.00	7	Steady
Formal votes	1,435	96.89		
Informal votes	46	3.11		
Total	1,481	100.00	7	
Registered voters	12,312			

=== Cooriemungle ===
2024 Victorian local elections: Cooriemungle Ward
Party	Candidate	Votes	%	±%
Independent	Jamie John Vogels	unopposed		
Registered electors		1,625		
Independent win		(new ward)		

=== Gnotuk ===
2024 Victorian local elections: Gnotuk Ward
Party	Candidate	Votes	%	±%
Independent	Ruth Gstrein	unopposed		
Registered electors		1,835		
Independent win		(new ward)		

=== Lake Elingamite ===
2024 Victorian local elections: Lake Elingamite Ward
Party	Candidate	Votes	%	±%
Independent	Kate Makin	unopposed		
Registered electors		1,875		
Independent win		(new ward)		

=== Lake Keilambete ===
2024 Victorian local elections: Keilambete Ward
Party	Candidate	Votes	%	±%
Independent	Geraldine Conheady	unopposed		
Registered electors		1,899		
Independent win		(new ward)		

=== Leura ===
2024 Victorian local elections: Leura Ward
Party	Candidate	Votes	%	±%
Independent	Laurie Hickey	unopposed		
Registered electors		1,640		
Independent win		(new ward)		

=== Mt Elephant ===
2024 Victorian local elections: Mt Elephant Ward
Party	Candidate	Votes	%	±%
Independent	Nicholas Cole	unopposed		
Registered electors		1,633		
Independent win		(new ward)		

=== Tandarook ===
2024 Victorian local elections: Tandarook Ward
Party	Candidate	Votes	%	±%
Independent	Jo Beard	986	68.71	
Independent	Cath Jenkins	449	31.29	
Total formal votes		1,435	96.89	
Informal votes		46	3.11	
Turnout		1,481	82.05	
Independent win		(new ward)		

== Glenelg ==
2024 Glenelg Shire Council election
- October 2024

All 7 seats on Glenelg Shire Council 4 seats needed for a majority
Largest party before election
Independents
Subsequent largest party
Independents

Glenelg Shire Council is composed of a single multi-member ward electing seven councillors.

=== Glenelg results ===
2024 Victorian local elections: Glenelg
Party	Candidate	Votes	%	±%
Independent	Karen Stephens (elected 1)	2,008	16.03	+4.14
Independent	Michael Carr (elected 2)	1,969	15.72	+7.91
Independent	John Pepper (elected 3)	1,332	10.63	+10.63
Independent	Mike Noske (elected 4)	1,238	9.88	+9.88
Independent	Robyn McDonald (elected 5)	1,099	8.77	+1.74
Independent	Duane Angelino (elected 7)	851	6.79	+6.79
Independent	Matt Jowett (elected 6)	847	6.76	+6.76
Independent	Mary Picard	714	5.70	+5.70
Independent	Gary Humm	655	5.23	+5.23
Independent	Scott Martin	537	4.29	–6.73
Independent	Trever Boyd	462	3.69	+3.69
Independent	Alistair James McDonald	433	3.46	–0.02
Independent	Andrew Stephenson	383	3.06	+3.06
Total formal votes		12,528	95.14	+0.98
Informal votes		640	4.86	–0.98
Turnout		13,168	83.36	–0.62

== Greater Geelong ==
2024 Greater Geelong City Council election
- 26 October 2024

All 11 seats on Greater Geelong City Council 6 seats needed for a majority
- Registered: 205,894
- Turnout: 75.78%
	First party	Second party	Third party
	IND	IND	IND
Party	Independents	Ind. Liberal	Ind. Labor
Last election	4 seats	4 seats	1 seat
Seats before	5	1	2
Seats won	5	5	1
Seat change	Steady	▲4	▼1
First preference vote	76,564	49,653	19,238
Percentage	46.17%	29.94	11.60%
Swing	▲10.65	▲3.48	▼3.97
	Fourth party	Fifth party
		SA
Party	Greens	Socialist Alliance
Last election	1 seat	0 seats
Seats before	0	1
Seats won	0	0
Seat change	Steady	▼1
First preference vote	13,890	6,500
Percentage	8.38%	3.92%
Swing	▼1.99	▲1.31
Largest party before election
No overall control
Subsequent largest party
No overall control

Greater Geelong City Council is composed of eleven single-member wards. Prior to the 2024 election, it was composed of four multi-member wards (three three-member wards and one two-member ward), but the electoral structure has changed as a result of the Local Government Act 2020.

=== Greater Geelong results ===
2024 Victorian local elections: Greater Geelong
Party	Votes	%	Swing	Seats	Change
Independents	76,564	46.17	+10.65	6	▲2
Independent Liberal	49,653	29.94	+3.48	4	Steady
Independent Labor	19,238	11.60	−3.97	1	Steady
Greens	13,890	8.38	−1.99	0	▼1
Socialist Alliance	6,500	3.92	+1.31	0	Steady
Formal votes	165,845	96.92	+1.26		
Informal votes	5,276	3.08	−1.26		
Total	171,121	100.00		11	Steady
Registered voters / turnout	205,894	83.11	−1.26		

=== Barrabool Hills ===
2024 Victorian local elections: Barrabool Hills Ward
Party	Candidate	Votes	%	±%
Independent Liberal	Ron Nelson	8,817	51.67	
Independent	Aleta Moriarty	6,128	35.91	
Independent Labor	David McGinness	2,118	12.41	
Total formal votes		17,063	98.12	
Informal votes		327	1.88	
Turnout		17,390	86.28	
Independent Liberal win		(new ward)		

=== Charlemont ===
2024 Victorian local elections: Charlemont Ward
Party	Candidate	Votes	%	±%
Independent Liberal	Blake Hadlow	3,510	23.55	
Independent	Emma Sinclair	3,108	20.85	
Independent Labor	Teagan Mitchell	3,336	22.38	
Independent Labor	Sunny Dhaliwal	2,269	15.23	
Independent	Susan Joachim	1,578	10.59	
Greens	Sian Milton-McGurk	1,102	7.39	
Total formal votes		14,903	96.50	
Informal votes		541	3.50	
Turnout		15,444	81.16	
Two-candidate-preferred result
Independent	Emma Sinclair	7,741	51.94	
Independent Liberal	Blake Hadlow	7,163	48.06	
Independent win		(new ward)		

=== Cheetham ===
2024 Victorian local elections: Cheetham Ward
Party	Candidate	Votes	%	±%
Independent Labor	Melissa Cadwell	6,478	45.26	
Independent	Tom Gant	2,450	17.12	
Greens	Jess Harper	2,378	16.61	
Independent	Mellissa Hutchinson	1,513	10.57	
Independent Liberal	Jon Metrikas	1,494	10.44	
Total formal votes		14,313	96.86	
Informal votes		464	3.14	
Turnout		14,777	80.86	
After distribution of preferences
Independent Labor	Melissa Cadwell	7,865	54.95	
Independent	Tom Gant	3,541	24.74	
Greens	Jess Harper	2,907	20.31	
Independent Labor win		(new ward)		

=== Connewarre ===
2024 Victorian local elections: Connewarre Ward
Party	Candidate	Votes	%	±%
Independent	Elise Wilkinson	7,478	50.01	
Independent Liberal	Angela Shearman	7,475	49.99	
Total formal votes		14,953	96.80	
Informal votes		494	3.20	
Turnout		15,447	84.44	
Independent win		(new ward)		

=== Corio ===
2024 Victorian local elections: Corio Ward
Party	Candidate	Votes	%	±%
Independent	Anthony Aitken	6,700	48.19	
Socialist Alliance	Sarah Hathway	2,679	19.27	
Independent	Robert Blaszczyk	1,924	13.84	
Independent	Azadeh Doosti	1,233	8.87	
Greens	Maddie Slater	853	6.13	
Independent	Danny Mahfoud	515	3.70	
Total formal votes		13,904	96.22	
Informal votes		546	3.78	
Turnout		14,450	77.83	
After distribution of preferences
Independent	Anthony Aitken	6,964	50.09	
Socialist Alliance	Sarah Hathway	3,326	23.92	
Independent	Robert Blaszczyk	2,158	15.52	
Independent	Azadeh Doosti	1,456	10.47	
Independent win		(new ward)		

=== Deakin ===
2024 Victorian local elections: Deakin Ward
Party	Candidate	Votes	%	±%
Independent Liberal	Andrew Katos	4,492	28.08	
Greens	Izzy Scherrer	2,571	16.07	
Independent Labor	Andy Richards	2,252	14.08	
Independent Liberal	Sue Cox	2,230	13.94	
Independent Liberal	Anastasia Hilton	1,970	12.32	
Independent Labor	Joshua Haitsma	1,525	9.53	
Independent	Nicholas Kennedy	509	3.18	
Independent	Derek Wallace	447	2.79	
Total formal votes		15,996	96.25	
Informal votes		624	3.75	
Turnout		16,620	83.89	
Two-candidate-preferred result
Independent Liberal	Andrew Katos	8,653	54.07	
Greens	Izzy Scherrer	7,350	45.93	
Independent Liberal win		(new ward)		

=== Hamlyn Heights ===
2024 Victorian local elections: Hamlyn Heights Ward
Party	Candidate	Votes	%	±%
Independent	Eddy Kontelj	6,905	45.69	
Socialist Alliance	Angela Carr	3,821	25.28	
Independent	Mathew Hood	2,978	19.70	
Greens	Joey Nicita	1,410	9.33	
Total formal votes		15,114	97.86	
Informal votes		330	2.14	
Turnout		15,444	84.05	
Two-candidate-preferred result
Independent	Eddy Kontelj	8,876	58.73	
Socialist Alliance	Angela Carr	6,238	41.27	
Independent win		(new ward)		

=== Kardinia ===
2024 Victorian local elections: Kardinia Ward
Party	Candidate	Votes	%	±%
Independent Liberal	Stretch Kontelj	4,124	28.18	
Greens	Emilie Flynn	3,298	22.54	
Independent	Peter Murrihy	3,024	20.67	
Independent Liberal	Candice Costoso	1,767	12.08	
Independent Labor	Daniel Garcia	1,260	8.61	
Independent Liberal	Johnny Dunstan	865	5.91	
Independent Liberal	Peter Desbrowe-Annear	294	2.01	
Total formal votes		14,632	96.85	
Informal votes		476	3.15	
Turnout		15,108	81.26	
Two-candidate-preferred result
Independent Liberal	Stretch Kontelj	7,570	51.74	
Greens	Emilie Flynn	7,062	48.26	
Independent Liberal win		(new ward)		

=== Leopold ===
2024 Victorian local elections: Leopold Ward
Party	Candidate	Votes	%	±%
Independent Liberal	Trent Sullivan	8,865	56.21	
Independent Liberal	Shona McKeen	5,118	32.45	
Independent	David Lynch	1,789	11.34	
Total formal votes		15,772	97.04	
Informal votes		481	2.96	
Turnout		16,253	85.39	
Independent Liberal win		(new ward)		

=== Murradoc ===
2024 Victorian local elections: Murradoc Ward
Party	Candidate	Votes	%	±%
Independent Liberal	Rowan D. Story	7,449	51.21	
Independent	Kate Lockhart	7,096	48.79	
Total formal votes		14,545	96.40	
Informal votes		543	3.60	
Turnout		15,088	85.21	
Independent Liberal win		(new ward)		

=== You Yangs ===
2024 Victorian local elections: You Yangs Ward
Party	Candidate	Votes	%	±%
Independent	Chris Burson	7,015	47.88	
Independent	Lorraine Kulic	3,882	26.50	
Greens	Theresa Slater	2,278	15.55	
Independent	Nicole Lynch	1,475	10.07	
Independent	David Greenwood (ineligible) (Note: Candidate was ineligible to contest the election after not completing mandatory candidate training. They still appeared on the ballot as they were only "retired" by the Victorian Electoral Commission after ballot papers had been printed, however they could not serve as a councillor and their votes were distributed to other candidates according to voters' preferences.)	N/A	N/A	
Total formal votes		14,650	97.02	
Informal votes		450	2.98	
Turnout		15,100	83.61	
After distribution of preferences
Independent	Chris Burson	7,562	51.62	
Independent	Lorraine Kulic	4,372	29.84	
Greens	Theresa Slater	2,716	18.54	
Independent win		(new ward)		

== Moyne ==
2024 Moyne Shire Council election
- October 2024

All 7 seats on Moyne Shire Council 4 seats needed for a majority
Largest party before election
Independents
Subsequent largest party
Independents

Moyne Shire Council is composed of a single multi-member ward electing seven councillors.

=== Moyne results ===
2024 Victorian local elections: Moyne
Party	Candidate	Votes	%	±%
Independent	Jim Doukas (elected 1)	2,568	24.12	+8.23
Independent	Karen Foster (elected 2)	1,580	14.84	+7.96
Independent	Jordan Lockett (elected 3)	1,335	12.54	+3.85
Independent	Lisa Ryan (elected 4)	1,293	12.15	+12.15
Independent	Susan Taylor (elected 5)	1,085	10.19	+10.19
Independent	Myra Murrihy (elected 7)	767	7.21	+7.21
Independent	Lloyd Ross (elected 6)	732	6.88	+6.88
Independent	Maurice Molan	581	5.46	+5.46
Independent	Jonathan Ayres	365	3.43	+3.43
Independent	David Clark	339	3.18	+3.18
Independent	Kim Kelly (ineligible)	N/A	N/A	N/A
Total formal votes		10,645	96.85	+1.24
Informal votes		461	4.15	–1.34
Turnout		11,106	82.35	–2.94

== Queenscliffe ==
2024 Queenscliffe Borough Council election
- 26 October 2024

All 5 seats on Queenscliffe Borough Council 3 seats needed for a majority
- Registered: 3,351
- Turnout: 87.85% (▲0.74)
	First party	Second party
	IND	IND
Party	Independents	Ind. Liberal
Last election	3 seats	1 seat
Seats before	4	1
Seats won	3	2
Seat change	▼1	▲1
First preference vote	1,825	1,028
Percentage	63.97%	36.03%
Swing	▼13.47	▲23.05
Largest party before election
Independents
Subsequent largest party
Independents

Queenscliffe Borough Council is composed of a single multi-member ward electing five councillors.

On 8 March 2022, Independent Labor councillor Susan Salter resigned from council because of an ongoing illness. She died only eight days later on 16 March. The vacancy on council was filled by Isabelle Tolhurst via countback on 12 April 2022.

=== Queenscliffe results ===
2024 Victorian local elections: Queenscliffe
Party	Candidate	Votes	%	±%
Independent Liberal	Donnie Grigau (elected 1)	637	22.33	+9.35
Independent	Isabelle Tolhurst (elected 2)	507	17.77	+7.07
Independent	Brendan Monahan (elected 3)	476	16.68	+16.68
Independent Liberal	Di Rule (elected 4)	391	13.70	+13.70
Independent	Ross Ebbels	209	7.33	–14.42
Independent	Hélène Cameron (elected 5)	204	7.15	+7.15
Independent	Ralph Roob	118	4.14	+4.14
Independent	Rob Minty	98	3.43	–2.93
Independent	Peter Jewell	85	2.98	+2.98
Independent	David Orford	78	2.73	+2.73
Independent	Lucille Maria Colombo	50	1.75	+1.75
Total formal votes		2,853	96.91	+1.09
Informal votes		91	3.09	–1.09
Turnout		2,944	87.85	+0.74

== Southern Grampians ==
2024 Southern Grampians Shire Council election
- 26 October 2024

All 7 seats on Southern Grampians Shire Council 4 seats needed for a majority
	First party	Second party
	IND	AJP
Leader	N/A	Tam Ramsay
Party	Independents	Animal Justice
Last election	7 seats	Did not contest
Seats before	7	0
Seats won	7	0
Seat change	Steady	Steady
First preference vote	9,575	664
Percentage	93.51%	6.49%
Swing		▲6.49
Largest party before election
Independents
Subsequent largest party
Independents

Southern Grampians Shire Council is composed of a single multi-member ward electing seven councillors.

All successful candidates were independents. The Animal Justice Party was the only party to endorse a candidate, with Tam Ramsay narrowly missing out on being elected.

=== Southern Grampians results ===
2024 Victorian local elections: Southern Grampians
Party	Candidate	Votes	%	±%
Independent	Adam Campbell (elected 1)	1,896	18.52	
Independent	Katrina Rainsford (elected 2)	1,853	18.10	+9.49
Independent	Afton R. Barber (elected 3)	1,195	11.67	
Independent	Albert Calvano (elected 4)	1,010	9.86	+0.38
Independent	Helen Henry (elected 5)	1,000	9.77	−0.05
Independent	Jayne Manning (elected 6)	964	9.41	
Independent	Dennis Heslin (elected 7)	716	6.99	
Animal Justice	Tam Ramsay	664	6.49	
Independent	Lee-Ann Elmes	395	3.86	
Independent	James Leversha	327	3.19	
Independent	Sharon Jackson	219	2.14	
Total formal votes		10,239	95.32	+1.11
Informal votes		503	4.68	−1.11
Turnout		10,742	84.98	−1.37

== Surf Coast ==
2024 Surf Coast Shire Council election
- October 2024

All 9 seats on Surf Coast Shire Council 5 seats needed for a majority
- Registered: 30,125
- Turnout: 83.44%
	First party	Second party
	IND	BTB
Party	Independents	Back to Basics
Last election	5 seats	Did not exist
Seats before	5	1
Seats won	5	3 (Note: Including one endorsed Libertarian Party member and one independent Libertarian member.)
Seat change	Steady	▲2
First preference vote	12,164	5,604
Percentage	49.67%	22.88%
	Third party	Fourth party
		IND
Party	Greens	Ind. Labor
Last election	1 seat	2 seats
Seats before	1	2
Seats won	0	1
Seat change	▼1	▼1
First preference vote	4,284	2,437
Percentage	17.49%	9.95%
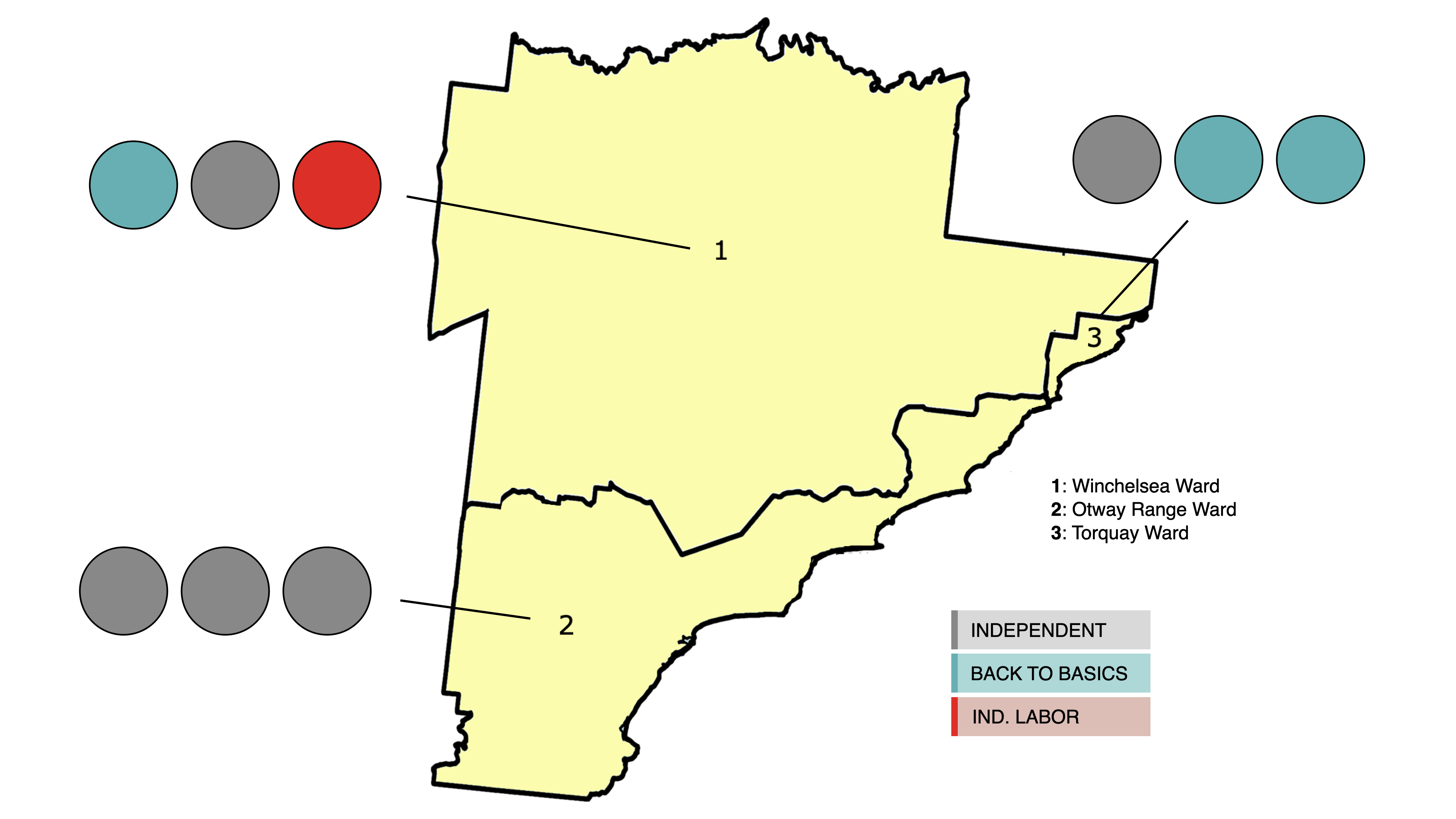
Largest party before election
Independents
Subsequent largest party
Independents

Surf Coast Shire Council is composed of three multi-member wards with three members each. Prior to the 2024 election, the council was composed of four multi-member wards (one single-member, two two-member and one four-member).

The "Surf Coast Back to Basics Team" has endorsed four candidates, including incumbent councillor Paul Barker (who has also been endorsed by the Libertarian Party).

=== Surf Coast results ===
2024 Victorian local elections: Surf Coast
Party	Votes	%	Swing	Seats	Change
Independent	12,164	49.67		5	Steady
Back to Basics Team	5,604	22.88	+22.88	3	▲3
Greens	4,284	17.49		0	▼1
Independent Labor	2,437	9.95		1	▼1
Formal votes	24,489	97.43			
Informal votes	648	2.57			
Total	25,137	100.0			
Registered voters / turnout	30,125	83.44			

=== Otway Range ===
2024 Victorian local elections: Otway Range Ward
Party	Candidate	Votes	%	±%
Independent	Libby Stapleton (elected 1)	2,615	32.35	+8.63 (Note: Compared to results in Anglesea Ward at the 2020 election.)
Independent	Leon Walker (elected 2)	2,220	27.47	+27.47
Independent	Mike Bodsworth (elected 3)	1,869	23.12	+0.85
Greens	Kate Gazzard	1,379	17.06	−2.07 (Note: Compared to results in Torquay Ward at the 2020 election.)
Total formal votes		8,083	98.37	
Informal votes		134	1.63	
Turnout		8,217	83.40	

=== Torquay ===
2024 Victorian local elections: Torquay Ward
Party	Candidate	Votes	%	±%
Independent	Liz Pattison (elected 1)	2,002	23.99	+7.53
Back to Basics Team	Rebecca Bourke (elected 2)	1,662	19.92	+19.92
Greens	Phoebe Crockett	1,501	17.99	−1.14
Back to Basics Team	Paul Barker (Note: Also a member of (and endorsed by) the Libertarian Party.) (elected 3)	1,421	17.03	+5.36
Back to Basics Team	Eric Menogue (Note: Also a member of the Liberal Party.)	910	10.91	+10.91
Independent	Martin Duke	848	10.16	+5.68
Total formal votes		8,344	97.25	+1.10
Informal votes		236	2.75	−1.10
Turnout		8,580	83.50	+0.01

=== Winchelsea ===
2024 Victorian local elections: Winchelsea Ward
Party	Candidate	Votes	%	±%
Back to Basics Team	Joel Grist (Note: Also a member of the Libertarian Party.) (elected 1)	1,611	19.98	+19.98
Independent	Tony Phelps (elected 2)	1,528	18.95	+1.21
Greens	Aleisja Henry	1,404	17.42	+17.42
Independent Labor	Rose Hodge	1,234	15.31	+1.24
Independent Labor	Adrian Schonfelder (elected 3)	1,203	14.92	−5.49
Independent	Darryl Wilson	1,082	13.42	+13.42
Total formal votes		8,062	96.67	−0.30
Informal votes		278	3.33	+0.30
Turnout		8,340	83.43	−2.08

== Warrnambool ==
2024 Warrnambool City Council election
- October 2024

All 7 seats on Warrnambool City Council 4 seats needed for a majority
Largest party before election
Independents
Subsequent largest party
Independents

Warrnambool City Council is composed of seven single-member wards. Prior to the 2024 election, it was composed of a single multi-member ward electing seven councillors, but the electoral structure has changed as a result of the Local Government Act 2020.

=== Warrnambool results ===
2024 Victorian local elections: Warrnambool
Party	Votes	%	Swing	Seats	Change
Independents	11,547	100.00	+0.0	7	Steady
Formal votes	11,547	95.77	+4.56		
Informal votes	510	4.23	–4.56		
Total	12,057	100.00		7	
Registered voters	26,851				

=== Botanic ===
2024 Victorian local elections: Botanic Ward
Party	Candidate	Votes	%	±%
Independent	Billy Edis	unopposed		
Registered electors		3,888		
Independent win		(new ward)		

=== Central ===
2024 Victorian local elections: Central Ward
Party	Candidate	Votes	%	±%
Independent	Debbie Arnott	1,698	57.68	
Independent	Peter Sycopoulis	1,246	42.32	
Total formal votes		2,944	96.21	
Informal votes		116	3.79	
Turnout		3,060	76.87	
Two-candidate-preferred result
Independent win		(new ward)		

=== Hopkins River ===
2024 Victorian local elections: Hopkins River Ward
Party	Candidate	Votes	%	±%
Independent	Willy Benter	1,937	68.45	
Independent	Jim Burke	893	31.55	
Total formal votes		2,830	95.22	
Informal votes		142	4.78	
Turnout		2,972	76.78	
Two-candidate-preferred result
Independent win		(new ward)		

=== Pertobe ===
2024 Victorian local elections: Pertobe Ward
Party	Candidate	Votes	%	±%
Independent	Matthew Walsh	1,136	40.86	
Independent	Peter Hulin	566	20.36	
Independent	Jennifer Lowe	546	19.64	
Independent	Leanne Williams	532	19.14	
Total formal votes		2,780	97.10	
Informal votes		83	2.90	
Turnout		2,863	78.61	
After distribution of preferences
Independent	Matthew Walsh	1,468	52.81	
Independent	Jennifer Lowe	679	24.42	
Independent	Peter Hulin	633	22.77	
Independent win		(new ward)		

=== Platypus Park ===
2024 Victorian local elections: Platypus Park Ward
Party	Candidate	Votes	%	±%
Independent	Vicki Jellie	2,216	74.04	
Independent	Andrew Squires	777	25.96	
Total formal votes		2,993	94.66	
Informal votes		169	5.34	
Turnout		3,162	77.14	
Independent win		(new ward)		

=== Russells Creek ===
2024 Victorian local elections: Russells Creek Ward
Party	Candidate	Votes	%	±%
Independent	Ben Blain	unopposed		
Registered electors		3,830		
Independent win		(new ward)		

=== Wollaston ===
2024 Victorian local elections: Wollaston Ward
Party	Candidate	Votes	%	±%
Independent	Richard Ziegeler	unopposed		
Registered electors		3,756		
Independent win		(new ward)		
