= Results of the 2020 Victorian local elections in Barwon South West =

2020 Victorian local elections (Barwon South West)
← 2016	24 October 2020	2024 →

This is a list of results for the 2020 Victorian local elections in the Barwon South West region.

Barwon South West has a population of around 450,000 and covers nine local government areas (LGAs), including the City of Greater Geelong.

== Colac Otway ==
=== Colac Otway results ===
2020 Victorian local elections: Colac Otway
Party	Candidate	Votes	%	±%
Independent Liberal	Joe McCracken (elected 1)	3,637	22.98	
Independent	Chris Potter (elected 2)	1,889	11.94	
Independent	Graham Costin (elected 3)	1,727	10.91	
Greens	Stephen Hart (elected 5)	1,528	9.66	
Independent	Kate Hanson (elected 4)	1,425	9.00	
Independent	Jamie Bell (elected 6)	1,251	7.91	
Independent	Tosh-Jake Finnigan	1,052	6.65	
Put Climate First	Susan Langridge	832	5.26	+5.26
Independent	Margaret White (elected 7)	678	4.28	
Independent	Catriona Ebeling	597	3.77	
Independent	Max Arnott	414	2.62	
Independent	Maxwell Clark	269	1.70	
Independent	Carol Lofts	264	1.67	
Independent	Mark McCallum	262	1.64	
Total formal votes		15,825	94.96	
Informal votes		840	5.04	
Turnout		16,665	84.61	

== Glenelg ==
2020 Victorian local elections: Glenelg
Party	Candidate	Votes	%	±%
Independent Labor	Gilbert Wilson (elected 1)	1,733	13.00	
Independent National	Anita Rank (elected 2)	1,702	12.76	
Independent	Karen Stephens (elected 3)	1,586	11.59	
Independent	Scott Martin (elected 4)	1,469	11.02	
Independent	Michael Carr (elected 5)	1,041	7.81	
Independent	Robyn McDonald	937	7.03	
Independent	Jayden Smith (elected 7)	935	7.01	
Independent	Chrissy Hawker (elected 6)	878	6.58	
Independent	John Northcott	812	6.09	
Independent	Geoff White	722	5.41	
Independent	Malcolm Alexander	531	3.98	
Independent	Alistair McDonald	464	3.48	
Independent	George Kozarevski	223	1.67	
Independent	David Wilson	171	1.28	
Independent	Alan Palmer	130	0.97	
Total formal votes		13,334	94.16	
Informal votes		927	5.84	
Turnout		14,161	83.98	

== Greater Geelong ==
=== Greater Geelong results ===
2020 Victorian local elections: Greater Geelong
Party	Votes	%	Swing	Seats	Change
Independent	58,513	35.52		4	
Independent Liberal	43,263	26.46		4	
Independent Labor	25,648	15.57		1	
Greens	17,081	10.37		1	
Put Climate First	12,518	7.60	+7.60	1	▲1
Socialist Alliance	4,292	2.61		0	Steady
Animal Justice	3,408	2.07		0	Steady
Formal votes	164,723				
Informal votes	7,474				
Total	172,197	100.00		11	
Registered voters / turnout	204,092	84.37			

=== Bellarine ===
2020 Victorian local elections: Bellarine Ward
Party	Candidate	Votes	%	±%
Independent Liberal	Stephanie Asher	17,149	35.66	
Independent Liberal	Trent Sullivan	5,580	11.60	
Independent Labor	Jim Mason	5,486	11.41	
Greens	Cory Wolverton	4,388	9.12	
Independent	Tom O’Connor	3,881	8.07	
Independent	Stephen Simmonds	3,615	7.52	
Put Climate First	Elise Wilkinson	3,397	7.06	
Independent	Tom Harrison	3,051	6.34	
Animal Justice	Naomi Adams	868	1.80	
Independent	Michael Fairweather	674	1.40	
Total formal votes		48,089	95.39	
Informal votes		2,324	4.61	
Turnout		50,413	85.24	
Independent Liberal hold		Swing		
Independent Liberal hold		Swing		
Independent Labor hold		Swing		

=== Brownbill ===
2020 Victorian local elections: Brownbill Ward
Party	Candidate	Votes	%	±%
Greens	Sarah Mansfield	10,412	23.12	
Independent	Peter Murrihy	6,914	15.35	
Independent Liberal	Eddy Kontelj	6,809	15.12	
Independent Liberal	Stretch Kontelj	6,593	14.64	
Independent Labor	Melissa Cadwell	5,360	11.90	
Independent	Jose Rodriguez	2,000	4.44	
Put Climate First	Sandi Dwyer	1,917	4.26	
Independent	Gabriel Wenyika	1,212	2.69	
Independent	Dean Hope	1,167	2.59	
Independent	Bernie Franke	1,021	2.27	
Independent Labor	Louis Hehir	984	2.19	
Independent Labor	Alex Csar	642	1.43	
Total formal votes		45,031	95.12	
Informal votes		2,309	4.88	
Turnout		47,340	83.95	
Greens hold		Swing		
Independent hold		Swing		
Independent Liberal hold		Swing		

=== Kardinia ===
2020 Victorian local elections: Kardinia Ward
Party	Candidate	Votes	%	±%
Independent	Bruce Harwood	8,781	19.76	
Independent Liberal	Ron Nelson	7,132	16.05	
Independent Labor	Jack Williams	4,113	9.25	
Put Climate First	Belinda Moloney	4,069	9.15	
Independent Labor	Andrew Alexander	4,063	9.14	
Independent	Pat Murnane	3,856	8.68	
Independent Labor	Andy Richards	2,916	6.56	
Animal Justice	Jen Gamble	2,540	5.71	
Greens	Anthony Hamilton-Smith	2,281	5.13	
Independent Labor	Atamjit Singh	2,084	4.69	
Independent	Michael Stangel	1,930	4.34	
Independent	Mark Brunger	684	1.54	
Total formal votes		44,449	95.68	
Informal votes		2,008	4.32	
Turnout		46,457	85.95	
Independent hold		Swing		
Independent Liberal hold		Swing		
Put Climate First gain from Independent		Swing		

=== Windermere ===
2020 Victorian local elections: Windermere Ward
Party	Candidate	Votes	%	±%
Independent	Anthony Aitken	10,525	38.76	
Independent	Kylie Grzybek	6,103	22.48	
Socialist Alliance	Sarah Hathway	4,292	15.81	
Put Climate First	Monique Connell	3,135	11.55	
Independent	Enamul Haque	3,099	11.41	
Total formal votes		27,154	97.02	
Informal votes		833	2.98	
Turnout		27,987	81.11	
Independent hold		Swing		
Independent hold		Swing		

== Queenscliffe ==
2020 Queenscliffe Borough Council election
← 2016	24 October 2020	2024 →

All 5 seats on Queenscliffe Borough Council 3 seats needed for a majority
	First party	Second party	Third party
	IND	IND	IND
Party	Independents	Ind. Liberal	Ind. Labor
Last election	4 seats	0 seats	1 seat
Seats before	4	0	1
Seats won	3	1	1
Seat change	▼1	▲1	Steady
First preference vote	2,678	449	331
Percentage	77.44%	12.98%	9.57%
Largest party before election
Independents
Subsequent largest party
Independents

Queenscliffe Borough Council is composed of a single multi-member ward electing five councillors.

=== Queenscliffe results ===
2020 Victorian local elections: Queenscliffe
Party	Candidate	Votes	%	±%
Independent	Ross Ebbels (elected 1)	752	21.75	
Independent Liberal	Donnie Grigau (elected 2)	449	12.98	
Independent	Michael Grout (elected 3)	434	12.55	
Independent	Isabelle Tolhurst	370	10.70	
Independent	Fleur Hewitt (elected 5)	363	10.50	
Independent Labor	Susan Salter (elected 4)	331	9.57	
Independent	Robert Minty	220	6.36	
Independent	Jacqui Pierce	209	6.04	
Independent	Geoffrey Mathews	160	4.63	
Independent	Zelda Walters	100	2.89	
Independent	Amanda Hoysted	70	2.02	
Total formal votes		3,458	95.82	
Informal votes		151	4.18	
Turnout		3,609	87.11	
