= List of acts of the Parliament of Victoria from 2020 =

This is a list of acts of the Parliament of Victoria, Australia for the year 2020.

== 2020 ==
Short title, or popular name	Citation	Royal assent
Long title
Melbourne Strategic Assessment (Environment Mitigation Levy) Act 2020	No. 1 of 2020	11 February 2020
An Act to impose a levy to fund measures to mitigate impacts on the environment caused by the development of land in Melbourne's growth corridors and to consequentially amend other Acts and for other purposes.
Local Government (Casey City Council) Act 2020	No. 2 of 2020	19 February 2020
An Act to dismiss the Casey City Council and to provide for a general election for that Council and for other purposes.
Building and Environment Protection Legislation Amendment Act 2020	No. 3 of 2020	
Energy Safety Legislation Amendment (Victorian Energy Safety Commission and Other Matters) Act 2020	No. 4 of 2020	
Gender Equality Act 2020	No. 5 of 2020	25 February 2020
An Act to require the public sector, Councils and universities to promote gender equality, to take positive action towards achieving gender equality, to establish the Public Sector Gender Equality Commissioner and for other purposes.
Road Safety and Other Legislation Amendment Act 2020	No. 6 of 2020	
Local Government (Whittlesea City Council) Act 2020	No. 7 of 2020	
Health Services Amendment (Mandatory Vaccination of Healthcare Workers) Act 2020	No. 8 of 2020	
Local Government Act 2020	No. 9 of 2020	24 March 2020
An Act to reform the law relating to local government in Victoria, to repeal the City of Greater Geelong Act 1993, (Note: City of Greater Geelong Act 1993 (No. 16 of 1993)) to amend the City of Melbourne Act 2001, (Note: City of Melbourne Act 2001 (No. 5 of 2001)) the Local Government Act 1989, (Note: Local Government Act 1989 (No. 11 of 1989)) the Victoria Grants Commission Act 1976 (Note: Victoria Grants Commission Act 1976 (No. 8887)) and the Victorian Independent Remuneration Tribunal and Improving Parliamentary Standards Act 2019, (Note: Victorian Independent Remuneration Tribunal and Improving Parliamentary Standards Act 2019 (No. 5 of 2019)) and to consequentially amend certain other Acts and for other purposes.
National Electricity (Victoria) Amendment Act 2020	No. 10 of 2020	
COVID-19 Omnibus (Emergency Measures) Act 2020	No. 11 of 2020	24 April 2020
An Act to temporarily amend certain Acts, and to temporarily empower the making of regulations, to modify the application of the law of Victoria in certain respects for the purpose of responding to the COVID-19 pandemic and for other purposes.
Appropriation (Interim) Act 2020	No. 12 of 2020	28 April 2020
An Act to make interim appropriation of certain sums out of the Consolidated Fund for services and supplies for the period commencing 1 January 2020 and ending on 31 December 2020.
Appropriation (Parliament) (Interim) Act 2020	No. 13 of 2020	28 April 2020
An Act to make interim appropriation of certain sums out of the Consolidated Fund for the Parliament for the period commencing on 1 July 2020 and ending on 31 December 2020.
State Taxation Acts Amendment (Relief Measures) Act 2020	No. 14 of 2020	
Assisted Reproductive Treatment Amendment Act 2020	No. 15 of 2020	
Crimes Amendment (Manslaughter and Related Offences) Act 2020	No. 16 of 2020	
Disability Service Safeguards Amendment Act 2020	No. 17 of 2020	
North East Link Act 2020	No. 18 of 2020	10 June 2020
An Act to establish the North East Link State Tolling Corporation in relation to the North East Link road, to provide for the operation and maintenance of the North East Link road and the imposition and enforcement of tolls in relation to the North East Link road, to make related and consequential amendments to other Acts and for other purposes.
Great Ocean Road and Environs Protection Act 2020	No. 19 of 2020	23 June 2020
An Act to recognise the importance of the landscapes and seascapes along the Great Ocean Road to the economic prosperity and liveability of Victoria and as one living and integrated natural entity for the purposes of protecting the region, to establish a Great Ocean Road Coast and Parks Authority to which various land management responsibilities are to be transferred and to make related and consequential amendments to other Acts and for other purposes.
Petroleum Legislation Amendment Act 2020	No. 20 of 2020	23 June 2020
Wage Theft Act 2020 or the Workforce Inspectorate Victoria Act 2020	No. 21 of 2020	23 June 2020
An Act to create offences relating to the theft of employee entitlements and the keeping of records relating to employee entitlements, to establish the Wage Inspectorate Victoria and for other purposes.
Justice Legislation Miscellaneous Amendments Act 2020	No. 22 of 2020	
Sentencing Amendment (Emergency Worker Harm) Act 2020	No. 23 of 2020	
Public Health and Wellbeing Amendment (State of Emergency Extension and Other Matters) Act 2020	No. 24 of 2020	
COVID-19 Commercial and Residential Tenancies Legislation Amendment (Extension) Act 2020	No. 25 of 2020	
Retail Leases Amendment Act 2020	No. 26 of 2020	
COVID-19 Omnibus (Emergency Measures) and Other Acts Amendment Act 2020	No. 27 of 2020	
National Energy Legislation Amendment Act 2020	No. 28 of 2020	
Police and Emergency Legislation Amendment Act 2020	No. 29 of 2020	
Project Development and Construction Management Amendment Act 2020	No. 30 of 2020	
Cladding Safety Victoria Act 2020	No. 31 of 2020	4 November 2020
An Act to establish a body corporate called Cladding Safety Victoria for the purposes of administering a cladding rectification program and to make related amendments to the Building Act 1993 (Note: Building Act 1993 (No. 126 of 1993)) and the Public Administration Act 2004 (Note: Public Administration Act 2004 (No. 108 of 2004)) and for other purposes.
Consumer Legislation Amendment Act 2020	No. 32 of 2020	
Education and Training Reform Amendment (Regulation of Student Accommodation) Act 2020	No. 33 of 2020	
Worker Screening Act 2020	No. 34 of 2020	4 November 2020
An Act to provide for the screening of persons working with or caring for children or providing supports or services to persons with a disability under the National Disability Insurance Scheme, to repeal the Working with Children Act 2005 (Note: Working with Children Act 2005 (No. 57 of 2005)) and for other purposes.
Justice Legislation Amendment (Supporting Victims and Other Matters) Act 2020	No. 35 of 2020	
Safe Patient Care (Nurse to Patient and Midwife to Patient Ratios) Amendment Act 2020	No. 36 of 2020	
Energy Legislation Amendment (Licence Conditions) Act 2020	No. 37 of 2020	
Food Amendment Act 2020	No. 38 of 2020	
Marine Safety Amendment (Better Boating Fund) Act 2020	No. 39 of 2020	
Parks and Crown Land Legislation Amendment Act 2020	No. 40 of 2020	
Transport Legislation Amendment Act 2020	No. 41 of 2020	1 December 2020
An Act to amend the Accident Towing Services Act 2007, (Note: Accident Towing Services Act 2007 (No. 30 of 2007)) the Heavy Vehicle National Law Application Act 2013, (Note: Heavy Vehicle National Law Application Act 2013 (No. 30 of 2013)) the Rail Management Act 1996, (Note: Rail Corporations Act 1996 (No. 79 of 1996)) the Road Management Act 2004, (Note: Road Management Act 2004 (No. 12 of 2004)) the Road Safety Act 1986, (Note: Road Safety Act 1986 (No. 127 of 1986)) the Transport (Compliance and Miscellaneous) Act 1983, (Note: Transport Act 1983 (No. 9921)) the Transport Integration Act 2010 (Note: Transport Integration Act 2010 (No. 6 of 2010)) and the Transport Legislation Amendment Act 2019 (Note: Transport Legislation Amendment Act 2019 (No. 49 of 2019)) and for other purposes.
Human Tissue Amendment Act 2020	No. 42 of 2020	
Justice Legislation Amendment (Drug Court and Other Matters) Act 2020	No. 43 of 2020	
Public Health and Wellbeing Amendment (Quarantine Fees) Act 2020	No. 44 of 2020	
Appropriation (2020-2021) Act 2020	No. 45 of 2020	15 December 2020
An Act for the appropriation of certain sums out of the Consolidated Fund for the ordinary annual services of the Government for the financial year 2020/2021 and for other purposes.
Appropriation (Parliament 2020-2021) Act 2020	No. 46 of 2020	15 December 2020
An Act for the appropriation of certain sums out of the Consolidated Fund for the Parliament in respect of the financial year 2020/2021 and for other purposes.
State Taxation Acts Amendment Act 2020	No. 47 of 2020	15 December 2020
An Act to amend the Duties Act 2000, (Note: Duties Act 2000 (No. 79 of 2000)) the Land Tax Act 2005, (Note: Land Tax Act 2005 (No. 88 of 2005)) the Payroll Tax Act 2007 (Note: Payroll Tax Act 2007 (No. 26 of 2007)) and the Valuation of Land Act 1960 (Note: Valuation of Land Act 1960 (No. 6653)) and for other purposes.

== Sources ==
- "Acts as made: 2020". Victoria Legislation.
