= Results of the 2024 Victorian local elections in Gippsland =

2024 Victorian local elections (Gippsland)
- October 2024

This is a list of results for the 2024 Victorian local elections in the Gippsland region.

Gippsland has a population of around 310,000 and covers six local government areas (LGAs), including the City of Latrobe.

== Bass Coast ==
2024 Bass Coast Shire Council election
- 26 October 2024

All 9 seats on Bass Coast Shire Council 5 seats needed for a majority
Largest party before election
Independents
Subsequent largest party
Independents

Bass Coast Shire Council is composed of three multi-member wards with three members each.

Although the party did not explicitly endorse candidates in Bass Coast, the local Labor Party branch published a letter encouraging people to support Labor member Leticia Laing in Bunurong Ward. Labor branch secretary Tully Fletcher also encouraged support for "Labor-aligned" independent candidate Caitlyn Robertson and Greens candidate Mat Morgan in Bunurong, as well as independent John Temby in Westernport Ward.

=== Bass Coast results ===
2024 Victorian local elections: Bass Coast
Party	Votes	%	Swing	Seats	Change
Independent	21,070	74.92	+27.24	6	Steady
Independent National	2,428	8.63	−10.23	1	Steady
Greens	1,784	6.34	+1.48	1	▲1
Independent Labor	1,532	5.45	−7.25	0	▼1
Independent Liberal	1,310	4.66	−9.11	1	Steady
Formal votes	28,124	96.02	−0.89		
Informal votes	1,165	3.98	+0.89		
Total	29,289	100.00		9	Steady
Registered voters / turnout	35,398	82.74	+1.09		

=== Bunurong ===
2024 Victorian local elections: Bunurong Ward
Party	Candidate	Votes	%	±%
Independent National	Brett Tessari (elected 1)	2,428	25.45	−24.46
Greens	Mat Morgan (elected 3)	1,784	18.70	+5.86
Independent Labor	Leticia Laing	1,532	16.06	−1.27
Independent	Meg Edwards (elected 2)	1,216	12.75	
Independent	Brian Robinson	726	7.61	
Independent	Caitlyn Robertson	614	6.44	
Independent	Les Larke	512	5.37	−5.02
Independent	Prudence Scholtes	422	4.42	
Independent	Eddie Halaijian	306	3.21	
Total formal votes		9,540	95.72	−1.63
Informal votes		427	4.28	+1.63
Turnout		9,967	84.26	+0.78

=== Island ===
2024 Victorian local elections: Island Ward
Party	Candidate	Votes	%	±%
Independent	Ron Bauer (elected 1)	3,220	33.78	+11.62
Independent	Tim O'Brien (elected 3)	1,290	13.53	
Independent	Marnie Chadwick	1,193	12.52	
Independent	Tracey Bell (elected 2)	1,129	11.85	
Independent	David Rooks	1,096	11.50	−9.63
Independent	John Trigt (Note: Also a member of an undisclosed political party, although it is not the Greens and it does not appear to be the Labor Party.)	915	9.60	
Independent	Darrell Silva	688	7.22	+4.08
Total formal votes		9,531	96.49	+0.59
Informal votes		347	3.51	−0.59
Turnout		9,878	81.72	+1.07

=== Western Port ===
2024 Victorian local elections: Western Port Ward
Party	Candidate	Votes	%	±%
Independent	Rochelle Halstead (elected 1)	2,877	31.78	+5.33
Independent	Jon Temby (elected 2)	1,560	17.23	
Independent Liberal	Jan Thompson (elected 3)	1,310	14.47	
Independent	Nikole Schellekens	1,176	12.90	
Independent	Brian O'Farrell	1,094	12.08	
Independent	Glenda Minty	1,036	11.44	
Total formal votes		9,053	95.86	−1.48
Informal votes		391	4.14	+1.48
Turnout		9,444	82.25	+1.72

== Baw Baw ==
2024 Baw Baw Shire Council election
- 26 October 2024
- All 9 seats on Baw Baw Shire Council; 5 seats needed for a majority
- Turnout: 83.72%
Party	Vote %	Seats	+/–
Independents	100.0	9	0
This lists parties that won seats. See the complete results below.

Baw Baw Shire Council is composed of three multi-member wards with three members each.

=== Baw Baw results ===
2024 Victorian local elections: Baw Baw
Party	Votes	%	Swing	Seats	Change
Independent	36,299	100.00		9	Steady
Formal votes	36,299	96.17			
Informal votes	1,445	3.83			
Total	37,744	100.00		9	Steady
Registered voters / turnout	45,084	83.72			

=== Central ===
2024 Victorian local elections: Central Ward
Party	Candidate	Votes	%	±%
Independent	Danny Goss (elected 1)	4,696	38.04	+8.41
Independent	Paul Pratt (elected 2)	2,679	21.70	
Independent	Jackie Shearer	1,216	9.85	
Independent	Suzanne Allen (elected 3)	1,211	9.81	
Independent	Farhat Firdous	779	6.31	−7.39
Independent	Jules Cole	767	6.21	
Independent	Denise Azar	535	4.33	
Independent	Rochelle Hine	463	3.75	
Total formal votes		12,346	96.06	−1.53
Informal votes		506	3.94	+1.53
Turnout		12,852	83.37	−1.22

=== East ===
2024 Victorian local elections: East Ward
Party	Candidate	Votes	%	±%
Independent	Adam Sheehan (elected 2)	2,359	19.05	
Independent	Brendan Kingwill (elected 1)	2,223	17.95	
Independent	Kate Wilson (elected 3)	1,999	16.15	
Independent	Michael Leaney	1,918	15.49	−19.21
Independent	Darren Wallace	1,728	13.96	−1.41
Independent	Roy Lindsay	884	7.14	
Independent	Leni Teng	1,027	8.29	
Independent	Jannette Langley	243	1.96	
Total formal votes		12,381	96.08	−0.15
Informal votes		505	3.92	+0.15
Turnout		12,886	85.50	+0.12

=== West ===
2024 Victorian local elections: West Ward
Party	Candidate	Votes	%	±%
Independent	Ben Lucas (elected 1)	5,265	45.50	−0.07
Independent	Jess Hamilton (elected 2)	2,424	20.95	
Independent	Annemarie McCabe	1,213	10.48	−5.75
Independent	Tricia Jones (elected 3)	946	8.17	−11.66
Independent	Michael Fozard	673	5.82	
Independent	Brenda McDermott	539	4.66	
Independent	Maz Byrne	512	4.42	
Total formal votes		11,572	96.39	−0.94
Informal votes		434	3.61	+0.94
Turnout		12,006	82.25	+0.40

== East Gippsland ==
2024 East Gippsland Shire Council election
- October 2024

All 9 seats on East Gippsland Shire Council 5 seats needed for a majority
Largest party before election
Independents
Subsequent largest party
Independents

East Gippsland Shire Council is composed of a single multi-member ward electing nine councillors.

=== East Gippsland results ===
2024 Victorian local elections: East Gippsland
Party	Candidate	Votes	%	±%
Independent	Sonia Buckley (elected 1)	3,684	12.94	+4.50
Independent	John White (elected 2)	3,141	11.03	+4.63
Independent	Bernie Farquhar (elected 3)	2,506	8.80	
Independent	Arthur Allen (elected 4)	2,220	7.80	−0.50
Independent	Ian Trevaskis (elected 5)	1,759	6.18	
Independent	Tom Crook (elected 6)	1,599	5.62	+0.99
Independent	Barry Davis (elected 8)	1,447	5.08	
Independent Labor	Mark Reeves	1,427	5.01	+0.02
Independent	Joanne Eastman (elected 9)	1,406	4.94	
Independent	James Nicholas	1,289	4.53	
Independent	Jodie Ashworth (elected 7)	1,255	4.41	
Independent	Valerie Curtis	1,058	3.72	
Independent	Jes John	827	2.91	
Independent	Judy Ireland	782	2.75	
Independent	Clive Bury	741	2.60	
Independent	Sasha Kruse	689	2.42	
Independent	Susie Bady	574	2.02	
Independent	Janice Coates	506	1.78	
Independent	Steven Columbus	500	1.76	
Independent	Cheryl Jakobi	474	1.67	
Independent	Suzanne Davies	291	1.02	
Independent	Aly Nichol	290	1.02	
Independent	Matt Stephenson (ineligible) (Note: Candidate was ineligible to contest the election after not completing mandatory candidate training. They still appeared on the ballot as they were only "retired" by the Victorian Electoral Commission after ballot papers had been printed, however they could not serve as a councillor and their votes were distributed to other candidates according to voters' preferences.)	N/A	N/A	
Total formal votes		28,465	87.72	−2.32
Informal votes		3,984	12.28	+2.32
Turnout		32,449	82.31	−0.40

== Latrobe ==
2024 Latrobe City Council election
- October 2024

All 9 seats on Latrobe City Council 5 seats needed for a majority
Largest party before election
Independents
Subsequent largest party
Independents

Latrobe City Council is composed of nine single-member wards. Prior to the 2024 election, it was composed of four multi-member wards (one single-member, two two-member and one four-member), but the electoral structure has changed as a result of the Local Government Act 2020.

=== Latrobe results ===
2024 Victorian local elections: Latrobe
Party	Votes	%	Swing	Seats	Change
Independents	31,397	81.28		7	▲1
Independent National	2,747	7.11		1	Steady
Independent Liberal	2,463	6.36		1	Steady
Independent Labor	2,023	5.24		0	▼1
Formal votes	38,630	95.43			
Informal votes	1,851	4.57			
Total	40,481	100.00		9	Steady
Registered voters / turnout	58,168				

=== Boola Boola ===
2024 Victorian local elections: Boola Boola Ward
Party	Candidate	Votes	%	±%
Independent	David Barnes	2,709	58.21	
Independent	Kellie O'Callaghan	1,945	41.79	
Total formal votes		4,654	96.42	
Informal votes		173	3.58	
Turnout		4,827	82.30	
Independent win		(new ward)		

=== Budgeree ===
2024 Victorian local elections: Budgeree Ward
Party	Candidate	Votes	%	±%
Independent	Leanne Potter	3,406	66.29	
Independent	Melissa Ferguson	1,732	33.71	
Total formal votes		5,138	95.24	
Informal votes		257	4.76	
Turnout		5,395	79.47	
Independent win		(new ward)		

=== Jeeralang ===
2024 Victorian local elections: Jeeralang Ward
Party	Candidate	Votes	%	±%
Independent	Joanne Mary Campbell	2,459	44.69	
Independent	Peter Duncan	2,246	40.82	
Independent	Alex Maidana	797	14.49	
Total formal votes		5,502	96.42	
Informal votes		204	3.58	
Turnout		5,706	81.85	
Two-candidate-preferred result
Independent	Joanne Mary Campbell	2,862	52.02	
Independent	Peter Duncan	2,640	47.98	
Independent win		(new ward)		

=== Loy Yang ===
2024 Victorian local elections: Loy Yang Ward
Party	Candidate	Votes	%	±%
Independent Liberal	Dale Harriman	2,463	50.84	
Independent	Jimmy Ware	1,463	30.20	
Independent	Paul Howden	919	18.97	
Total formal votes		4,845	96.26	
Informal votes		188	3.74	
Turnout		5,033	78.51	
After distribution of preferences
Independent Liberal win		(new ward)		

=== Moe ===
2024 Victorian local elections: Moe Ward
Party	Candidate	Votes	%	±%
Independent	Adele Pugsley	2,876	61.77	
Independent	Guss Lambden	1,780	38.23	
Total formal votes		4,656	93.51	
Informal votes		323	6.49	
Turnout		4,979	74.60	
Independent win		(new ward)		

=== Morwell River ===
2024 Victorian local elections: Morwell River Ward
Party	Candidate	Votes	%	±%
Independent	Tracie Lund	2,352	50.99	
Independent	John Ellingham	1,731	37.52	
Independent	Dorothy L. Long	530	11.49	
Total formal votes		4,613	96.43	
Informal votes		171	3.57	
Turnout		4,784	73.85	
After distribution of preferences
Independent win		(new ward)		

==== 2026 Morwell River Ward by-election ====
2026 Morwell River Ward by-election (13–31 July 2026)
Party	Candidate	Votes	%	±%
Independent	Rob Moffatt	1,565	35.90	+35.90
Independent	Dean Sutton	974	22.34	+22.34
Independent	John Ellingham	752	17.25	−20.27
Independent	Guss Lambden	635	14.57	+14.57
Independent	Graham Lougheed	433	9.93	+9.93
Total formal votes		4,359	97.00	+0.57
Informal votes		135	3.00	−0.57
Turnout		4,494	69.16	−4.69
Two-candidate-preferred result
Independent	Rob Moffatt	2,527	57.97	+57.97
Independent	Dean Sutton	1,832	42.03	+42.03
Independent gain from Independent		Swing	+57.97	

- By-election held after the resignation of sitting councillor Tracie Lund.

=== Newborough ===
2024 Victorian local elections: Newborough Ward
Party	Candidate	Votes	%	±%
Independent	Sharon Gibson	unopposed		
Registered electors		6,541		
Independent win		(new ward)		

=== Tyers ===
2024 Victorian local elections: Tyers Ward
Party	Candidate	Votes	%	±%
Independent National	Darren Howe	2,747	53.11	
Independent	David Little	2,425	46.89	
Total formal votes		5,172	95.28	
Informal votes		256	4.72	
Turnout		5,428	82.47	
Independent National win		(new ward)		

=== Yallourn ===
2024 Victorian local elections: Yallourn Ward
Party	Candidate	Votes	%	±%
Independent	Steph Morgan	2,027	50.05	
Independent Labor	Graeme Laurence Middlemiss	2,023	49.95	
Total formal votes		4,050	93.56	
Informal votes		279	6.44	
Turnout		4,329	73.91	
Independent win		(new ward)		

== South Gippsland ==
2024 South Gippsland Shire Council election
- October 2024

All 9 seats on South Gippsland Shire Council 5 seats needed for a majority
Largest party before election
Independents
Subsequent largest party
Independents

South Gippsland Shire Council is composed of three multi-member wards with three members each.

=== South Gippsland results ===
2024 Victorian local elections: South Gippsland
Party	Votes	%	Swing	Seats	Change
Independent	18,180	87.51	+0.49	8	Steady
Independent Liberal	1,978	9.52	+3.59	1	Steady
Greens	617	2.97	−4.08	0	Steady
Formal votes	20,775	97.37	+0.90		
Informal votes	561	2.63	−0.90		
Total	21,336	100.00		9	Steady
Registered voters / turnout	24,875	85.77	+4.26		

=== Coastal-Promontory ===
2024 Victorian local elections: Coastal-Promontory Ward
Party	Candidate	Votes	%	±%
Independent	Scott Rae (elected 1)	1,928	28.22	+8.51
Independent	Sarah Gilligan (elected 2)	1,831	26.80	
Independent	Steve Finlay (elected 3)	1,575	23.06	
Independent	Emma McKay	1,084	15.87	
Independent	Michael R. Poore	413	6.05	
Total formal votes		6,831	97.57	+0.17
Informal votes		170	2.43	−0.17
Turnout		7,001	85.10	+7.25

=== Strzelecki ===
2024 Victorian local elections: Strzelecki Ward
Party	Candidate	Votes	%	±%
Independent Liberal	Nathan Hersey (elected 1)	1,978	27.34	+11.00
Independent	John Kennedy (elected 3)	1,747	24.14	
Independent	Bron Beach (elected 2)	1,679	23.20	
Independent	Jim Forbes	993	13.72	−2.90
Independent	Jenni Keerie	839	11.59	−11.65
Total formal votes		7,236	97.45	+1.38
Informal votes		189	2.55	−1.38
Turnout		7,425	86.71	+4.20

=== Tarwin Valley ===
2024 Victorian local elections: Tarwin Valley Ward
Party	Candidate	Votes	%	±%
Independent	John Schelling (elected 1)	2,405	35.85	+5.44
Independent	Clare Williams (elected 2)	1,805	26.91	+5.15
Independent	Don Hill	857	12.78	+4.44
Greens	Rosemary Anne Cousin	617	9.20	−0.17
Independent	Brad Snell (elected 3)	524	7.81	
Independent	Kathleen Murray	263	3.92	
Independent	Aaron Taylor	237	3.53	
Total formal votes		6,708	97.08	+0.92
Informal votes		202	2.92	−0.92
Turnout		6,910	85.47	+1.94

== Wellington ==
2024 Wellington Shire Council election
- October 2024

All 9 seats on Wellington Shire Council 5 seats needed for a majority
Largest party before election
Independents
Subsequent largest party
Independents

Wellington Shire Council is composed of three multi-member wards with three members each.

=== Wellington results ===
2024 Victorian local elections: Wellington
Party	Votes	%	Swing	Seats	Change
Independent	22,554	82.29		8	Steady
Independent Liberal	3,789	13.82		1	Steady
Libertarian	1,066	3.89		0	Steady
Formal votes	27,409	96.90			
Informal votes	876	3.10			
Total	28,285	100.00		9	Steady
Registered voters / turnout	34,651	81.63			

=== Central ===
2024 Victorian local elections: Central Ward
Party	Candidate	Votes	%	±%
Independent Liberal	Scott Rossetti (elected 1)	3,789	39.11	+18.79
Independent	Liz Foat (elected 2)	3,173	32.76	
Independent	Geoff Wells (elected 3)	1,659	17.13	
Libertarian	Jacob Veldhuizen	1,066	11.00	
Total formal votes		9,687	97.82	+1.16
Informal votes		216	2.18	−1.16
Turnout		9,903	79.86	−0.60

=== Coastal ===
2024 Victorian local elections: Coastal Ward
Party	Candidate	Votes	%	±%
Independent	Garry Stephens (elected 1)	2,341	27.07	−14.97
Independent	Cindy Madeley (elected 2)	1,928	22.30	
Independent	Catherine Bannerman (elected 3)	1,370	15.84	
Independent	Paul Mayer	1,203	13.91	
Independent	Marcus McKenzie	1,174	13.58	−8.64
Independent	Robin Albert Sidebotham	631	7.30	
Total formal votes		8,647	96.16	−1.05
Informal votes		345	3.84	+1.05
Turnout		8,992	83.29	+12.52

=== Northern ===
2024 Victorian local elections: Northern Ward
Party	Candidate	Votes	%	±%
Independent	Edward Lowe (elected 1)	3,004	33.10	
Independent	Carmel Ripper (elected 2)	1,574	17.34	+4.77
Independent	John Tatterson (elected 3)	1,424	15.69	−12.62
Independent	Kevin Christensen	1,363	15.02	
Independent	Cameron Jamie Hogan	1,108	12.21	
Independent	Christos Iliopoulos	602	6.63	−4.12
Total formal votes		9,075	96.65	−0.83
Informal votes		315	3.35	+0.83
Turnout		9,390	81.98	−0.89
