= 2024 Victorian local elections =

Local elections in Australia

- 26 October 2024

78 of the 79 local government areas in Victoria (647 of the 656 councillors in Victoria)
- Registered: 4,532,506

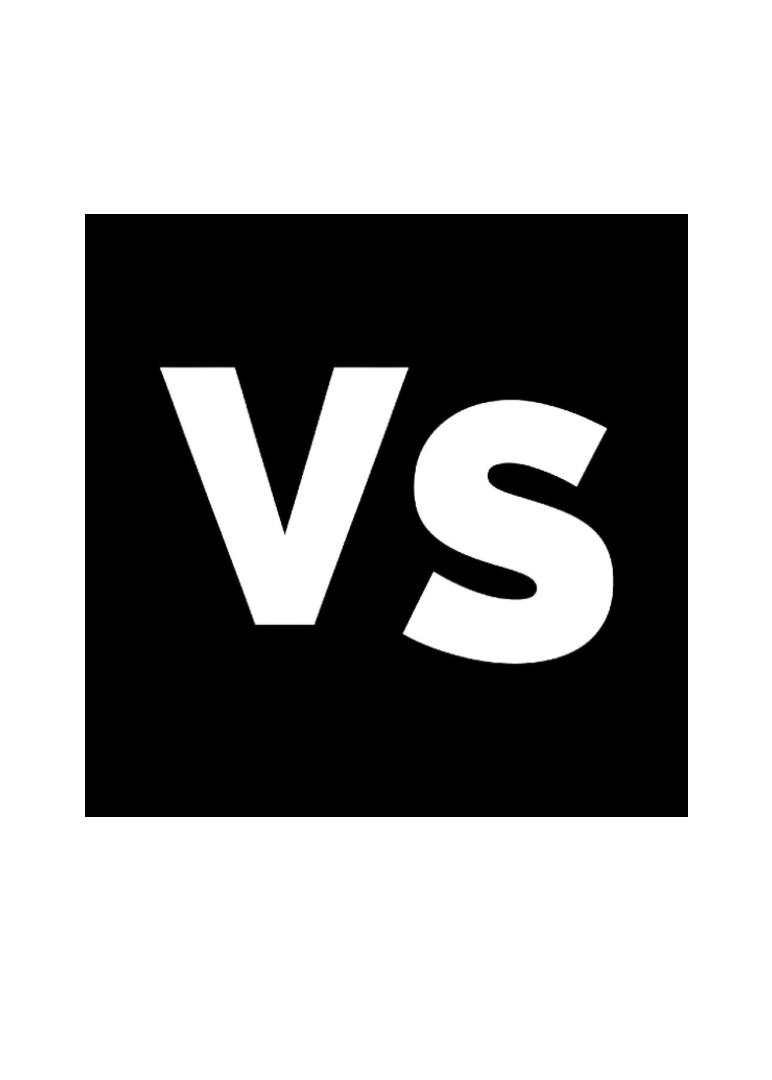

	First party	Second party	Third party
	IND
Party	Independents	Greens	Labor
Last election	566 seats	36 seats	13 seats
Seats before	586	28 (Note: Amanda Stone (Yarra), James Conlan (Merri-bek), Anab Mohamud (Yarra), Anjalee de Silva (Monash), Josh Fergeus (Monash) and Sam Spinks (Greater Shepparton) left the Greens between 2023 and 2024. Gabrielle de Vietri (Yarra), Sarah Mansfield (Greater Geelong), and Katherine Copsey (Port Phillip) were elected to the Parliament of Victoria in 2022. David Zyngier (Glen Eira) died in 2023. However, Sue Pennicuik was elected via countback in Glen Eira in 2022, and Tim Drylie (Hepburn) joined the party sometime after the 2020 elections.)	12 (Note: Milad El-Halabi (Moreland/Merri-bek) had his Labor membership suspended in 2022 and subsequently resigned from council. Sarah Carter (Maribyrnong) died in 2024. The party did not re-endorse any candidates in Maribyrnong, including incumbent Labor councillors Cuc Lam, Michael Clark and Anthony Tran (who joined the party in 2023). However, Robbie Nyaguy was elected via countback in Port Phillip in 2023, Rose Iser (Moonee Valley) joined the party ahead of the 2024 elections, and the party endorsed candidates (including councillor Emily Dimitriadis) in Darebin after not doing so in 2020.)
Seats won	457	28	20
Seat change		Steady	▲8
Primary vote	2,093,674	201,189	121,013
Percentage	60.29%	5.79%	3.45%
	Fourth party	Fifth party	Sixth party
		LP
Party	Socialists	Libertarian	Liberal
Last election	1 seat	2 seats	Did not contest
Seats before	1	2	0
Seats won	1	2 (Note: Including Paul Barker (Surf Coast) who was endorsed by the Libertarian Party but contested the election with the Back to Basics Team.)	1
Seat change	Steady	Steady	▲1
Primary vote	67,296	18,449	12,841
Percentage	1.94%	0.53%	0.37%
	Seventh party	Eighth party	Ninth party
	SA	AJP	FUS
Party	Socialist Alliance	Animal Justice	Fusion
Last election	1 seat	2 seats	0 seats (Note: Although the Fusion Party was not formed until 2021, one of Fusion's member parties − Save The Planet − contested the 2020 elections.)
Seats before	3 (Note: Monica Harte was elected to Moreland City Council (now Merri-bek) via countback in 2022, and Sarah Hathway was elected to Greater Geelong City Council via countback in 2023.)	1 (Note: Charlie Vincent resigned from Alpine Shire Council in 2021.)	0
Seats won	1	0	0
Seat change	▼2	▼1	Steady
Primary vote	12,771	5,618	351
Percentage	0.37%	0.16%	0.01%
Swing			▲0.01

The 2024 Victorian local elections were held on 26 October 2024 to elect the councils of 78 of the 79 local government areas (LGAs) in Victoria. The elections were conducted by the Victorian Electoral Commission (VEC), with voting taking place via post throughout October to elect 647 councillors across the state.

New councillors were elected in Casey and Whittlesea for the first time since 2016 after the councils were dismissed in February and March 2020 respectively.

39 councils were affected by the Local Government Act 2020, which will see a large number of multi-member wards replaced with single-member wards. This significantly increases the number of wards but will likely reduce the average number of candidates standing in these wards.

No election was held for Moira Shire after the council was dismissed in March 2023 and a panel of administrators was appointed. The next election for Moira is scheduled to be held in October 2028.

== Background ==
In February 2022, Labor councillor Milad El-Halabi resigned from Moreland City Council after being charged with conspiracy to cheat and defraud for allegedly tampering with the council elections. He was replaced via countback in March 2022 by Socialist Alliance's Monica Harte.

On 31 March 2023, the Victorian Civil and Administrative Tribunal found that El-Halabi was unduly elected. He has denied all allegations.

=== Greens resignations ===
The Greens have had five of its councillors resign from the party since the 2020 elections, and a further four seats have been lost due to resignations and deaths, reducing its total number from 36 to 28 as of July 2024.

James Conlan (Merri-bek) left the party in solidarity with senator Lidia Thorpe, Amanda Stone (Yarra) resigned in February 2023, and Anab Mohamud (Yarra) resigned in February 2024.

In April 2024, both Greens councillors in Monash − Anjalee de Silva and Josh Fergeus − left the party.

== Electoral system ==
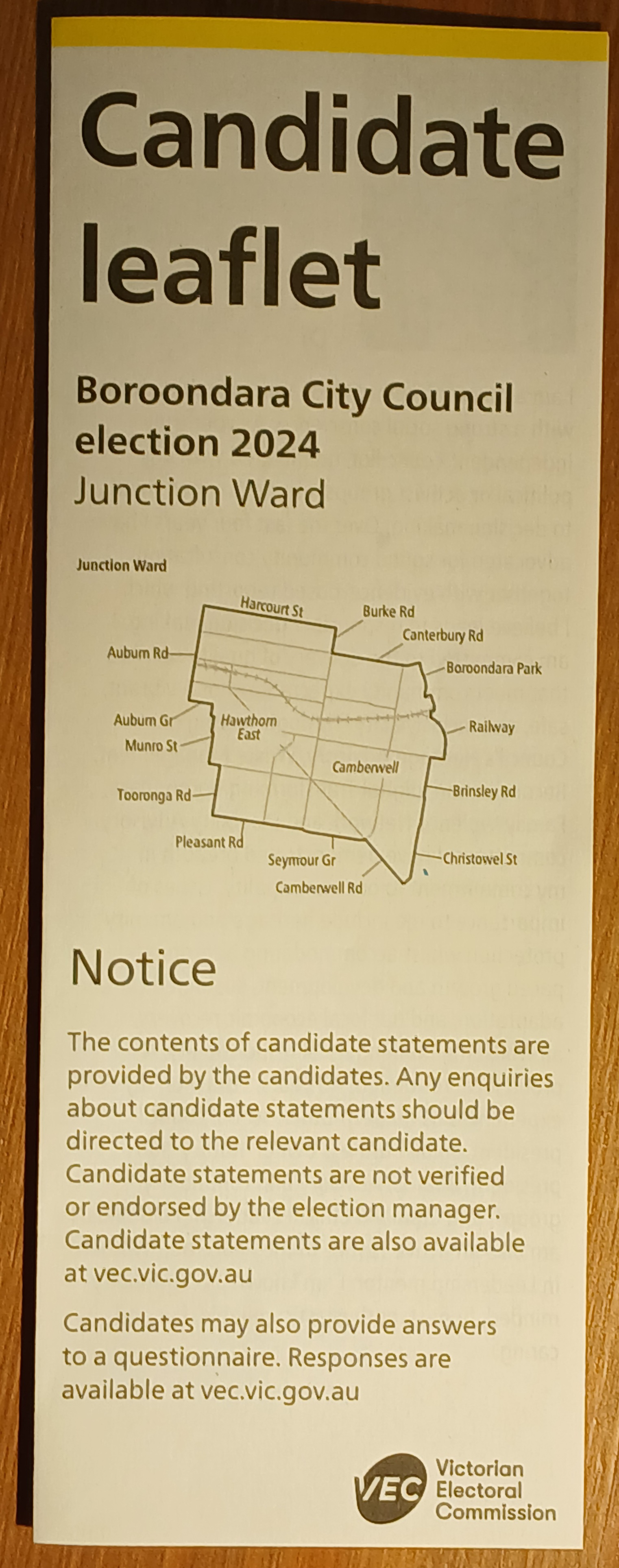
Leaflets containing information about each candidate were mailed to the appropriate wards for all voters. Pictured here is the front page of the leaflet for the Junction Ward in Boroondara.

Like in state and federal elections, Victorian local elections use full preferential voting, meaning voters must number every candidate. With the exception of Melbourne City Council, which has a "Leadership Team" election (consisting of a lord mayor and deputy lord mayor), mayors are not directly-elected and are instead chosen by councillors.

=== Business vote in Melbourne ===
Corporations, owners and occupiers of rateable properties are entitled to vote in Melbourne City Council elections, with two voters who are not residents of the City of Melbourne automatically enrolled in relation to the majority of these such entitlements: the only LGA in Victoria where this is the case. Non-resident voters do not have to be Australian citizens.

At the 2020 election, the Melbourne City Council electoral roll was composed of 55.1% non-resident corporate and rateable property-owning and -occupying voters, with local residents making up the remaining 44.9%.

A similar electoral system in New South Wales previously applied to Sydney City Council, where businesses were each entitled to two voters - though these non-resident voters formed a much smaller proportion of the overall electoral roll compared to Melbourne. This was introduced in 2014 but abolished in 2023 ahead of the 2024 election.

== Political parties ==
The Greens endorse all candidates for local elections, while Labor Party members can either be formally endorsed or stand as "non-endorsed, supported candidates" (otherwise referred to as Independent Labor).

The Liberal Party typically does not endorse candidates; however, the party has an endorsed ticket for the Melbourne City Council leadership team (lord mayor and deputy lord mayor) for the first time in party history. Local party branches also often make their own endorsements.

The Animal Justice Party, Fusion Party, Libertarian Party, Socialist Alliance and Victorian Socialists are endorsed candidates.

Analysis by The Age found that 47% of candidates in Greater Melbourne were members of a political party, including both endorsed and non-endorsed candidates.

=== Endorsed candidates ===
- Animal Justice Party − 10 candidates
- Fusion Party − 1 candidate
- Labor Party − 54 candidates
- Liberal Party − 4 candidates
- Libertarian Party − 16 candidates
- Socialist Alliance − 6 candidates
- The Greens − 124 candidates
- Victorian Socialists − 79 candidates

== Candidates ==
A total of 2,231 people nominated to contest the elections − 45 more than the amount that contested the 2020 elections. More than 60 candidates were Greek Australians.

=== Mandatory candidate training ===
All candidates in Victorian local elections are required to complete mandatory training to "help [candidates] understand the role and responsibilities of being a councillor". This requirement was introduced at the 2020 elections as a result of the Local Government Act 2020, and candidates who do not complete the training are ineligible to nominate. No other state has these requirements for any elections.

Following the close of nominations, the VEC announced that four candidates were "retired" after it was found they had not completed the required training. These candidates were retired prior to ballot papers being printed, and did not appear on any ballots.

However, a further 16 candidates were retired after 30 September 2024, which was after ballot papers had been printed. This means that while they remained on the ballot, they were not eligible to serve as a councillor and their votes were distributed to other candidates according to voters' preferences.

The retirements brought the total number of candidates down to 2,211.

== Party changes before elections ==
A number of councillors joined or left parties before the 2024 elections, including three councillors who joined the Victorians Party before it dissolved in September 2022.

Council	Ward	Councillor	Former party	New party	Date
Hepburn	Creswick	Tim Drylie	Independent	Greens	Unknown date
Melbourne	Unsubdivided	Jason Chang	Team Arron Wood	Independent	2021
Banyule	Grimshaw	Rick Garotti	Labor	Independent	8 February 2021
Boroondara	Solway	Garry Thompson	Liberal	Independent	Mid-2021
Moreland	North-West	Oscar Yildiz	Independent	Victorians	26 November 2021
Moreland	North-West	Milad El-Halabi	Labor	Independent Labor	10 February 2022
Swan Hill	Central	Stuart King	Independent	United Australia	18 February 2022
Melbourne	Unsubdivided	Philip Le Liu	Bring Back Melbourne	Victorians	24 June 2022
Moreland	North-East	Helen Pavlidis-Mihalakos	Independent	Victorians	24 June 2022
Melbourne	Unsubdivided	Philip Le Liu	Victorians	Bring Back Melbourne	15 September 2022
Moreland	North-West	Oscar Yildiz	Victorians	Independent	15 September 2022
Moreland	North-East	Helen Pavlidis-Mihalakos	Victorians	Independent	15 September 2022
Yarra	Nicholls	Amanda Stone	Greens	Independent	6 February 2023
Merri-bek	South	James Conlan	Greens	Independent	7 February 2023
Stonnington	East	Joe Gianfriddo	Angry Victorians	Independent	29 June 2023
Colac Otway	Unsubdivided	Tosh-Jake Finnigan	Sack Dan Andrews	Independent	22 December 2023
Yarra	Langridge	Stephen Jolly	Independent Socialist	Yarra For All	February 2024
Yarra	Langridge	Michael Glynatsis	Independent	Yarra For All	February 2024
Yarra	Nicholls	Bridgid O'Brien	Independent Socialist	Yarra For All	February 2024
Yarra	Langridge	Anab Mohamud	Greens	Independent	27 February 2024
Monash	Mount Waverley	Anjalee de Silva	Greens	Independent	8 April 2024
Monash	Oakleigh	Josh Fergeus	Greens	Independent	8 April 2024
Greater Shepparton	Unsubdivided	Sam Spinks	Greens	Independent	11 July 2024
Moonee Valley	Myrnong	Rose Iser	Independent	Labor	2024
Darebin	North Central	Julie Williams	Labor	Independent	2024
Darebin	North East	Tim Laurence	Labor	Independent	2024

== Elections timeline ==
Voting takes place throughout October.

- 17 September – Candidate nominations close at 12pm
- 7−10 October – VEC to post ballot pack to voters
- 15 October – Expected receipt of ballot pack by all voters
- 25 October – Completed ballot papers must be sent to VEC before 6pm
- 26 October – Elections day, although no voting takes place on this date and counting will begin
- 15 November – Elections results announced by this date

== Campaign and controversies ==
In Manningham, Westerfolds Ward candidate Isabella Eltaha received criticism after handing out campaign flyers at Saint Haralambos Greek Orthodox Church "despite being explicitly asked not to campaign during a Sunday service". Eltaha told the Manningham Leader that she was "shocked" that anyone had an issue with her attendance and said she was "never told not to attend".

=== Israel–Gaza war ===
The Gaza war was the subject of campaigning in the local elections. As was the case at the New South Wales local elections in September, a group called "We Vote For Palestine" asked candidates to sign their pledge, which included supporting a ceasefire and divesting from Israel.

== Results ==
Map of results by ward

Party	Votes	%	Swing	Seats (Note: Excluding directly-elected mayors and deputy mayors.)	Change (Note: Compared to before the 2024 elections, not the result of the 2020 elections.)
Independents	2,093,674	60.29		457	
Ind. Labor	375,223	10.81		58	
Ind. Liberal	356,697	10.27		48	
Greens	201,189	5.79		28	Steady
Labor	121,013	3.45	+1.01	20	▲8
Victorian Socialists	67,296	1.94	+1.33	1	Steady
Community Independents (Whittlesea)	30,018	0.86	+0.86	2	▲2
Your Local Independents (Merri-bek)	21,940	0.63	+0.63	2	▼1
Team Nick Reece (Melbourne)	18,558	0.53	-0.21	2	(Note: Compared with Team Sally Capp at the 2020 election.)
Libertarian	18,449	0.53		2	Steady
Ind. National	16,439	0.47		5	▼1
Yarra For All (Yarra)	16,157	0.46	+0.46	4	▲1
Community Labor (Maribyrnong)	15,914	0.46	+0.46	3	▲3
Ind. Libertarian	13,133	0.38		2 (Note: Not including Joel Grist (Surf Coast) who is a member of the Libertarian Party (and thus an Independent Libertarian) but contested the election with the Back to Basics Team.)	▲2
Liberal	12,841	0.37	+0.37	1	▲1
Socialist Alliance	12,771	0.37	+0.09	1	Steady
Team Kouta (Melbourne)	10,588	0.30	+0.30	1 (Note: Including Gladys Liu (Melbourne), who is also a Liberal Party member (and thus an Independent Liberal).)	▲1
Team Wood (Melbourne)	9,366	0.27	-0.10	1	Steady
Residents of Port Phillip (Port Phillip)	7,279	0.21	-0.06	3	▲1
Ind. Freedom	6,452	0.19	+0.19	0	Steady
Animal Justice	5,618	0.16		0	▼1
People Empowering (Port Phillip)	5,465	0.16	+0.16	1	▲1
Back to Basics Team (Surf Coast)	4,183 (Note: Including Joel Grist, who was a member of the Libertarian Party (and thus an Independent Libertarian), but not including Paul Barker, who was endorsed by the Libertarian Party.)	0.12	+0.12	2	▲2
Team Morgan (Melbourne)	3,654	0.10	+0.05	1	▲1
Ind. Democratic Labour	3,441	0.10		0	Steady
Ind. United Australia	3,252	0.09	+0.09	1	Steady
Rip Up the Bike Lanes! (Melbourne)	2,878	0.08	+0.08	0	Steady
Team Hakim (Melbourne)	2,813	0.08	+0.07	0	▼1
Voices for Melbourne (Melbourne)	2,689	0.08	+0.08	0	Steady
Ind. Federation	2,189	0.06	+0.06	1	▲1
Ind. Sustainable Australia	2,013	0.06	+0.04	0	Steady
Ind. Family First	1,893	0.05	+0.05	0	Steady
Ind. Socialist Alliance	1,569	0.04		0	Steady
Innovate Melbourne (Melbourne)	1,547	0.04	+0.04	1	▲1
Your Voice Matters to Me (Melbourne)	1,134	0.03	+0.03	0	Steady
Team Elvis Martin (Melbourne)	1,000	0.03	+0.03	0	Steady
Ind. Legalise Cannabis	996	0.03	+0.03	0	Steady
Team Participate (Melbourne)	461	0.01	+0.01	0	Steady
Fusion	351	0.01	+0.01	0	Steady
Ind. Fusion	274	0.01	+0.01	0	Steady
Formal votes	3,472,417				
Informal votes					
Total				645	
Registered voters / turnout	4,532,506				

== Results analysis ==
=== Greens ===
The total statewide vote increased for the Greens, who won 28 councillors (a decrease of eight from 2020, but the same amount they held before the elections).

In Yarra, which elected a majority Greens council in 2020, the party went from five councillors to two, although the council-wide vote percentage remained almost unchanged. The party also lost all representation in Glen Eira, Port Phillip and Stonnington and lost one of its two seats in Melbourne.

Greens candidates were elected in Bass Coast, Campaspe and Frankston for the first time.

=== Victorian Socialists ===
In the almost 80 wards that the Victorian Socialists contested, the party had an average first preference vote of 10.8%.

Owen Cosgriff was elected to Whipstick Ward in Greater Bendigo, becoming the party's first candidate elected outside of Greater Melbourne and its first elected to a single-member district at any level of government. Cosgriff had 40.7% of first preferences and 52.7% of the two-candidate-preferred vote, defeating two independent candidates.

The party's vote increased in Darebin, where candidate Steph Price received 44.10% of the two-candidate-preferred vote in West Ward. In South West Ward, candidate Cat Rose came close to winning the seat after finishing in third place, just 0.42% behind the Greens (who went on to defeat Labor after preference distribution).

== By-elections and countbacks ==
The Victorian Electoral Commission has held a number of by-elections and countbacks to fill vacancies on councils since the 2024 elections.

=== By-elections ===
Council	Ward	Before		Change		After		
Council	Ward	Councillor	Party	Cause	Date	Date	Councillor	Party
Darebin	North West	Gaetano Greco	Independent	Death	26 April 2025	13 August 2025	Angela Villella	Independent
Whittlesea	Lalor	Stevan Kozmevski	Labor	Result at 2024 election voided	8 May 2025	13 August 2025	Michael Labrador	Independent
Wodonga	Lake Hume	Hannah Seymour	Independent	Resignation	30 June 2025	15 October 2025	Ron Mildren	Independent
Greater Bendigo	Lockwood	John McIlrath	Independent	Resignation	17 November 2025	8 April 2026	Donna Nicholas	Independent
Whittlesea	Thomastown	Nicholas Brooks	Community Independents	Resignation	11 January 2026	10 June 2026	Chaman Tiwari	Independent Labor
Latrobe	Morwell River	Tracie Lund	Independent	Resignation	16 March 2026	12 August 2026	Rob Moffatt	Independent
Kingston	Melaleuca	Tess Law	Independent	Resignation	31 March 2026	12 August 2026	Nikki Kaur	Independent
Wyndham	Heathdale	Jennie Barrera	Independent	Resignation	1 May 2026	12 August 2026	Kim McAliney	Independent Labor
Mornington Peninsula	Briars	Anthony Marsh	Independent Liberal	Elected to Victorian Parliament	14 May 2026	14 October 2026	Christine Leahy	Independent
Banyule	Beale	Elizabeth Nealy	Independent Labor	Resignation	3 July 2026	14 October 2026	Nicola Rooks	Independent
Greater Bendigo	Lockwood	Donna Nicholas	Independent	Death	7 July 2026	14 October 2026	David Thorpe	Independent
Murrindindi	Kinglake	Jodi Adams	Independent	Resignation	12 August 2026	28 October 2026	Jordyn Princi	Independent

=== Countbacks ===
Council	Ward	Before		Change		After		
Council	Ward	Councillor	Party	Cause	Date	Date	Councillor	Party
Golden Plains	Unsubdivided	Lachlan Glen	Independent	Resignation	10 December 2024	13 January 2025	Gavin Gamble	Greens
Golden Plains	Unsubdivided	Brett Cunningham	Independent	Resignation	6 May 2025	11 June 2025	Dom Cook	Independent
Macedon Ranges	South	Christine Walker	Independent	Death	1 August 2025	1 September 2025	Rob Guthrie	Independent
Surf Coast	Torquay	Rebecca Bourke	Back to Basics Team	Resignation	25 September 2025	5 November 2025	Phoebe Crockett	Greens
Benalla	Unsubdivided	Nathan Tolliday	Independent	Resignation	29 October 2025	3 December 2025	Vincent Michael Branigan	Independent
Southern Grampians	Unsubdivided	Albert Calvano	Independent	Resignation	9 April 2026	13 May 2026	Tamasyn Ramsay-Grounds	Animal Justice
Glenelg	Unsubdivided	Mike Noske	Independent	Resignation	28 April 2026	3 June 2026	Mary Picard	Independent

== See also ==
- 2024 Melbourne City Council election
