= Undivided council =

Australian local government term for a council that does not have any wards

In Australian local government, an undivided council (also referred to as unsubdivided, a single ward or an at-large ward) is a council that does not have any wards, meaning all councillors are elected in a single area representing the entire local government area (LGA).

== History ==
=== Queensland ===
Following a series of amalgamations in 2008, a number of newly created councils moved to undivided structures, even if the pre-amalgamated councils used wards.

Some of these changes only lasted until the 2012 local elections. In Longreach, wards were initially used but replaced in 2012, and in Townsville, the undivided structure was replaced in 2012.

As of 2024, 54 of Queensland's 77 LGAs are undivided.

=== Victoria ===
As a result of the Local Government Act 2020, all rural-based councils in Victoria now have the option to become undivided or have equal-sized multi-member wards. From the 2024 local elections onwards, the City of Melbourne will be the only metropolitan local government area in Victoria using an undivided structure.

== Electoral systems ==
In New South Wales and Victoria, undivided councils use forms of proportional representation. In Queensland, plurality block voting (also referred to as first-past-the-post by the Electoral Commission) is used.

== See also ==
- At-large
