= Local Government Act 2020 =

Act of the Parliament of Victoria, Australia

Parliament of Victoria
- Long title: An Act to reform the law relating to local government in Victoria, to repeal the City of Greater Geelong Act 1993, to amend the City of Melbourne Act 2001, the Local Government Act 1989, the Victoria Grants Commission Act 1976 and the Victorian Independent Remuneration Tribunal and Improving Parliamentary Standards Act 2019, and to consequentially amend certain other Acts and for other purposes
- Citation: No. 9 of 2020
- Territorial extent: Victoria
- Passed by: Legislative Assembly
- Passed: 17 March 2020
- Passed by: Legislative Council
- Passed: 5 March 2020
- Royal assent: 24 March 2020
- Commenced: 6 April 2020
- Effective: Various

Legislative history

Initiating chamber: Legislative Assembly
- Bill title: Local Government Bill 2019
- Introduced by: Marlene Kairouz
- Introduced: 13 November 2019
- First reading: 13 November 2019
- Second reading: 14–28 November 2019
- Consideration in detail: 28 November 2019
- Third reading: 28 November 2019

Revising chamber: Legislative Council
- Bill title: Local Government Bill 2019
- Received from the Legislative Assembly: 28 November 2019
- Member(s) in charge: Adem Somyurek
- First reading: 28 November 2019
- Second reading: 28 November 2019 – 3 March 2020
- Committee of the whole: 3–5 March 2020
- Third reading: 5 March 2020

Final stages
- Legislative Council amendments considered by the Legislative Assembly: 17 March 2020
- Finally passed both chambers: 17 March 2020

Amends
- No. 5 of 2001, No. 11 of 1989, No. 8887 of 1976, No. 68 of 2000, No. 5 of 2019, No. 62 of 2001, No. 115 of 1994, etc.

Repeals
- No. 16 of 1993, No. 65 of 2009, No. 14 of 2016, No. 53 of 2013
- Status: In force (amended)

The Local Government Act 2020 (No. 9 of 2020) was a significant statute in Victoria, Australia, notable for its impact on the electoral systems of local councils in Victoria. The act, which the Victorian Government described as the "most ambitious and comprehensive reform of local government in Victoria for 30 years," saw a large number of multi-member wards replaced with single-member wards.

Reviews were undertaken for the number of councillors, number of councillors per ward and the exact boundaries of those wards for 39 of Victoria's 79 councils.

The act was introduced on 17 June 2019 by the then-Minister for Local Government, Adem Somyurek. It passed parliament on 17 March 2020, and received royal assent days later on 24 March.

The act has been criticised for its removal of proportional representation for most councils, and the consequential likely negative impact on the ability for women and minority groups to be elected.

== Councils affected ==
All metropolitan councils with multi-member wards were affected by the changes. Rural councils have the options of being unsubdivided, or having equal-sized multi-member wards. The City of Melbourne, which is unsubdivided and does not have wards, was not impacted.

Although most changes were set to come into effect before the 2024 local elections, eight councils moved to single-member wards ahead of the 2020 local elections:

- Bayside City Council
- Cardinia Shire Council
- Darebin City Council
- Greater Dandenong City Council
- Kingston City Council
- Manningham City Council
- Maroondah City Council
- Whitehorse City Council

Additionally, Swan Hill and Mansfield moved to an unsubdivided structure.
