= Results of the 2024 Victorian local elections in Northern Melbourne =

2024 Victorian local elections (Northern Melbourne)
- 26 October 2024

This is a list of results for the 2024 Victorian local elections in the Northern Melbourne region.

Northern Melbourne covers the local government areas (LGAs) of Banyule, Darebin, Hume, Merri-bek, Nillumbik and Whittlesea.

== Banyule ==
2024 Banyule City Council election
- 26 October 2024

All 9 seats on Banyule City Council 5 seats needed for a majority
- Registered: 92,196
- Turnout: 83.02% (▼1.69 pp)
	First party	Second party	Third party
	IND		IND
Party	Independent	Greens	Ind. Labor
Last election	5 seats	2 seats	2 seats
Seats before	6	2	1
Seats won	6	2	1
Seat change	Steady	Steady	Steady
First preference vote	43,924	14,446	2,632
Percentage	66.58%	21.90%	3.99%
Swing	▼5.83	▲9.24	▼5.57
Largest party before election
Independents
Subsequent largest party
Independents

Banyule City Council is composed of nine single-member wards.

Independent Labor councillor Elizabeth Nealy was uncontested in Beale Ward and was formally declared elected after voting closed.

=== Banyule results ===
2024 Victorian local elections: Banyule
Party	Votes	%	Swing	Seats	Change
Independent	43,924	66.58	−5.83	6	Steady
Greens	14,446	21.90	+9.24	2	Steady
Independent Labor	2,632	3.99	-5.57	1	Steady
Victorian Socialists	2,506	3.80	+3.80	0	Steady
Independent Liberal	2,461	3.73	−0.76	0	Steady
Formal votes	65,969	97.06	-0.37		
Informal votes	1,995	2.94	+0.37		
Total	67,964			9	

=== Bakewell ===
2024 Victorian local elections: Bakewell Ward
Party	Candidate	Votes	%	±%
Independent	Mark Di Pasquale	3,133	37.31	+2.76
Independent	Nicola Rooks	1,797	21.40	+21.40
Independent	Callum Shaw	1,475	17.57	+17.57
Independent Labor	Stephen Hird	974	11.60	+11.60
Greens	David Scott	588	7.00	+7.00
Victorian Socialists	William Roumeliotis	430	5.12	+5.12
Total formal votes		8,397	96.57	−0.92
Informal votes		298	3.43	+0.92
Turnout		8,695	83.18	−0.20
Two-candidate-preferred result
Independent	Mark Di Pasquale	4,627	55.10	+3.51
Independent	Nicola Rooks	3,770	44.90	+44.90
Independent hold		Swing	+3.51	

=== Beale ===
2024 Victorian local elections: Beale Ward
Party	Candidate	Votes	%	±%
Independent Labor	Elizabeth Nealy	unopposed		
Registered electors		10,334		
Independent Labor hold		Swing	N/A	

==== 2026 Beale Ward by-election ====
2026 Beale Ward by-election (14 September – 2 October 2026)
Party	Candidate	Votes	%	±%
Independent	Nicola Rooks	1,700	21.85	
Independent Liberal	Kevan Hill	1,653	21.25	
Independent	Kate Landers	1,330	17.10	
Independent Liberal	Lauren Sandars	1,106	14.22	
Greens	Logan Farrell	778	10.00	
Independent	Renato Barra	720	9.26	
Victorian Socialists	Fleur Taylor	492	6.32	
Total formal votes		7,779	96.85	N/A
Informal votes		253	3.15	N/A
Turnout		8,032	76.61	N/A
Two-candidate-preferred result
Independent	Nicola Rooks	4,486	57.67	
Independent Liberal	Kevan Hill	3,293	42.33	
Independent hold		Swing	N/A	

- By-election held after the resignation of sitting councillor Elizabeth Nealy.
- Wayne Phillips was subsequently retired as a candidate under regulation 27 of the Local Government (Electoral) Regulations 2020, with the VEC not publicly specifying the particular eligibility ground.

=== Chelsworth ===
2024 Victorian local elections: Chelsworth Ward
Party	Candidate	Votes	%	±%
Greens	Alida McKern	4,809	60.88	+40.70
Independent	Kristina Murray	1,928	24.41	+24.41
Independent	Houwaida Ayoub	1,162	14.71	+11.13
Total formal votes		7,899	97.23	+0.85
Informal votes		225	2.77	−0.85
Turnout		8,124	83.43	−2.40
Greens hold		Swing	+9.66	

=== Griffin ===
2024 Victorian local elections: Griffin Ward
Party	Candidate	Votes	%	±%
Greens	Peter Castaldo	4,389	53.68	+15.84
Independent	Keith McLachlan	2,923	35.75	+35.75
Independent	David Griffiths	864	10.57	+10.57
Total formal votes		8,176	97.46	−0.74
Informal votes		213	2.54	+0.74
Turnout		8,389	82.71	−2.29
Greens hold		Swing	−2.75	

- Matt Perkins nominated to contest the election, but was found to be ineligible after not completing mandatory candidate training. He was "retired" as a candidate on 20 September 2024 and did not appear on the ballot paper.

=== Grimshaw ===
2024 Victorian local elections: Grimshaw Ward
Party	Candidate	Votes	%	±%
Independent	Rick Garotti	6,796	79.68	+25.56
Greens	Sam Boatwright	940	11.02	+11.02
Victorian Socialists	Rory Gee	793	9.30	+9.30
Total formal votes		8,529	96.73	−0.90
Informal votes		288	3.27	+0.90
Turnout		8,817	85.59	−0.65
Independent hold		Swing	+25.56	

=== Hawdon ===
2024 Victorian local elections: Hawdon Ward
Party	Candidate	Votes	%	±%
Independent	Matt Wood	3,695	41.60	+41.60
Independent	Will Cardamone	2,230	25.11	+25.11
Independent	Raj Bhatia	1,642	18.49	+18.49
Independent	Chris Kearney	1,314	14.80	+14.80
Total formal votes		8,881	97.57	+0.08
Informal votes		221	2.43	−0.08
Turnout		9,102	85.14	−2.31
Two-candidate-preferred result
Independent	Matt Wood	5,186	58.39	+58.39
Independent	Will Cardamone	3,695	41.61	+41.61
Independent hold		Swing	N/A	

=== Ibbott ===
2024 Victorian local elections: Ibbott Ward
Party	Candidate	Votes	%	±%
Independent	Alicia Curry	2,913	36.49	+36.49
Greens	Nina Crawley	1,944	24.35	−3.32
Independent	Melissa Murphy-Webster	1,660	20.80	+20.80
Independent	Paul Brown	924	11.58	+11.58
Victorian Socialists	Marty Hirst	541	6.78	+6.78
Total formal votes		7,982	97.50	+0.32
Informal votes		205	2.50	−0.32
Turnout		8,187	84.86	−0.36
Two-candidate-preferred result
Independent	Alicia Curry	5,155	64.58	+64.58
Greens	Nina Crawley	2,827	35.42	+7.75
Independent hold		Swing	N/A	

=== Olympia ===
2024 Victorian local elections: Olympia Ward
Party	Candidate	Votes	%	±%
Independent	Mary O'Kane	2,338	30.12	+30.12
Independent	Craig Langdon	1,387	17.87	−11.10
Greens	Paul Morland	1,001	12.90	+12.90
Independent	Alex Childs	796	10.26	+10.26
Victorian Socialists	Lucas Moore	742	9.56	+9.56
Independent	Amina Liban	508	6.55	+6.55
Independent	Abdirizak Mohamed	502	6.47	+6.47
Independent	Wendy Palliser	487	6.27	+6.27
Total formal votes		7,761	96.33	−0.96
Informal votes		296	3.67	+0.96
Turnout		8,057	75.38	−0.39
Two-candidate-preferred result
Independent	Mary O'Kane	5,061	65.21	+65.21
Independent	Craig Langdon	2,700	34.79	−6.29
Independent hold		Swing	N/A	

=== Sherbourne ===
2024 Victorian local elections: Sherbourne Ward
Party	Candidate	Votes	%	±%
Independent	Alison Champion	2,580	30.92	−9.55
Independent Liberal	Lauren Sandars	2,461	29.49	+29.49
Independent Labor	Ian Robertson	1,658	19.87	+19.87
Independent	Michelle Giovas	870	10.43	−8.45
Greens	Greta Gillies	775	9.29	+9.29
Total formal votes		8,344	97.10	−0.25
Informal votes		249	2.90	+0.25
Turnout		8,593	84.25	−1.23
Two-candidate-preferred result
Independent	Alison Champion	4,334	51.94	−8.08
Independent Liberal	Lauren Sandars	4,010	48.06	+48.06
Independent hold		Swing	−8.08	

== Darebin ==
2024 Darebin City Council election
- 26 October 2024

All 9 seats on Darebin City Council 5 seats needed for a majority
- Registered: 108,217
- Turnout: 79.76%

	First party	Second party	Third party
	IND
Party	Independents	Labor	Greens
Last election	3 seats	3 seats	3 seats
Seats before	5	1	3
Seats won	1	5	3
Seat change	▼2	▲2	Steady
Primary vote	28,746	25,905	19,418
Percentage	34.54%	31.13%	23.33%
Swing	▲5.49	▲8.89 (Note: Compared to the Labor Members for Darebin result at the 2020 election.)	▼1.24
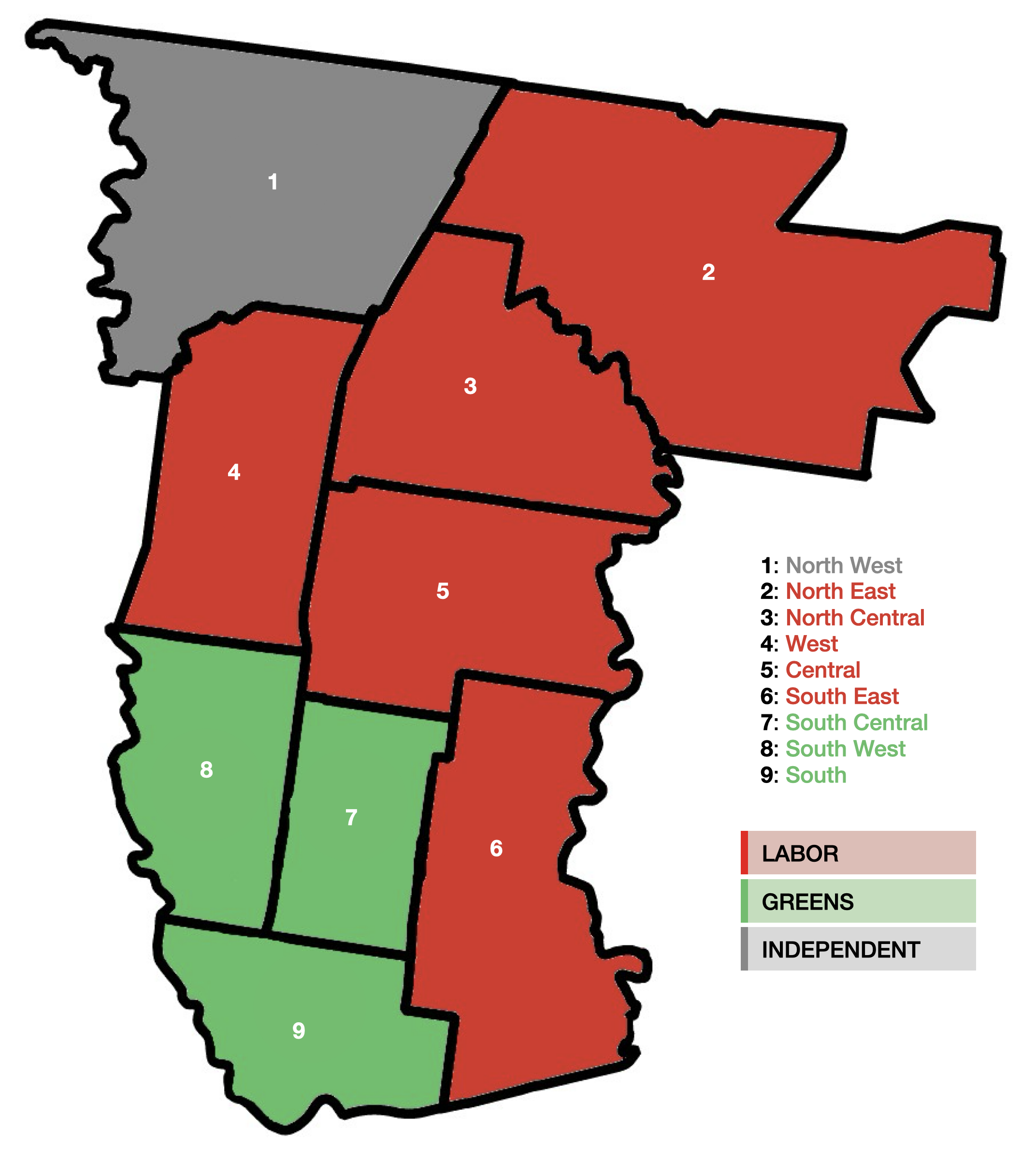
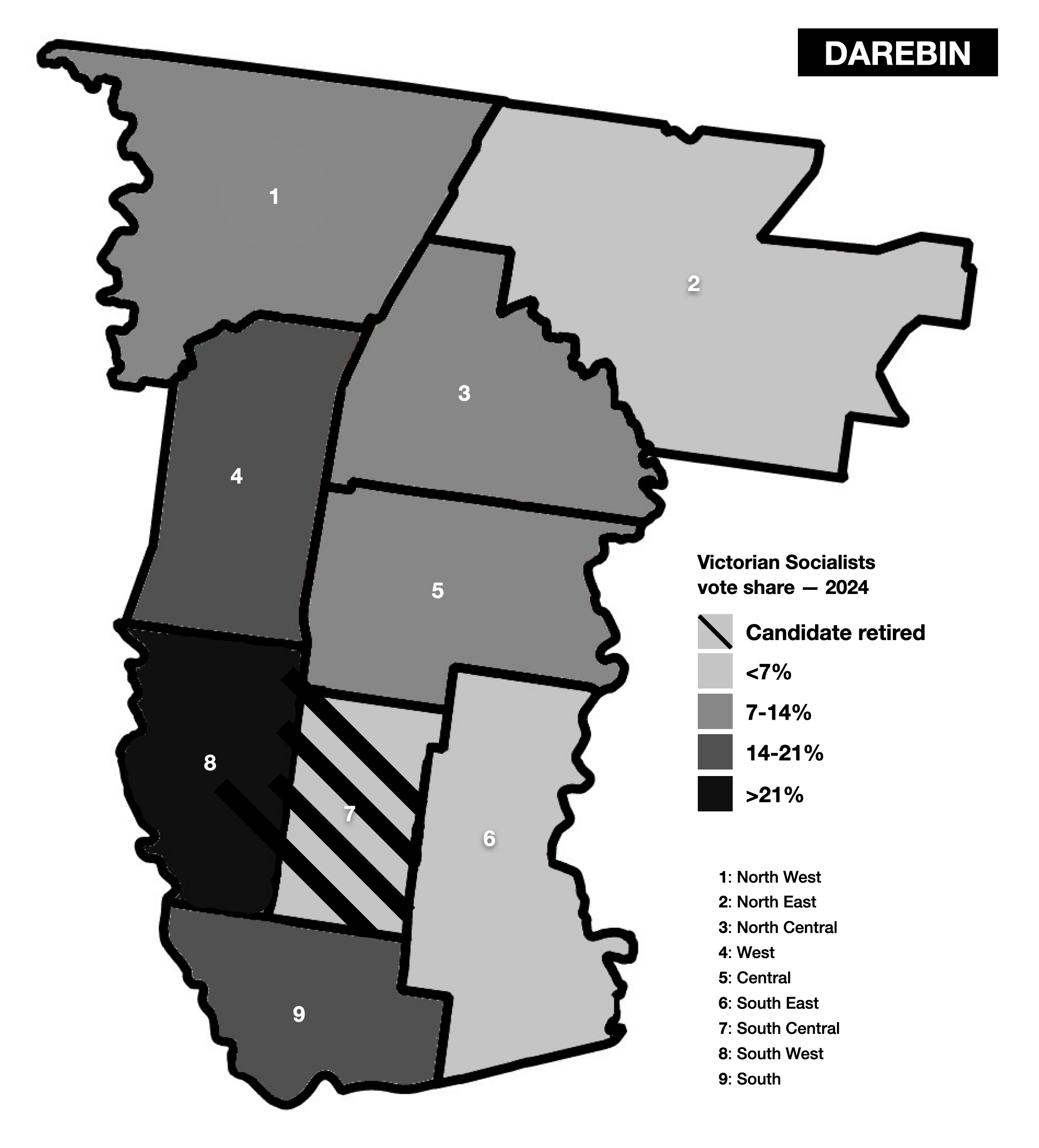
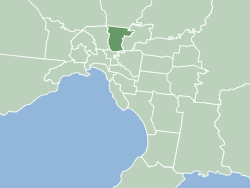
Largest party before election
Independents
Subsequent largest party
Labor

Darebin City Council is composed of nine single-member wards. Darebin's ward structure was changed prior to the 2020 election, making this the second election with single-member wards.

Councillors Tim Laurence and Julie Williams, who were both elected as part of "Labor Members for Darebin" in 2020, did not contest the election as endorsed Labor Party candidates.

Independent councillor Susan Rennie did not recontest South Central Ward, where she endorsed Greens candidate Ruth Jelley, and instead unsuccessfully contested South East Ward. Additionally, Greens councillors Tom Hannan (South Ward) and Trent McCarthy (South West Ward) did not seek re-election.

Labor won a majority with five seats, while the Greens retained three seats, although mayor Susanne Newton lost her seat of West Ward.

=== Darebin results ===
2024 Victorian local elections: Darebin
Party	Votes	%	Swing	Seats	Change
Independent	28,746	34.54	+5.49	1	▼2
Labor	25,905	31.13	+8.89	5	▲2
Greens	19,418	23.33	−1.24	3	Steady
Victorian Socialists	9,634	11.58	+4.02	0	Steady
Total	83,219	100.00		9	Steady
Informal votes	3,093	3.58			
Turnout	86,312	79.76			
Enrolled voters	108,217				

=== Central ===
2024 Victorian local elections: Central Ward
Party	Candidate	Votes	%	±%
Labor	Kristine Olaris	2,433	27.87	+14.37
Independent	Zheng Chin	1,588	18.19	+18.19
Greens	Courtney May	1,519	17.40	−8.43
Independent	Lina Messina	1,276	14.61	−10.66
Victorian Socialists	Cameron Rowe	753	8.62	−0.11
Independent	Craig Walters	534	6.12	+6.12
Independent	Alexander Taylor	486	5.57	+5.57
Independent	Rob Beck	142	1.63	+1.63
Total formal votes		8,731	96.03	−0.55
Informal votes		361	3.97	+0.55
Turnout		9,092	78.14	−0.58
Two-candidate-preferred result
Labor	Kristine Olaris	4,627	53.00	+53.00
Independent	Zheng Chin	4,104	47.00	+47.00
Labor gain from Independent		Swing	N/A	

=== North Central ===
2024 Victorian local elections: North Central Ward
Party	Candidate	Votes	%	±%
Labor	Vasilios Tsalkos	2,333	26.04	−6.82
Independent	Julie Williams	1,834	20.47	+20.47 (Note: If compared to her results as a Labor Members for Darebin candidate at the 2020 election, Julie Williams had a 12.39% first preference vote swing against her and a 13.08% two-candidate-preferred vote swing against her.)
Independent	Carmel Italiano	1,438	16.05	+16.05
Greens	Mohammad Helmy	1,281	14.30	−4.75
Independent	Carmen Lahiff-Jenkins	1,044	11.65	+11.65
Victorian Socialists	Jess Lenehan	683	7.62	−0.35
Independent	Hamish Kemp	345	3.85	+3.85
Total formal votes		8,958	96.32	−0.24
Informal votes		342	3.68	+0.24
Turnout		9,300	78.38	+0.03
Two-candidate-preferred result
Labor	Vasilios Tsalkos	4,877	54.44	−4.20
Independent	Julie Williams	4,081	45.56	+45.56
Labor hold		Swing	N/A	

=== North East ===
2024 Victorian local elections: North East Ward
Party	Candidate	Votes	%	±%
Independent	Tim Laurence	2,307	24.49	+24.49 (Note: If compared to his results as a Labor Members for Darebin candidate at the 2020 election, Tim Laurence had a 10.29% first preference vote swing against him and a 7.29% two-candidate-preferred vote swing against him.)
Labor	Matt Arturi	2,286	24.27	−10.51
Independent	Craig Smith	1,728	18.35	+18.35
Greens	Nina Laitala	1,441	15.30	+8.61
Independent	Kim Ly Nguyen	1,085	11.52	+11.52
Victorian Socialists	Nathan Mackie	572	6.07	−2.67
Total formal votes		9,419	96.76	+0.37
Informal votes		315	3.24	−0.37
Turnout		9,734	81.43	−0.23
Two-candidate-preferred result
Labor	Matt Arturi	4,758	50.51	−6.27
Independent	Tim Laurence	4,661	49.49	+49.49
Labor hold		Swing	N/A	

=== North West ===
2024 Victorian local elections: North West Ward
Party	Candidate	Votes	%	±%
Independent	Gaetano Greco	5,616	57.84	+18.00
Labor	Geraldine Wood	1,951	20.09	+1.40 (Note: Compared to the results of Sofia Kotanidis at the 2020 election, who ran as an Independent Labor candidate after being disendorsed by Labor Members for Darebin.)
Greens	Patchouli Paterson	1,192	12.28	+5.14
Victorian Socialists	Adam Slater	950	9.78	+4.12
Total formal votes		9,709	96.90	+0.56
Informal votes		311	3.10	−0.56
Turnout		10,020	81.57	−0.78
Independent hold		Swing	+18.00	

==== 2025 North West Ward by-election ====
2025 North West Ward by-election (14 July–1 August 2025)
Party	Candidate	Votes	%	±%
Independent	Angela Villella	2,495	27.43	+27.43
Labor	Daniel Scoullar	1,601	17.60	−2.49
Victorian Socialists	Cat Rose	1,316	14.47	+4.68
Independent	Leon Zembekis	1,137	12.50	+12.50
Independent	Tim Laurence	1,126	12.38	+12.38
Greens	Melanie Thewlis	733	8.06	−4.22
Independent	George Kanjere	687	7.55	+7.55
Total formal votes		9,095	96.92	+0.02
Informal votes		289	3.08	−0.02
Turnout		9,384	76.22	−5.35
Two-candidate-preferred result
Independent	Angela Villella	5,240	57.61	+57.61
Victorian Socialists	Cat Rose	3,855	42.39	+42.39
Independent gain from Independent		Swing	+57.61	

- By-election held after the death of sitting councillor Gaetano Greco.

=== South ===
2024 Victorian local elections: South Ward
Party	Candidate	Votes	%	±%
Labor	Melentie Pandiolvski	4,281	45.09	+17.60
Greens	Julie O'Brien	3,788	39.90	+2.17
Victorian Socialists	Edward Plowman	1,425	15.01	+10.52
Total formal votes		9,494	96.71	−1.41
Informal votes		323	3.29	+1.41
Turnout		9,817	79.55	−1.79
Two-candidate-preferred result
Greens	Julie O'Brien	4,781	50.36	−4.27
Labor	Melentie Pandiolvski	4,713	49.64	+4.27
Greens hold		Swing	−4.27	

=== South Central ===
2024 Victorian local elections: South Central Ward
Party	Candidate	Votes	%	±%
Greens	Ruth Jelley	3,500	39.11	+19.24
Independent	Carmel Davies	2,966	33.15	+33.15
Labor	Liz Landray	2,482	27.74	+12.72
Victorian Socialists	Simone White (ineligible) (Note: Candidate was ineligible to contest the election after not completing mandatory candidate training. They still appeared on the ballot as they were only "retired" by the Victorian Electoral Commission after ballot papers had been printed, however they could not serve as a councillor and their votes were distributed to other candidates according to voters' preferences.)	N/A	N/A	−7.72
Total formal votes		8,948	97.16	+0.16
Informal votes		262	2.84	−0.16
Turnout		9,210	77.52	−1.33
Two-candidate-preferred result
Greens	Ruth Jelley	4,678	52.28	+13.22
Independent	Carmel Davies	4,270	47.72	+47.72
Greens gain from Independent		Swing	N/A	

=== South East ===
2024 Victorian local elections: South East Ward
Party	Candidate	Votes	%	±%
Labor	Emily Dimitriadis	4,092	42.82	−1.09
Greens	Melanie Thewlis	1,542	16.14	−8.93
Independent	Mark Johnston	1,188	12.43	+12.43
Independent	Susan Rennie	998	10.44	+10.44
Independent	Carorlyn Lunt	515	5.39	+5.39
Victorian Socialists	James Atyeo	622	6.51	−0.16
Independent	Elias Tsigaras	486	5.09	+5.09
Independent	Mary Greene	113	1.18	+1.18
Total formal votes		9,556	96.44	−0.85
Informal votes		353	3.56	+0.85
Turnout		9,909	80.60	−1.53
After distribution of preferences
Labor	Emily Dimitriadis	5,086	53.22	−5.49
Greens	Melanie Thewlis	2,792	29.22	−12.07
Independent	Mark Johnston	1,678	17.56	+17.56
Labor hold		Swing	−5.49	

=== South West ===
2024 Victorian local elections: South West Ward
Party	Candidate	Votes	%	±%
Labor	Kate Polglaze	2,937	34.72	+12.69
Greens	Alexandra Sangster	2,779	32.85	−11.06
Victorian Socialists	Cat Rose	2,743	32.43	+24.71
Total formal votes		8,459	95.24	−2.13
Informal votes		423	4.76	+2.13
Turnout		8,882	79.91	−2.38
Two-candidate-preferred result
Greens	Alexandra Sangster	4,497	53.16	+2.91
Labor	Kate Polglaze	3,962	46.84	+20.78
Greens hold		Swing	+2.91	

=== West ===
2024 Victorian local elections: West Ward
Party	Candidate	Votes	%	±%
Labor	Connie Boglis	2,626	26.41	+16.21
Greens	Susanne Newton	2,376	23.89	−16.78
Victorian Socialists	Steph Price	1,886	18.96	+6.32
Independent	Alex Bhathal	1,372	13.80	+13.80
Independent	Leon Zembekis	1,288	12.95	+12.95
Independent	Brian Sanaghan	397	3.99	+3.99
Total formal votes		9,945	96.11	−1.11
Informal votes		403	3.89	+1.11
Turnout		10,348	80.55	−1.11
Two-candidate-preferred result
Labor	Connie Boglis	5,550	55.90	+55.90
Victorian Socialists	Steph Price	4,386	44.10	+44.10
Labor gain from Greens		Swing	N/A	

== Hume ==
2024 Hume City Council election
- 26 October 2024

All 11 seats on Hume City Council 6 seats needed for a majority
Largest party before election
No overall control
Subsequent largest party
Independent Labor

Hume City Council is composed of 11 single-member wards. Prior to the 2024 election, it was composed of three multi-member wards (two four-member, one three-member), but the electoral structure has changed as a result of the Local Government Act 2020.

=== Hume results ===
2024 Victorian local elections: Hume
Party	Votes	%	Swing	Seats	Change
Independents	60,259	47.87		3	▼2
Independent Labor	57,162	45.41		7	▲2
Independent Liberal	5,297	4.21		1	Steady
Victorian Socialists	1,660	1.32		0	Steady
Greens	1,502	1.19		0	Steady
Formal votes	125,880	96.23			
Informal votes	4,928	3.77			
Total	130,808	100.00		11	Steady
Registered voters / turnout	162,752	80.37			

=== Aitken ===
2024 Victorian local elections: Aitken Ward
Party	Candidate	Votes	%	±%
Independent Labor	Carly Moore	9,069	82.86	
Independent	Harsimran Kaur	1,010	9.23	
Independent	Gurpreet Singh	866	7.91	
Total formal votes		10,945	96.37	
Informal votes		412	3.63	
Turnout		11,357	80.56	
After distribution of preferences
Independent Labor win		(new ward)		

=== Bababi Marning ===
2024 Victorian local elections: Bababi Marning Ward
Party	Candidate	Votes	%	±%
Independent Labor	John Haddad	2,584	23.52	
Independent Labor	Asif Naeem	2,314	21.07	
Independent	Graeme David Marr	1,754	15.97	
Independent	Ozcan Oztas	1,666	15.17	
Independent	Sema N. Bolat	1,488	13.55	
Independent Labor	Burhan Yigit	1,179	10.73	
Independent	Mohamad Abbouche (ineligible)	0	0.00	
Total formal votes		10,985	95.36	
Informal votes		534	4.64	
Turnout		11,519	75.28	
Two-candidate-preferred result
Independent Labor	John Haddad	5,682	51.73	
Independent Labor	Asif Naeem	5,303	48.27	
Independent Labor win		(new ward)		

=== Burt-kur-min ===
2024 Victorian local elections: Burt-kur-min Ward
Party	Candidate	Votes	%	±%
Independent Liberal	Jim Overend	4,112	36.03	
Independent Labor	Jo Hardie	2,624	22.99	
Independent	Hussam Mestou	1,173	10.28	
Independent Labor	Manisha Garg	1,065	9.33	
Independent	Sabahat Farooq	923	8.09	
Independent	Manoj Kumar	660	5.78	
Independent	Sarwan Singh Sandhu	497	4.35	
Independent	Gurpreet Singh Mann	231	2.02	
Independent Liberal	Avonjot Singh	128	1.12	
Total formal votes		11,413	95.61	
Informal votes		524	4.39	
Turnout		11,937	81.69	
Two-candidate-preferred result
Independent Liberal	Jim Overend	6,210	54.41	
Independent Labor	Jo Hardie	5,203	45.59	
Independent Liberal win		(new ward)		

=== Emu Creek ===
2024 Victorian local elections: Emu Creek Ward
Party	Candidate	Votes	%	±%
Independent	Jack Medcraft	4,953	39.82	
Independent	Kate Hamley	4,568	36.73	
Independent	Trevor Dance	2,917	23.45	
Total formal votes		12,438	97.45	
Informal votes		326	2.55	
Turnout		12,764	84.06	
Two-candidate-preferred result
Independent	Kate Hamley	6,632	53.32	
Independent	Jack Medcraft	5,806	46.68	
Independent win		(new ward)		

=== Jacksons Hill ===
2024 Victorian local elections: Jacksons Hill Ward
Party	Candidate	Votes	%	±%
Independent Labor	Jarrod Bell	5,362	43.19	
Independent	Natalie Harrison	4,856	39.12	
Independent	John Karagiannidis	2,196	17.69	
Total formal votes		12,414	97.22	
Informal votes		355	2.78	
Turnout		12,769	82.25	
Two-candidate-preferred result
Independent Labor	Jarrod Bell	6,211	50.03	
Independent	Natalie Harrison	6,203	49.97	
Independent Labor win		(new ward)		

=== Merlynston Creek ===
2024 Victorian local elections: Merlynston Creek Ward
Party	Candidate	Votes	%	±%
Independent Labor	Karen Sherry	3,657	33.29	
Independent	Bassima Hawli	1,933	17.60	
Independent	Ibrahim Gocol	952	8.67	
Greens	Shahnoor Shah	920	8.37	
Victorian Socialists	Mutullah Can Yolbulan	855	7.78	
Independent	Micaela Griffiths	825	7.51	
Independent	Joe Aguilus	707	6.44	
Independent Labor	Sheena Haweil	657	5.98	
Independent	Yesim Kuluk	480	4.37	
Total formal votes		10,986	94.88	
Informal votes		593	5.12	
Turnout		11,579	73.31	
Two-candidate-preferred result
Independent Labor	Karen Sherry	6,184	56.29	
Independent	Bassima Hawli	4,802	43.71	
Independent Labor win		(new ward)		

=== Mount Ridley ===
2024 Victorian local elections: Mount Ridley Ward
Party	Candidate	Votes	%	±%
Independent Labor	Daniel English	6,380	55.91	
Independent Labor	Raj Mann	1,623	14.22	
Independent	Marcus Harrington	1,405	12.31	
Independent	Amarjeet Singh Bhullar	595	5.21	
Independent Labor	Ananta Raj Poudel	595	5.21	
Independent	Ricky Rataul Singh	487	4.27	
Independent	Venkata Ambati	326	2.86	
Total formal votes		11,411	96.25	
Informal votes		444	3.75	
Turnout		11,855	81.43	
After distribution of preferences
Independent Labor win		(new ward)		

- Anand Sharma nominated to contest the election, but was found to be ineligible after not completing mandatory candidate training. He was "retired" as a candidate on 20 September 2024 and did not appear on the ballot paper.

=== Roxburgh Park ===
2024 Victorian local elections: Roxburgh Park Ward
Party	Candidate	Votes	%	±%
Independent	Sam Misho	2,703	23.92	
Independent Labor	Drew Jessop	1,314	11.63	
Independent	Aleyna Mimi	1,251	11.07	
Independent	Yasir Mahmud	1,165	10.31	
Independent	Roshan Silva	924	8.18	
Independent Labor	Sahar Ageed	917	8.12	
Victorian Socialists	David Williams	805	7.12	
Independent Labor	Phillip Di Biase	769	6.81	
Independent Labor	Sargon Thomas	632	5.59	
Greens	Muhammad Nisar Ul Murtaza	582	5.15	
Independent Liberal	Muhtadi Albandar	238	2.11	
Total formal votes		11,300	94.85	
Informal votes		613	5.15	
Turnout		11,913	80.09	
Two-candidate-preferred result
Independent	Sam Misho	6,211	54.96	
Independent	Aleyna Mimi	5,089	45.04	
Independent win		(new ward)		

=== Tullamarine ===
2024 Victorian local elections: Tullamarine Ward
Party	Candidate	Votes	%	±%
Independent Labor	Naim Kurt	6,911	56.49	
Independent	Jodi Jackson	2,863	23.40	
Independent	Linda Hanna	2,461	20.11	
Total formal votes		12,235	97.60	
Informal votes		301	2.40	
Turnout		12,536	82.39	
After distribution of preferences
Independent Labor win		(new ward)		

=== Woodlands ===
2024 Victorian local elections: Woodlands Ward
Party	Candidate	Votes	%	±%
Independent Labor	Steve Gagen	3,792	33.26	
Independent Labor	Joseph Haweil	3,533	30.99	
Independent Labor	Adem Atmaca	2,185	19.16	
Independent Liberal	Lalith Udugampala	824	7.23	
Independent	Khalid Hussain	765	6.71	
Independent Liberal	Assaad Eddie Issa	303	2.66	
Total formal votes		11,402	96.74	
Informal votes		384	3.26	
Turnout		11,786	83.16	
Two-candidate-preferred result
Independent Labor	Steve Gagen	5,982	52.46	
Independent Labor	Joseph Haweil	5,420	47.54	
Independent Labor win		(new ward)		

=== Yubup ===
2024 Victorian local elections: Yubup Ward
Party	Candidate	Votes	%	±%
Independent	Ally Watson	5,490	53.04	
Independent	Emily Greco	1,250	12.08	
Independent	Muhammad Shahzad	1,027	9.92	
Independent	Guri Singh	1,026	9.91	
Independent	Ravneet Singh Sohi	783	7.56	
Independent	Sahib Singh	453	4.38	
Independent Liberal	Vikein Mouradian	322	3.11	
Total formal votes		10,351	95.90	
Informal votes		442	4.10	
Turnout		10,793	80.45	
After distribution of preferences
Independent win		(new ward)		

== Merri-bek ==
2024 Merri-bek City Council election
- 26 October 2024

All 11 seats on Merri-bek City Council 6 seats needed for a majority
- Registered: 123,327
- Turnout: 78.81%

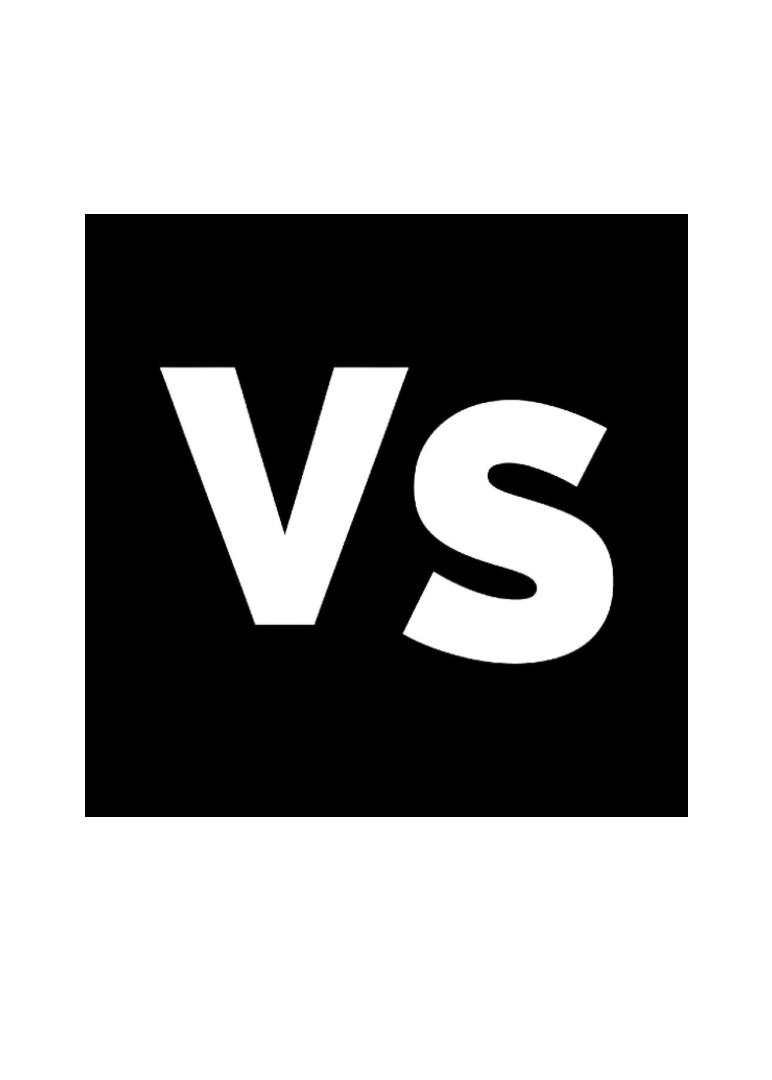

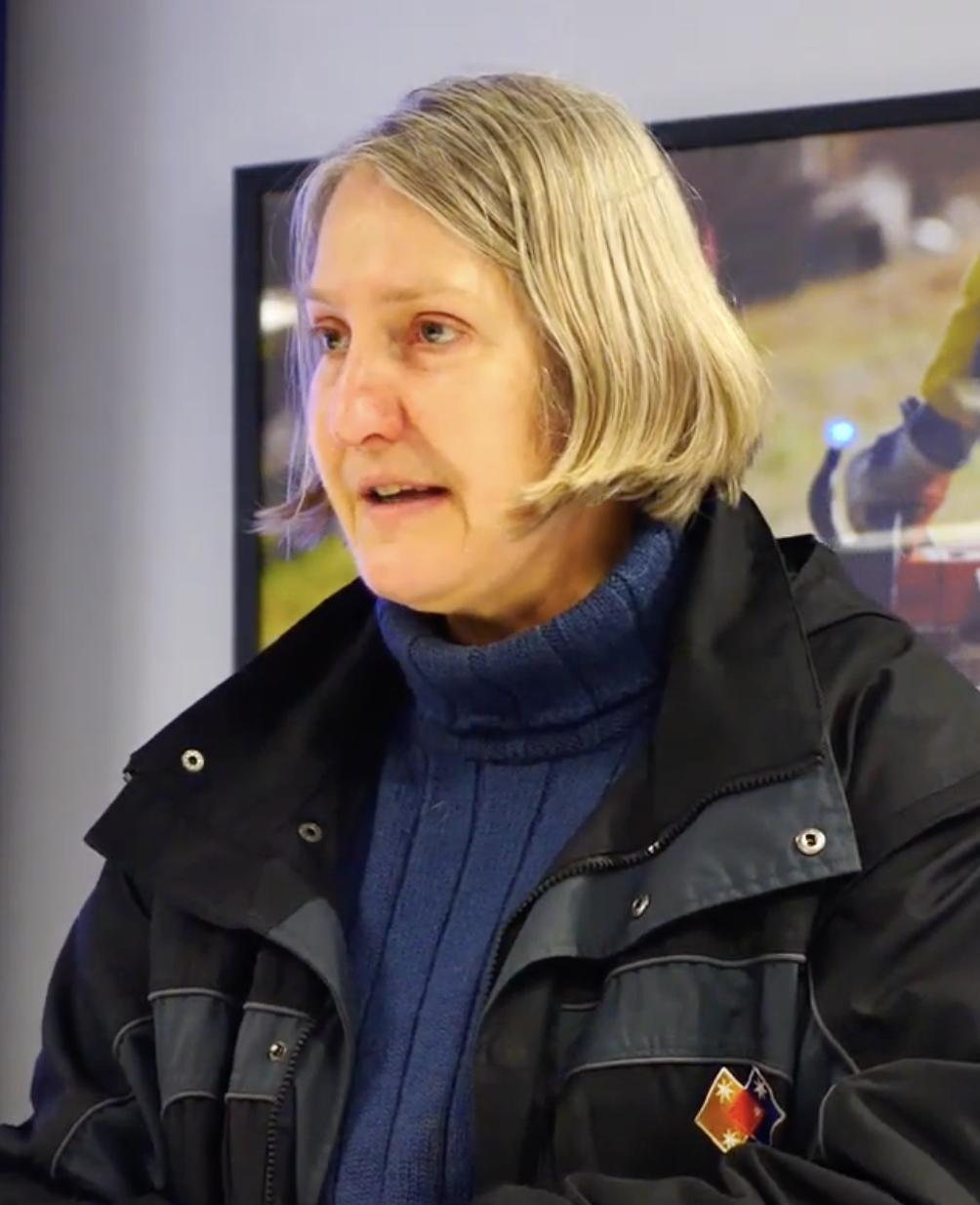
	First party	Second party	Third party
Leader	N/A	Oscar Yildiz	N/A
Party	Labor	Your Local Inds	Greens
Last election	3 seats	Did not exist	4 seats
Seats before	2	3	3
Seats won	3	2	4
Seat change	▲1	▼1 (Note: Compared to the results of Oscar Yildiz, Helen Davidson and Helen Pavlidis-Mihalakos in 2020.)	▲1
Primary vote	23,108	21,930	21,069
Percentage	24.48%	23.23%	22.32%
Swing	▲4.18	▲1.89	▲6.40
	Fourth party	Fifth party	Sixth party
		IND
Leader	N/A	N/A	Sue Bolton
Party	Socialists	Independents	Socialist Alliance
Last election	0 seats	3 seats	1 seat
Seats before	0	1	2
Seats won	0	1	1
Seat change	Steady	Steady	▼1
Primary vote	11,068	8,965	6,266
Percentage	11.72%	9.50%	6.63%
Swing	▲7.77	▼35.10	▲1.71
Largest party before election
No overall control
Subsequent largest party
Greens

Merri-bek City Council (known as Moreland until September 2022) is composed of 11 single-member wards. Prior to the 2024 election, it was composed of three multi-member wards (two four-member, one three-member), but the electoral structure has changed as a result of the Local Government Act 2020.

Labor, the Greens, the Victorian Socialists and Socialist Alliance all continued to endorse candidates. The Fusion Party endorsed Owen Miller in Bulleke-bek Ward as the party's first-ever local elections candidate. Incumbent councillor Oscar Yildiz led "Your Local Independents" with ten candidates.

=== Merri-bek results ===
2024 Victorian local elections: Merri-bek
Party	Votes	%	Swing	Seats	Change
Labor	23,108	24.48	+4.18	3	Steady
Your Local Independents	21,930	23.23	+1.89	2	▼1
Greens	21,069	22.32	+6.40	4	Steady
Victorian Socialists	11,068	11.72	+7.77	0	Steady
Independents	8,965	9.50	−35.10	1	▲1
Socialist Alliance	6,266	6.63	+1.71	1	Steady
Independent Liberal	1,621	1.71	+1.71	0	Steady
Fusion	351	0.37	+0.37	0	Steady
Formal votes	94,378	97.11			
Informal votes	2,810	2.89			
Total	97,188	100.00			
Registered voters / turnout	123,327	78.81			

=== Bababi Djinanang ===
2024 Victorian local elections: Bababi Djinanang Ward
Party	Candidate	Votes	%	±%
Socialist Alliance	Sue Bolton	4,101	46.05	+34.04 (Note: Compared to results in North-East Ward at the 2020 election.)
Labor	Hassaan Gul	2,370	26.61	+26.61
Your Local Independents	Lynton Joseph	1,444	16.21	+16.21
Greens	Lance Sinclair	991	11.13	+11.13
Total formal votes		8,906	96.83	
Informal votes		292	3.17	
Turnout		9,198	80.65	
After distribution of preferences
Socialist Alliance	Sue Bolton	4,619	51.86	+51.86
Labor	Hassaan Gul	2,656	29.82	+29.82
Your Local Independents	Lynton Joseph	1,631	18.31	+18.31
Socialist Alliance win		(new ward)		

=== Box Forest ===
2024 Victorian local elections: Box Forest Ward
Party	Candidate	Votes	%	±%
Labor	Chris Miles	3,362	37.43	+37.43
Greens	Metin Golbasi	2,239	24.93	+24.93
Victorian Socialists	Lewis Moore	1,760	19.59	+19.59
Independent Liberal	Baris Duzova	1,621	18.05	+18.05
Total formal votes		8,982	96.47	
Informal votes		329	3.53	
Turnout		9,311	76.96	
Two-candidate-preferred result
Labor	Chris Miles	4,838	53.86	+53.86
Greens	Metin Golbasi	4,144	46.14	+46.14
Labor win		(new ward)		

=== Brunswick West ===
2024 Victorian local elections: Brunswick West Ward
Party	Candidate	Votes	%	±%
Greens	Ella Svensson	2,860	35.78	+35.78
Labor	Lambros Tapinos	2,655	33.22	+14.11 (Note: Compared to results in South Ward at the 2020 election.)
Your Local Independents	Kathleen de Courcy-Browne	1,452	18.17	+18.17
Victorian Socialists	Anneke Demanuele	1,026	12.84	+12.84
Independent	Romeo Delorenzis (ineligible)	N/A	N/A	N/A
Total formal votes		7,993	97.48	
Informal votes		207	2.52	
Turnout		8,200	76.51	
Two-candidate-preferred result
Greens	Ella Svensson	4,203	52.58	+52.58
Labor	Lambros Tapinos	3,790	47.42	+47.42
Greens win		(new ward)		

=== Bulleke-bek ===
2024 Victorian local elections: Bulleke-bek Ward
Party	Candidate	Votes	%	±%
Greens	Jay Iwasaki	2,881	36.93	+36.93
Victorian Socialists	Louisa Bassini	1,795	23.01	+23.01
Labor	Helen Breier	1,561	20.01	+20.01
Independent	Mel Yuan	1,213	15.55	+15.55
Fusion	Owen Miller	351	4.50	+4.50
Total formal votes		7,801	97.66	
Informal votes		187	2.34	
Turnout		7,988	75.96	
Two-candidate-preferred result
Greens	Jay Iwasaki	4,560	58.45	+58.45
Victorian Socialists	Louisa Bassini	3,241	41.55	+41.55
Greens win		(new ward)		

=== Djirri-Djirri ===
2024 Victorian local elections: Djirri-Djirri Ward
Party	Candidate	Votes	%	±%
Your Local Independents	Helen Davidson	3,286	37.35	+22.79 (Note: Compared to results in North-West Ward at the 2020 election.)
Independent	Michelle Pitt	2,632	29.92	+29.92
Labor	Praveen Kumar	1,258	14.30	+9.14
Victorian Socialists	Wickrama Koddippuli Arachchige	615	6.99	+6.99
Independent	Smitha George	551	6.26	+6.26
Independent	Abdi Sheikh	456	5.18	+5.18
Total formal votes		8,798	97.03	
Informal votes		269	2.97	
Turnout		9,067	80.95	
Two-candidate-preferred result
Your Local Independents	Helen Davidson	4,668	53.06	+53.06
Independent	Michelle Pitt	4,130	46.94	+46.94
Your Local Independents win		(new ward)		

=== Harmony Park ===
2024 Victorian local elections: Harmony Park Ward
Party	Candidate	Votes	%	±%
Greens	Angelica Panopoulos	2,545	27.32	+17.83
Labor	Helen Politis	2,368	25.42	+25.42
Your Local Independents	Jason Clarke	1,613	17.32	+17.32
Your Local Independents	Stephen Schembri	1,223	13.13	+13.13
Socialist Alliance	Jordan Armaou-Massoud	808	8.67	+8.67
Victorian Socialists	Ruby Healer	758	8.14	+8.14
Total formal votes		9,315	97.43	
Informal votes		246	2.57	
Turnout		9,561	81.58	
Two-candidate-preferred result
Labor	Helen Politis	4,918	52.80	+52.80
Greens	Angelica Panopoulos	4,397	47.20	+47.20
Labor win		(new ward)		

=== Pascoe Vale South ===
2024 Victorian local elections: Pascoe Vale South Ward
Party	Candidate	Votes	%	±%
Your Local Independents	Oscar Yildiz	6,090	62.26	+25.88
Labor	Corey Perkins	2,207	22.56	+22.56
Victorian Socialists	Emma Dook	1,484	15.17	+15.17
Total formal votes		9,781	97.81	
Informal votes		219	2.19	
Turnout		10,000	84.18	
Your Local Independents win		(new ward)		

=== Pentridge ===
2024 Victorian local elections: Pentridge Ward
Party	Candidate	Votes	%	±%
Independent	Natalie Abboud	1,805	21.41	+21.41
Labor	Suzan Saka	1,712	20.31	+20.31
Greens	Kenna Morrison	1,360	16.13	+16.13
Your Local Independents	Daniel De Lorenzis	1,069	12.68	+12.68
Independent	Anthony Helou	1,069	12.68	+12.68
Victorian Socialists	Jasmine Duff	892	10.58	+10.58
Socialist Alliance	Jacob Andrewartha	523	6.20	+5.50
Total formal votes		8,430	96.77	
Informal votes		281	3.23	
Turnout		8,711	78.98	
Two-candidate-preferred result
Independent	Natalie Abboud	4,525	53.68	
Labor	Suzan Saka	3,905	46.32	
Independent win		(new ward)		

=== Randazzo ===
2024 Victorian local elections: Randazzo Ward
Party	Candidate	Votes	%	±%
Greens	Liz Irvin	2,717	35.30	+35.30
Your Local Independents	Voula Allimonos	2,002	26.01	+26.01
Labor	Thomas Nash	1,341	17.42	+17.42
Socialist Alliance	Felix Dance	834	10.84	+10.84
Victorian Socialists	Kosta Rologas	802	10.42	+10.42
Total formal votes		7,696	97.43	
Informal votes		203	2.57	
Turnout		7,899	75.18	
Two-candidate-preferred result
Greens	Liz Irvin	4,664	60.60	
Your Local Independents	Voula Allimonos	3,032	39.40	
Greens win		(new ward)		

=== Warrk-Warrk ===
2024 Victorian local elections: Warrk-Warrk Ward
Party	Candidate	Votes	%	±%
Greens	Adam Pulford	4,427	57.09	+40.55
Labor	Jenne Perlstein	1,958	25.25	+25.25
Victorian Socialists	Jo-Ann Hope	1,369	17.66	+17.66
Total formal votes		7,754	96.33	
Informal votes		295	3.67	
Turnout		8,049	75.10	
Greens win		(new ward)		

=== Westbreen ===
2024 Victorian local elections: Westbreen Ward
Party	Candidate	Votes	%	±%
Labor	Katerine Theodosis	2,316	25.96	+25.96
Your Local Independents	Renee Egglestone	2,002	22.44	+22.44
Your Local Independents	Helen Pavlidis-Mihalakos	1,749	19.60	+12.91
Independent	Emma Burrows	1,239	13.89	+13.89
Greens	Chloe Holmes	1,049	11.76	+11.76
Victorian Socialists	Henry Parker	567	6.36	+6.36
Total formal votes		8,922	96.94	
Informal votes		282	3.06	
Turnout		9,204	79.79	
Two-candidate-preferred result
Labor	Katerine Theodosis	4,618	51.76	
Your Local Independents	Renee Egglestone	4,304	48.24	
Labor win		(new ward)		

== Nillumbik ==
2024 Nillumbik Shire Council election
- 26 October 2024

All 7 seats on Nillumbik Shire Council 4 seats needed for a majority
Largest party before election
Independents
Subsequent largest party
Independents

Nillumbik Shire Council is composed of seven single-member wards. Nillumbik's ward structure was changed prior to the 2020 election, making this the second election with single-member wards.

The Greens endorsed two candidates, with incumbent Greens councillor Ben Ramcharan not recontesting Sugarloaf Ward. The party chose Morgan Ranieri to contest the ward, but he withdrew as a candidate on 9 September 2024. Shortly before the close of candidate nominations, the Greens replaced Ranieri with Rosemary Storey.

=== Nillumbik results ===
2024 Victorian local elections: Nillumbik
Party	Votes	%	Swing	Seats	Change
Independent	29,982	75.21		5	Steady
Greens	4,760	11.94		1	Steady
Independent Liberal	2,407	6.04		0	▼1
Independent Labor	2,390	6.00		1	▲1
Victorian Socialists	323	0.81		0	Steady
Formal votes	39,862	96.99	+0.58		
Informal votes	1,239	3.01	−0.58		
Total	41,101	100.00		7	Steady
Registered voters / turnout	47,461	86.60	−1.57		

=== Blue Lake ===
2024 Victorian local elections: Blue Lake Ward
Party	Candidate	Votes	%	±%
Independent	Grant Brooker	4,152	68.96	+38.16
Independent	David Smith	1,869	31.04	
Total formal votes		6,021	95.42	−1.20
Informal votes		289	4.58	+1.20
Turnout		6,310	87.00	+0.10
Two-candidate-preferred result
Independent gain from Independent		Swing	+20.51	

=== Bunjil ===
2024 Victorian local elections: Bunjil Ward
Party	Candidate	Votes	%	±%
Independent Labor	Naomi Joiner	2,390	44.31	
Independent Liberal	Karen Egan	1,502	27.85	−3.11
Independent	Rosie Morgan	457	8.47	
Independent	Sarah Hunter	429	7.95	+1.91
Independent	Steve Yarosz	379	7.03	
Independent	Brian Veerman	237	4.39	
Independent	Bill Penrose (ineligible)	N/A	N/A	−5.02
Total formal votes		5,394	97.89	+1.55
Informal votes		116	2.11	−1.55
Turnout		5,510	85.35	−2.68
After distribution of preferences
Independent Labor	Naomi Joiner	2,934	54.39	
Independent Liberal	Karen Egan	1,755	32.54	
Independent	Rosie Morgan	705	13.07	
Independent Labor gain from Independent Liberal				

=== Edendale ===
2024 Victorian local elections: Edendale Ward
Party	Candidate	Votes	%	±%
Independent	Kelly Joy	1,656	27.93	
Greens	Alex Grimes	1,393	23.49	
Independent	Michael Schillaci	963	16.24	
Independent	Chris Gregory	590	9.95	
Independent	Robyn Dahl	478	8.06	
Independent	Tim Jacobs	447	7.54	
Independent	Andrew Bakos	402	6.78	
Total formal votes		5,929	96.39	−0.55
Informal votes		222	3.61	+0.55
Turnout		6,151	87.96	−1.06
Two-candidate-preferred result
Independent	Kelly Joy	3,146	53.06	
Greens	Alex Grimes	2,783	46.94	
Independent gain from Independent				

=== Ellis ===
2024 Victorian local elections: Ellis Ward
Party	Candidate	Votes	%	±%
Independent	Peter Perkins	2,885	48.94	−14.69
Independent	Maria Stockman	1,456	24.70	
Independent Liberal	Darren Zilic	905	15.35	
Independent	Joe Marchio	649	11.01	
Total formal votes		5,895	97.49	−0.33
Informal votes		152	2.51	+0.33
Turnout		6,047	85.83	−1.34
After distribution of preferences
Independent	Peter Perkins	3,185	53.57	–10.06
Independent	Maria Stockman	1,663	28.21	
Independent Liberal	Darren Zilic	1,074	18.22	
Independent hold		Swing	−10.06	

=== Sugarloaf ===
2024 Victorian local elections: Sugarloaf Ward
Party	Candidate	Votes	%	±%
Independent	Murray Paternoster	1,625	31.47	
Independent	Kim Cope	1,600	30.98	+27.17
Independent	Narelle Campbell	1,098	21.26	+6.80
Greens	Rosemary Storey	516	9.99	−18.80
Independent	Christopher Steed	325	6.29	
Total formal votes		5,164	97.62	+2.62
Informal votes		126	2.38	−2.62
Turnout		5,290	84.45	−3.75
Two-candidate-preferred result
Independent	Kim Cope	2,616	50.66	
Independent	Murray Paternoster	2,548	49.34	
Independent gain from Greens				

=== Swipers Gully ===
2024 Victorian local elections: Swipers Gully Ward
Party	Candidate	Votes	%	±%
Greens	Kate McKay	2,851	46.61	
Independent	Terry Mitropoulos	1,849	30.23	
Independent	Henry Haszler	1,417	23.16	+19.38
Total formal votes		6,117	97.20	+0.01
Informal votes		176	2.80	−0.01
Turnout		6,293	87.70	−1.06
Two-candidate-preferred result
Greens	Kate McKay	3,875	63.35	
Independent	Terry Mitropoulos	2,242	36.65	
Greens gain from Independent				

=== Wingrove ===
2024 Victorian local elections: Wingrove Ward
Party	Candidate	Votes	%	±%
Independent	John Dumaresq	1,490	27.89	
Independent	Malcolm McLean	1,236	23.14	
Independent	Eve Gallagher	769	14.40	
Independent	Wayne Kinrade	606	11.34	
Independent	Roma O'Callaghan	376	7.04	
Victorian Socialists	Vivian Ballenger	323	6.05	
Independent	John Graves	273	5.11	
Independent	Rae Rancie	269	5.04	
Total formal votes		5,342	97.13	+2.39
Informal votes		158	2.87	−2.39
Turnout		5,500	87.66	−1.43
Two-candidate-preferred result
Independent	John Dumaresq	3,364	62.97	
Independent	Malcolm McLean	1,978	37.03	
Independent win				

== Whittlesea ==
2024 Whittlesea City Council election
- 26 October 2024

All 11 seats on Whittlesea City Council 6 seats needed for a majority
- Registered: 161,358
- Turnout: 81.59%

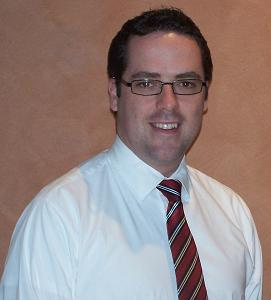
	First party	Second party	Third party
	IND
Leader	N/A	N/A	Aidan McLindon
Party	Independents	Labor	Community Inds
Last election	5 seats	5 seats	Did not exist
Seats won	5	4	2
Seat change	Steady	▼1	▲2
Primary vote	58,767	33,409	30,018
Percentage	46.41%	26.38%	23.70%
Swing			▲23.70
Largest party before election
N/A (under administration)
Subsequent largest party
No overall control

Whittlesea City Council is composed of eleven single-member wards. Prior to the 2024 election, it was composed of three multi-member wards (two four-member, one three-member), but the electoral structure has changed as a result of the Local Government Act 2020.

This is the first election for the City of Whittlesea since 2016, as the council was dismissed and put into administration in March 2020. Four former councillors − Lawrie Cox, Stevan Kozmevksi, Christine Stow and John Fry − contested the 2024 election.

Former Queensland MP Aidan McLindon led a team of 11 candidates known as "Our Community Independents", which included two Liberal Party members.

=== Whittlesea results ===
2024 Victorian local elections: Whittlesea
Party	Votes	%	Seats	Change
Independent	58,767	46.41	5	Steady
Labor	33,409	26.38	4	▼1
Community Independents	30,018	23.70	2	▲2
Greens	1,923	1.51	0	Steady
Ind. United Australia	1,327	1.04	0	Steady
Victorian Socialists	1,165	0.92	0	Steady
Formal votes	126,609	96.16		
Informal votes	5,058	3.84		
Total	131,667	100.0	11	Steady
Registered voters / turnout	161,358	81.59		

=== Bundoora ===
2024 Victorian local elections: Bundoora Ward
Party	Candidate	Votes	%	±%
Independent	Daniela Zinni	3,857	32.14	+32.14
Labor	Anthony Mancuso	2,117	17.64	+17.64
Independent	Jamie Nikolovski	1,985	16.54	+16.54
Community Independents	Richard Stockman (Note: Also a Liberal Party member.)	1,812	15.10	+15.10
Independent	Danny Hanna	648	5.40	+5.40
Independent	Marcelle Henderson	623	5.19	+5.19
Independent	Nimesh Shah	591	4.93	+4.93
Independent	Harsh Singh	367	3.06	+3.06
Total formal votes		12,000	95.63	
Informal votes		548	4.37	
Turnout		12,548	82.03	
Two-candidate-preferred result
Independent	Daniela Zinni	7,814	65.12	+65.12
Community Independents	Richard Stockman	4,186	34.88	+34.88
Independent win		(new ward)		

=== Epping ===
2024 Victorian local elections: Epping Ward
Party	Candidate	Votes	%	±%
Independent	David Lenberg	3,114	27.86	+27.86
Independent	Rachael Hussein	2,703	24.18	+24.18
Labor	Nessie Sayar	2,250	20.13	+20.13
Community Independents	Edward Sukkar	1,624	14.53	+14.53
Independent	Donny Batten	1,488	13.31	+13.31
Total formal votes		11,179	96.07	
Informal votes		457	3.93	
Turnout		11,636	80.74	
Two-candidate-preferred result
Independent	David Lenberg	5,754	51.47	+51.47
Independent	Rachael Hussein	5,425	48.53	+48.53
Independent win		(new ward)		

=== Ganbu Gulinj ===
2024 Victorian local elections: Ganbu Gulinj Ward
Party	Candidate	Votes	%	±%
Labor	Lawrie Cox	3,208	29.30	(Note: +20.36% compared to results in South West Ward at the 2016 election.)
Independent	Santosh Kaur	2,271	20.74	
Community Independents	Ursula van Bree	1,447	13.22	
Ind. United Australia	Patricia Isaac	1,327	12.12	
Independent	Ahmed Farole Muhamud	1,264	11.55	
Independent	Bineet Gujral	742	6.78	
Independent	Gulhan Yoldas	689	6.29	
Total formal votes		10,948	96.16	
Informal votes		437	3.84	
Turnout		11,385	80.56	
Two-candidate-preferred result
Labor	Lawrie Cox	5,697	52.04	
Independent	Santosh Kaur	5,251	47.96	
Labor win		(new ward)		

=== Kirrip ===
2024 Victorian local elections: Kirrip Ward
Party	Candidate	Votes	%	±%
Community Independents	Aidan McLindon	5,662	54.49	+54.49
Labor	Imran Khan	2,213	21.30	+21.30
Independent	Gurinder Kaur	1,348	12.97	+12.97
Independent	Jay Upadhyay	1,167	11.23	+11.23
Total formal votes		10,390	95.98	
Informal votes		435	4.02	
Turnout		10,825	80.57	
Community Independents win		(new ward)		

=== Lalor ===
2024 Victorian local elections: Lalor Ward
Party	Candidate	Votes	%	±%
Labor	Stevan Kozmevski	4,953	40.27	+21.26
Independent	Ellen McNaught	4,002	32.53	+32.54
Community Independents	Nicholas Hajichristou	3,346	27.20	+27.19
Total formal votes		12,301	96.68	
Informal votes		423	3.32	
Turnout		12,724	80.41	
Two-candidate-preferred result
Labor	Stevan Kozmevski	6,169	50.15	+50.15
Independent	Ellen McNaught	6,131	49.85	+49.85
Labor win		(new ward)		

==== 2025 Lalor Ward by-election ====
2025 Lalor Ward by-election (14 July–1 August 2025)
Party	Candidate	Votes	%	±%
Independent Labor	Stevan Kozmevski	2,426	22.27	−18.00 (Note: Compared to his results as an endorsed Labor candidate at the 2024 election.)
Victorian Socialists	Omar Hassan	1,686	15.47	+15.47
Independent	Belinda Stojcevski	1,343	12.33	+12.33
Independent	Ellen McNaught	1,305	11.98	−20.55
Independent	Michael Labrador	1,223	11.23	+11.23
Independent Labor	Rex Nicholson	819	7.52	+7.52
Independent Labor	Mary Krassos	579	5.31	+5.31
Independent	William Sharp	545	5.00	+5.00
Independent	Victoria Edge	460	4.22	+4.22
Independent	Samu Uprety	312	2.86	+2.86
Independent	Burhanuddin Mohammed	197	1.81	+1.81
Total formal votes		10,895	95.55	−1.13
Informal votes		507	4.45	+1.13
Turnout		11,402	74.33	−6.08
Two-candidate-preferred result
Independent	Michael Labrador	5,712	52.43	+52.43
Independent Labor	Stevan Kozmevski	5,183	47.57	−2.58
Independent gain from Labor		Swing	+52.43	

- On 13 November 2024, the Victorian Electoral Commission applied to the Victorian Civil and Administrative Tribunal (VCAT) for a review of the results in Lalor Ward after a high number of multiple returns (referring to when more than one ballot pack is returned by a voter) were detected. On 8 May 2025, VCAT voided the results in Lalor Ward, finding there was attempted and actual interference that could affect the result of the election, triggering a by-election.

=== Mernda ===
2024 Victorian local elections: Mernda Ward
Party	Candidate	Votes	%	±%
Labor	Jarrod Lappin	4,589	38.29	+38.29
Independent	William Sharp	3,912	32.64	+32.64
Community Independents	Rohit Taggar	3,484	29.07	+29.07
Total formal votes		11,985	96.79	
Informal votes		397	3.21	
Turnout		12,382	81.21	
Two-candidate-preferred result
Labor	Jarrod Lappin	6,649	55.48	+55.48
Independent	William Sharp	5,336	44.52	+44.52
Labor win		(new ward)		

=== Mill Park ===
2024 Victorian local elections: Mill Park Ward
Party	Candidate	Votes	%	±%
Independent	Blair Colwell	4,634	38.05	+38.05
Labor	John Fry	2,484	20.39	+20.39
Greens	Samantha Mason	1,923	15.79	+15.79
Independent	Robert Malivindi	1,407	11.55	+11.55
Independent	Eva Moran	924	7.59	+7.59
Community Independents	Maurice Abi Raad	808	6.63	+6.63
Total formal votes		12,180	96.48	
Informal votes		444	3.52	
Turnout		12,624	83.96	
After distribution of preferences
Independent	Blair Colwell	6,330	51.97	+51.97
Labor	John Fry	3,108	25.52	+16.04 (Note: Compared to results in South East Ward at the 2016 election.)
Greens	Samantha Mason	2,742	22.51	+22.51
Independent win		(new ward)		

=== North ===
2024 Victorian local elections: North Ward
Party	Candidate	Votes	%	±%
Independent	Christine Stow	3,110	28.57	+20.05 (Note: Compared to results in North Ward at the 2016 election.)
Independent	Phil Hurrey	2,647	24.32	+24.32
Independent	Helen Franks	2,627	24.13	+24.13
Labor	Mary Krassos	798	7.33	+7.33
Community Independents	Shashi Pal	624	5.73	+5.73
Independent	James Francis	582	5.35	+5.35
Independent	Munish Kunar Bansal	497	4.57	+4.57
Total formal votes		10,885	95.90	
Informal votes		465	4.10	
Turnout		11,350	81.33	
Two-candidate-preferred result
Independent	Christine Stow	5,954	54.70	+54.70
Independent	Helen Franks	4,931	45.30	+45.30
Independent win		(new ward)		

=== Painted Hills ===
2024 Victorian local elections: Painted Hills Ward
Party	Candidate	Votes	%	±%
Labor	Deb Gunn	5,937	51.00	+51.00
Community Independents	Ross Lee	5,705	49.00	+49.00
Total formal votes		11,642	95.18	
Informal votes		590	4.82	
Turnout		12,232	82.12	
Labor win		(new ward)		

=== South Morang ===
2024 Victorian local elections: South Morang Ward
Party	Candidate	Votes	%	±%
Independent	Martin Taylor	3,720	31.23	+31.23
Labor	Monique Lobosco	3,336	28.00	+28.00
Community Independents	Andrew Filippopoulos	3,310	27.78	+27.78
Independent	Vesna Pepe	1,547	12.99	+12.99
Total formal votes		11,913	97.29	
Informal votes		332	2.71	
Turnout		12,245	84.39	
Two-candidate-preferred result
Independent	Martin Taylor	6,400	53.72	+53.72
Labor	Monique Lobosco	5,513	46.28	+46.28
Independent win		(new ward)		

=== Thomastown ===
2024 Victorian local elections: Thomastown Ward
Party	Candidate	Votes	%	±%
Labor	Chaman Tiwari	2,248	20.09	+20.09
Community Independents	Nicholas Brooks	2,198	19.65	+19.65
Independent	Lea Thornton	1,923	17.19	+17.19
Independent	George Stavrakis	1,411	12.61	+12.61
Victorian Socialists	Sarah Garnham	1,165	10.41	+10.41
Independent	Trung Thanh Thai	1,050	9.39	+9.39
Independent	Halimah H. F. McGlashan	818	7.31	+7.31
Independent	Quentin Bai	374	3.34	+3.34
Total formal votes		11,187	95.48	
Informal votes		529	4.52	
Turnout		11,716	80.15	
Two-candidate-preferred result
Community Independents	Nicholas Brooks	5,880	52.56	+52.56
Labor	Chaman Tiwari	5,307	47.44	+47.44
Community Independents win		(new ward)		

==== 2026 Thomastown Ward by-election ====
2026 Thomastown Ward by-election (11–29 May 2025)
Party	Candidate	Votes	%	±%
Independent Labor	Chaman Tiwari	2,013	20.41	+0.32 (Note: Compared to her results as an endorsed Labor candidate at the 2024 election.)
Victorian Socialists	Sarah Garnham	1,817	18.42	+8.01
Independent	Belinda Stojcevski	1,362	13.81	+13.81
Independent Labor	Stevan Kozmevski	1,361	13.80	+13.80
Independent	Andrew Filippopoulos	1,040	10.54	+10.54
Independent Labor	Paul Seidl	982	9.96	+9.96
Independent	Edward Sukkar	590	5.98	+5.98
Independent	Joseph Paola	427	4.33	+4.33
Independent	Aryan Singh	271	2.75	+2.75
Total formal votes		9,863	95.83	+0.35
Informal votes		429	4.17	–0.35
Turnout		10,292	75.06	–5.09
Two-candidate-preferred result
Independent Labor	Chaman Tiwari	5,189	52.61	+5.17
Independent	Belinda Stojcevski	4,674	47.39	+47.39
Independent Labor gain from Community Independents		Swing	+5.17	

- By-election held after the resignation of sitting councillor Nicholas James Brooks.

== See also ==
- Results of the 2024 Victorian local elections in Eastern Melbourne
- Results of the 2024 Victorian local elections in Inner Melbourne
- Results of the 2024 Victorian local elections in South-Eastern Melbourne
- Results of the 2024 Victorian local elections in Western Melbourne
