= Kollective (disambiguation) =

Kollective or Kollective Technology Inc. is a cloud-based, software-defined enterprise content delivery network (SD-ECDN) company based in Bend, Oregon, U.S. It may also refer to:

- DFSB Kollective, South Korean music distribution company
- The Kollective, upcoming television series on Hulu
- The Melbourne Ukulele Kollective, Ukulele players in Melbourne, Australia
