= List of mayors of Darebin =

Mayor of Darebin
- Incumbent; Emily Dimitriadis since 20 November 2025
- Appointer: Darebin City Council
- Term length: 1 year
- Formation: March 1996

This is a list of mayors of the City of Darebin, a local government area in Melbourne, Victoria, Australia, which was formed in 1994 by the amalgamation of the City of Northcote and the City of Preston.

The current mayor is Emily Dimitriadis, who was voted into the position by councillors on 20 November 2025.

== Mayors ==
=== 1996–present ===
No.	Portrait	Mayor (Ward)	Party	Term start	Term end	Council control (term)
1		Royce Keirl Snr.	Labor	March 1996	March 1997	Labor majority (1996–2013)
2		Nazih Elasmar	Labor	March 1997	March 1998	Labor majority (1996–2013)
3		Chris Kelly	Labor	March 1998	March 1999	Labor majority (1996–2013)
3		Chris Kelly	Labor	March 1999	March 2000	Labor majority (1996–2013)
4		Tim Laurence	Labor	March 2000	March 2001	Labor majority (1996–2013)
5		Marlene Kairouz	Labor	March 2001	March 2002	Labor majority (1996–2013)
6		Vince Fontana	Labor	March 2002	March 2003	Labor majority (1996–2013)
7		Peter Stephenson	Labor	March 2003	March 2004	Labor majority (1996–2013)
8		Rae Perry	Labor	March 2004	November 2004 (Note: From 1996 until 2004, the annual election of the mayor for the following 12 months occurred in March. New legislation effective from 2004 onwards changed the date of the election of the mayor to November or December. There was a truncated transitional term of office from March to November 2004.)	Labor majority (1996–2013)
9		Diana Asmar	Labor	November 2004	November 2005	Labor majority (1996–2013)
10		Stanley Chiang	Labor	November 2005	November 2006	Labor majority (1996–2013)
(5)		Marlene Kairouz	Labor	November 2006	November 2007	Labor majority (1996–2013)
(7)		Peter Stephenson	Labor	November 2007	November 2008	Labor majority (1996–2013)
(9)		Diana Asmar	Labor	November 2008	November 2009	Labor majority (1996–2013)
(6)		Vince Fontana	Labor	November 2009	November 2010	Labor majority (1996–2013)
(9)		Diana Asmar	Labor	November 2010	November 2011	Labor majority (1996–2013)
11		Steven Tsitas	Labor	November 2011	November 2012	Labor majority (1996–2013)
(4)		Tim Laurence	Labor	November 2012	November 2013	Labor majority (1996–2013)
12		Gaetano Greco	Labor	November 2013	June 2014	No overall control (2013–2024)
(12)		Gaetano Greco	Independent	June 2014	November 2014	No overall control (2013–2024)
(11)		Steve Tsitas	Labor	November 2014	November 2015	No overall control (2013–2024)
(6)		Vince Fontana	Independent	November 2015	November 2016	No overall control (2013–2024)
13		Kim Le Cerf (Rucker)	Greens	November 2016	November 2017	No overall control (2013–2024)
13		Kim Le Cerf (Rucker)	Greens	November 2017	26 November 2018	No overall control (2013–2024)
14		Susan Rennie (Rucker)	Independent	26 November 2018	November 2019	No overall control (2013–2024)
14		Susan Rennie (Rucker)	Independent	November 2019	November 2020	No overall control (2013–2024)
15		Lina Messina (Central)	Independent	November 2020	November 2021	No overall control (2013–2024)
15		Lina Messina (Central)	Independent	November 2021	30 November 2022	No overall control (2013–2024)
16		Julie Williams (North Central)	Independent	30 November 2022	30 November 2023	No overall control (2013–2024)
17		Susanne Newton (West)	Greens	30 November 2023	25 November 2024	No overall control (2013–2024)
18		Kristine Olaris (Central)	Labor	25 November 2024	20 November 2025	Labor majority (2024–present)
19		Emily Dimitriadis (South East)	Labor	20 November 2025	Incumbent	Labor majority (2024–present)

== Deputy mayors ==
No.	Portrait	Deputy Mayor (Ward)	Party	Term start	Term end	Mayor
		Susanne Newton (West)	Greens	30 November 2022	30 November 2023	Williams (Labor)
		Tim Laurence (North East)	Labor	30 November 2023	25 November 2024	Newton (Greens)
		Emily Dimitriadis (South East)	Labor	25 November 2024	20 November 2025	Olaris (Labor)
		Matt Arturi (North East)	Labor	20 November 2025	Incumbent	Dimitriadis (Labor)
