= Results of the 2020 Victorian local elections in Northern Melbourne =

2020 Victorian local elections (Northern Melbourne)
← 2016	24 October 2020	2024 →

This is a list of results for the 2020 Victorian local elections in the Northern Melbourne region.

Northern Melbourne covers the local government areas (LGAs) of Banyule, Darebin, Hume, Moreland, Nillumbik and Whittlesea.

== Banyule ==
2020 Banyule City Council election
← 2016	24 October 2020	2024 →

All 9 seats on Banyule City Council 5 seats needed for a majority
- Registered: 95,506
- Turnout: 84.71%
	First party	Second party	Third party
	IND		IND
Party	Independent	Greens	Ind. Labor
Last election	5 seats	1 seats	1 seats
Seats before	5	1	1
Seats won	5	2	2
Seat change	Steady	▲1	▲1
First preference vote	57,081	9,975	7,535
Percentage	72.41%	12.65%	9.56%
- 2020 and 2024 ward boundaries. Expand the map and click on a ward to see the ward name
Largest party before election
Independents
Subsequent largest party
Independents

Banyule City Council is composed of nine single-member wards. In the 2016 election, Banyule City Council had seven single-member wards.

=== Banyule results ===
2020 Victorian local elections: Banyule
Party	Votes	%	Seats	Change
Independent	57,081	72.41	5	Steady
Greens	9,975	12.65	2	▲1
Independent Labor	7,535	9.56	2	▲1
Independent Liberal	3,542	4.49	0	Steady
Animal Justice	699	0.89	0	Steady
Formal votes	78,832	97.44		
Informal votes	2,074	2.56		
Total	80,906		9	

=== Bakewell ===
2020 Victorian local elections: Bakewell Ward
Party	Candidate	Votes	%	±%
Independent	Mark Di Pasquale	3,098	34.55	
Independent	Katie George	2,661	29.68	
Independent	Brian Grace	1,871	20.87	
Independent	Gary Sammartino	1,337	14.91	
Total formal votes		8,967	97.49	
Informal votes		231	2.51	
Turnout		9,198	83.38	
Two-candidate-preferred result
Independent	Mark Di Pasquale	4,626	51.59	
Independent	Katie George	4,341	48.41	
Independent hold		Swing	N/A	

=== Beale ===
2020 Victorian local elections: Beale Ward
Party	Candidate	Votes	%	±%
Independent	Wayne Phillips	3,332	36.05	−15.44
Independent Labor	Elizabeth Nealy	2,818	30.49	
Greens	Michael Copsey	975	10.55	
Independent	Brad Moloney	893	9.66	
Independent	Robert John Cricco	655	7.09	
Independent	Mark Dixon	298	3.22	
Independent	Jonah Allen	271	2.93	
Total formal votes		9,242	97.82	
Informal votes		206	2.18	
Turnout		9,448	87.95	
Two-candidate-preferred result
Independent Labor	Elizabeth Nealy	5,055	54.70	
Independent	Wayne Phillips	4,187	45.30	−6.19
Independent Labor win		Swing	N/A	

=== Chelsworth ===
2020 Victorian local elections: Chelsworth Ward
Party	Candidate	Votes	%	±%
Greens	Alida McKern	1,684	20.18	
Independent	Carl Ziebell	1,583	18.97	
Independent	Emma Samuel	1,098	13.16	
Independent	Jeremy Crocker	949	11.37	
Independent	Amina Liban	692	8.29	
Independent	Tanya Dillon	500	5.99	
Independent	Chris Dixon	485	5.81	
Independent	Emily Fenton	480	5.75	
Independent	Houwaida Ayoub	299	3.58	
Independent	Dora Bergman	227	2.72	
Independent	Kevin Biaggini	220	2.64	
Independent	Peter Mazurczuk	126	1.51	
Total formal votes		8,343	96.38	
Informal votes		313	3.62	
Turnout		8,656	85.83	
Two-candidate-preferred result
Greens	Alida McKern	4,273	51.22	
Independent	Carl Ziebell	4,070	48.78	
Greens win		Swing	N/A	

=== Griffin ===
2020 Victorian local elections: Griffin Ward
Party	Candidate	Votes	%	±%
Greens	Peter Castaldo	3,303	37.84	+4.81
Independent Liberal	Jenny Mulholland	2,569	29.43	−5.18
Independent	Kate Rutherford	1,013	11.61	
Independent	Kerry-Anne Benton	798	9.14	
Animal Justice	Bev Moss	699	8.01	
Independent	Helen Steel	346	3.96	
Total formal votes		8,782	98.20	
Informal votes		160	1.80	
Turnout		8,888	85.00	
Two-candidate-preferred result
Greens	Peter Castaldo	4,925	56.43	−0.95
Independent Liberal	Jenny Mulholland	3,803	43.57	+0.95
Greens hold		Swing	−0.95	

=== Grimshaw ===
2020 Victorian local elections: Grimshaw Ward
Party	Candidate	Votes	%	±%
Independent Labor	Rick Garotti	4,717	51.30	
Independent	Stephen Wade	1,784	19.40	
Independent	Toafa McLean	1,477	16.06	
Independent	Raj Bhatia	1,217	13.24	
Total formal votes		9,195	97.63	
Informal votes		223	2.37	
Turnout		9,418	86.24	
Two-candidate-preferred result
Independent Labor hold		Swing	N/A	

=== Hawdon ===
2020 Victorian local elections: Hawdon Ward
Party	Candidate	Votes	%	±%
Independent	Fiona Mitsinikos	1,746	18.51	
Greens	Emily Beiber	1,732	18.36	
Independent	Michael Haworth	1,677	17.78	
Independent	Emila Williams	1,361	14.43	
Independent	Nola McDowell	1,226	13.00	
Independent	Anthony Fernandez	915	9.70	
Independent	Tracey Robson-Garth	776	8.23	
Total formal votes		9,433	97.49	
Informal votes		243	2.51	
Turnout		9,676	87.45	
Two-candidate-preferred result
Independent	Fiona Mitsinikos	5,154	54.64	
Independent	Emila Williams	4,279	45.36	
Independent hold		Swing	N/A	

=== Ibbott ===
2020 Victorian local elections: Ibbott Ward
Party	Candidate	Votes	%	±%
Independent	Tom Melican	5,962	72.33	−3.73
Greens	Matthew Goodman	2,281	27.67	
Total formal votes		8,243	97.18	
Informal votes		239	2.82	
Turnout		8,482	85.22	
Two-candidate-preferred result
Independent	Tom Melican	5,962	72.33	−3.73
Greens	Matthew Goodman	2,281	27.67	
Independent hold		Swing	−3.73	

=== Olympia ===
2020 Victorian local elections: Olympia Ward
Party	Candidate	Votes	%	±%
Independent	Craig Langdon	2,253	28.97	−37.22
Independent	Peter Dimarelos	1,617	20.79	
Independent	Shirley Deviesseux	1,316	16.92	
Independent Liberal	Kevan Hill	973	12.51	
Independent	Martyn Wild	863	11.10	
Independent	Karen-Joy McColl	756	9.72	
Total formal votes		7,778	97.29	
Informal votes		217	2.71	
Turnout		7,995	75.77	
Two-candidate-preferred result
Independent	Peter Dimarelos	4,583	58.92	
Independent	Craig Langdon	3,195	41.08	−25.11
Independent hold		Swing	N/A	

=== Sherbourne ===
2024 Victorian local elections: Sherbourne Ward
Party	Candidate	Votes	%	±%
Independent	Alison Champion	3,603	40.47	
Independent	Leanne Townson	2,306	25.90	
Independent	Michelle Giovas	1,681	18.88	
Independent	Dani Vidler	1,313	14.75	
Total formal votes		8,903	97.35	
Informal votes		242	2.65	
Turnout		9,145	85.48	
Two-candidate-preferred result
Independent	Alison Champion	5,344	60.02	
Independent	Leanne Townson	3,559	39.98	
Independent hold		Swing	N/A	

== Darebin ==
The Labor Party did not officially endorse candidates in Darebin. However, ten party members contested as part of the "Labor Members for Darebin" group (including one who was later disendorsed) and a further four contested as Independent Labor candidates, without support from the group or an official party endorsement.

2020 Victorian local elections: Darebin
Party	Votes	%	Seats	Change
Independent	26,794	29.05	3	Steady
Greens	22,661	24.57	3	▼1
Darebin Labor	20,519	22.24	3	▲1
Victorian Socialists	6,977	7.56	0	Steady
Independent Labor	4,939	5.35	0	Steady
Save The Planet	2,934	3.18	0	Steady
Reason	1,913	2.07	0	Steady
Independent Liberal	1,853	2.01	0	Steady
Liberal Democrats	899	0.97	0	Steady

=== Central ===
2020 Victorian local elections: Central Ward
Party	Candidate	Votes	%	±%
Greens	Esther Kennedy	2,391	25.83	+25.83
Independent	Lina Messina	2,339	25.27	+13.70 (Note: Compared with results in the former Cazaly Ward at the 2016 election.)
Darebin Labor	Peter Gonis	1,249	13.50	+13.50
Independent Labor	Jim Shen	1,226	13.25	+13.25
Victorian Socialists	Omar Hassan	808	8.73	+8.73
Independent	Craig Walters	571	6.17	+2.95
Independent	Brendan John Cameron	457	4.94	+4.94
Independent Labor	Nalliah Suriyakumaran	214	2.31	+0.88
Turnout		9,583	78.72	
Two-candidate-preferred result
Independent	Lina Messina	4,712	50.91	N/A
Greens	Esther Kennedy	4,543	49.09	N/A
Independent win		(new ward)		

=== North Central ===
2020 Victorian local elections: North Central Ward
Party	Candidate	Votes	%	±%
Darebin Labor	Julie Williams	3,049	32.86	+21.63
Greens	Monique Keel	1,768	19.05	+19.05
Independent	Jessica Sullivan	1,212	13.06	+13.06
Independent	Benny Pascuzzi	967	10.42	+10.42
Victorian Socialists	Seb Evans	740	7.97	+7.97
Independent	Melanie Triantafillidis	617	6.65	+2.84
Independent Labor	Louise Shen-Kenney	605	6.52	+6.52
Independent	Alice Maddineni	321	3.46	+2.56 (Note: Compared with results in the former La Trobe Ward at the 2016 election.)
Turnout		9,610	78.35	
Two-candidate-preferred result
Darebin Labor	Julie Williams	5,441	58.64	N/A
Greens	Monique Keel	3,838	41.36	N/A
Darebin Labor win		(new ward)		

=== North East ===
2020 Victorian local elections: North East Ward
Party	Candidate	Votes	%	±%
Darebin Labor	Tim Laurence	3,371	34.78	+18.97
Independent	Adam Cursio	1,917	19.78	+19.78
Save The Planet	Bryony Edwards	1,438	14.84	+10.62 (Note: Compared with results in the former Rucker Ward at the 2016 election.)
Victorian Socialists	Steven Chang	847	8.74	+8.74
Independent	Greg Chiminello	737	7.60	+7.60
Greens	Dave Lee	648	6.69	+6.69
Independent	Kush Singh	426	4.40	+4.40
Independent	Lutvi Tair	308	3.18	+2.45
Turnout		10,055	81.66	
Two-candidate-preferred result
Darebin Labor	Tim Laurence	5,503	56.78	N/A
Independent	Adam Cursio	4,189	43.22	N/A
Darebin Labor win		(new ward)		

=== North West ===
2020 Victorian local elections: North West Ward
Party	Candidate	Votes	%	±%
Independent	Gaetano Greco	4,014	39.84	+18.43
Reason	Carmen Lahiff-Jenkins	1,913	18.99	+18.99
Independent Labor	Sofia Kotanidis (Note: Disendorsed by Labor Members for Darebin.)	1,917	18.69	+13.41
Independent Labor	Douglas Leitch	977	9.70	+9.70
Greens	Alec Wilmot	719	7.14	+7.14
Victorian Socialists	Adam Bottomley	570	5.66	+5.66
Turnout		10,459	82.35	
Two-candidate-preferred result
Independent	Gaetano Greco	6,091	60.45	N/A
Reason	Carmen Lahiff-Jenkins	3,985	39.55	N/A
Independent win		(new ward)		

=== South ===
2020 Victorian local elections: South Ward
Party	Candidate	Votes	%	±%
Greens	Tom Hannan	4,063	37.73	+35.96
Darebin Labor	Chiara Lawry	2,960	27.49	+27.49
Independent	Zac Galbally	1,717	15.94	+15.94
Independent	Hugh Morris-Dalton	1,546	14.36	+14.36
Victorian Socialists	Liam Ward	483	4.49	+4.49
Turnout		10,975	81.34	
Two-candidate-preferred result
Greens	Tom Hannan	5,883	54.63	N/A
Darebin Labor	Chiara Lawry	4,886	45.37	N/A
Greens win		(new ward)		

=== South Central ===
2020 Victorian local elections: South Central Ward
Party	Candidate	Votes	%	±%
Independent	Susan Rennie	3,564	35.54	+21.30
Greens	Harriet De Kok	1,992	19.87	+19.87
Darebin Labor	Peter Willis	1,506	15.02	+15.02
Independent	Kathy Zisiadis	883	8.81	+8.81
Victorian Socialists	Roz Ward	774	7.72	+7.72
Darebin Labor	Ash Verma	643	6.41	+1.98
Independent	Agapi Pashos	480	4.79	+4.79
Independent	Ross Dabscheck	185	1.85	+0.20
Turnout		10,337	78.85	
Two-candidate-preferred result
Independent	Susan Rennie	6,110	60.94	N/A
Greens	Harriet De Kok	3,917	39.06	N/A
Independent win		(new ward)		

=== South East ===
2020 Victorian local elections: South East Ward
Party	Candidate	Votes	%	±%
Darebin Labor	Emily Dimitriades	4,626	43.91	+43.91
Greens	Julie O'Brien	2,641	25.07	+25.07
Independent Liberal	Oliver Walsh	1,853	17.59	+17.59
Save The Planet	Philip David Sutton	711	6.75	+6.75
Victorian Socialists	Jess Lenehan	703	6.67	+6.67
Turnout		10,827	82.13	
Two-candidate-preferred result
Darebin Labor	Emily Dimitriades	6,185	58.71	N/A
Greens	Julie O'Brien	4,349	41.29	N/A
Darebin Labor win		(new ward)		

=== South West ===
2020 Victorian local elections: South West Ward
Party	Candidate	Votes	%	±%
Greens	Trent McCarthy	4,138	43.91	+24.88
Darebin Labor	Nick McCubbin	2,036	22.03	+18.82
Liberal Democrats	Archibald Maclean	899	9.73	+9.73
Save The Planet	Adrian Whitehead	785	8.49	+6.44
Victorian Socialists	Ali Hogg	714	7.72	+7.72
Independent	Brian Sangahan	671	7.26	+7.26
Turnout		9,493	82.29	
After distribution of preferences
Greens	Trent McCarthy	4,645	50.25	N/A
Darebin Labor	Nick McCubbin	2,409	26.06	N/A
Liberal Democrats	Archibald Maclean	1,158	12.53	N/A
Save The Planet	Adrian Whitehead	1,031	11.15	N/A
Greens win		(new ward)		

=== West ===
2020 Victorian local elections: West Ward
Party	Candidate	Votes	%	±%
Greens	Susanne Newton	4,304	40.67	+26.31
Independent	Vasilios Tsalkos	1,411	13.33	+13.33
Victorian Socialists	George Kanjere	1,338	12.64	+12.64
Independent	Samuel Fontana	1,324	12.51	+12.51
Independent	John Mercuri	1,127	10.65	+6.84
Darebin Labor	Isabel Jackson	1,079	10.20	+7.41
Turnout		10,886	81.66	
After distribution of preferences
Greens	Susanne Newton	5,783	54.64	N/A
Independent	Vasilios Tsalkos	2,698	25.49	N/A
Independent	Vasilios Tsalkos	2,102	19.86	N/A
Greens win		(new ward)		

== Moreland ==
2020 Victorian local elections: Moreland
Party	Votes	%	Swing	Seats	Change
Independent	41,866	44.60	+4.16	3	▼1
Labor	20,901	20.30	−8.30	3	▲1
Greens	16,396	15.92	−13.92	4	Steady
Sue Bolton Moreland Team	5,062	4.92	+0.21	1	Steady
Reason	4,637	4.50	+4.50	0	Steady
Victorian Socialists	4,068	3.95	+3.95	0	Steady
Animal Justice	935	0.91	+0.91	0	Steady

=== North-East ===
2020 Victorian local elections: North-East Ward
Party	Candidate	Votes	%	±%
Labor	Annalivia Hannan	5,983	16.19	+4.94
Greens	Adam Pulford	5,618	15.20	−7.42
Sue Bolton Moreland Team	Sue Bolton	4,079	11.04	−1.99
Independent	Paul Failla	2,307	6.14	−2.40
Independent	Helen Pavlidis-Mihalakos	2,271	6.14	+1.65
Independent	Jason Clarke	1,979	5.35	+5.35
Labor	Ismene Thiveos	1,736	4.70	+4.70
Independent	Anthony Helou	1,420	3.84	−1.80
Independent	Hamza Dhedy	1,278	3.46	+3.46
Labor	Rebekah Hogan	1,197	3.24	+3.24
Independent	Francesco Timpano	1,149	3.11	−0.26
Reason	Margee Glover	1,039	2.81	+2.81
Independent	Dean O'Callaghan	652	1.76	+1.76
Independent	Haissam Naim	622	1.68	+1.68
Greens	Muhammad Ul Murrtaza	531	1.44	+0.24
Independent	Rasheed Elachkar	500	1.35	+1.35
Independent	Gloria Farah	391	1.06	+1.06
Sue Bolton Moreland Team	Meghan Street	153	0.41	+0.41
Turnout		36,957	79.41	
Greens hold		Swing	−7.42	
Labor hold		Swing	+4.94	
Sue Bolton Moreland Team hold		Swing	−1.99	
Independent gain from Independent		Swing		

=== North-West ===
2020 Victorian local elections: North-West Ward
Party	Candidate	Votes	%	±%
Independent	Oscar Yildiz	12,884	36.38	+7.94
Independent	Helen Davidson	5,155	14.56	+3.70
Greens	Angelica Panopoulos	3,361	9.49	−6.20
Labor	Milad El-Halabi	2,109	5.95	+2.17
Labor	Praveen Kumar	1,826	5.16	+5.16
Victorian Socialists	Daniel Taylor	1,490	4.21	+4.21
Independent	Shaun Minehan	1,326	3.74	+0.34
Sue Bolton Moreland Team	Monica Harte	1,286	3.63	+3.63
Independent	Lou Tenace	1,058	2.99	+2.99
Animal Justice	Chris Miles	935	2.64	+2.64
Independent	Shanaka T. Perera	932	2.63	+2.63
Independent	Mohamad Elmustapha	779	2.20	+2.20
Independent	Georgios Karantzalis	586	1.65	+1.65
Independent	Alesio Mulipola	499	1.41	+1.41
Independent	Baris Duzova	438	1.24	+1.24
Independent	Darren Grindrod	427	1.21	+1.21
Independent	Catherine Bonacci-Rocca	326	0.92	+0.92
Turnout		38,451	80.81	
Independent hold		Swing	+7.94	
Independent hold		Swing	+3.70	
Greens hold		Swing	−6.20	
Labor hold		Swing	+2.17	

=== South ===
2020 Victorian local elections: South Ward
Party	Candidate	Votes	%	±%
Labor	Lambros Tapinos	4,924	19.11	+4.88
Greens	Mark Riley	4,621	17.93	+15.86
Victorian Socialists	Nahui Jimenez	2,578	10.00	+10.00
Greens	James Conlan	2,265	8.79	+8.79
Reason	Rachel Payne	2,247	8.72	+8.72
Independent	John Durrant	2,018	7.83	+7.83
Labor	Helen Breier	1,532	5.94	+5.94
Independent	Shea Evans	1,351	5.24	+5.24
Labor	Shirley Jackson	1,095	4.25	+4.25
Independent	Melissa Yuan	1,037	4.02	+1.60
Independent	George Georgiou	788	3.06	+3.06
Independent	Pauline Galvin	649	2.52	+2.52
Independent	Sultan Taraby	424	1.65	+1.65
Sue Bolton Moreland Team	Jacob Andrewartha	181	0.70	+0.70
Independent	Robert Durkacz	60	0.23	+0.23
Turnout		27,568	73.50	
Labor hold		Swing	+4.88	
Greens hold		Swing	+15.86	
Greens hold		Swing	+8.79	
