= The Melbourne Ukulele Kollective =

Ukulele players in Melbourne

M.U.K., the Melbourne Ukulele Kollective was formed in March 2004 by Dean 'Dino Divo' Denham to provide a vehicle for the large number of ukulele players that reside in Melbourne, both amateur and professional, to perform and exchange ukulele related information, tunes and technique. MUK also establishes links with schools and community groups and conducts regular ukulele workshops in both playing and making of ukuleles.

The Kollective holds monthly “Open MUK” gigs, at which uke’ers can get up and have a play, swap tunes, and meet others.

The Kollective has hosted the Melbourne Ukulele Festival (MUF) and the associated Pimp My M.U.F. a decorative display of custom painted and decorated ukuleles. Now in its fourth year, the Festival centres on the fair City of Darebin in Melbourne's north. The 2014 festival runs from March 7-9.

- M.U.K Melbourne Ukulele Kollective
- Melbourne Ukulele Festival
- Melbourne Ukulele Festival on Facebook
- Melbourne Ukulele Kollective on MySpace

== Notable Performances ==
=== 2005 ===
- Port Fairy Folk Festival
- Darebin Music Feast
- Brunswick Festival
- Friends of the Earth Annual Ball

=== 2006 ===
- Brunswick Music Festival
- Moomba Parade
- ABC-TV's Spicks and Specks

=== 2008 ===
- St Kilda Festival
- Adelaide Fringe Festival
- The Evenings program with Derek Guille on 774 ABC Melbourne and ABC Victoria
- The Famous Spiegeltent (22 October)

=== 2010 ===
- Melbourne Ukulele Festival 2010
- Darebin Music Feast - 'Anarchy in the MUK'

=== 2011 ===
- Melbourne Ukulele Festival 2011
- Brunswick Music Festival
- Ballarat Show

=== 2012 ===
- Melbourne Ukulele Festival 2012
- The Famous Spiegeltent

== Awards ==
- Best Family Show for Melbourne Fringe 2004

== Music Styles ==
- Old School Hawaiian
- Jazz
- Show tunes
- Vaudeville
- Blues
- Country
- Punk/Riot
- Trance
- Experimental
- Deconstructionist
