= City of Darebin =

Coordinates: 37°44′S 145°01′E

- Local government area
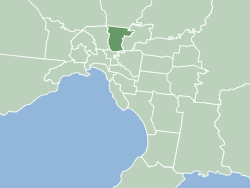
- Map of Melbourne showing City of Darebin

- Interactive map of City of Darebin
- Country: Australia
- State: Victoria
- Region: Greater Melbourne
- Established: 1994
- Council seat: Preston

Government
  - Mayor: Emily Dimitriadis
  - State electorates: Bundoora; Northcote; Preston
  - Federal division: Cooper

Area
  - Total: 54 km^{2} (21 sq mi)

Population
  - Total: 161,609 (2018) (48th)
  - Density: 2,993/km^{2} (7,750/sq mi)
- Website: City of Darebin
LGAs around City of Darebin
Hume	Whittlesea	Banyule
Merri-bek	City of Darebin	Banyule
Yarra	Yarra	Boroondara

The City of Darebin (/ˈdærəbən/) is a local government area in Victoria, Australia, in the northern suburbs of Melbourne. It has an area of 54 square kilometres (20.8 sq mi) and in June 2018 Darebin had a population of 161,609. Municipal offices are located at 350 High Street, Preston.

Darebin was rated 386th of 590 Australian Local Government Areas in the BankWest Quality of Life Index 2008.

== History ==
The City of Darebin was formed in 1994 with the merger of most of the former Cities of Northcote and Preston, with the transfer of the portion of the City of Northcote of Heidelberg Road to the City of Yarra and minor adjustments with the former Cities of Coburg, Heidelberg and the Shire of Diamond Valley.

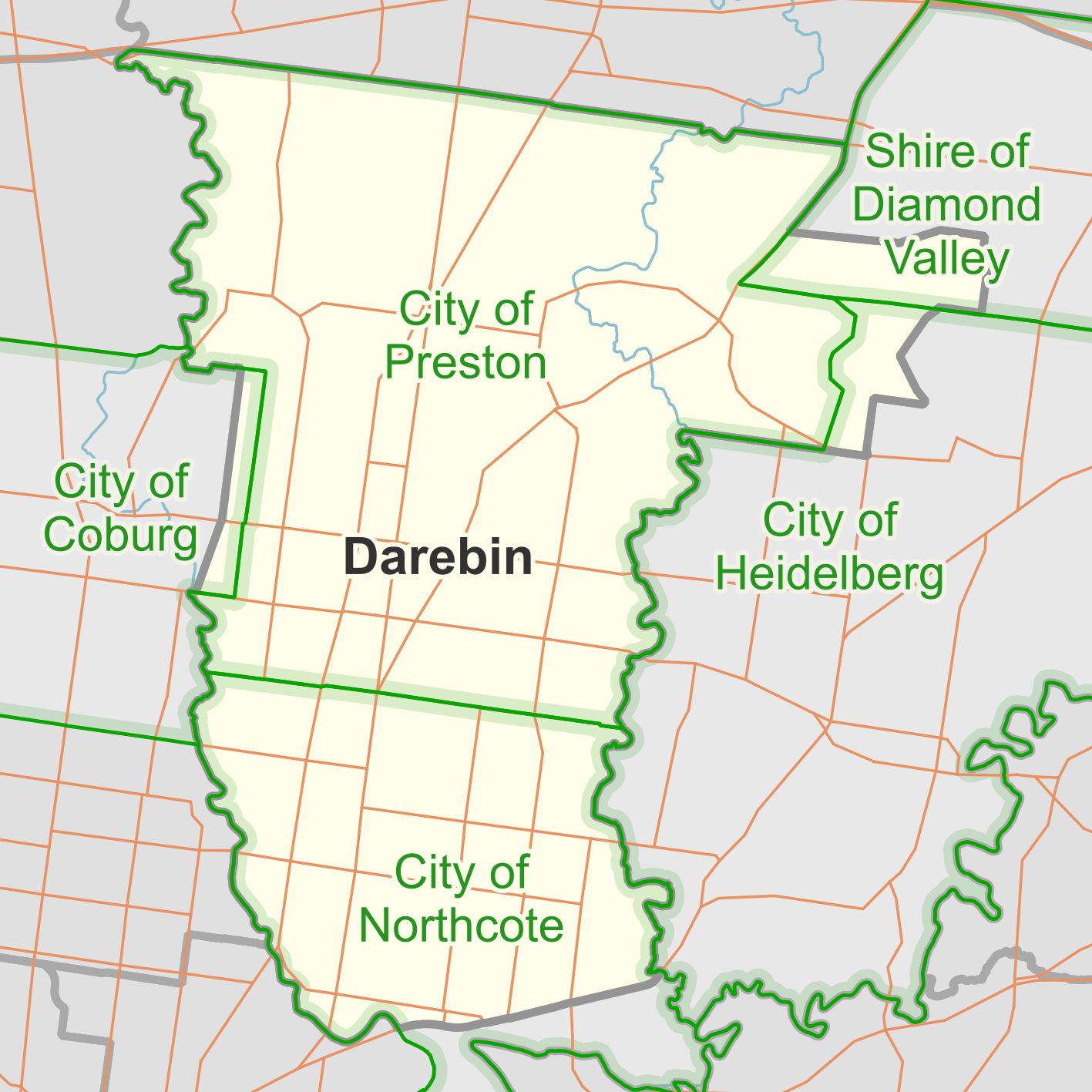
The City of Darebin's predecessor LGAs (green) as they were in 1994

== Council ==
=== Current composition ===
Darebin is divided into nine single-member wards, each elected through preferential voting. Prior to 2020, councillors were elected from three multi-member wards.

As of 2026, the councillors are:

Party	Councillors
Labor	4
Greens	3
Independent	2
Total	9

Ward	Party	Councillor	Notes
Central	Labor	Kristine Olaris	
North Central	Labor	Vasilios Tsalkos	
North East	Labor	Matt Arturi	Deputy Mayor
North West	Independent	Angela Villella	
South	Greens	Julie O'Brien	
South Central	Greens	Ruth Jelley	
South East	Labor	Emily Dimitriadis	Mayor
South West	Greens	Alexandra Sangster	
West	Independent	Connie Boglis	Labor 2024-25, Independent 2026-

== Past councillors ==
=== 2020−present ===
Year	Central	North Central	North East	North West	South	South Central	South East	South West	West
Year	Councillor	Councillor	Councillor	Councillor	Councillor	Councillor	Councillor	Councillor	Councillor
2020	Lina Messina (Ind)	Julia Williams (Labor/Ind)	Tim Laurence (Labor/Ind)	Gaetano Greco (Ind)	Tom Hannan (Greens)	Susan Rennie (Ind)	Emily Dimitriadis (Labor)	Trent McCarthy (Greens)	Susanne Newton (Greens)
2024	Lina Messina (Ind)	Julia Williams (Labor/Ind)	Tim Laurence (Labor/Ind)	Gaetano Greco (Ind)	Tom Hannan (Greens)	Susan Rennie (Ind)	Emily Dimitriadis (Labor)	Trent McCarthy (Greens)	Susanne Newton (Greens)
2024	Kristine Olaris (Labor)	Vasilios Tsalkos (Labor)	Matt Arturi (Labor)	Gaetano Greco (Ind)	Julie O'Brien (Greens)	Ruth Jelley (Greens)	Emily Dimitriadis (Labor)	Alexandra Sangster (Greens)	Connie Boglis (Labor/Ind)
2025	Kristine Olaris (Labor)	Vasilios Tsalkos (Labor)	Matt Arturi (Labor)	Angela Villella (Note: Elected in a by-election following the death of the previous councillor.) (Ind)	Julie O'Brien (Greens)	Ruth Jelley (Greens)	Emily Dimitriadis (Labor)	Alexandra Sangster (Greens)	Connie Boglis (Labor/Ind)
2026	Kristine Olaris (Labor)	Vasilios Tsalkos (Labor)	Matt Arturi (Labor)	Angela Villella (Ind)	Julie O'Brien (Greens)	Ruth Jelley (Greens)	Emily Dimitriadis (Labor)	Alexandra Sangster (Greens)	Connie Boglis (Labor/Ind)

== Election results ==
=== 2024 ===
2024 Victorian local elections: Darebin
Party	Votes	%	Swing	Seats	Change
Independent	28,746	34.54	+5.49	1	▼2
Labor	25,905	31.13	+8.89 (Note: Compared to the Labor Members for Darebin result at the 2020 election.)	5	▲2
Greens	19,418	23.33	−1.24	3	Steady
Victorian Socialists	9,634	11.58	+4.02	0	Steady
Total	83,219	100.00		9	Steady
Informal votes	3,093	3.58			
Turnout	86,312	79.76			
Enrolled voters	108,217				

=== 2020 ===
The Labor Party did not officially endorse candidates in Darebin. However, ten party members contested as part of the "Labor Members for Darebin" group (including one who was later disendorsed) and a further four contested as Independent Labor candidates, without support from the group or an official party endorsement.

2020 Victorian local elections: Darebin
Party	Votes	%	Seats	Change
Independent	26,794	29.05	3	Steady
Greens	22,661	24.57	3	▼1
Darebin Labor	20,519	22.24	3	▲1
Victorian Socialists	6,977	7.56	0	Steady
Independent Labor	4,939	5.35	0	Steady
Save The Planet	2,934	3.18	0	Steady
Reason	1,913	2.07	0	Steady
Independent Liberal	1,853	2.01	0	Steady
Liberal Democrats	899	0.97	0	Steady

== Townships and localities ==
At the 2021 census, the city had a population of 148,570 up from 146,719 at the 2016 census.

Population
Locality	2016	2021
Alphington^	5,080	5,702
Bundoora^	28,653	28,068
Fairfield^	6,558	6,535
Kingsbury	3,780	3,460
Macleod^	9,769	9,892
Northcote	24,561	25,276
Preston	32,851	33,790
Reservoir	50,474	51,096
Thornbury	18,568	19,005

^ - Territory divided with another LGA

== Economy of Darebin ==
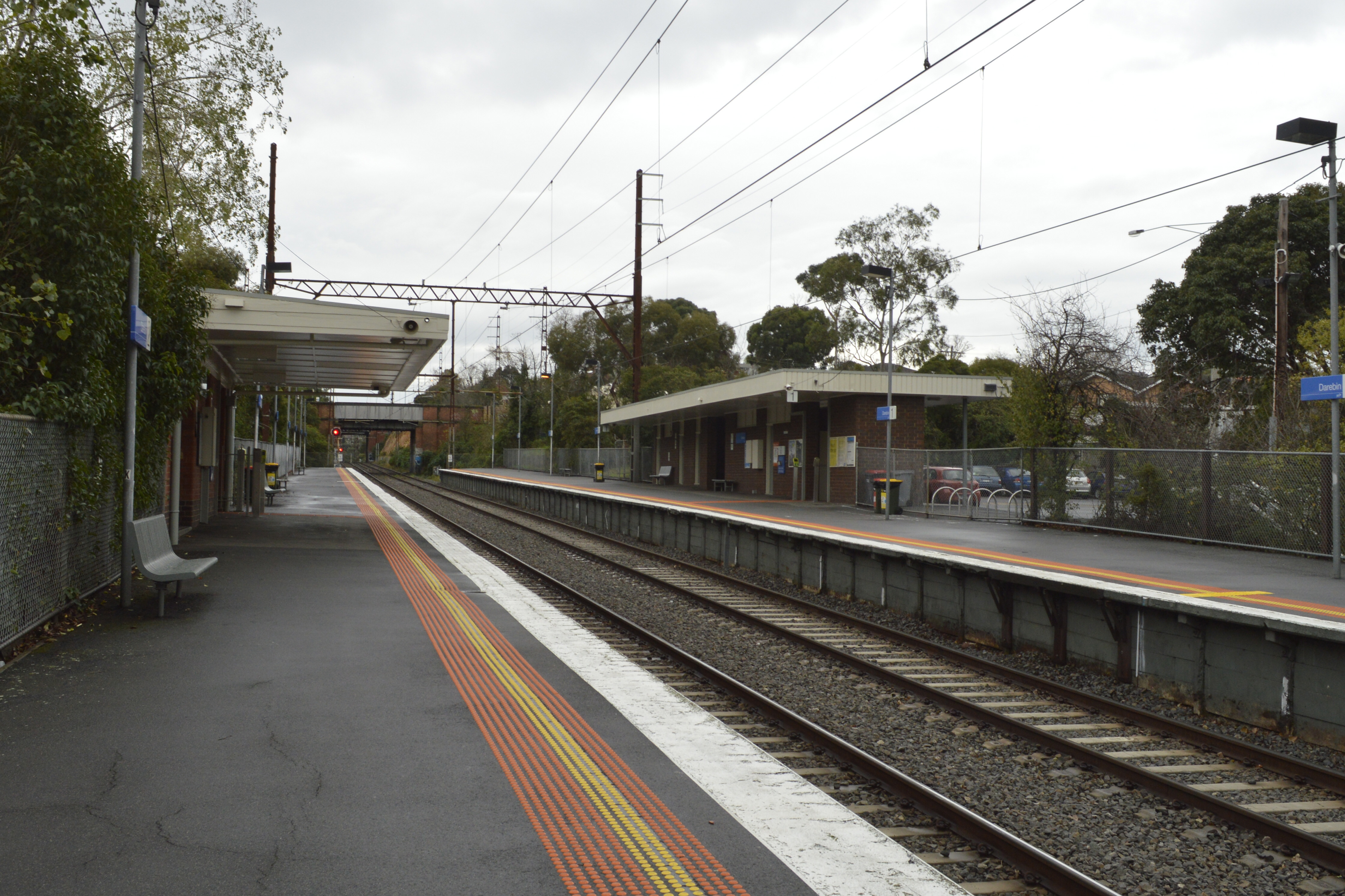
Darebin railway station

The 2012 Business Register states that Darebin currently has 11,575 businesses operating within the region. These businesses create 55,278 jobs for locals and residents of Melbourne, and the Darebin area itself has 74,291 employed residents. Darebin had a Gross Regional Product of A$5.23 billion in 2012, a 0.3% increase on the previous year. Since 2001, approximately A$1 billion of extra GRP has been created in the region. The biggest exports in Darebin are:

- Manufacturing ($1,072 million)
- Education & training ($313 million)
- Wholesale trade ($243 million)

Since 2006, gentrification in the Darebin area has seen average incomes and property values increase significantly in the region, particularly in the suburbs of Northcote, Fairfield, Alphington and Thornbury. As a result, there has been a dramatic change in the economy of Darebin and the types of businesses that operate. For example, since 2006, there has been increases in the total exports of the following industry sectors:

- Accommodation & food services – 49% increase ($39 million to $88.8 million)
- Wholesale trade – 39.4% increase ($203 million to $243 million)

Darebin also experienced growth thanks to the mining boom, with a 57% increase in mining-relating exports from 2006 to 2012, despite there being no mines in the municipality.

Of the 11,575 registered businesses in Darebin, the most common industry sectors are:

- Construction – 1,992 registered businesses (17.2%)
- Professional, scientific & technical services – 1,442 registered businesses (12.3%)
- Rental, hiring & real estate services – 1,167 registered businesses (10.1%)
- Transport, postal & warehousing – 1,031 registered businesses (8.9%)

== Demographics of Darebin ==
As of 2012, Darebin has 144,086 residents living in its boundaries which include 5,344 hectares or 53 km^{2}. This gives the area of Darebin a population density of 26.96 persons per hectare. Darebin residents have a median age of 36 and earn on average $1,178 per week. According to the 2011 Australian Bureau of Statistics census, in Darebin:

- 28% of households are couples with children. (4% lower than Victorian average)
- 34% live in Medium/High density housing (11% higher than Victorian average)
- 34% of residents rent their property (8% higher than Victorian average)
- 28% have a bachelor's degree or Higher (7% higher than Victorian average)
- 21% travel on Public Transport to work (10% higher than Victorian average)
- 29% from Non-English speaking backgrounds (9% higher than Victorian average)

The most common occupations in Darebin are:

- Professionals (28.7%)
- Clerical & Administrative Workers (14.7%)
- Technicians & Trade Workers (12.0%)

With gentrification, more educated and affluent residents are moving to the Darebin area, particularly in the suburbs of Northcote and Fairfield. This has seen a marked change in the occupations of residents in Darebin since 2006. There has been a decline in the number of residents employed in manual labour sectors and an increase in the number of residents employed in managerial, professional and community service sectors. This is also related to the number of residents living in Darebin with tertiary education, with a 6% increase in residents with degrees in the last 7 years. Furthermore, the largest increase in residents in Darebin came from those earning in the top 25%, with a 3.4% increase in these households since 2006.

Darebin has a diverse multicultural population, with 33.7% of residents being born overseas. The most common countries of birth are:

- Italy (5.3%)
- Greece (3.7%)
- India (3.3%)
- China (3.2%)

26% of Darebin residents also arrived in Australia within the last 5 years.

Darebin as a region is home to many environmentalists, and this, along with Darebin's proximity to the Melbourne CBD, is reflected in the transportation methods used by Darebin residents compared to Melbourne as a whole. Most residents still drive to work, with 50.1% of residents driving alone to work, however this is 10% lower than the Greater Melbourne average. Furthermore, 14.2% of Darebin residents travel to work by bus, compared to 11.9% in the rest of Melbourne. Darebin residents also walk to work, cycle to work or catch other modes of public transport more often than the rest of Melbourne. Since 2006, the largest single increase in transportation use has been in train travel, with 2,423 more residents catching the train, compared to 2,416 new vehicle drivers. This is the largest increase in Victoria.

== Arts and entertainment ==
Darebin City has an active artist community which is contemporary, experimental and culturally diverse. Writers, musicians and visual artists flock to the locality for performance, collaboration and acceptance. Notable contributors to the Darebin arts community are locals, Rose Turtle Ertler, Sundown and/or Last Stand, The Contrast, The Melbourne Ukulele Kollective, DIY art shows and house gigs collective, Loveanarchistpress Publishing, Performing Older Women's Circus (POW Circus) and TRAX Arts.

Darebin celebrates the artistry and diversity of the community with regular festivals and events such as the Darebin Music Feast and the High Vibes festival. The city also funds community music, such as the Preston Symphony Orchestra and public artwork, such as the Fairfield Industrial Dog Object.

The Preston Market is a central feature of Darebin and attracts people from all around the area.

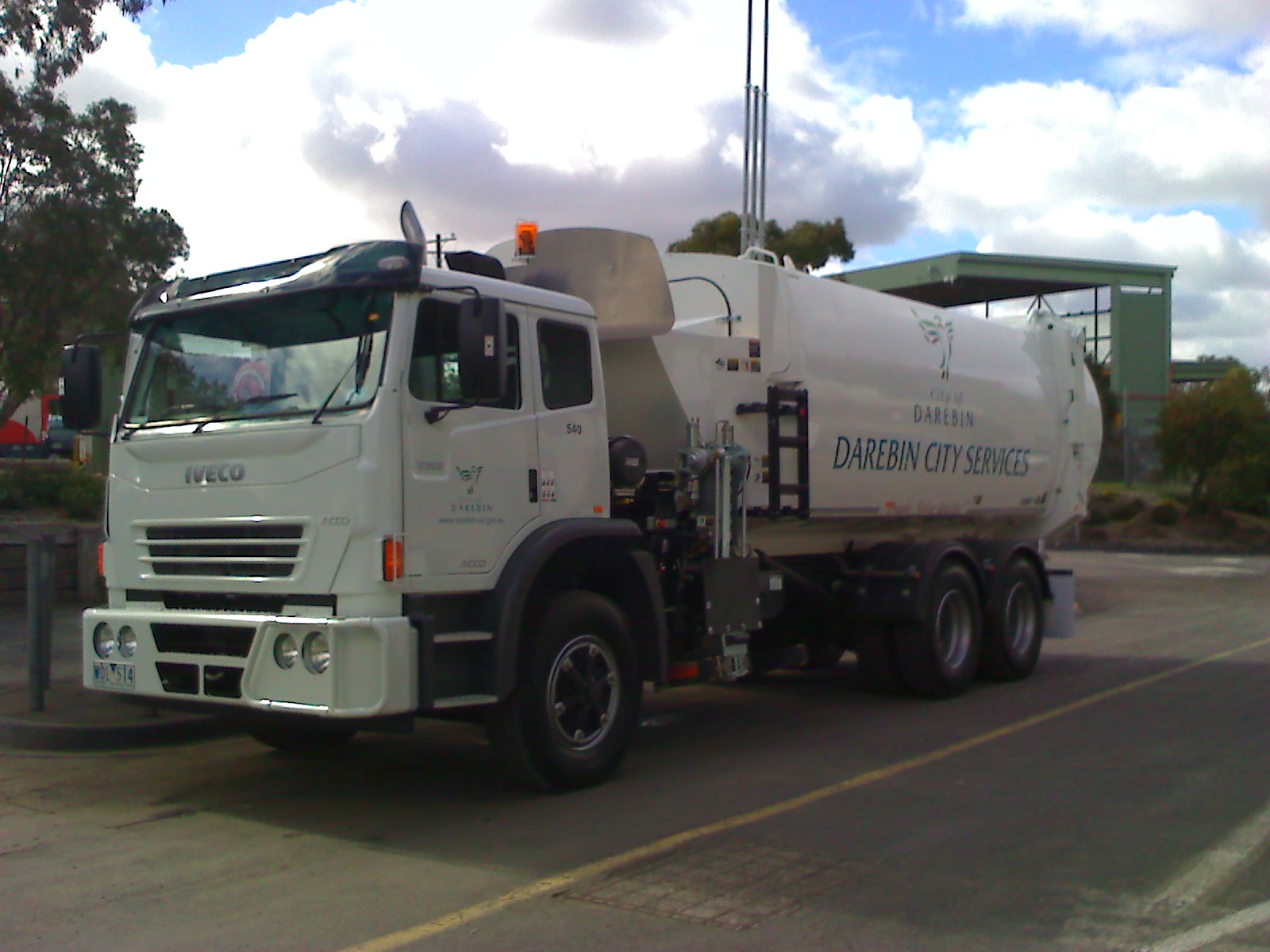
City of Darebin automated waste collection truck (2009)

== Controversies ==
=== Australia Day ===
In August 2017 the City of Darebin followed the City of Yarra Council in deciding not to celebrate Australia Day events. This was criticised by conservative commentators, with the Federal government subsequently removing the council's powers to hold citizenship ceremonies.

=== Same-sex marriage ===
In the lead-up to the Australian Marriage Law Postal Survey the council announced it would allow pro same-sex marriage campaigners to use its facilities and services (for free) and deny this access to those of an alternate view. This was criticised by conservative commentators but welcomed by community members.

The council subsequently reversed its plans to oppose those campaigning for the 'no' vote.

=== Men banned from applying for a council position ===
In September 2021, it was widely reported in the Australian media that the Darebin City Council had banned men from applying for a new position despite being an "equal opportunity employer".

=== 2022 state election ===
During the 2022 Victorian state election Labor took what they described as a 'Greens-dominated' Darebin council to court for removing Labor's billboards in the state seat of Northcote. Labor was able to obtain a court order that the council not interfere with Labor's campaign material.

== See also ==
- List of places on the Victorian Heritage Register in the City of Darebin
