= Results of the 2020 Victorian local elections =

← 2016	24 October 2020	2024 →

This is a list of results for the 2020 Victorian local elections.

== Results by LGA ==
- Results of the 2020 Victorian local elections in Barwon South West
- Results of the 2020 Victorian local elections in Eastern Melbourne
- Results of the 2020 Victorian local elections in Gippsland
- Results of the 2020 Victorian local elections in Grampians
- Results of the 2020 Victorian local elections in Hume
- Results of the 2020 Victorian local elections in Inner Melbourne
- Results of the 2020 Victorian local elections in Loddon Mallee
- Results of the 2020 Victorian local elections in Northern Melbourne
- Results of the 2020 Victorian local elections in South-Eastern Melbourne
- Results of the 2020 Victorian local elections in Western Melbourne

=== Individual LGAs ===
- 2020 Melbourne City Council election
