= Results of the 2024 Victorian local elections in Grampians =

2024 Victorian local elections (Grampians)
← 2020	October 2024	2028 →

This is a list of results for the 2024 Victorian local elections in the Grampians region.

The Grampians has a population of around 220,000 and covers 11 local government areas (LGAs), including the City of Ballarat.

== Ararat ==
2024 Ararat Rural City Council election
← 2020	October 2024	2028 →

All 7 seats on Ararat Rural City Council 4 seats needed for a majority
Largest party before election
Independents
Subsequent largest party
TBD

Ararat Rural City Council is composed of a single multi-member ward electing seven councillors.

=== Ararat results ===
2024 Victorian local elections: Ararat
Party	Candidate	Votes	%	±%
Independent National	Jo Armstrong (elected 1)	1,757	26.51	−11.98
Independent	Teli Kaur (elected 3)	743	11.21	
Independent	Bob Sanders (elected 2)	688	10.38	+0.22
Independent	Luke Matthew Preston (elected 5)	663	10.00	
Independent	Peter Joyce (elected 4)	592	8.93	
Independent	Amanda Mead	497	7.50	
Independent	Bill Waterston (elected 6)	486	7.33	−4.65
Independent	Rob Armstrong (elected 7)	343	5.18	+1.08
Independent	Daryl Scherger	286	4.32	
Independent	Osman Kokcu	258	3.89	
Independent	Peter Beales	180	2.72	−1.69
Victorian Socialists	Fiona Tipping	134	2.02	
Total formal votes		6,627	95.22	+0.68
Informal votes		333	4.78	−0.68
Turnout		6,960	83.54	−0.26

== Ballarat ==
2024 Ballarat City Council election
← 2020	October 2024	2028 →

All 9 seats on Ballarat City Council 5 seats needed for a majority
Largest party before election
No overall control
Subsequent largest party
No overall control

Ballarat City Council is composed of nine single-member wards. Prior to the 2024 election, it was composed of three multi-member wards with three members each, but the electoral structure has changed as a result of the Local Government Act 2020.

=== Ballarat results ===
2024 Victorian local elections: Ballarat
Party	Votes	%	Swing	Seats	Change
Independents	35,499	51.50	+21.93	4	▲1
Independent Liberal	15,177	22.02	−3.37	2	▼1
Independent Labor	9,955	14.44	−10.67	3	▲1
Greens	8,294	12.03	−4.91	0	▼1
Formal votes	68,925	97.10	−0.87		
Informal votes	2,057	2.90	+0.87		
Total	70,982	100.00		9	Steady
Registered voters / turnout	86,108	82.43	−0.18		

=== Alfredton ===
2024 Victorian local elections: Alfredton Ward
Party	Candidate	Votes	%	±%
Independent	Damon Saunders	3,281	37.26	
Independent Liberal	Nathan Anderson	1,691	19.20	
Independent	Elisa Zentveld	1,216	13.81	
Greens	Maegan Boundey	953	10.82	
Independent	Sundram Sivamalai	935	10.62	
Independent	Thomas Lam	727	8.26	
Total formal votes		8,803	97.65	
Informal votes		212	2.35	
Turnout		9,015	86.15	
Two-candidate-preferred result
Independent	Damon Saunders	5,338	60.64	
Independent Liberal	Nathan Anderson	3,465	39.36	
Independent win		(new ward)		

=== Brown Hill ===
2024 Victorian local elections: Brown Hill Ward
Party	Candidate	Votes	%	±%
Independent	Ted Lapkin	2,773	37.09	
Greens	Ellen Burns	2,395	32.04	
Independent Liberal	Amy Johnson	2,308	30.87	
Total formal votes		7,476	97.80	
Informal votes		168	2.20	
Turnout		7,644	82.72	
Two-candidate-preferred result
Independent	Ted Lapkin	3,787	50.66	
Greens	Ellen Burns	3,689	49.34	
Independent win		(new ward)		

=== Buninyong ===
2024 Victorian local elections: Buninyong Ward
Party	Candidate	Votes	%	±%
Independent Liberal	Ben Taylor	5,370	68.43	
Independent	Robert Pattie-Williams	1,553	19.79	
Independent	Mark Jones	925	11.79	
Total formal votes		7,848	97.19	
Informal votes		227	2.81	
Turnout		8,075	86.57	
Independent Liberal win		(new ward)		

=== Central ===
2024 Victorian local elections: Central Ward
Party	Candidate	Votes	%	±%
Greens	Belinda Coates	2,820	36.66	
Independent Liberal	Samantha McIntosh	2,793	36.31	
Independent	Duncan Smith	1,242	16.15	
Independent	John Stoneman	836	10.87	
Total formal votes		7,691	98.40	
Informal votes		125	1.60	
Turnout		7,816	82.60	
Two-candidate-preferred result
Independent Liberal	Samantha McIntosh	3,923	51.01	
Greens	Belinda Coates	3,768	48.99	
Independent Liberal win		(new ward)		

=== Delacombe ===
2024 Victorian local elections: Delacombe Ward
Party	Candidate	Votes	%	±%
Independent	Tracey Hargreaves	2,317	31.91	
Independent	Tom Madden	2,086	28.73	
Greens	Gab Salkowski	1,134	15.62	
Independent	Sebastian Borys	981	13.51	
Independent	Kalyan Velagala	742	10.22	
Total formal votes		7,260	96.92	
Informal votes		231	3.08	
Turnout		7,491	79.67	
Two-candidate-preferred result
Independent	Tracey Hargreaves	3,774	51.98	
Independent	Tom Madden	3,486	48.02	
Independent win		(new ward)		

=== Golden Point ===
2024 Victorian local elections: Golden Point Ward
Party	Candidate	Votes	%	±%
Independent Labor	Tess Morgan	2,716	39.24	
Independent	Mark Harris	1,197	17.29	
Greens	Adrik Wright	992	14.33	
Independent	Ray Borner	845	12.21	
Independent	Stephen Jones	520	7.51	
Independent	Dion Cartledge	232	3.35	
Independent	Phillip Lincoln Yordonopulo	223	3.22	
Independent	Josh Whittingham	197	2.85	
Total formal votes		6,922	96.55	
Informal votes		247	3.45	
Turnout		7,169	78.40	
After distribution of preferences
Independent Labor	Tess Morgan	3,567	51.53	
Independent	Mark Harris	2,004	28.95	
Greens	Adrik Wright	1,351	19.52	
Independent Labor win		(new ward)		

=== North ===
2024 Victorian local elections: North Ward
Party	Candidate	Votes	%	±%
Independent	Jim Rinaldi	2,932	35.58	
Independent	David Harris	2,217	26.90	
Independent	Glenn Rogers	1,603	19.45	
Independent	Rebecca McIntosh	1,488	18.06	
Total formal votes		8,240	97.26	
Informal votes		232	2.74	
Turnout		8,472	83.86	
Two-candidate-preferred result
Independent	Jim Rinaldi	4,246	51.53	
Independent	David Harris	3,994	48.47	
Independent win		(new ward)		

=== Sebastopol ===
2024 Victorian local elections: Sebastopol Ward
Party	Candidate	Votes	%	±%
Independent Labor	Des Hudson	4,307	60.79	
Independent	Colin Muir	2,778	39.21	
Total formal votes		7,085	94.33	
Informal votes		426	5.67	
Turnout		7,511	79.36	
Independent Labor win		(new ward)		

=== Wendouree ===
2024 Victorian local elections: Wendouree Ward
Party	Candidate	Votes	%	±%
Independent Liberal	Joshua Morris	3,019	39.77	
Independent Labor	Jay Morrison	2,932	38.62	
Independent	Kristen Justin	1,641	21.61	
Total formal votes		7,592	97.47	
Informal votes		197	2.53	
Turnout		7,789	82.01	
Two-candidate-preferred result
Independent Labor	Jay Morrison	3,855	50.78	
Independent Liberal	Joshua Morris	3,737	49.22	
Independent Labor win		(new ward)		

== Golden Plains ==
2024 Golden Plains Shire Council election
← 2020	October 2024	2028 →

All 7 seats on Golden Plains Shire Council 4 seats needed for a majority
Largest party before election
Independents
Subsequent largest party
Independents

Golden Plains Shire Council is composed of a single multi-member ward electing seven councillors.

=== Golden Plains results ===
2024 Victorian local elections: Golden Plains
Party	Candidate	Votes	%	±%
Independent	Lachlan Glen (elected 1)	2,932	18.90	
Independent	Sarah Hayden (elected 2)	2,297	14.81	
Independent	Des Phelan (elected 3)	2,148	13.85	
Independent	Brett Cunningham (elected 4)	1,524	9.82	−4.97
Independent	Owen Sharkey (elected 7)	1,475	9.51	−0.65
Independent	Helena Angela Kirby (elected 6)	1,423	9.17	+0.14
Independent	Emma Robbins (elected 5)	1,244	8.02	
Greens	Gavin Gamble	1,138	7.34	−2.01
Independent	John Crowe	800	5.16	
Independent	Dom Cook	533	3.44	
Total formal votes		15,514	95.13	+0.54
Informal votes		795	4.87	−0.54
Turnout		16,309	85.97	−0.66

== Hepburn ==
2024 Hepburn Shire Council election
← 2020	October 2024	2028 →

All 7 seats on Hepburn Shire Council 4 seats needed for a majority
Largest party before election
Independents
Subsequent largest party
Independents

Hepburn Shire Council is composed of one multi-member ward electing 7 members. Prior to the 2024 election, it was composed of five wards (three single-member and two two-member), but the electoral structure has changed as a result of the Local Government Act 2020.

=== Hepburn results ===
2024 Victorian local elections: Hepburn
Party	Candidate	Votes	%	±%
Independent	Don Henderson (elected 1)	2,440	23.48	
Independent	Brian Hood (elected 2)	1,540	14.82	
Independent	Lesley Hewitt (elected 3)	1,079	10.38	
Greens	Tim Drylie (elected 5)	963	9.27	
Independent	Pat Hockey (elected 6)	768	7.39	
Independent	Tony Clark (elected 4)	660	6.35	
Independent	Shirley Cornish (elected 7)	618	5.95	
Independent	Christian Porochowsky	537	5.17	
Independent	Derek Sedgman	492	4.73	
Independent	Cameron Stone	438	4.21	
Independent	Bernie Winfield-Gray	434	4.18	
Independent	Benny Pettersson	423	4.07	
Total formal votes		10,392	94.29	
Informal votes		629	5.71	
Turnout		11,021	83.30	

== Hindmarsh ==
2024 Hindmarsh Shire Council election
← 2020	October 2024	2028 →

All 6 seats on Hindmarsh Shire Council 4 seats needed for a majority
Largest party before election
Independents
Subsequent largest party
Independents

Hindmarsh Shire Council is composed of three multi-member wards with two members each.

=== Hindmarsh results ===
2024 Victorian local elections: Hindmarsh
Party	Votes	%	Swing	Seats	Change
Independent	2,249	100.00		6	Steady
Formal votes	2,249	97.66			
Informal votes	54	2.34			
Total	2,303	100.00		6	Steady
Registered voters / turnout	4,317				

=== East ===
2024 Victorian local elections: East Ward
Party	Candidate	Votes	%	±%
Independent	Chan Uoy (elected 1)	641	53.73	
Independent	James Barry (elected 2)	311	26.07	
Independent	Debra Nelson	241	20.20	
Total formal votes		1,193	99.00	
Informal votes		12	1.00	
Turnout		1,205	83.74	

=== North ===
2024 Victorian local elections: North Ward
Party	Candidate	Votes	%	±%
Independent	Tony Clark (elected 1)	430	40.72	
Independent	Roger Aitken (elected 2)	388	36.74	
Independent	Elizabeth Chivell	238	22.54	
Total formal votes		1,056	96.17	−2.57
Informal votes		42	3.83	+2.57
Turnout		1,098	84.98	−1.60

=== West ===
2024 Victorian local elections: West Ward
Party	Candidate	Votes	%	±%
Independent	Rosie Barker (elected)	unopposed		
Independent	Ron Ismay (elected)	unopposed		
Registered electors		1,586		

== Horsham ==
2024 Horsham Rural City Council election
← 2020	October 2024	2028 →

All 7 seats on Horsham Rural City Council 4 seats needed for a majority
Largest party before election
Independents
Subsequent largest party
Independents

Horsham Rural City Council is composed of seven single-member wards. Prior to the 2024 election, it was composed of a single multi-member ward with seven members, but the electoral structure has changed as a result of the Local Government Act 2020.

=== Horsham results ===
2024 Victorian local elections: Horsham
Party	Votes	%	Seats	Change
Independents	8,706	100.00	7	Steady
Formal votes	8,706	96.80		
Informal votes	288	3.20		
Total	8,994	100.00	7	Steady
Registered voters	15,317			

=== Green Park ===
2024 Victorian local elections: Green Park Ward
Party	Candidate	Votes	%	±%
Independent	Dean O'Loughlin	1,309	68.25	
Independent	Brian R. Basham	609	31.75	
Total formal votes		1,918	96.09	
Informal votes		78	3.91	
Turnout		1,996	88.05	
Independent win		(new ward)		

=== Horsham North ===
2024 Victorian local elections: Horsham North Ward
Party	Candidate	Votes	%	±%
Independent	Todd C. Wilson	700	40.16	
Independent	Kathy Ross	529	30.35	
Independent	Claudia Haenel	514	29.49	
Total formal votes		1,743	98.03	
Informal votes		35	1.97	
Turnout		1,778	78.36	
Two-candidate-preferred result
Independent	Todd C. Wilson	966	55.42	
Independent	Kathy Ross	777	44.58	
Independent win		(new ward)		

=== Kalimna ===
2024 Victorian local elections: Kalimna Ward
Party	Candidate	Votes	%	±%
Independent	Rebecca Sluggett	unopposed		
Registered electors		2,369		
Independent win		(new ward)		

=== May Park ===
2024 Victorian local elections: May Park Ward
Party	Candidate	Votes	%	±%
Independent	Cam McDonald	1,185	72.88	
Independent	Les Power	441	27.12	
Total formal votes		1,626	95.59	
Informal votes		75	4.41	
Turnout		1,701	80.96	
Independent win		(new ward)		

=== Oatlands ===
2024 Victorian local elections: Oatlands Ward
Party	Candidate	Votes	%	±%
Independent	Angela Munn	788	47.73	
Independent	Dylan Hesselberg	605	36.64	
Independent	David Bowe	258	15.63	
Total formal votes		1,651	96.72	
Informal votes		56	3.28	
Turnout		1,707	79.80	
Two-candidate-preferred result
Independent	Angela Munn	930	56.33	
Independent	Dylan Hesselberg	721	43.67	
Independent win		(new ward)		

=== Pine Lake ===
2024 Victorian local elections: Pine Lake Ward
Party	Candidate	Votes	%	±%
Independent	Ian Ross	1,114	63.04	
Independent	Toby Haynes	358	20.26	
Independent	Michael Bond	295	16.69	
Total formal votes		1,767	97.52	
Informal votes		45	2.48	
Turnout		1,812	88.09	
Independent win		(new ward)		

=== Wyn Wyn ===
2024 Victorian local elections: Wyn Wyn Ward
Party	Candidate	Votes	%	±%
Independent	Brian Klowss	unopposed		
Registered electors		2,115		
Independent win		(new ward)		

== Moorabool ==
2024 Moorabool Shire Council election
← 2020	October 2024	2028 →

All 9 seats on Moorabool Shire Council 5 seats needed for a majority
Largest party before election
Independents
Subsequent largest party
Independents

Moorabool Shire Council is composed of one multi-member ward electing nine members. Prior to the 2024 election, it was composed of four wards (three single-member and one four-member), but the electoral structure has changed as a result of the Local Government Act 2020.

=== Moorabool results ===
2024 Victorian local elections: Moorabool
Party	Candidate	Votes	%	±%
Independent Liberal	Paul Tatchell (elected 1)	2,815	13.04	
Independent	Ally Munari (elected 2)	2,317	10.73	
Independent Liberal	Jarrod James Bingham (elected 3)	2,006	9.29	
Independent	Steven Venditti Taylor (elected 4)	1,897	8.79	
Independent	Rodney Ward (elected 5)	1,893	8.77	
Independent	Moira Berry (elected 6)	1,813	8.40	
Independent	John Keogh (elected 8)	1,737	8.05	
Independent	Tom Sullivan (elected 7)	1,577	7.31	
Independent	Sheila Freeman (elected 9)	1,131	5.24	
Independent	Timothy Bell	1,066	4.94	
Independent	Helen Tatchell	938	4.35	
Independent	Michael Ray	904	4.19	
Animal Justice	Tim Hawthorne	636	2.95	
Independent	Ilona Kucera	508	2.35	
Independent	Karellyn Dangar	348	1.61	
Total formal votes		21,586	93.17	
Informal votes		1,582	6.83	
Turnout		23,168	83.63	

== Northern Grampians ==
2024 Northern Grampians Shire Council election
← 2020	October 2024	2028 →

All 6 seats on Northern Grampians Shire Council 4 seats needed for a majority
Largest party before election
Independents
Subsequent largest party
Independents

Northern Grampians Shire Council is composed of three multi-member wards with two members each. The council decreased from seven members to six prior to the 2024 election; members were previously elected across four wards (two single-member, one two-member and one three-member).

=== Northern Grampians results ===
2024 Victorian local elections: Northern Grampians
Party	Votes	%	Seats	Change
Independent	7,061	93.56	6	Steady
Independent National	486	6.44	0	▼1
Formal votes	7,547	97.51		
Informal votes	193	2.49		
Total	7,740	100.00	6	▼1
Registered voters / turnout	9,150	84.59		

=== Central ===
2024 Victorian local elections: Central Ward
Party	Candidate	Votes	%	±%
Independent	Karen Hyslop (elected 1)	596	22.07	
Independent	Jenny Greenberger (elected 2)	539	19.96	
Independent National	Kevin Erwin	486	17.99	
Independent	Lauren Dempsey	483	17.88	
Independent	Lachlan Eckert	396	14.66	
Independent	Rob Haswell	201	7.44	
Total formal votes		2,701	96.95	
Informal votes		85	3.05	
Turnout		2,786	84.45	

=== Grampians ===
2024 Victorian local elections: Grampians Ward
Party	Candidate	Votes	%	±%
Independent	Justine Hide (elected 1)	662	27.05	
Independent	Jack Blake (elected 2)	659	26.93	
Independent	Trevor Gready	640	26.15	
Independent	Lisa Whyte	486	19.86	
Total formal votes		2,447	98.00	
Informal votes		50	2.00	
Turnout		2,497	84.53	

=== Kara Kara ===
2024 Victorian local elections: Kara Kara Ward
Party	Candidate	Votes	%	±%
Independent	Karen Probst (elected 1)	1,432	59.69	
Independent	Murray Emerson (elected 2)	378	15.76	
Independent	Terence Robertson	205	8.55	
Independent	Ross Hudson	202	8.42	
Independent	John Farrell	182	7.59	
Total formal votes		2,399	97.64	
Informal votes		58	2.36	
Turnout		2,457	84.81	

== Pyrenees ==
2024 Pyrenees Shire Council election
← 2020	October 2024	2028 →

All 5 seats on Pyrenees Shire Council 3 seats needed for a majority
Largest party before election
Independents
Subsequent largest party
Independents

Pyrenees Shire Council is composed of five single-member wards.

=== Pyrenees results ===
2024 Victorian local elections: Pyrenees
Party	Votes	%	Swing	Seats	Change
Independents	5,043	100.00		5	Steady
Formal votes	5,043	96.31			
Informal votes	193	3.69			
Total	5,236	100.00		5	Steady
Registered voters / turnout	6,137	85.32			

=== Avoca ===
2024 Victorian local elections: Avoca Ward
Party	Candidate	Votes	%	±%
Independent	Rebecca Wardlaw	818	76.23	
Independent	Ronald Brendon Eason	255	23.77	−36.51
Total formal votes		1,073	96.75	+0.25
Informal votes		36	3.25	−0.25
Turnout		1,109	86.10	+2.36
Independent gain from Independent				

=== Beaufort ===
2024 Victorian local elections: Beaufort Ward
Party	Candidate	Votes	%	±%
Independent	Damian Hugh Ferrari	567	54.52	
Independent	Paul Callanan	473	45.48	
Total formal votes		1,040	95.85	
Informal votes		45	4.15	
Turnout		1,085	82.64	
Independent hold				

=== De Cameron ===
2024 Victorian local elections: De Cameron Ward
Party	Candidate	Votes	%	±%
Independent	Kate Tol	347	35.48	
Independent	Megan Phelan	335	34.25	
Independent	Fiona Williamson	229	23.42	
Independent	Rose La Vie	67	6.85	
Total formal votes		978	97.41	
Informal votes		26	2.59	
Turnout		1,004	85.67	
Two-candidate-preferred result
Independent	Megan Phelan	505	51.64	
Independent	Kate Tol	473	48.36	
Independent gain from Independent				

=== Ercildoune ===
2024 Victorian local elections: Ercildoune Ward
Party	Candidate	Votes	%	±%
Independent	Simon Tol	516	53.47	+8.69
Independent	David Clark	449	46.53	−8.69
Total formal votes		965	94.61	−2.51
Informal votes		55	5.39	+2.51
Turnout		1,020	87.63	+3.99
Independent gain from Independent		Swing	+8.69	

=== Mount Emu ===
2024 Victorian local elections: Mount Emu Ward
Party	Candidate	Votes	%	±%
Independent	Tanya Kehoe	563	57.16	
Independent	Dan Ferguson	422	42.84	
Total formal votes		985	96.76	
Informal votes		33	3.24	
Turnout		1,018	84.83	
Independent hold				

== West Wimmera ==
2024 West Wimmera Shire Council election
← 2020	October 2024	2028 →

All 5 seats on West Wimmera Shire Council 3 seats needed for a majority
Largest party before election
Independents
Subsequent largest party
Independents

West Wimmera Shire Council is composed of a single multi-member ward electing five councillors.

=== West Wimmera results ===
2024 Victorian local elections: West Wimmera
Party	Candidate	Votes	%	±%
Independent	Helen Hobbs (elected 1)	664	26.16	
Independent	Tim Meyer (elected 2)	547	21.55	+7.87
Independent	Jodie Pretlove (elected 3)	535	21.08	−11.84
Independent	Tom Houlihan (elected 5)	312	12.29	−2.01
Independent	Richard William Hicks (elected 4)	295	11.62	+5.27
Independent	Bruce H. Meyer	185	7.29	
Total formal votes		2,538	98.18	−0.12
Informal votes		47	1.82	+0.12
Turnout		2,585	85.68	+4.66

== Yarriambiack ==
2024 Yarriambiack Shire Council election
← 2020	October 2024	2028 →

All 6 seats on Yarriambiack Shire Council 4 seats needed for a majority
Largest party before election
Independents
Subsequent largest party
Independents

Yarriambiack Shire Council is composed of three multi-member wards with two members each. The council decreased from seven members to six prior to the 2024 election; members were previously elected across two two-member wards and one three-member ward.

Since only two candidates nominated to run in each ward, all six members for Yarriambiack Shire Council were elected unopposed.

=== Yarriambiack results ===
2024 Victorian local elections: Yarriambiack
Party	Votes	%	Seats	Change
Independents	N/A	N/A	6	▼1
Registered voters	5,170			

=== Dunmunkle ===
2024 Victorian local elections: Dunmunkle Ward
Party	Candidate	Votes	%	±%
Independent	Melinda Keel (elected)	unopposed		
Independent	Corinne Heintze (elected)	unopposed		
Registered electors		1,767		

=== Hopetoun ===
2024 Victorian local elections: Hopetoun Ward
Party	Candidate	Votes	%	±%
Independent	Andrew McLean (elected)	unopposed		
Independent	Chris K. Lehmann (elected)	unopposed		
Registered electors		1,637		

=== Warracknabeal ===
2024 Victorian local elections: Warracknabeal Ward
Party	Candidate	Votes	%	±%
Independent	Karly Kirk (elected)	unopposed		
Independent	Kylie Zanker (elected)	unopposed		
Registered electors		1,766		
