= Results of the 2024 Victorian local elections in Eastern Melbourne =

2024 Victorian local elections (Eastern Melbourne)
- October 2024

This is a list of results for the 2024 Victorian local elections in the Eastern Melbourne region.

Eastern Melbourne covers the local government areas (LGAs) of Boroondara, Knox, Manningham, Maroondah, Monash, Whitehorse and Yarra Ranges.

== Boroondara ==
2024 Boroondara City Council election
- October 2024

All 11 seats on Boroondara City Council 6 seats needed for a majority
- Registered: 117,377
- Turnout: 84.14%
	First party	Second party	Third party
	IND	IND
Party	Independent	Ind. Liberal	Greens
Last election	5 seats	5 seats	1 seat
Seats before	7	3	1
Seats won	8	1	2
Seat change	▲1	▼2	▲1
First preference vote	55,852	27,946	8,155
Percentage	57.70%	28.87%	8.42%
Swing	▲0.34	▼3.73 (Note: Compared to the combined Independent Liberal and Burwood Liberals result at the 2020 election.)	▲2.99
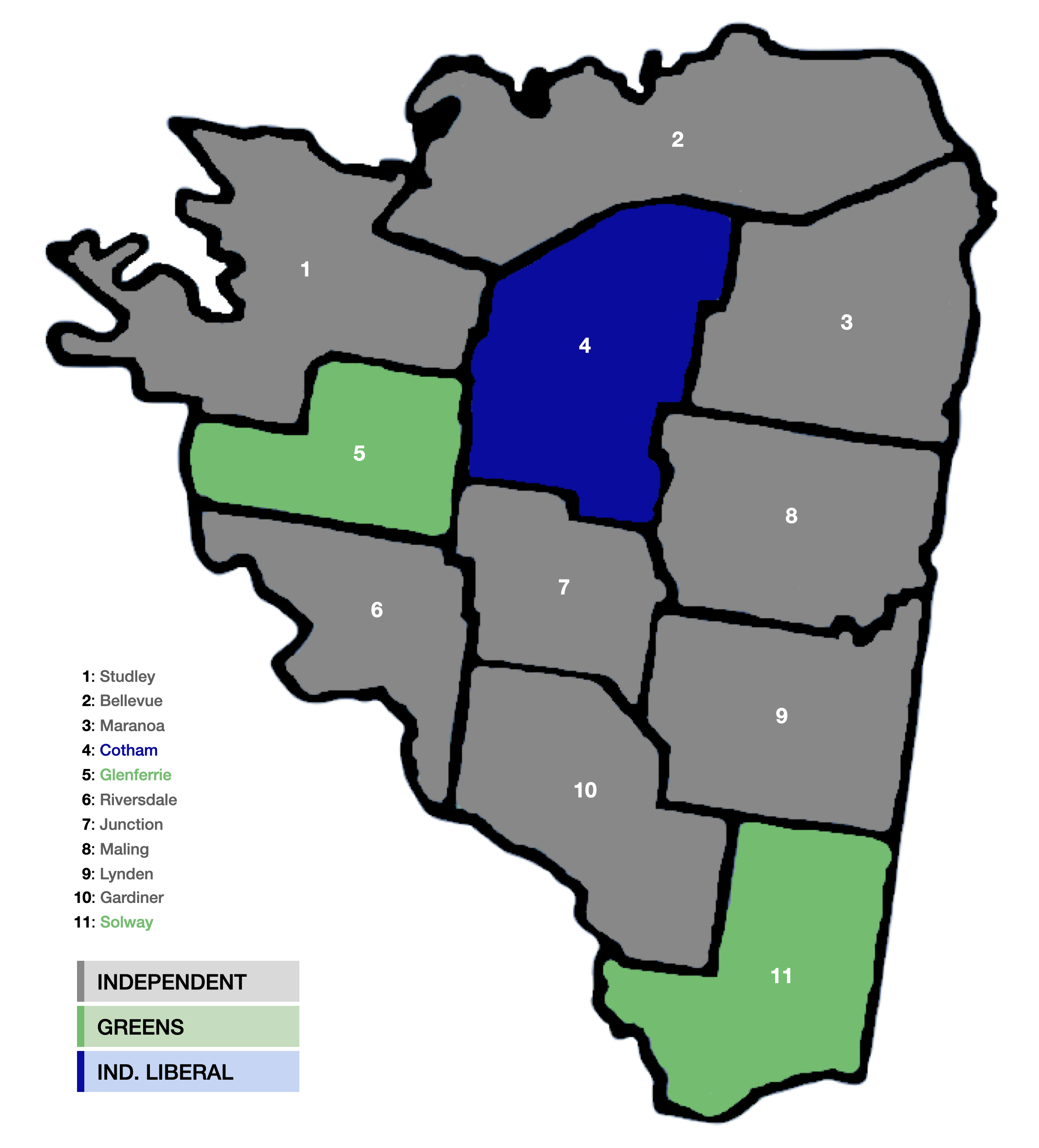
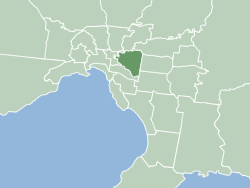
Largest party before election
Independents
Subsequent largest party
Independents

Boroondara City Council is composed of 11 single-member wards.

Independent councillors Jim Parke (Bellevue), Susan Biggar (Riversdale) and Garry Thompson (Solway) did not seek re-election. Thompson, along with Lisa Hollingsworth (Lynden), resigned from the Liberal Party in 2021.

=== Boroondara results ===
2024 Victorian local elections: Boroondara
Party	Votes	%	Swing	Seats	Change
Independents	55,852	57.70	+0.34	8	▲3
Independent Liberal	27,946	28.87	–3.73	1	▼4
Greens	8,155	8.42	+2.99	2	▲1
Independent Labor	3,323	3.43	+1.75	0	Steady
Victorian Socialists	1,523	1.57	+1.57	0	Steady
Formal votes	96,799	98.01	+0.16		
Informal votes	1,962	1.99	–0.16		
Total	98,761	100.00		11	
Registered voters / turnout	117,377	84.14			

=== Bellevue ===
2024 Victorian local elections: Bellevue Ward
Party	Candidate	Votes	%	±%
Independent	Michael Nolan	4,062	44.30	+44.30
Independent Liberal	Serena Huang	3,198	34.97	+34.97
Independent	Gregory Ball	1,061	11.57	+11.57
Victorian Socialists	Samuel Allan	486	5.30	+5.30
Independent	David Dawson	363	3.96	+3.96
Total formal votes		9,170	98.19	+0.03
Informal votes		169	1.81	–0.03
Turnout		9,339	85.62	–1.80
Two-candidate-preferred result
Independent	Michael Nolan	5,291	57.70	+57.70
Independent Liberal	Serena Huang	3,879	42.30	+42.30
Independent gain from Independent		Swing	N/A	

=== Cotham ===
2024 Victorian local elections: Cotham Ward
Party	Candidate	Votes	%	±%
Independent Liberal	Felicity Sinfield	5,765	63.44	+14.34
Independent Labor	Liz Kelly	3,323	36.56	+36.56
Total formal votes		9,088	96.92	−1.06
Informal votes		289	3.08	+1.06
Turnout		9,377	85.19	−1.80
Independent Liberal hold		Swing	+5.86	

=== Gardiner ===
2024 Victorian local elections: Gardiner Ward
Party	Candidate	Votes	%	±%
Independent	Victor Franco	5,132	53.55	+17.36
Independent Liberal	David Chu	3,139	32.76	+32.76
Independent Liberal	Michael Burge	1,312	13.69	+13.69
Total formal votes		9,583	97.84	–0.18
Informal votes		212	2.16	+0.18
Turnout		9,795	85.63	–0.47
Independent hold				

=== Glenferrie ===
2024 Victorian local elections: Glenferrie Ward
Party	Candidate	Votes	%	±%
Greens	Wes Gault	4,103	53.18	+22.04
Independent	Sam Aldemir	2,184	28.31	+28.31
Independent Liberal	Rochelle Pattison	1,428	18.51	+18.51
Total formal votes		7,715	98.51	+0.98
Informal votes		117	1.49	–0.98
Turnout		7,832	79.10	+2.03
Greens hold		Swing	+22.04	

=== Junction ===
2024 Victorian local elections: Junction Ward
Party	Candidate	Votes	%	±%
Independent	Mal Osborne-Smith	4,114	53.43	+53.43
Independent	Di Gillies	3,586	46.57	–5.48
Total formal votes		7,700	96.89	–1.32
Informal votes		247	3.11	+1.32
Turnout		7,947	81.66	+2.56
Independent gain from Independent		Swing	N/A	

=== Lynden ===
2024 Victorian local elections: Lynden Ward
Party	Candidate	Votes	%	±%
Independent	Lisa Hollingsworth	5,117	54.92	–1.44
Independent Liberal	Michael Lamb	3,164	33.96	+33.96
Victorian Socialists	Colton Senior	1,037	11.15	+11.15
Total formal votes		9,318	98.22	+0.11
Informal votes		169	1.78	–0.11
Turnout		9,487	86.29	–0.66
Councillor changed to Independent from Burwood Liberals		Swing	–1.44	

=== Maling ===
2024 Victorian local elections: Maling Ward
Party	Candidate	Votes	%	±%
Independent	Shima Ibuki	3,598	39.41	+39.41
Independent Liberal	Anthony Nicholls	2,319	25.40	+25.40
Independent	Jane Addis	2,232	24.45	–10.99
Independent Liberal	Sam Wan	981	10.74	+10.74
Total formal votes		9,130	98.47	+0.74
Informal votes		142	1.53	–0.74
Turnout		9,272	85.98	–1.61
Two-candidate-preferred result
Independent	Shima Ibuki	5,037	55.17	+55.17
Independent Liberal	Anthony Nicholls	4,093	44.83	+44.83
Independent gain from Independent		Swing	N/A	

=== Maranoa ===
2024 Victorian local elections: Maranoa Ward
Party	Candidate	Votes	%	±%
Independent	Chris Pattas	3,627	40.37	+26.88
Independent Liberal	Cynthia Watson	2,034	22.64	–13.27
Independent	Peter Campbell	2,025	22.54	+22.54
Greens	Jackie Carter	1,298	14.45	+14.45
Total formal votes		8,984	98.14	+0.87
Informal votes		170	1.86	–0.87
Turnout		9,154	85.42	–1.13
Two-candidate-preferred result
Independent	Chris Pattas	5,425	60.39	+60.39
Independent	Peter Campbell	3,559	39.61	+39.61
Independent gain from Independent Liberal		Swing	N/A	

=== Riversdale ===
2024 Victorian local elections: Riversdale Ward
Party	Candidate	Votes	%	±%
Independent	Rob Baillieu	3,769	47.07	+30.62
Independent	Wayne Kelly	2,121	26.49	+26.49
Independent	Priscilla Duncan	2,117	26.44	+26.44
Total formal votes		8,007	98.37	+0.79
Informal votes		133	1.63	–0.79
Turnout		8,140	78.69	–0.63
Two-candidate-preferred result
Independent	Rob Baillieu	4,676	58.40	+58.40
Independent	Wayne Kelly	3,331	41.60	+41.60
Independent gain from Independent		Swing	N/A	

=== Solway ===
2024 Victorian local elections: Solway Ward
Party	Candidate	Votes	%	±%
Greens	John Friend-Pereira	2,754	29.27	+29.27
Independent	Kate Bellamy	2,496	26.52	+26.52
Independent Liberal	Zachary Townend	2,411	25.62	
Independent	Adrian Morgan	1,000	10.63	+10.63
Independent	Atul Kalra	749	7.96	+7.96
Total formal votes		9,410	98.06	+0.03
Informal votes		186	1.94	–0.03
Turnout		9,596	86.62	–1.49
Two-candidate-preferred result
Greens	John Friend-Pereira	4,970	52.82	+52.82
Independent Liberal	Zachary Townend	4,440	47.18	+47.18
Greens gain from Independent		Swing	N/A	

=== Studley ===
2024 Victorian local elections: Studley Ward
Party	Candidate	Votes	%	±%
Independent	Sophie Torney	3,853	44.32	+44.32
Independent Liberal	Nick Stavrou	2,195	25.25	+8.46
Independent	Kym Sullivan	1,385	15.93	+6.67
Independent	Amanda Towe	1,261	14.50	+14.50
Total formal votes		8,694	98.33	+0.64
Informal votes		148	1.67	–0.64
Turnout		8,842	81.51	–1.58
After distribution of preferences
Independent	Sophie Torney	4,471	51.43	+51.43
Independent Liberal	Nick Stavrou	2,541	29.23	–21.73
Independent	Kym Sullivan	1,682	19.35	+19.35
Independent gain from Independent Liberal		Swing	N/A	

== Knox ==
2024 Knox City Council election
- 26 October 2024

All 9 seats on Knox City Council 5 seats needed for a majority
- 2016, 2020 and 2024 ward boundaries. Expand the map and click on a ward to see the ward name
Largest party before election
Independents
Subsequent largest party
Independents

Knox City Council is composed of nine single-member wards. Independent councillors Jude Dwight (Chandler), Nicole Seymour (Tirhatuan) and Marcia Timmers-Leitch (Collier), as well as Independent Liberal councillor Darren Pearce (Taylor), did not seek re-election.

=== Knox results ===
2024 Victorian local elections: Knox
Party	Votes	%	Swing	Seats	Change
Independent	62,340	67.69		6	▼1
Independent Liberal	18,863	20.48		2	▲1
Independent Labor	10,114	10.98		1	Steady
Animal Justice	784	0.85		0	Steady
Formal votes	92,101	96.93			
Informal votes	2,921	3.07			
Total	95,022	100.00		9	Steady
Registered voters / turnout	111,492	85.23			

=== Baird ===
2024 Victorian local elections: Baird Ward
Party	Candidate	Votes	%	±%
Independent Labor	Peter Lockwood	3,612	35.88	+6.16
Independent	Yvonne Allred	2,946	29.26	−12.91
Independent	Gary Saultry	1,524	15.14	+15.14
Independent Labor	Andrew Church	1,201	11.93	+11.93 (Note: If compared to his results in Scott Ward at the 2020 election, Andrew Church had a swing of 2.40% against him.)
Animal Justice	Samantha Gilchrist	784	7.79	+7.79
Total formal votes		10,067	97.12	−0.14
Informal votes		299	2.88	+0.14
Turnout		10,366	83.32	+2.34
Two-candidate-preferred result
Independent Labor	Peter Lockwood	5,222	51.87	+13.42
Independent	Yvonne Allred	4,845	48.13	−13.42
Independent Labor gain from Independent		Swing	+13.42	

- On 13 November 2024, the Victorian Electoral Commission applied to the Victorian Civil and Administrative Tribunal (VCAT) for a review of the results in Baird Ward after a high number of multiple returns (referring to when more than one ballot pack is returned by a voter) were detected. On 5 June 2025, VCAT upheld the election result, finding there was attempted and actual interference, but it did not affect the result of the election.

=== Chandler ===
2024 Victorian local elections: Chandler Ward
Party	Candidate	Votes	%	±%
Independent	Paige Kennett	3,286	34.85	+34.85
Independent Liberal	Jeff Kidney	2,502	26.54	+26.54
Independent Labor	Matt Harris	2,462	26.11	+26.11
Independent	Ryan Bruce	1,179	12.50	+12.50
Total formal votes		9,429	96.94	−0.33
Informal votes		298	3.06	+0.33
Turnout		9,727	83.45	+1.29
Two-candidate-preferred result
Independent	Paige Kennett	4,957	52.57	+52.57
Independent Liberal	Jeff Kidney	4,472	47.43	+47.43
Independent gain from Independent				

=== Collier ===
2024 Victorian local elections: Collier Ward
Party	Candidate	Votes	%	±%
Independent	Chris Duncan	4,556	45.81	+45.81 (Note: If compared to his results in Baird Ward at the 2020 election, Chris Duncan had a swing of 17.70% towards him.)
Independent Liberal	Emily Sun	3,304	33.22	+33.22
Independent	Aidan Griffiths	1,111	11.17	+11.17
Independent	Jesse Elderhorst	975	9.80	+9.80
Total formal votes		9,946	97.67	+97.67
Informal votes		237	2.33	+2.33
Turnout		10,183	86.38	+86.38
Two-candidate-preferred result
Independent	Chris Duncan	5,674	57.05	+57.05
Independent Liberal	Emily Sun	4,272	42.95	+42.95
Independent gain from Independent				

=== Dinsdale ===
2024 Victorian local elections: Dinsdale Ward
Party	Candidate	Votes	%	±%
Independent Liberal	Robert Williams	3,777	39.52	+2.24
Independent Labor	Sorina Grasso	2,839	29.70	−1.98
Independent	Gary Leech	2,012	21.05	+21.05
Independent	Sitha Devarapalli	930	9.73	+9.73
Total formal votes		9,558	97.78	+0.26
Informal votes		217	2.22	−0.26
Turnout		9,775	82.62	+0.61
Two-candidate-preferred result
Independent Liberal	Robert Williams	5,146	53.84	+4.33
Independent Labor	Sorina Grasso	4,412	46.16	−4.33
Independent Liberal gain from Independent Labor		Swing	+4.33	

=== Dobson ===
2024 Victorian local elections: Dobson Ward
Party	Candidate	Votes	%	±%
Independent	Meagan Baker	3,292	29.33	−25.12
Independent Liberal	Tony Holland	3,069	27.34	+27.34 (Note: If compared to his results in Friberg Ward at the 2020 election, Tony Holland had a swing of 5.76% against him.)
Independent	Joe Stroud	2,870	25.57	+25.57
Independent	Emily Cox	1,993	17.76	+17.76
Total formal votes		11,224	97.29	+0.69
Informal votes		313	2.71	−0.69
Turnout		11,537	85.50	+0.48
Two-candidate-preferred result
Independent	Meagan Baker	5,773	51.43	+51.43
Independent	Joe Stroud	5,451	48.57	+48.57
Independent hold				

=== Friberg ===
2024 Victorian local elections: Friberg Ward
Party	Candidate	Votes	%	±%
Independent Liberal	Parisa Considine	6,211	55.93	+55.93
Independent	Susan Laukens	4,893	44.07	−4.70
Total formal votes		11,104	96.04	−1.70
Informal votes		458	3.96	+1.70
Turnout		11,562	85.13	−0.79
Independent Liberal gain from Independent				

=== Scott ===
2024 Victorian local elections: Scott Ward
Party	Candidate	Votes	%	±%
Independent	Lisa Cooper	6,735	67.48	+11.79
Independent	Lily Wu	3,245	32.52	+32.52
Total formal votes		9,980	95.96	−1.90
Informal votes		420	4.04	+1.90
Turnout		10,400	86.59	+0.42
Independent hold				

=== Taylor ===
2024 Victorian local elections: Taylor Ward
Party	Candidate	Votes	%	±%
Independent	Susan Pearce	7,124	63.89	+21.01 (Note: Changes compared with the result of Darren Pearce (the husband of Susan Pearce) at the 2020 election. Darren Pearce is a member of the Liberal Party and had contested as an Independent Liberal, while Susan Pearce is a former Liberal member.)
Independent	Robert Mason	4,026	36.11	+36.11
Total formal votes		11,150	96.25	−1.49
Informal votes		435	3.75	+1.49
Turnout		11,585	87.35	+0.14
Independent gain from Independent Liberal				

=== Tirhatuan ===
2024 Victorian local elections: Tirhatuan Ward
Party	Candidate	Votes	%	±%
Independent	Glen Atwell	5,881	60.99	+60.99
Independent	Andrew Williams	3,067	31.81	+31.81
Independent	Segar Nadarajah	695	7.21	+7.21
Total formal votes		9,643	97.53	−0.05
Informal votes		244	2.47	+0.05
Turnout		9,887	86.55	+1.37
Independent gain from Independent				

== Manningham ==
2024 Manningham City Council election
- October 2024

All 9 seats on Manningham City Council 5 seats needed for a majority
- 2020 and 2024 ward boundaries. Expand the map and click on a ward to see the ward name
Largest party before election
No overall control
Subsequent largest party
Independent Liberal

Manningham City Council is composed of nine single-member wards.

=== Manningham results ===
2024 Victorian local elections: Manningham
Party	Votes	%	Swing	Seats	Change
Independent	27,962	51.63		4	Steady
Independent Liberal	19,274	35.59		5	▲1
Greens	3,782	6.98		0	▼1
Victorian Socialists	1,571	2.90		0	Steady
Independent Socialist Alliance	1,565	2.89		0	Steady
Formal votes	54,154	97.69			
Informal votes	1,280	2.31			
Total	55,434	100.00		9	Steady
Registered voters / turnout	84,066				

=== Bolin ===
2024 Victorian local elections: Bolin Ward
Party	Candidate	Votes	%	±%
Independent Liberal	Geoff Gough	3,394	40.16	–4.81
Independent	Valerie Judge	1,921	22.73	
Victorian Socialists	Dimitrios Tafidis	1,571	18.59	
Ind. Socialist Alliance	Mary Helen Merkenich	1,565	18.52	
Total formal votes		8,451	98.18	+0.27
Informal votes		157	1.82	–0.27
Turnout		8,608	85.75	–0.93
Two-candidate-preferred result
Independent Liberal	Geoff Gough	4,390	51.95	–3.18
Independent	Valerie Judge	4,061	48.05	
Independent Liberal hold		Swing	–3.18	

=== Currawong ===
2024 Victorian local elections: Currawong Ward
Party	Candidate	Votes	%	±%
Independent Liberal	Andrew Conlon	4,346	57.44	+19.62
Independent	Kelvin Lim	1,774	23.45	
Greens	Deepak Joshi	1,446	19.11	
Total formal votes		7,566	98.20	+0.42
Informal votes		139	1.80	–0.42
Turnout		7,705	88.16	–0.76
After distribution of preferences
Independent Liberal hold				

=== Manna ===
2024 Victorian local elections: Manna Ward
Party	Candidate	Votes	%	±%
Greens	Tomas Lightbody	2,336	31.63	–2.86
Independent Liberal	Peter Timothy Bain	1,874	25.37	
Independent Liberal	Daniel Di Cosmo	1,338	18.12	
Independent Liberal	Darryl Kilmartin	1,214	16.44	–0.09
Independent Liberal	Bronte Howell	624	8.45	
Total formal votes		7,386	97.27	+0.21
Informal votes		207	2.73	–0.21
Turnout		7,593	85.94	–0.32
Two-candidate-preferred result
Independent Liberal	Peter Timothy Bain	3,840	51.99	
Greens	Tomas Lightbody	3,546	48.01	–6.18
Independent Liberal gain from Greens				

=== Ruffey ===
2024 Victorian local elections: Ruffey Ward
Party	Candidate	Votes	%	±%
Independent Liberal	Jim Grivas	2,826	35.18	
Independent	Dionne Dearman	1,922	23.93	
Independent	Stephen Brennan	1,692	21.07	
Independent Liberal	Amanda Paliouras	1,592	19.82	
Total formal votes		8,032	97.72	+0.11
Informal votes		187	2.28	–0.11
Turnout		8,219	86.66	–0.61
Two-candidate-preferred result
Independent Liberal	Jim Grivas	4,352	54.18	
Independent	Dionne Dearman	3,680	45.82	
Independent Liberal gain from Independent				

=== Schramm ===
2024 Victorian local elections: Schramm Ward
Party	Candidate	Votes	%	±%
Independent	Laura Mayne	2,899	39.10	+2.78
Independent	Dot Haynes	2,096	28.27	–2.14
Independent Liberal	James Bae	1,869	25.21	
Independent	Hadi Miri	550	7.42	
Total formal votes		7,414	97.40	+0.13
Informal votes		198	2.60	–0.13
Turnout		7,612	83.57	+0.34
Two-candidate-preferred result
Independent	Laura Mayne	4,179	56.37	+0.96
Independent	Dot Haynes	3,235	43.63	–0.96
Independent hold		Swing	+0.96	

=== Tullamore ===
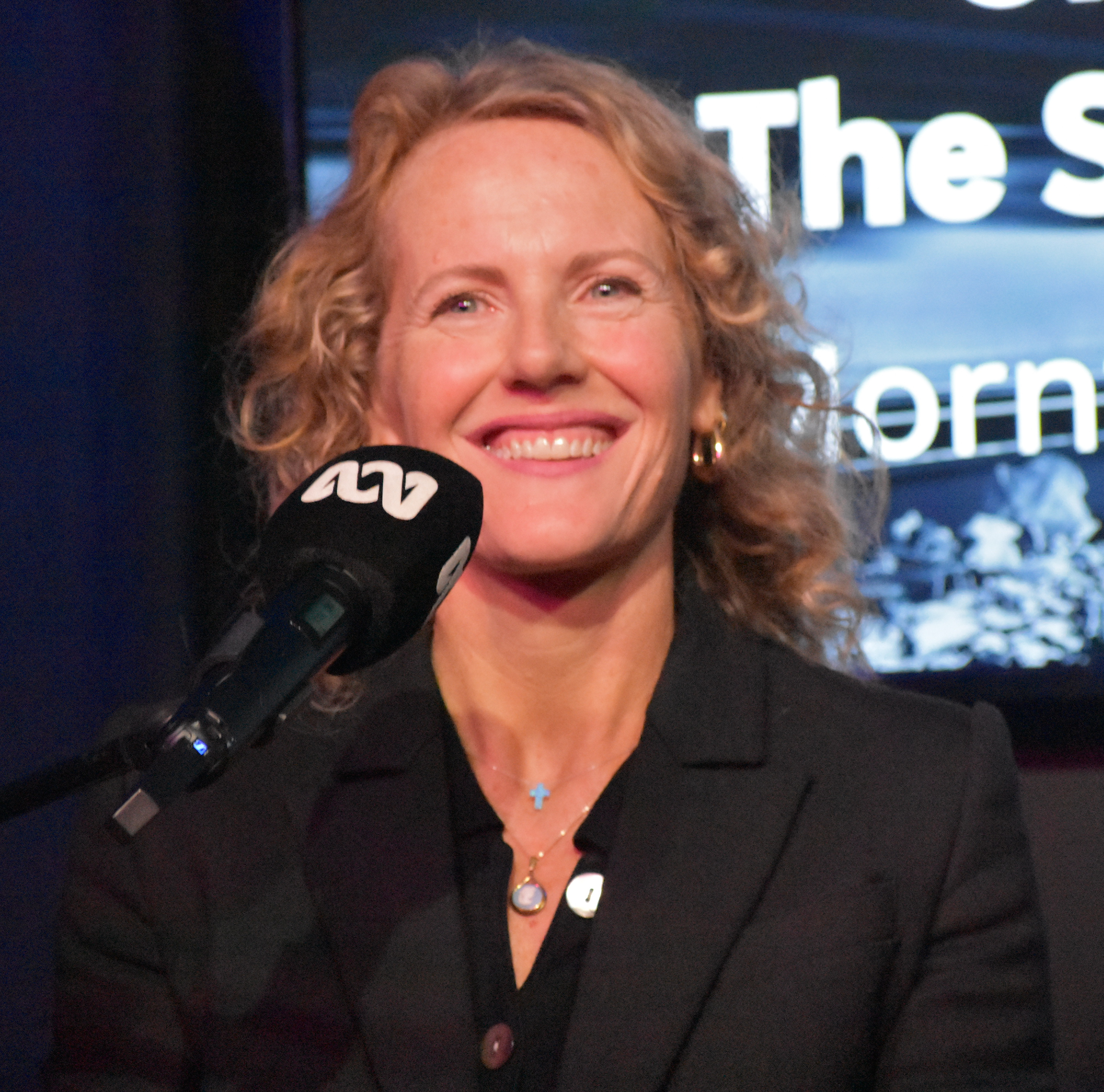
Deirdre Diamante (pictured) was elected unopposed in Tullamore Ward.

2024 Victorian local elections: Tullamore Ward
Party	Candidate	Votes	%	±%
Independent Liberal	Deirdre Diamante	unopposed		
Registered electors		9,534		
Independent Liberal hold				

=== Waldau ===
2024 Victorian local elections: Waldau Ward
Party	Candidate	Votes	%	±%
Independent	Anna Chen	3,518	46.60	+11.88
Independent	Raymond Lai	1,544	20.45	+4.14
Independent	Noha Aly	1,367	18.11	
Independent	Helen Hu	696	9.22	
Independent	Alki Poon	424	5.62	
Total formal votes		7,549	97.19	+0.34
Informal votes		218	2.81	–0.34
Turnout		7,767	87.10	+0.12
After distribution of preferences
Independent	Anna Chen	4,062	53.81	
Independent	Raymond Lai	1,967	26.06	
Independent	Noha Aly	1,520	20.14	
Independent hold				

=== Westerfolds ===
2024 Victorian local elections: Westerfolds Ward
Party	Candidate	Votes	%	±%
Independent Liberal	Michelle Kleinert	3,373	43.49	+4.94
Independent	Isabella Eltaha	3,241	41.79	
Independent	Dean Greguric	1,142	14.72	
Independent	Tegan Dunne (ineligible) (Note: Candidate was ineligible to contest the election after not completing mandatory candidate training. They still appeared on the ballot as they were only "retired" by the Victorian Electoral Commission after ballot papers had been printed, however they could not serve as a councillor and their votes were distributed to other candidates according to voters' preferences.)	N/A	N/A	
Total formal votes		7,756	97.81	+0.21
Informal votes		174	2.19	–0.21
Turnout		7,930	85.45	–0.63
Two-candidate-preferred result
Independent	Isabella Eltaha	4,040	52.09	
Independent Liberal	Michelle Kleinert	3,716	47.91	
Independent gain from Independent Liberal				

=== Yarra ===
2024 Victorian local elections: Yarra Ward
Party	Candidate	Votes	%	±%
Independent	Carli Lange	unopposed		
Registered electors		10,129		
Independent hold				

== Maroondah ==
2024 Maroondah City Council election
- October 2024

All 9 seats on Maroondah City Council 5 seats needed for a majority
- Registered: 81,050
- Turnout: 85.19%
	First party	Second party	Third party
	IND	IND	IND
Party	Independent	Ind. Liberal	Ind. Labor
Last election	4 seats	2 seats	3 seats
Seats won	4	4	1
Seat change	Steady	▲2	▼2
First preference vote	42,231	17,982	6,367
Percentage	63.43%	27.01%	9.56%
- 2020 and 2024 ward boundaries. Expand the map and click on a ward to see the ward name
Largest party before election
No overall control
Subsequent largest party
No overall control

Maroondah City Council is composed of nine single-member wards.

=== Maroondah results ===
2024 Victorian local elections: Maroondah
Party	Votes	%	Swing	Seats	Change
Independent	42,231	63.43		4	Steady
Independent Liberal	17,982	27.01		4	▲2
Independent Labor	6,367	9.56		1	▼2
Formal votes	66,580	96.43			
Informal votes	2,468	3.57			
Total	69,048	100.00		9	
Registered voters / turnout	81,050	85.19			

=== Barngeong ===
2024 Victorian local elections: Barngeong Ward (Note: Swings and percentage changes compared to results of the 2023 Barngeong Ward by-election.)
Party	Candidate	Votes	%	±%
Independent	Chris Jones	6,155	79.62	+43.63
Independent Liberal	Sebastian Moon	1,575	20.38	
Total formal votes		7,730	95.29	–1.59
Informal votes		382	4.71	+1.59
Turnout		8,112	87.30	+10.44
Independent hold		Swing	+19.08	

=== Bungalook ===
2024 Victorian local elections: Bungalook Ward
Party	Candidate	Votes	%	±%
Independent	Catherine Gordon	3,516	50.63	
Independent Labor	Tony Dib	2,276	32.77	
Independent	Peter Walne	1,153	16.60	
Independent	Wendy Rowles (ineligible)	N/A	N/A	
Total formal votes		6,945	96.92	
Informal votes		221	3.08	
Turnout		7,166	84.67	
Independent gain from Independent Labor				

=== Jubilee ===
2024 Victorian local elections: Jubilee Ward
Party	Candidate	Votes	%	±%
Independent Liberal	Claire Rex	3,354	46.11	
Independent	Caroline Nordio	3,005	41.31	
Independent	Emily Brightside	915	12.58	–16.66
Total formal votes		7,274	97.04	+0.93
Informal votes		222	2.96	–0.93
Turnout		7,496	84.41	+1.29
Two-candidate-preferred result
Independent Liberal	Claire Rex	3,907	53.71	
Independent	Caroline Nordio	3,367	46.29	
Independent Liberal gain from Independent Labor				

=== McAlpin ===
2024 Victorian local elections: McAlpin Ward
Party	Candidate	Votes	%	±%
Independent Liberal	Nathaniel Henderson	3,081	38.35	
Independent	Suzy Stojanovic	3,036	37.79	+11.72
Independent Liberal	Ryan Smith	1,916	23.85	
Total formal votes		8,033	97.70	+0.63
Informal votes		189	2.30	–0.63
Turnout		8,222	87.51	+1.05
Two-candidate-preferred result
Independent Liberal	Nathaniel Henderson	4,162	51.81	
Independent	Suzy Stojanovic	3,871	48.19	–4.59
Independent Liberal gain from Independent				

=== Tarralla ===
2024 Victorian local elections: Tarralla Ward
Party	Candidate	Votes	%	±%
Independent Labor	Paul Macdonald	4,091	57.17	+13.56
Independent	Aaron Martini	3,065	42.83	
Total formal votes		7,156	96.05	–0.74
Informal votes		294	3.95	+0.74
Turnout		7,450	83.86	+1.94
Independent Labor hold				

=== Wicklow ===
2024 Victorian local elections: Wicklow Ward
Party	Candidate	Votes	%	±%
Independent	Daniella Heatherich	4,047	51.73	
Independent	Tasa Damante	3,776	48.27	+20.24
Total formal votes		7,823	95.61	–2.03
Informal votes		359	4.39	+2.03
Turnout		8,182	82.06	+0.76
Two-candidate-preferred result
Independent	Daniella Heatherich	4,047	51.73	
Independent	Tasa Damante	3,776	48.27	–4.65
Independent gain from Independent				

=== Wombolano ===
2024 Victorian local elections: Wombolano Ward
Party	Candidate	Votes	%	±%
Independent Liberal	Kylie Spears	3,807	58.21	+6.76
Independent	Susan Burgess	2,733	41.79	
Total formal votes		6,540	95.75	–1.34
Informal votes		290	4.25	+1.34
Turnout		6,830	83.75	+0.86
Independent Liberal hold				

=== Wonga ===
2024 Victorian local elections: Wonga Ward (Note: Swings and percentage changes compared to results of the 2022 Wonga Ward by-election.)
Party	Candidate	Votes	%	±%
Independent Liberal	Linda Hancock	4,249	57.14	+36.09
Independent	Brendan Woods	3,187	42.86	
Total formal votes		7,436	95.71	+1.01
Informal votes		333	4.29	–1.01
Turnout		7,769	84.83	+8.57
Independent Liberal hold		Swing	+4.95	

=== Yarrunga ===
2024 Victorian local elections: Yarrunga Ward
Party	Candidate	Votes	%	±%
Independent	Rob Steane	3,816	49.93	–4.30
Independent	Andrew Schafer	3,104	40.61	–5.16
Independent	Michelle Radojkovic	723	9.46	
Total formal votes		7,643	97.72	+1.60
Informal votes		178	2.28	–1.60
Turnout		7,821	88.37	–0.28
Two-candidate-preferred result
Independent	Rob Steane	4,102	53.67	–0.56
Independent	Andrew Schafer	3,541	46.33	+0.56
Independent hold		Swing	–0.56	

== Monash ==
2024 Monash City Council election
- 26 October 2024

All 11 seats on Monash City Council 6 seats needed for a majority
- 2024 ward boundaries. Expand the map and click on a ward to see the ward name
Largest party before election
Independent Labor
Subsequent largest party
Independent Labor

Monash City Council is composed of 11 single-member wards. Prior to the 2024 election, it was composed of four multi-member wards (one two-member ward, three three-member wards), but the electoral structure has changed as a result of the Local Government Act 2020.

=== Monash results ===
2024 Victorian local elections: Monash
Party	Votes	%	Swing	Seats	Change
Independent Labor	35,917	42.08		7	Steady
Independents	30,303	35.51		4	▲3
Independent Liberal	9,569	11.21		0	▼1
Greens	6,102	7.15		0	▼2
Libertarian	1,808	2.12	+2.12	0	Steady
Victorian Socialists	1,646	1.93	+1.93	0	Steady
Formal votes	85,345	97.39			
Informal votes	2,290	2.61			
Total	87,635	100.00		11	Steady
Registered voters / turnout	114,010				

=== Banksia ===
2024 Victorian local elections: Banksia Ward
Party	Candidate	Votes	%	±%
Independent	Cameron Little	2,747	34.43	
Independent Labor	Arthur Athanasopoulos	1,991	24.96	
Independent	Michelle Hua	1,437	18.01	
Independent	Corey Matthews	1,027	12.87	
Independent	Sweety Sharad Mahimkar	776	9.73	
Total formal votes		7,978	97.55	
Informal votes		200	2.45	
Turnout		8,178	81.76	
Two-candidate-preferred result
Independent	Cameron Little	4,954	62.10	
Independent Labor	Arthur Athanasopoulos	3,024	37.90	
Independent win		(new ward)		

=== Blackburn ===
2024 Victorian local elections: Blackburn Ward
Party	Candidate	Votes	%	±%
Independent Labor	Rebecca Paterson	4,157	48.57	
Greens	Dewani Harahap	1,390	16.24	
Independent Labor	Raston Nga	1,329	15.53	
Independent	Jianhang Zhuang	969	11.32	
Independent	Matthew Leffler	713	8.33	
Total formal votes		8,558	97.96	
Informal votes		178	2.04	
Turnout		8,736	85.26	
After distribution of preferences
Independent Labor	Rebecca Paterson	4,510	52.70	
Greens	Dewani Harahap	1,492	17.43	
Independent Labor	Raston Nga	1,486	17.36	
Independent	Jianhang Zhuang	1,070	12.50	
Independent Labor win		(new ward)		

=== Gallaghers ===
2024 Victorian local elections: Gallaghers Ward
Party	Candidate	Votes	%	±%
Independent Labor	Geoff Lake	unopposed		
Registered electors		10,495		
Independent Labor win		(new ward)		

=== Gardiners Creek ===
2024 Victorian local elections: Gardiners Creek Ward
Party	Candidate	Votes	%	±%
Independent	Anjalee de Silva	3,842	45.03	
Independent Liberal	Maria Ngo	1,981	23.22	
Independent Liberal	Solomon Lin	1,568	18.38	
Independent Labor	Jonathon Wight	612	7.17	
Victorian Socialists	Jacob van der Eynden	530	6.21	
Total formal votes		8,533	96.94	
Informal votes		269	3.06	
Turnout		8,802	84.81	
After distribution of preferences
Independent	Anjalee de Silva	4,460	52.27	
Independent Liberal	Maria Ngo	2,204	25.83	
Independent Liberal	Solomon Lin	1,869	21.90	
Independent win		(new ward)		

=== Jells ===
2024 Victorian local elections: Jells Ward
Party	Candidate	Votes	%	±%
Independent Liberal	Marcus Fernandez	3,560	37.44	
Independent Labor	Elisha Lee	2,763	29.06	
Independent Labor	Dustin Kim	1,263	13.28	
Independent	Rajesh Pasupuleti	857	9.01	
Independent Labor	Christine Wilson	762	8.01	
Independent	Philip Liberatore	303	3.19	
Total formal votes		9,508	97.98	
Informal votes		196	2.02	
Turnout		9,704	88.32	
Two-candidate-preferred result
Independent Labor	Elisha Lee	4,775	50.22	
Independent Liberal	Marcus Fernandez	4,733	49.78	
Independent Labor win		(new ward)		

=== Mayfield ===
2024 Victorian local elections: Mayfield Ward
Party	Candidate	Votes	%	±%
Independent Labor	Brian Little	3,206	40.48	
Libertarian	Ethelyn King	1,808	22.83	
Greens	Stefanie Bauer	1,108	13.99	
Independent	Neha Yadav	780	9.85	
Independent	Oksana King	728	9.19	
Independent	Manohar Pawar	290	3.66	
Total formal votes		7,920	97.27	
Informal votes		222	2.73	
Turnout		8,142	84.16	
Two-candidate-preferred result
Independent Labor	Brian Little	4,978	62.85	
Libertarian	Ethelyn King	2,942	37.15	
Independent Labor win		(new ward)		

=== Scotchmans Creek ===
2024 Victorian local elections: Scotchmans Creek Ward
Party	Candidate	Votes	%	±%
Independent Labor	Nicky Luo	4,781	50.91	
Independent Liberal	Louis Shivarev	2,460	26.20	
Independent Labor	Bill Dayandas	2,150	22.89	
Total formal votes		9,391	98.13	
Informal votes		179	1.87	
Turnout		9,570	86.45	
Independent Labor win		(new ward)		

=== University ===
2024 Victorian local elections: University Ward
Party	Candidate	Votes	%	±%
Independent	Josh Fergeus	3,914	48.72	
Independent	Dominique Murphy	1,262	15.71	
Independent Labor	Toby Taylor	1,202	14.96	
Greens	Martin Barry	854	10.63	
Independent	Shashi Kochhar	802	9.98	
Total formal votes		8,034	97.29	
Informal votes		224	2.71	
Turnout		8,258	80.91	
After distribution of preferences
Independent	Josh Fergeus	4,125	51.34	
Independent	Dominique Murphy	1,444	17.97	
Independent Labor	Toby Taylor	1,329	16.54	
Greens	Martin Barry	1,136	14.14	
Independent win		(new ward)		

=== Warrigal ===
2024 Victorian local elections: Warrigal Ward
Party	Candidate	Votes	%	±%
Independent Labor	Stuart James	5,516	66.73	
Greens	Natasha Abrahams	2,750	33.27	
Total formal votes		8,266	96.14	
Informal votes		332	3.86	
Turnout		8,598	82.96	
Independent Labor win		(new ward)		

=== Waverley Park ===
2024 Victorian local elections: Waverley Park Ward
Party	Candidate	Votes	%	±%
Independent	Shane McCluskey	5,242	57.74	
Independent	Aret Muradyan	2,720	29.96	
Victorian Socialists	Renee Nayef	1,116	12.29	
Total formal votes		9,078	98.30	
Informal votes		157	1.70	
Turnout		9,235	87.39	
Independent win		(new ward)		

=== Wellington ===
2024 Victorian local elections: Wellington Ward
Party	Candidate	Votes	%	±%
Independent Labor	Paul Klisaris	6,185	76.56	
Independent	Mazharul Chowdhury	1,894	23.44	
Total formal votes		8,079	96.04	
Informal votes		333	3.96	
Turnout		8,412	83.97	
Independent Labor win		(new ward)		

== Whitehorse ==
2024 Whitehorse City Council election
- October 2024

All 11 seats on Whitehorse City Council 6 seats needed for a majority
	First party	Second party	Third party
	IND	IND	IND
Party	Independent	Ind. Liberal	Ind. Labor
Last election	5 seats	6 seats	0 seats
Seats before	5	6	0
Seats won	8	2	1
Seat change	▲3	▼4	▲1
First preference vote	57,348	21,771	4,566
Percentage	64.23	24.39	5.11
- 2020 and 2024 ward boundaries. Expand the map and click on a ward to see the ward name
Largest party before election
Independent Liberal
Subsequent largest party
Independents

Whitehorse City Council is composed of 11 single-member wards.

=== Whitehorse results ===
2024 Victorian local elections: Whitehorse
Party	Votes	%	Swing	Seats	Change
Independents	57,348	64.23		8	▲3
Independent Liberal	21,771	24.39		2	▼4
Independent Labor	4,566	5.11		1	▲1
Victorian Socialists	2,675	3.00		0	Steady
Greens	1,718	1.92		0	Steady
Independent Freedom	1,201	1.35		0	Steady
Formal votes	89,279	97.54			
Informal votes	2,249	2.46			
Total	91,528	100.00		11	Steady
Registered voters / turnout	106,117	86.25			

=== Cootamundra ===
2024 Victorian local elections: Cootamundra Ward
Party	Candidate	Votes	%	±%
Independent	Kieran Simpson	2,293	27.69	
Independent Liberal	Andrew Munroe	2,253	27.21	–10.05
Greens	Nyssa Leereveld	1,718	20.75	
Independent Freedom	Greg Cheesman	1,201	14.50	
Independent	Jeffrey Rickard	594	7.17	
Victorian Socialists	Alec Waleed Ferguson	222	2.68	
Total formal votes		8,281	98.08	+0.15
Informal votes		162	1.92	–0.15
Turnout		8,443	87.62	+0.47
Two-candidate-preferred result
Independent	Kieran Simpson	4,215	50.90	
Independent Liberal	Andrew Munroe	4,066	49.10	–1.67
Independent gain from Independent Liberal				

=== Eley ===
2024 Victorian local elections: Eley Ward
Party	Candidate	Votes	%	±%
Independent	Daniel Griffiths	2,857	33.47	
Independent Liberal	David Solly	2,299	26.93	–5.08
Independent	Trudy Skilbeck	1,461	17.11	–22.45
Independent	Yuhong Liu	1,061	12.43	
Independent	Euan Thomas	859	10.06	
Total formal votes		8,537	97.76	–0.12
Informal votes		196	2.24	+0.12
Turnout		8,733	85.88	–1.16
Two-candidate-preferred result
Independent	Daniel Griffiths	4,619	54.11	
Independent Liberal	David Solly	3,918	45.89	–0.79
Independent gain from Independent				

- Darren Ludowyke nominated to contest the election, but was found to be ineligible after not completing mandatory candidate training. He was "retired" as a candidate on 20 September 2024 and did not appear on the ballot paper.

=== Elgar ===
2024 Victorian local elections: Elgar Ward
Party	Candidate	Votes	%	±%
Independent	Blair Barker	3,765	49.87	+8.08
Independent Labor	David Tenni	1,312	17.38	
Independent	Thu Le	1,249	16.54	
Victorian Socialists	Heather Maltby	1,224	16.21	
Total formal votes		7,550	98.17	+0.28
Informal votes		141	1.83	–0.28
Turnout		7,691	84.28	+0.55
After distribution of preferences
Independent	Blair Barker	4,322	57.25	+4.20
Independent Labor	David Tenni	1,660	21.99	
Independent	Thu Le	1,568	20.77	
Councillor changed to Independent from Independent Liberal		Swing	+4.20	

=== Kingsley ===
2024 Victorian local elections: Kingsley Ward
Party	Candidate	Votes	%	±%
Independent Liberal	Kirsten Langford	2,235	27.53	
Independent Liberal	Amanda McNeill	1,927	23.74	–7.52
Independent Liberal	Maeve Luu	1,249	15.39	
Independent	Nadia Pitisano	1,006	12.39	
Independent Liberal	Greg Smith	798	9.83	
Independent Labor	Jotin Tonjamba Khuman	461	5.68	
Independent Liberal	Gayle Goldsmith	442	5.44	
Total formal votes		8,118	97.58	–0.71
Informal votes		201	2.42	+0.71
Turnout		8,319	86.54	+0.01
Two-candidate-preferred result
Independent Liberal	Kirsten Langford	4,444	54.74	
Independent Liberal	Amanda McNeill	3,674	45.26	–5.01
Independent Liberal gain from Independent Liberal				

=== Lake ===
2024 Victorian local elections: Lake Ward
Party	Candidate	Votes	%	±%
Independent Liberal	Denise Massoud	2,883	33.64	–12.94
Independent Labor	Hayley Weller	2,793	32.59	
Independent	Zak Fennell	1,866	21.77	
Independent	Hong Lin Zheng	1,028	12.00	
Total formal votes		8,570	97.91	+0.31
Informal votes		183	2.09	–0.31
Turnout		8,753	87.92	+1.16
Two-candidate-preferred result
Independent Labor	Hayley Weller	4,320	50.41	
Independent Liberal	Denise Massoud	4,250	49.59	–4.95
Independent Labor hold				

=== Mahoneys ===
2024 Victorian local elections: Mahoneys Ward
Party	Candidate	Votes	%	±%
Independent Liberal	Mark Lane	2,721	31.43	+6.18
Independent	Jason Martin	2,698	31.16	+9.39
Independent	Anne V. Makhijani	1,726	19.94	–0.41
Independent	Nildhara Gadani	1,513	17.48	+2.84
Total formal votes		8,658	97.65	+0.00
Informal votes		208	2.35	–0.00
Turnout		8,866	86.14	+0.79
Two-candidate-preferred result
Independent	Jason Martin	4,532	52.34	
Independent Liberal	Mark Lane	4,126	47.66	–4.34
Independent gain from Independent Liberal				

=== Simpson ===
2024 Victorian local elections: Simpson Ward
Party	Candidate	Votes	%	±%
Independent	Prue Cutts	4,805	56.24	+3.37
Independent	Tim Kirke	3,739	43.76	
Total formal votes		8,544	96.36	–1.57
Informal votes		323	3.64	+1.57
Turnout		8,867	87.64	+0.01
Independent hold				

=== Sparks ===
2024 Victorian local elections: Sparks Ward
Party	Candidate	Votes	%	±%
Independent	Peter John Allan	2,622	35.98	
Independent	Tina Liu	2,139	29.35	+9.01
Independent	Aaron Qin	1,229	16.86	
Victorian Socialists	Saravina Afaj	678	9.30	
Independent	Carol Zhang	620	8.51	
Total formal votes		7,288	97.73	+1.78
Informal votes		169	2.27	–1.78
Turnout		7,457	84.00	+2.33
Two-candidate-preferred result
Independent	Peter John Allan	3,646	50.03	
Independent	Tina Liu	3,642	49.97	–1.37
Independent gain from Independent				

=== Terrara ===
2024 Victorian local elections: Terrara Ward
Party	Candidate	Votes	%	±%
Independent	Jarrod Gunn	6,455	79.95	+40.73
Independent	George Manos	1,619	20.05	
Total formal votes		8,074	96.45	–1.24
Informal votes		297	3.55	+1.24
Turnout		8,371	88.57	+0.21
Independent gain from Independent		Swing	+32.21	

=== Walker ===
2024 Victorian local elections: Walker Ward
Party	Candidate	Votes	%	±%
Independent	Ben Stennett	3,217	37.76	–12.89
Independent	Stephanie Gaut	1,958	22.98	
Independent Liberal	Philip Daw	1,186	13.92	
Independent Liberal	Preston Brown	1,072	12.58	
Victorian Socialists	Josh Dwyer	551	6.47	
Independent	Christine Davis	535	6.28	
Total formal votes		8,519	97.56	+0.18
Informal votes		213	2.44	–0.18
Turnout		8,732	87.41	+1.60
Two-candidate-preferred result
Independent	Ben Stennett	5,002	58.72	
Independent	Stephanie Gaut	3,517	41.28	
Independent hold				

=== Wattle ===
2024 Victorian local elections: Wattle Ward
Party	Candidate	Votes	%	±%
Independent Liberal	Andrew Davenport	2,706	37.90	–13.72
Independent	Sandy Li	2,225	31.16	
Independent	Greg Dixon	2,209	30.94	
Total formal votes		7,140	97.86	–0.06
Informal votes		156	2.14	+0.06
Turnout		7,296	82.08	+0.98
Two-candidate-preferred result
Independent Liberal	Andrew Davenport	4,029	56.43	
Independent	Sandy Li	3,111	43.57	
Independent Liberal hold				

== Yarra Ranges ==
2024 Yarra Ranges Shire Council election
- October 2024

All 9 seats on Yarra Ranges Shire Council 5 seats needed for a majority
	First party	Second party	Third party
	IND	IND	IND
Party	Independent	Ind. Liberal	Independent National
Last election	8 seats	0 seats	1 seat
Seats after	6	2	1
Seat change	▼2	▲2	Steady
First preference vote	48,551	10,385	4,360
Percentage	67.74%	14.49%	6.08%
- 2020 and 2024 ward boundaries. Expand the map and click on a ward to see the ward name
Largest party before election
Independent
Subsequent largest party
Independent

Yarra Ranges Shire Council is composed of nine single-member wards.

=== Yarra Ranges results ===
2024 Victorian local elections: Yarra Ranges
Party	Votes	%	Swing	Seats	Change
Independent	48,551	67.74	–9.31	6	▼2
Independent Liberal	10,385	14.49	+7.44	2	▲2
Independent Libertarian	5,127	7.15	+6.13	0	Steady
Independent National	4,360	6.08	–0.80	1	Steady
Greens	1,083	1.51	–0.44	0	Steady
Animal Justice	791	1.10	+1.10	0	Steady
Independent Labor	762	1.06	–3.73	0	Steady
Victorian Socialists	618	0.86	+0.86	0	Steady
Formal votes	71,677	95.97			
Informal votes	3,012	4.03			
Total	74,689	100.00		9	Steady
Registered voters / turnout	116,724 (Note: This number is inclusive of the total number of enrolled voters across all wards.)	83.02 (Note: This number does not include enrolled voters from uncontested wards. It is the total turnout for contested wards only.)			

=== Billanook ===
2024 Victorian local elections: Billanook Ward
Party	Candidate	Votes	%	±%
Independent	Tim Heenan	6,601	56.28	+27.60
Independent Libertarian	Wendy Wright	5,127	43.72	
Total formal votes		11,728	95.55	–1.26
Informal votes		546	4.45	+1.26
Turnout		12,274	83.45	–2.60
Independent hold		Swing	–0.28	

=== Chandler ===
2024 Victorian local elections: Chandler Ward
Party	Candidate	Votes	%	±%
Independent Liberal	Gareth Ward	3,886	39.46	
Independent	Belinda Grooby	3,224	32.74	
Independent Liberal	Ashley Hansen	2,737	27.80	
Total formal votes		9,847	96.48	–0.95
Informal votes		359	3.52	+0.95
Turnout		10,206	82.50	–2.46
Two-candidate-preferred result
Independent Liberal	Gareth Ward	5,498	55.83	
Independent	Belinda Grooby	4,349	44.17	
Independent Liberal gain from Independent				

=== Chirnside ===
2024 Victorian local elections: Chirnside Ward
Party	Candidate	Votes	%	±%
Independent	Richard Higgins	unopposed		
Registered electors		13,377		
Independent hold				

=== Lyster ===
2024 Victorian local elections: Lyster Ward
Party	Candidate	Votes	%	±%
Independent	Peter Mcilwain	3,679	37.25	
Independent	Mick Spruhan	3,177	32.17	
Independent	Divesh Sareen	3,020	30.58	
Total formal votes		9,876	96.50	–0.54
Informal votes		358	3.50	+0.54
Turnout		10,234	84.45	–0.61
Two-candidate-preferred result
Independent	Peter Mcilwain	5,436	55.04	
Independent	Mick Spruhan	4,440	44.96	
Independent gain from Independent				

=== Melba ===
2024 Victorian local elections: Melba Ward
Party	Candidate	Votes	%	±%
Independent	Sophie Todorov	4,159	38.74	+6.04
Independent Liberal	Mitch Mazzarella	3,762	35.04	
Independent	Chris Templer	2,815	26.22	+5.34
Total formal votes		10,736	97.29	+0.44
Informal votes		299	2.71	–0.44
Turnout		11,035	81.54	–1.73
Two-candidate-preferred result
Independent Liberal	Mitch Mazzarella	5,420	50.48	
Independent	Sophie Todorov	5,316	49.52	–8.19
Independent Liberal gain from Independent				

=== O'Shannassy ===
2024 Victorian local elections: O'Shannassy Ward
Party	Candidate	Votes	%	±%
Independent National	Jim Child	4,360	45.36	–19.97
Independent	Karen Duke	1,116	11.61	–23.06
Greens	Wil Mikelsons	1,083	11.26	
Independent	R. Jane Stormer	881	9.17	
Animal Justice	Chloe Bond	791	8.23	
Independent Labor	James Talbett	762	7.93	
Victorian Socialists	Dylan J. Little	618	6.43	
Total formal votes		9,611	95.97	+0.55
Informal votes		404	4.03	–0.55
Turnout		10,015	79.99	–1.29
After distribution of preferences
Independent National	Jim Child	4,838	50.34	
Independent	Karen Duke	1,793	18.66	
Greens	Wil Mikelsons	1,520	15.82	
Animal Justice	Chloe Bond	1,460	15.19	
Independent National hold				

=== Ryrie ===
2024 Victorian local elections: Ryrie Ward
Party	Candidate	Votes	%	±%
Independent	Fiona McAllister	unopposed		
Registered electors		13,380		
Independent hold				

=== Streeton ===
2024 Victorian local elections: Streeton Ward (Note: Swings and percentage changes are compared to results of the 2022 Streeton Ward by-election.)
Party	Candidate	Votes	%	±%
Independent	Jeff Marriott	6,006	60.37	
Independent	Sigrid Petersen	3,943	39.63	
Total formal votes		9,949	94.92	–1.64
Informal votes		532	5.08	+1.64
Turnout		10,481	86.61	+7.70
Independent gain from Independent				

=== Walling ===
2024 Victorian local elections: Walling Ward
Party	Candidate	Votes	%	±%
Independent	Len Cox	6,808	68.56	+32.71
Independent	David Ferrier	3,122	31.44	
Total formal votes		9,930	95.08	–1.77
Informal votes		514	4.92	+1.77
Turnout		10,444	82.83	–0.90
Independent hold		Swing	+18.18	

== See also ==
- Results of the 2024 Victorian local elections in Inner Melbourne
- Results of the 2024 Victorian local elections in Northern Melbourne
- Results of the 2024 Victorian local elections in South-Eastern Melbourne
- Results of the 2024 Victorian local elections in Western Melbourne
