= Results of the 2020 Victorian local elections in Hume =

2020 Victorian local elections (Hume)
- 24 October 2020

This is a list of results for the 2020 Victorian local elections in the Hume region.

Hume has a population of around 320,000 and covers twelve local government areas (LGAs), including the City of Greater Shepparton.

== Alpine ==
2020 Alpine Shire Council election
- 24 October 2020

All 7 seats on Alpine Shire Council 4 seats needed for a majority
	First party	Second party
	IND	AJP
Leader	N/A	Charlie Vincent
Party	Independents	Animal Justice
Last election	6 seats	0 seats
Seats before	6	0
Seats won	5	1
Seat change	▼1	▲1
First preference vote	8,079	812
Percentage	90.87%	9.13%
Swing		▲9.13
Largest party before election
Independents
Subsequent largest party
Independents

2020 Victorian local elections: Alpine
Party	Candidate	Votes	%	±%
Independent	Ron Janas (elected 1)	1,525	17.15	
Independent	Kelli Prime (elected 2)	1,157	13.01	
Independent	Tony Keeble (elected 3)	973	10.94	
Animal Justice	Charlie Vincent (elected 4)	812	9.13	+9.13
Independent	Katarina Chalwell (elected 5)	749	8.42	
Independent	Sarah Nicholas (elected 6)	642	7.22	
Independent	John Forsyth (elected 7)	604	7.29	
Independent	Daryl Pearce	521	5.86	
Independent	Simon Kelley	506	5.69	
Independent	Mario Vaccaro	483	5.43	
Independent	Mickey Fletcher	430	4.84	
Independent	Kitty Knappstein	284	3.19	
Independent	Jean-Pierre Ronco	205	2.31	
Total formal votes		8,891	95.04	
Informal votes		464	4.96	
Turnout		9,355	83.76	

== Wodonga ==
2020 Victorian local elections: Wodonga
Party	Candidate	Votes	%	±%
Independent	Kat Bennett (elected 1)	3,209	14.12	
Independent	Kev Poulton (elected 2)	2,230	9.81	
Independent	Graeme Simpfendorfer (elected 3)	2,085	9.17	
Independent	Libby Hall (elected 4)	1,623	7.14	
Independent	John Watson (elected 6)	1,519	6.68	
Independent	Ron Mildren (elected 5)	1,367	6.01	
Liberal Democrats	Olga Quilty (elected 7)	1,326	5.83	
Independent Liberal	Danny Chamberlain	1,287	5.66	
Independent	Danny Lowe	1,239	5.45	
Independent	Rick Del Monte	1,123	4.94	
Greens	Rupinder Kaur	944	4.15	
Independent	Willem Manley	884	3.89	
Independent	Beth O'Shea	797	3.51	
Labor	Simon Welsh	688	3.03	
Independent	Bernard Squire	643	2.83	
Independent	Michael Fraser	496	2.18	
Independent	Joseph Thomsen	474	2.09	
Independent	Brian Mitchell	406	1.79	
Independent	Andrew Lees	389	1.71	
Total formal votes		22,729	91.52	
Informal votes		2106	8.48	
Turnout		24,835	76.58	
