= Results of the 2020 Victorian local elections in Gippsland =

2020 Victorian local elections (Gippsland)
← 2016	24 October 2020	2024 →

This is a list of results for the 2020 Victorian local elections in the Gippsland region.

Gippsland has a population of around 310,000 and covers six local government areas (LGAs), including the City of Latrobe.

== Bass Coast ==
2020 Victorian local elections: Bass Coast
Party	Votes	%	Swing	Seats	Change
Independent	16,082	47.68		6	
Independent National	6,372	18.89		1	
Independent Liberal	4,645	13.77		1	
Independent Labor	4,284	12.70		1	
Greens	1,639	4.86		0	
Liberal	708	2.10		0	
Formal votes	33,730	96.91			
Informal votes	1,077	3.09			
Total	34,807	100.0		9	
Registered voters / turnout	42,627	81.65			

=== Bunurong ===
2020 Victorian local elections: Bunurong Ward
Party	Candidate	Votes	%	±%
Independent National	Brett Tessari	6,372	49.91	
Independent Labor	Leticia Laing	2,212	17.33	
Greens	Michael Nugent	1,639	12.84	
Independent	Les Larke	1,327	10.39	
Independent Liberal	Julian Brown	1,217	9.53	
Turnout		13,115	83.48	
Independent National win		Swing		
Independent Labor win		Swing		
Independent win		Swing		

=== Island ===
2020 Victorian local elections: Island Ward
Party	Candidate	Votes	%	±%
Independent	Michael Whelan	2,544	25.17	
Independent	Ron Bauer	2,239	22.16	
Independent	David Rooks	2,135	21.13	
Independent	Jeni Jobe	985	9.75	
Independent	Trish Cereni	740	7.32	
Liberal	Ash Belsar	708	7.01	
Independent	Mikhaela Barlow	438	4.33	
Independent	Darrell Silva	317	3.14	
Turnout		10,538	80.65	
Independent win		Swing		
Independent win		Swing		
Independent win		Swing		

=== Western Port ===
2020 Victorian local elections: Western Port Ward
Party	Candidate	Votes	%	±%
Independent Liberal	Bruce Kent	3,428	31.57	
Independent	Rochelle Halstead	2,872	26.45	
Independent	Clare Le Serve	2,485	22.89	
Independent Labor	Geoff Ellis	2,072	19.08	
Turnout		11,154	80.53	
Independent Liberal win		Swing		
Independent win		Swing		
Independent win		Swing		
