= Results of the 2020 Victorian local elections in Eastern Melbourne =

2024 Victorian local elections (Eastern Melbourne)
← 2016	24 October 2020	2024 →

This is a list of results for the 2020 Victorian local elections in the Eastern Melbourne region.

Eastern Melbourne covers the local government areas (LGAs) of Boroondara, Knox, Manningham, Maroondah, Monash, Whitehorse and Yarra Ranges.

== Boroondara ==
=== Boroondara results ===
2020 Victorian local elections: Boroondara
Party	Votes	%	Swing	Seats	Change
Independent	60,052	57.36		5	Steady
Burwood Liberals	31,700	30.28		5	Steady
Greens	5,999	5.43		1	▲1
Independent Liberal	2,745	2.32		0	Steady
Animal Justice	2,122	2.03		0	Steady
Independent Labor	1,929	1.68		0	▼1
Independent Greens	990	0.90		0	Steady
Formal votes	104,695	97.85			
Informal votes	2,295	2.15			
Total	106,990	100.00		11	▲1

=== Bellevue ===
2020 Victorian local elections: Bellevue Ward
Party	Candidate	Votes	%	±%
Independent	Jim Parke	4,431	44.73	
Independent	Greg Ball	1,994	18.33	
Greens	Astrid Judge	1,796	16.51	
Animal Justice	Sienna Watson	1,280	11.77	
Independent	Austin King	1,043	9.59	
Independent	Alex Sawyer	335	3.08	
Turnout		11,083	87.42	
Two-candidate-preferred result
Independent	Jim Parke	6,095	56.03	
Independent	Greg Ball	4,784	43.97	
Independent hold		Swing	N/A	

=== Cotham ===
2020 Victorian local elections: Cotham Ward
Party	Candidate	Votes	%	±%
Burwood Liberals	Felicity Sinfield	4,952	49.10	
Independent	Bill Young	3,900	38.67	
Independent Liberal	Keiron Long	1,233	12.23	
Turnout		10,293	86.99	
Two-candidate-preferred result
Burwood Liberals	Felicity Sinfield	5,807	57.58	
Independent	Bill Young	4,278	42.42	
Burwood Liberals hold		Swing	N/A	

=== Gardiner ===
2020 Victorian local elections: Gardiner Ward
Party	Candidate	Votes	%	±%
Independent	Victor Franco	3,724	36.19	
Burwood Liberals	Catherine Diggins	2,830	27.51	
Independent	Simon James Denton	1,670	16.23	
Independent	Terence Guthridge	1,078	10.48	
Independent	Greg Selkirk	987	9.59	
Turnout		10,497	86.10	
Two-candidate-preferred result
Independent	Victor Franco	5,478	53.24	
Burwood Liberals	Catherine Diggins	4,811	46.76	
Independent hold		Swing	N/A	

=== Glenferrie ===
2020 Victorian local elections: Glenferrie Ward
Party	Candidate	Votes	%	±%
Greens	Wes Gault	2,608	31.14	
Independent Labor	Steve Hurd	1,929	23.03	
Burwood Liberals	Henry Kerr	1,829	21.84	
Independent	Florence Edwards	1,273	15.20	
Independent	Luke Balasingam	604	7.21	
Independent	Lindon Brian Parbery	132	1.58	
Turnout		8,587	77.07	
Two-candidate-preferred result
Greens	Wes Gault	4,654	55.57	
Burwood Liberals	Henry Kerr	3,721	44.03	
Greens gain from Independent Labor		Swing	N/A	

=== Junction ===
2020 Victorian local elections: Junction Ward
Party	Candidate	Votes	%	±%
Independent	Di Gillies	4,311	52.05	
Independent	Greg Deakin	1,527	18.44	
Independent	Rowan Story	1,323	15.97	
Burwood Liberals	Ralph Krien	1,122	13.55	
Turnout		8,434	79.10	
Independent hold		Swing	N/A	

=== Lynden ===
2020 Victorian local elections: Lynden Ward
Party	Candidate	Votes	%	±%
Burwood Liberals	Lisa Hollingsworth	5,651	56.36	
Independent	Charlotte Wang	2,349	23.43	
Independent	Carl Le	2,027	20.22	
Turnout		10,220	86.95	
Burwood Liberals hold		Swing	N/A	

=== Maling ===
2020 Victorian local elections: Maling Ward
Party	Candidate	Votes	%	±%
Independent	Jane Addis	3,298	35.44	
Independent	Kristy Joy McIlvenna	1,303	14.00	
Independent	Richard Wilson	1,126	12.10	
Independent	Peter Campbell	938	10.08	
Independent	Peter Barclay	921	9.90	
Burwood Liberals	James Danches	706	7.59	
Independent	Robert Dennis	687	7.38	
Independent	Anthony Robert Deicmanis	326	3.50	
Turnout		9,521	87.59	
Two-candidate-preferred result
Independent	Jane Addis	5,420	58.25	
Independent	Kristy Joy McIlvenna	3,885	41.75	
Independent hold		Swing	N/A	

=== Maranoa ===
2020 Victorian local elections: Maranoa Ward
Party	Candidate	Votes	%	±%
Burwood Liberals	Cynthia Watson	3,458	35.91	
Independent	Yolanda Torrisi	1,374	14.27	
Independent	Chris Pattas	1,299	13.49	
Independent	Helen Grace Tsoutsouvas	1,160	12.05	
Independent Liberal	Bonnie Brown	1,136	11.80	
Independent	Mark Newlan	673	6.99	
Independent	Dennis Whelan	530	5.50	
Turnout		9,900	86.55	
Two-candidate-preferred result
Burwood Liberals	Cynthia Watson	5,759	59.80	
Independent	Yolanda Torrisi	3,871	40.20	
Burwood Liberals hold		Swing	N/A	

=== Riversdale ===
2020 Victorian local elections: Riversdale Ward
Party	Candidate	Votes	%	±%
Independent	Susan Biggar	2,997	36.66	
Burwood Liberals	Paul Dipnall	1,656	20.26	
Independent	Rob Baillieu	1,345	16.45	
Independent Greens	Nicholas Bieber	990	12.11	
Burwood Liberals	Sali Miftari	811	9.92	
Independent Liberal	Emily Kusay	376	4.60	
Turnout		8,378	79.32	
After distribution of preferences
Independent	Susan Biggar	4,253	52.02	
Burwood Liberals	Paul Dipnall	1,980	24.22	
Independent	Rob Baillieu	1,942	23.76	
Independent win		(new ward)		

=== Solway ===
2020 Victorian local elections: Solway Ward
Party	Candidate	Votes	%	±%
Burwood Liberals	Garry Thompson	4,028	41.65	
Independent	Alan Jane	3,251	33.61	
Independent	Sam Fitchett	2,393	24.74	
Turnout		9,866	88.11	
Two-candidate-preferred result
Burwood Liberals	Garry Thompson	5,475	56.61	
Independent	Alan Jane	4,197	43.39	
Burwood Liberals hold		Swing	N/A	

=== Studley ===
2020 Victorian local elections: Studley Ward
Party	Candidate	Votes	%	±%
Burwood Liberals	Ander Peterson	2,018	20.23	
Burwood Liberals	Nick Stavrou	1,675	16.79	
Greens	Qiqi Chen	1,595	15.99	
Independent	Annabel Yates	1,449	14.53	
Independent	Michele Agustin-Guarino	1,395	13.98	
Independent	Kym Sullivan	924	9.26	
Independent	Amelia Clark	919	9.29	
Turnout		10,211	83.09	
Two-candidate-preferred result
Burwood Liberals	Nick Stavrou	5,083	50.96	
Independent	Annabel Yates	4,892	49.04	
Burwood Liberals hold		Swing	N/A	

== Monash ==
2020 Victorian local elections: Monash
Party	Votes	%	Swing	Seats	Change
Independent Labor	44,343	45.71		6	
Burwood Liberals	20,167	20.79		1	
Independent	14,907	15.37		2	
Greens	11,314	11.66		2	
Independent Liberal	4,154	4.28		0	
Sustainable Australia	2,122	2.19		0	Steady
Formal votes	97,007	95.02			
Informal votes	5,080	4.98			
Total	102,087	100.00		11	
Registered voters / turnout	120,823	84.49			
