= Results of the 2020 Victorian local elections in Grampians =

2020 Victorian local elections (Inner Melbourne)
← 2016	24 October 2020	2024 →

This is a list of results for the 2020 Victorian local elections in the Grampians region.

The Grampians has a population of around 220,000 and covers 11 local government areas (LGAs), including the City of Ballarat.

== Ararat ==
2020 Victorian local elections: Ararat
Party	Candidate	Votes	%	±%
Independent National	Jo Armstrong (elected 1)	2,770	38.49	
Independent	William Waterston (elected 3)	862	11.98	
Independent	Bob Sanders (elected 4)	731	10.16	
Independent	Gwenda Allgood (elected 6)	538	7.48	
Independent	Henry Burridge (elected 5)	537	7.46	
Independent	Neil Manning	351	4.88	
Independent	Peter Beales (elected 2)	317	4.41	
Independent	Rob Armstrong (elected 7)	295	4.10	
Independent	Jane Goninon	284	3.95	
Independent	Colin McKenzie	212	2.95	
Independent	Bernardine Atkinson	165	2.29	
Independent	Cecilia Fresle	134	1.86	
Total formal votes		7,196	95.90	
Informal votes		308	4.10	
Turnout		7,504	83.80	

== Ballarat ==
2020 Victorian local elections: Ballarat
Party	Votes	%	Swing	Seats	Change
Independent	20,266	29.57	−17.82	3	▲1
Independent Liberal	17,403	25.39	−1.92	3	▼1
Labor	17,213	25.11	+11.62	2	Steady
Greens	11,614	16.94	+4.13	1	Steady
Australia First	1,391	2.03	+2.03	0	Steady
Animal Justice	659	0.96	+0.96	0	Steady
Formal votes	68,546	97.97			
Informal votes	1,420	2.03			
Total	69,966	100.0			
Registered voters / turnout	84,694	82.61			

=== Central ===
2020 Victorian local elections: Central Ward
Party	Candidate	Votes	%	±%
Greens	Belinda Coates	5,889	26.16	+4.83
Independent	Mark Harris	4,090	18.17	−11.97
Independent Liberal	Samantha McIntosh	3,886	17.26	−3.04
Independent	Nick Shady	2,884	12.81	
Labor	Geoff Howard	2,306	10.24	+1.75
Labor	Kumuda Simpson	1,691	7.51	+7.51
Independent	John Dooley	1,012	4.50	+4.50
Independent	Stephen Jones	754	3.35	+3.35
Turnout		23,186	82.47	
Greens hold		Swing	+4.83	
Independent hold		Swing	−11.97	
Independent Liberal hold		Swing	−3.04	

=== North ===
2020 Victorian local elections: North Ward
Party	Candidate	Votes	%	±%
Independent Liberal	Amy Johnson	6,335	26.75	−0.77
Independent	Peter Eddy	3,868	16.34	+16.34
Greens	Ellen Burns	3,392	14.33	+4.33
Labor	Daniel Moloney	2,931	12.38	+1.92
Labor	Jay Morrison	2,691	11.36	+11.36
Independent	David Harris	1,968	8.31	+8.31
Independent Liberal	Grant Tillett	1,834	7.75	−6.85
Animal Justice	Bryn Hills	659	2.78	+2.78
Turnout		23,678	84.68	+6.98
Independent Liberal hold		Swing	−0.77	
Independent gain from Liberal		Swing	+16.34	
Labor hold		Swing	+1.92	

=== South ===
2020 Victorian local elections: South Ward
Party	Candidate	Votes	%	±%
Labor	Des Hudson	5,841	26.13	+3.87
Independent Liberal	Ben Taylor	5,348	23.92	+5.02
Greens	Jackson Snep	2,333	10.44	+3.95
Independent	Tracey Hargreaves	2,315	10.36	+10.36
Independent	Jim Rinaldi	2,079	9.30	+9.30
Labor	Bridget Aitchison	1,753	7.84	+7.84
Australia First	Susan Jakobi	1,391	6.22	+6.22
Independent	Rachel Muir	1,296	5.80	+5.80
Turnout		23,102	83.67	
Labor hold		Swing	+3.87	
Independent Liberal hold		Swing	+5.02	
Independent gain from Independent		Swing	+10.36	
