= Results of the 2004 Victorian local elections =

This is a list of local government area results for the 2004 Victorian local elections.

== Yarra ==
2004 Victorian local elections: Yarra
Party	Votes	%	Seats	Change
Labor	9,486	31.91	3	
Greens	8,264	27.79	3	▼1
Independent	4,839	16.27	1	
Independent Labor	4,104	13.81	1	Steady
Campaign for a Better City	1,897	6.38	0	Steady
Socialist Left-Wing Team	1,359	4.57	1	▲1
Socialist Alliance	302	1.02	0	Steady
Total formal votes	29,729	92.06		
Informal votes	2,563	7.94		
Total	32,292	100.0	9	
Registered voters / Turnout	61,407	52.59		

=== Langridge ===
2004 Victorian local elections: Langridge Ward
Party	Candidate	Votes	%	±%
Greens	Jenny Farrar	2,883	30.61	
Labor	Annabel Barbara	2,650	28.14	
Socialist Left-Wing Team	Stephen Jolly	1,162	12.38	
Greens	Sivy Orr	958	10.17	
Labor	Geoff Barbour	711	7.55	
Independent	Dominik Kucera	346	2.67	
Campaign for a Better City	John McPherson	296	3.14	
Independent	Jim Bernard	117	1.24	
Socialist Left-Wing Team	Erinn Sales	109	1.16	
Independent	Alice Tudehope	97	1.03	
Socialist Left-Wing Team	Zac Wright	88	0.93	
Turnout		10,339	52.78	
Greens win		(new ward)		
Labor win		(new ward)		
Socialist Left-Wing Team win		(new ward)		

=== Melba ===
2004 Victorian local elections: Melba Ward
Party	Candidate	Votes	%	±%
Labor	Kay Meadows	2,911	26.99	
Independent Labor	Judy Morton	2,369	21.96	
Greens	Gurm Sekhon	1,778	16.48	
Independent Labor	George Wright	1,735	16.09	
Independent	Ian Quick	1,078	9.99	
Independent	Juliana Viegas-Dias	367	3.40	
Independent	Dale Smedley	260	2.41	
Independent	Matthew Drummond	151	1.40	
Campaign for a Better City	Beth Driscoll	137	1.27	
Turnout		11,779	53.41	
Labor win		(new ward)		
Independent Labor win		(new ward)		
Greens win		(new ward)		

=== Nicholls ===
2004 Victorian local elections: Nicholls Ward
Party	Candidate	Votes	%	±%
Greens	Kathleen Maltzahn	2,645	27.77	
Independent	Jackie Fristacky	2,423	25.44	
Labor	Paul D'Agostino	2,119	22.24	
Campaign for a Better City	Paul Mees	942	9.89	
Labor	Jill Ferguson	600	6.30	
Labor	Glen Kennedy	495	5.20	
Socialist Alliance	Jody Betzien	302	3.17	
Turnout		10,174	51.28	
Greens win		(new ward)		
Independent win		(new ward)		
Labor win		(new ward)		
