= List of mayors of Yarra =

Mayor of Yarra
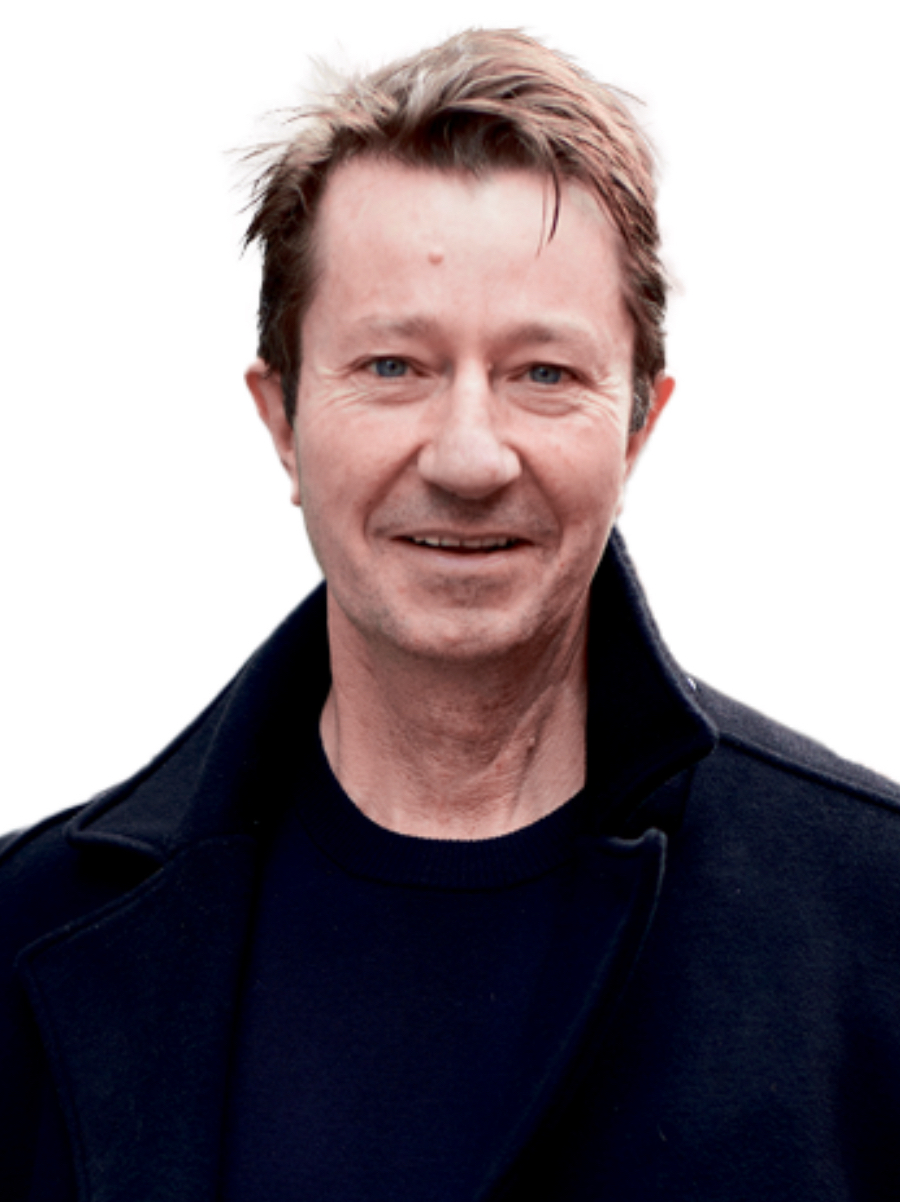
- Incumbent; Stephen Jolly since 19 November 2024
- Appointer: Stephen Jolly
- Term length: 1 year
- Inaugural holder: John Sawyer
- Formation: March 1996
- Deputy: Sarah McKenzie

This is a list of mayors of the City of Yarra, a local government area in Melbourne, Victoria, Australia.

The current mayor is Stephen Jolly, who was voted into the position by councillors on 19 November 2024 following the 2024 local government elections.

== Commissioners ==
=== 1994–1996 ===
Commissioners	Term
Julian Walmsley (Chief Commissioner)	1994–1996
Barbara Champion	1994–1995
Frank Thompson	1994–1996
Carmen Watson	1995–1996

== Mayors ==
=== 1996–present ===
No.	Image	Mayor (Ward)	Party	Term start	Term end	Council control (term)
1		John Sawyer (Carringbush)	Labor	March 1996	March 1997	Labor majority (1996–2002)
2		Linda Hoskins (MacKillop)	Labor	March 1997	March 1998	Labor majority (1996–2002)
3		John Phillips (Nicholson)	Labor	March 1998	March 1999	Labor majority (1996–2002)
4		Steve Watson (MacKillop)	Labor	March 1999	March 2000	Labor majority (1996–2002)
(3)		John Phillips (Nicholson)	Labor	March 2000	March 2001	Labor majority (1996–2002)
5		Sue Corby (Carringbush)	Labor	March 2001	March 2002	Labor majority (1996–2002)
5		Sue Corby (Carringbush)	Labor	March 2002	March 2003	No overall control (2002–2020)
6		Greg Barber (MacKillop)	Greens	March 2003	March 2004	No overall control (2002–2020)
7		Kay Meadows (Docker)	Labor	March 2004	November 2004 (Note: From 1996 until 2004, the annual election of the mayor for the following 12 months occurred in March. New legislation effective from 2004 onwards changed the date of the election of the mayor to November or December. There was a truncated transitional term of office from March to November 2004.)	No overall control (2002–2020)
7		(Melba)	Labor	November 2004	November 2005	No overall control (2002–2020)
8		Jackie Fristacky (Nicholls)	Independent	November 2005	November 2006	No overall control (2002–2020)
9		Jenny Farrar (Langridge)	Greens	November 2006	November 2007	No overall control (2002–2020)
10		Judy Morton (Melba)	Independent Labor	November 2007	November 2008	No overall control (2002–2020)
11		Amanda Stone (Nicholls)	Greens	November 2008	November 2009	No overall control (2002–2020)
12		Jane Garrett (Nicholls)	Labor	November 2009	November 2010	No overall control (2002–2020)
13		Alison Clarke (Melba)	Greens	November 2010	November 2011	No overall control (2002–2020)
14		Geoff Barbour (Langridge)	Labor	November 2011	November 2012	No overall control (2002–2020)
(8)		Jackie Fristacky (Nicholls)	Independent	November 2012	November 2013	No overall control (2002–2020)
(8)		Jackie Fristacky (Nicholls)	Independent	November 2013	November 2014	No overall control (2002–2020)
15		Phillip Vlahogiannis (Melba)	Independent	November 2014	November 2015	No overall control (2002–2020)
16		Roberto Colanzi (Nicholls)	Labor	November 2015	9 November 2016	No overall control (2002–2020)
(11)		Amanda Stone (Langridge)	Greens	9 November 2016	28 November 2017	No overall control (2002–2020)
17		Daniel Nguyen (Melba)	Independent	28 November 2017	27 November 2018	No overall control (2002–2020)
18		Danae Bosler (Langridge)	Labor	27 November 2018	28 November 2019	No overall control (2002–2020)
19		Misha Coleman (Nicholls)	Independent	28 November 2019	17 November 2020	No overall control (2002–2020)
20		Gabrielle de Vietri (Langridge)	Greens	17 November 2020	26 November 2021	Greens majority (2020–2022)
21		Sophie Wade (Nicholls)	Greens	26 November 2021	28 November 2022	Greens majority (2020–2022)
22		Claudia Nguyen (Melba)	Independent	28 November 2022	15 November 2023	No overall control (2022–present)
23		Edward Crossland (Melba)	Greens	15 November 2023	19 November 2024	No overall control (2022–present)
24		Stephen Jolly (MacKillop)	Yarra For All	19 November 2024	incumbent	No overall control (2022–present)

== Deputy mayors ==
The position of Deputy Mayor of Yarra was established in November 2017.

=== 2017–present ===
No.	Image	Deputy Mayor (Ward)	Party	Term start	Term end	Mayor
1		Misha Coleman (Nicholls)	Independent	28 November 2017	27 November 2018	D. Nguyen (Independent)
1		Misha Coleman (Nicholls)	Independent	27 November 2018	28 November 2019	Bosler (Labor)
2		Mi-Lin Chen Yi Mei (Melba)	Labor	28 November 2019	17 November 2020	Coleman (Independent)
3		Claudia Nguyen (Melba)	Independent	17 November 2020	26 November 2021	De Vietri (Greens)
4		Edward Crossland (Melba)	Greens	26 November 2021	28 November 2022	Wade (Greens)
4		Edward Crossland (Melba)	Greens	28 November 2022	15 November 2023	C. Nguyen (Independent)
5		Anab Mohamud (Langridge)	Greens	15 November 2023	27 February 2024	Crossland (Greens)
		Anab Mohamud (Langridge)	Independent	27 February 2024	19 November 2024	Crossland (Greens)
6		Sarah McKenzie (Yarra Bend)	Labor	26 November 2024	11 November 2025	Jolly (Yarra For All)
7		Sharon Harrison (Boulevard)	Yarra For All	11 November 2025	incumbent	Jolly (Yarra For All)

== See also ==
- List of mayors of Fitzroy
- List of mayors of Collingwood
- List of mayors of Richmond
