= 2004 Victorian local elections =

Local elections in Australia

- 26 November 2004
- Registered: 800,000+
- Turnout: 71.1%

| | First party | Second party | Third party |
|---|---|---|---|
| | IND |
| Leader | N/A | N/A | No leader |
| Party | Independents | Labor | Greens |
| Last election | (Note: This only includes the 22 councils up for election in 2004, not councillors in the remaining 57 councils.) | | 4 |
| Seats before | | | 4 |
| Seats won | 159 | 22 | 6 |
| Seats after | | | 10 |
| Seat change | | | ▲2 |
| Popular vote | 606,598 | 78,241 | 21,995 |
| Percentage | 76.92% | 9.92% | 2.79% |
| | Fourth party | Fifth party | Sixth party |
| | | SA | DLP |
| Leader | N/A | No leader | No leader |
| Party | Liberal | Socialist Alliance | Democratic Labour |
| Last election | 8 | 0 | 0 |
| Seats before | | 0 | 0 |
| Seats won | 9 | 0 | 1 |
| Seat change | | Steady | ▲1 |
| Popular vote | 21,686 | 5,512 | 4,378 |
| Percentage | 2.75% | 0.70% | 0.56% |
| | Seventh party |
| | SOC |
| Leader | No leader |
| Party | Socialist |
| Last election | 0 |
| Seats before | 0 |
| Seats won | 1 |
| Seat change | ▲1 |
| Popular vote | 1,359 |
| Percentage | 0.17% |
| Swing | ▼0.02 |

The 2004 Victorian local elections were held on 26 November 2004 to elect the councils of 22 of the 79 local government areas in Victoria, Australia.

Until 2008, local elections in Victoria were conducted periodically, meaning 54 councils were not up for election in 2004. An additional three LGAs that were scheduled to vote in 2004 also did not have elections.

A shift away from single-member wards in favour of multi-member wards began in 2004, in particular in the Greater Melbourne area.

The election in Yarra saw the first-ever victory for the Socialist Party, with Stephen Jolly elected in Langridge Ward. He was reportedly the first elected socialist councillor in Melbourne "since the Second World War".

In Melbourne, Labor Party members ran on a ticket called 'Active Local Progressive' (ALP), led by Raymond Collins.

== Party changes before elections ==
A number of councillors joined or left parties before the 2004 elections.

| Council | Ward | Councillor | Former party | New party | Date |
|---|---|---|---|---|---|
| Melbourne | Unsubdivided | Kevin Chamberlin | Labor | Independent | 7 November 2002 |
| Melbourne | Unsubdivided | Kevin Chamberlin | Independent | Kevin Chamberlin For Melbourne | 2004 |

== Results ==
| Party | Votes | % | Swing | Seats | Change |
|---|---|---|---|---|---|
| Independents | 606,598 | 76.92 | | 159 | |
| Labor | 78,241 | 9.92 | | 22 | |
| Greens | 21,995 | 2.79 | | 6 | ▲2 |
| Liberal | 21,686 | 2.75 | | 9 | |
| Melbourne Living | 18,155 | 2.30 | | 3 | |
| Socialist Alliance | 5,512 | 0.70 | | 0 | Steady |
| Democratic Labour | 4,378 | 0.56 | | 1 | ▲1 |
| Independent Labor | 4,637 | 0.59 | | 1 | |
| Kevin Chamberlin For Melbourne | 3,297 | 0.42 | | 0 | |
| Melbourne Civic Group | 3,018 | 0.38 | | 1 | |
| Advance Melbourne | 2,742 | 0.35 | | 1 | |
| Serving Melbourne | 2,335 | 0.30 | | 1 | |
| Residents First - Stop The Rates Ripoff | 2,210 | 0.28 | | 0 | |
| Melbourne First | 1,454 | 0.18 | | 0 | |
| Active Local Progressive | 1,441 | 0.18 | | 0 | |
| Campaign for a Better City | 1,375 | 0.17 | | 0 | Steady |
| Socialist Left-Wing Team | 1,359 | 0.17 | | 1 | ▲1 |
| Melbourne: Building An Even Better City | 1,261 | 0.16 | | 0 | |
| Melbourne At Work | 904 | 0.12 | | 0 | |
| Melbourne Matters | 860 | 0.11 | | 0 | |
| Sue Chambers Act Local Team | 822 | 0.11 | | 0 | |
| Growing Melbourne | 777 | 0.10 | | 0 | |
| Melbourne Arts Fashion Design Innovation | 777 | 0.10 | | 0 | |
| Transparency And Accountability | 724 | 0.09 | | 0 | |
| !ST@ND UP 4 MELBOURNE! | 555 | 0.07 | | 0 | |
| Strengthen Melbourne | 493 | 0.06 | | 0 | |
| Evolving Melbourne | 394 | 0.05 | | 0 | |
| Save Our Streets | 332 | 0.04 | | 0 | |
| Sustainable City | 231 | 0.03 | | 0 | |
| Total | 788,563 | 100.0 | | 204 | |
| Informal votes | | | | | |
| Turnout | | | | | |

=== Council control ===
| Party | Councils | |
| Party | Number | Change |
|---|---|---|
| Independent | 17 | |
| No overall control | 2 | |
| Labor | 2 | |
| Melbourne Living | 1 | |
