= The Socialist =

The Socialist may refer to:

- The Socialist, the newspaper of the Socialist Party (England and Wales), from 1997
- The Socialist (Irish newspaper), from the 1990s
- The Socialist (Australian magazine), until 2021
- The Socialist (Australian newspaper), 1906–1923
- The Socialist (SLP newspaper), in Great Britain, 1901 – c. 1923
- The Socialist, published by Hermon F. Titus 1900–1910
- The Socialist, published by the Workers' Socialist Party 1929–1938
- The Socialist, published by the Revolutionary Socialists (Egypt) since 1995
