= List of mayors of Collingwood =

This is a list of mayors and chairmen of the City of Collingwood, a former local government area in Melbourne, Victoria, Australia and its precedents. It existed from 1855 until 1994 when it merged with the City of Fitzroy and City of Richmond to form the new City of Yarra.

== Council name ==
Name	Established
Collingwood Municipality	24 April 1855
Collingwood Borough Council	1863
Collingwood Town Council	21 April 1873
Collingwood City Council	14 January 1876

== Chairmen (1855–1876) ==
#	Chairman	Term
1	1855	F Murphy
2	1856	A Carnie T T A’Beckett
3	1857	T T A’Beckett
4	1858	T T A’Beckett
5	1859	T Cope
6	1860	S Turner & T Greenwood
7	1861	J Noone
8	1862	J G Reeves
9	1863	T Greenwood
10	1864	T Greenwood
11	1865	T Miles
12	1866	J Noone
13	1867	G D Langridge
14	1868	S Baynham
15	1869	J Bowring
16	1870	J H Turner
17	1871	J Eade
18	1872	G D Langridge
19	1873	H Walker
20	1874	W Kidney
21	1875	H Walker & C Morgan

== Mayor (1876–1994) ==
#	Mayor	Term
1	W Smith	1876–1877
2	J H Turner	1877–1878
3	Henry Walker	1878–1879
4	T Peter	1879–1880
5	Henry Walker	1880–1881
6	W G Field	1881–1882
6	M Dwyer	1882–1884
7	J Stanton	1884–1885
8	W Gray	1885–1886
9	A Aitken	1886–1887
10	H Walker	1887–1888
11	W D Holgate	1888–1889
12	W Keele	1889–1890
13	William Pitt	1890–1891
14	E Wilkins	1891–1892
15	M L Kreitmayer	1892–1893
16	Jno Gahan	1893–1894
17	William Beazley	1894–1895
18	J E Kimberley	1895–1896
19	W Cody	1896–1897
20	E Wilkins	1897–1899
21	William Beazley	1899–1901
22	Clifton Wheat Smith Aumont	1901–1902
23	Jno Gahan	1902–1904
24	W Rain	1904–1905
25	J Cornfoot	1905–1906
26	R W Dyer	1906–1907
27	E Coulson	1907–1908
28	H Evans	1908–1909
29	Jabez Coon	1909–1910
30	H S Trevena	1910–1911
31	A C Wright	1911–1912
32	A Collins	1912–1913
33	T Luxford	1913–1914
34	E J Brown	1914–1915
35	P J McNamara	1915–1916
36	A M Davidson	1916–1917
37	B W Tapner	1917–1918
38	J R Reid	1918–1919
39	W E Marshall	1919–1920
40	A S Young	1920–1921
41	W G Amos	1921–1922
42	A Pollock	1922–1923
43	J Tonini	1923–1924
44	T Harper	1924–1925
45	F A Revell	1925–1926
46	T J Kane	1926–1927
47	C T Tunaley	1927–1928
48	A J Dunkin	1928–1929
49	W F Angus	1929–1930
50	J G Eastman	1930–1931
51	W F Angus	1931–1932
52	R McHugh	1932–1933
53	R Roberts	1933–1934
54	M Nugent	1934–1935
55	F A Andrews	1935–1936
56	L Marshall	1936–1937
57	J W Smith	1937–1938
58	A B Maynard	1938–1939
59	Bill Towers	1939–1940
60	W F Angus	1940–1941
61	M Seddon	1941–1942
62	F A Andrews	1942–1943
63	Bill Towers	1943–1945
64	William Ruthven	1945–1946
65	R L Friend	1946–1948
66	W H Reid	1948–1949
67	W A Jupp	1949–1950
68	W Johnstone	1950–1951
69	G I Maxwell	1951–1952
70	L J Ryan	1952–1953
71	W H Reid	1953–1954
72	W A Livy	1954–1955
73	H M Geddes	1955–1956
74	H F Dummett	1956–1957
75	Dolph Eddy	1957–1958
76	J H Sleep	1958–1959
77	L R Reed	1959–1960
78	Horrie Garrick	1960–1961
79	T H Marshall	1961–1962
80	C R Barrett	1962–1963
81	George Knott	1963–1964
82	S Winter	1964–1965
83	G H Pearce	1965–1966
84	V Cantwell	1966–1967
85	Dolph Eddy	1967–1968
86	Horrie Garrick	1968–1969
87	T H Marshall	1969–1970
88	G C Cain	1970–1971
89	J P Brebner	1971–1973
90	E H Jell	1973–1974
91	Ray L Coverdale	1974 -1975
92	Andrew McCutcheon	1975–1976
93	Charlie Utting	1976–1977
94	Theo Sidiropoulos	1977–1978
95	Caroline Hogg	1978–1979
96	F R Thompson	1979–1980
97	S M D Shapiro	1980–1981
98	P M Jackson	1981–1982
99	A G Just	1982–1983
100	T A Scheikowski	1983– 1984
101	P G Jenkins	1984–1985
102	Graeme Russell	1985–1986
103	G Georgoulos	1986–1987
104	J Backholer	1987–1988
105	R E Frew	1988–1989
106	A G Just	1989–1990
107	W R Hampson	1990–1991
108	M J Fleet	1991–1992
109	D M Meier	1992–1993
110	N L Moore	1993–1994

== See also ==
- List of mayors of Fitzroy
- List of mayors of Richmond
