= List of mayors of Fitzroy =

This is a list of mayors and chairmen of the City of Fitzroy, a former local government area in Melbourne, Victoria, Australia and its precedents. It existed from 1858 until 1994 when it merged with the City of Collingwood and City of Richmond to form the new City of Yarra.

== Council name ==
Name	Established
Fitzroy Municipality	10 September 1858
Fitzroy Borough Council	1 October 1865
Fitzroy Town Council	3 December 1870
Fitzroy City Council	1 February 1878

== Chairman (1856-1862) ==
#	Chairman	Term
1	G Symons	1858
2	E Langton	1858–1859
3	C Vaughan	1859–1860
4	J Edwards	1860–1861
5	J R Brennand	1861–1862

== Mayors (1862-1994) ==
#	Mayor	Term
6	C Vaughan	1862–1863
7	J Falconer	1863–1865
8	J Ford Born	1865–1866
9	E Delbridge	1866–1867
10	J Michael	1867–1868
11	G Rushall	1868–1869
12	T Rowe	1869–1870
13	A Grant	1870–1871
14	Albert Edwin Elworthy Lee Tucker	1871–1972
15	E Delbridge	1872–1873
16	T A Ewing	1873–1874
17	H Kneen	1874–1875
18	D Mahony	1875–1876
19	S Lyons	1876–1877
20	R Showers	1877–1878
21	Albert Edwin Elworthy Lee Tucker	1878–1879
22	F W Tinsley Evans	1879–1880
23	J Mcmahon	1880–1881
24	J Holden	1881–1882
25	J Moore	1882–1883
26	E Brooks	1883–1884
27	W R Bennetts	1884–1885
28	F J Britten	1885–1886
29	G C Clauscen	1886–1887
30	J Grigg	1887–1888
31	Robert Wallace Best	1888–1889
32	W Smithers Gadd	1889–1890
33	C T Crispe	1890–1891
34	J McMahon	1891–1892
35	J Grayson	1892–1893
36	John G. Yager	1893–1894
37	H G Burrell	1894–1895
38	A Renfrew	1895–1897
39	W Rawling Bennetts	1897–1898
40	J J Denton	1898–1899
41	M Gross	1899–1900
42	A Wheeler	1900–1901
43	R Barr	1901–1903
44	A A Mcnair	1903–1904
45	T W Delves	1904–1905
46	G Rutherford Jeffries	1905–1906
47	W Collings	1906–1907
48	J L Snadden	1907–1908
49	F R Chapman	1908–1909
50	S F Galagher	1909–1910
51	D Reddan	1910–1911
52	T Mcmahen	1911–1912
53	C Ottery	1912–1913
54	C C Lewis	1913–1914
55	J A Boell	1914–1915
56	E T Apps	1915–1916
57	W F L Langdon	1916–1917
58	A Fraser	1917–1918
59	R Barr	1918–1919
60	C E Miller	1919–1920
61	W J Beckett	1920–1921
62	J A Boell	1921–1922
63	G H Green	1922–1923
64	J A Boell	1923–1924
65	W J Beckett	1924–1925
66	A Rosen	1925–1926
67	T M Foley	1926–1927
68	E T Apps	1927–1928
69	T M Foley	1928–1929
70	P Lucini	1929–1930
71	S Rosen	1930–1931
72	E T Apps	1931–1932
73	J E Kerr	1932–1933
74	J T Foley	1933–1934
75	J J Barrett	1934–1935
76	I R Dabscheck	1935–1936
77	A J Matthews	1936–1937
78	J E Kerr	1937–1939
79	K Parlon	1939–1941
80	W E Beckett	1941–1943
81	J T Ryan	1943–1944
82	K Parlon	1944–1945
83	W J Moran	1953–1954
84	J E Kerr	1945–1946
85	H D O'halloran	1946–1947
86	H L Peel	1947–1948
87	R Solomons	1948–1949
88	F P Mcmahon	1949–1950
89	S R Anderson	1950–1951
90	F J Caddy	1951–1952
91	Joe Smith	1952–1953
92	K Parlon	1953–1954
93	W J Donovan	1954–1955
94	W H Underwood	1955–1956
95	C W Bird	1956–1957
96	J G Black	1957–1958
97	J E Blackman	1958–1959
98	J H Jamieson	1959–1960
99	E J James	1960–1961
100	L J Martin	1961–1962
101	J G Black	1962–1963
102	Florence E Peel	1963–1964
103	J W Byrne	1964–1965
104	N G Porter	1965–1966
105	P P Prendergast	1966–1967
106	J H Jamieson	1967–1968
107	L J Martin	1968–1969
108	J W Byrne	1969–1970
109	A R Anderson	1970–1971
110	Eileen J Wheeler	1971–1972
111	W T Peterson	1972–1973
112	E R Rush	1973–1974
113	P A Coghlan	1974–1975
114	L P Patford	1975–1976
115	Jennifer A Miller	1976–1977
116	W T Peterson	1977–1978
117	L Sotiriadis	1978–1979
118	J T Harding	1979–1980
119	W F Berryman	1980–1981
120	H G Mackrell	1981–1982
121	T Marino	1982–1983
122	K Lumley	1983–1984
123	R M R Mclean	1984–1985
124	P J Burfurd	1985–1987
125	G L Millman	1987–1988
126	Heather L Blakey	1988–1989
127	G L Millman	1989–1990
128	D C Reilly	1990–1991
129	Angela C Ireland	1991–1992
130	Mike Zafiropoulos	1992–1993
131	S J Blackie	1993–1994

== See also ==
- List of mayors of Richmond
- List of mayors of Collingwood
