= List of mayors of Richmond =

This is a list of mayors and chairmen of the City of Richmond, a former local government area in Melbourne, Victoria, Australia and its precedents. It existed from 1855 until 1994 when it merged with the City of Collingwood and City of Fitzroy to form the new City of Yarra.

== Council name ==
| Name | Established |
|---|---|
| Richmond Municipality | 24 April 1855 |
| Richmond Town Council | 28 September 1872 |
| Richmond City Council | 17 February 1882 |

== Officeholders ==
The following individuals have served as chairmen or mayors of Richmond:

| Ordinal | Officeholder | Title | Term | Notes |
|---|---|---|---|---|
| 1 | Henry Miller | Chairman of Richmond Municipality | 1856–1858 | |
| 2 | Philip Johnson | Chairman of Richmond Municipality | 1858–1859 | |
| 3 | G Coppin | Chairman of Richmond Municipality | 1859–1861 | |
| 4 | J Russell | Chairman of Richmond Municipality | 1861–1862 | |
| (2) | Philip Johnson | Mayor of Richmond Municipality | 1862–1863 | |
| 5 | Hutton Oddy | Mayor of Richmond Municipality | 1863–1864 | |
| 6 | Joseph Bosisto | Mayor of Richmond Municipality | 1864–1866 | |
| 7 | Joseph Griffiths | Mayor of Richmond Municipality | 1866–1867 | |
| 8 | Cornelius Stewart | Mayor of Richmond Municipality | 1867–1868 | |
| 9 | Michael Egan | Mayor of Richmond Municipality | 1868–1869 | |
| 10 | James Hosie | Mayor of Richmond Municipality | 1869–1870 | |
| 11 | William Gleadell | Mayor of Richmond Municipality | 1870–1871 | |
| 12 | William Wallace Shelley | Mayor of Richmond Municipality | 1871–1872 | |
| 13 | Henry Farmer | Mayor of Richmond Town Council | 1872–1873 | |
| 14 | Charles Smith | Mayor of Richmond Town Council | 1873–1875 | |
| (11) | William Gleadell | Mayor of Richmond Town Council | 1875–1876 | |
| 15 | Thomas Edward Weaver | Mayor of Richmond Town Council | 1877–1878 | |
| 16 | J F Lancashire | Mayor of Richmond Town Council | 1879–1880 | |
| 17 | Samuel Hartley Roberts | Mayor of Richmond Town Council | 1880–1881 | |
| 18 | Samuel Vincent Winter | Mayor of Richmond Town Council | 1881–1882 | |
| 19 | John A. B. Koch | Mayor of Richmond City Council | 1882–1883 | |
| 20 | John Adam | Mayor of Richmond City Council | 1883–1884 | |
| 21 | John C. Winn | Mayor of Richmond City Council | 1884–1885 | |
| 22 | John McRae | Mayor of Richmond City Council | 1885–1886 | |
| 23 | George Henry Bennett | Mayor of Richmond City Council | 1886–1887 | |
| 24 | W Davison | Mayor of Richmond City Council | 1887–1888 | |
| 25 | John Shanks Jenkins | Mayor of Richmond City Council | 1888–1889 | |
| 26 | Nathaniel Kingston | Mayor of Richmond City Council | 1889–1890 | |
| 27 | W Weatherill | Mayor of Richmond City Council | 1890–1891 | |
| 28 | W A Webb | Mayor of Richmond City Council | 1891–1892 | |
| 29 | George William Freeman | Mayor of Richmond City Council | 1892–1893 | |
| 30 | Charles J. Jago | Mayor of Richmond City Council | 1893–1895 | |
| 31 | Simeon Nathan | Mayor of Richmond City Council | 1895–1896 | |
| 32 | Patrick O'Connor | Mayor of Richmond City Council | 1896–1897 | |
| 33 | Edward White | Mayor of Richmond City Council | 1897–1898 | |
| 34 | J H Sheedy | Mayor of Richmond City Council | 1898–1900 | |
| 35 | Samuel J. Willis | Mayor of Richmond City Council | 1900–1901 | |
| (30) | Charles J. Jago | Mayor of Richmond City Council | 1901–1902 | |
| 36 | George R. Admans | Mayor of Richmond City Council | 1902–1903 | |
| 37 | Edwin Crawcour | Mayor of Richmond City Council | 1903–1904 | |
| 38 | George Laity | Mayor of Richmond City Council | 1904–1905 | |
| 39 | George Frederick Aloysius Jones | Mayor of Richmond City Council | 1905–1906 | |
| 40 | Moses Alexander | Mayor of Richmond City Council | 1906–1907 | |
| (29) | George William Freeman | Mayor of Richmond City Council | 1907–1909 | |
| (39) | George Frederick Aloysius Jones | Mayor of Richmond City Council | 1909–1910 | |
| 41 | David Lloyd Davies | Mayor of Richmond City Council | 1910–1911 | |
| (40) | Moses Alexander | Mayor of Richmond City Council | 1911–1913 | |
| (36) | George R. Admans | Mayor of Richmond City Council | 1912–1913 | |
| 42 | Gordon Webber | Mayor of Richmond City Council | 1913–1915 | |
| 43 | Arthur Frederick Fear | Mayor of Richmond City Council | 1915–1917 | |
| 44 | Harry Palling | Mayor of Richmond City Council | 1917–1918 | |
| 45 | Hector Jacob Barcelo | Mayor of Richmond City Council | 1918–1920 | |
| 46 | J H Robinson | Mayor of Richmond City Council | 1920–1922 | |
| (43) | Arthur Frederick Fear | Mayor of Richmond City Council | 1922–1923 | |
| 47 | M D Kennedy | Mayor of Richmond City Council | 1923–1924 | |
| 48 | Alfred C. Mitchell | Mayor of Richmond City Council | 1924–1925 | |
| 49 | Geoffrey Daniel O'Connell | Mayor of Richmond City Council | 1925–1927 | |
| 50 | D J Murphy | Mayor of Richmond City Council | 1927–1928 | |
| 51 | Bert Cremean | Mayor of Richmond City Council | 1928–1929 | |
| 52 | Richard Henry Lightfoot | Mayor of Richmond City Council | 1929–1930 | |
| (48) | Alfred C. Mitchell | Mayor of Richmond City Council | 1930–1931 | |
| 53 | Hugh Davine | Mayor of Richmond City Council | 1931–1932 | |
| 54 | Cornelius Anthony (Con) Loughnan | Mayor of Richmond City Council | 1932–1933 | |
| 55 | C Fitzgerald | Mayor of Richmond City Council | 1933–1934 | |
| 56 | W Williams | Mayor of Richmond City Council | 1934–1935 | |
| 57 | P F Donnelly | Mayor of Richmond City Council | 1935–1936 | |
| 58 | A E Huckerby | Mayor of Richmond City Council | 1936–1937 | |
| 59 | James Loughnan | Mayor of Richmond City Council | 1937–1938 | |
| 60 | Paul J. Carroll | Mayor of Richmond City Council | 1938–1939 | |
| (52) | Richard Henry Lightfoot | Mayor of Richmond City Council | 1939–1940 | |
| 61 | D L Murphy | Mayor of Richmond City Council | 1940–1941 | |
| 62 | Patrick Sheehy | Mayor of Richmond City Council | 1941–1942 | |
| 63 | Ernest Patrick (Ern) Boland | Mayor of Richmond City Council | 1942–1943 | |
| (59) | James Loughnan | Mayor of Richmond City Council | 1943–1945 | |
| (61) | D L Murphy | Mayor of Richmond City Council | 1945–1946 | |
| 64 | Paul J. Carroll | Mayor of Richmond City Council | 1946–1947 | |
| 65 | R S Jackson | Mayor of Richmond City Council | 1947–1948 | |
| 66 | W Williams | Mayor of Richmond City Council | 1948–1949 | |
| 67 | P V O'Connell | Mayor of Richmond City Council | 1949–1950 | |
| 68 | Tom Bolger | Mayor of Richmond City Council | 1950–1951 | |
| 69 | Patrick Sheehy | Mayor of Richmond City Council | 1951–1952 | |
| 70 | Gus Coloretti | Mayor of Richmond City Council | 1952–1953 | |
| 71 | W J Moran | Mayor of Richmond City Council | 1953–1954 | |
| 72 | F R McFarlane | Mayor of Richmond City Council | 1954–1955 | |
| 73 | J R Andrews | Mayor of Richmond City Council | 1955–1956 | |
| 74 | H E Tye | Mayor of Richmond City Council | 1956–1957 | |
| 75 | Jack O'Connell | Mayor of Richmond City Council | 1957–1958 | |
| 76 | David Langdon | Mayor of Richmond City Council | 1958–1959 | |
| 77 | A Bain | Mayor of Richmond City Council | 1959–1960 | |
| 78 | David Lewis | Mayor of Richmond City Council | 1960–1961 | |
| 79 | A Price | Mayor of Richmond City Council | 1961–1962 | |
| 80 | P O'Connell | Mayor of Richmond City Council | 1962–1963 | |
| (59) | James Loughnan | Mayor of Richmond City Council | 1963–1964 | |
| (75) | Jack O'Connell | Mayor of Richmond City Council | 1964–1965 | |
| 81 | C T McGrath | Mayor of Richmond City Council | 1965–1966 | |
| 82 | Maurice Costello | Mayor of Richmond City Council | 1966–1967 | |
| 83 | Tom Peluso | Mayor of Richmond City Council | 1967–1968 | |
| 84 | C W Evans | Mayor of Richmond City Council | 1967–1968 | |
| 85 | A J Brown | Mayor of Richmond City Council | 1968–1969 | |
| (76) | David Langdon | Mayor of Richmond City Council | 1969–1970 | |
| (78) | David Lewis | Mayor of Richmond City Council | 1970–1971 | |
| 86 | F J Johnson | Mayor of Richmond City Council | 1971–1972 | |
| 87 | C A Evans | Mayor of Richmond City Council | 1972–1973 | |
| (59) | James Loughnan | Mayor of Richmond City Council | 1973–1974 | |
| 88 | Ernest Bastow | Mayor of Richmond City Council | 1974–1975 | |
| 89 | H E Fletcher | Mayor of Richmond City Council | 1975–1976 | |
| 90 | F R Smith | Mayor of Richmond City Council | 1976–1977 | |
| 91 | Charles Farquhar | Mayor of Richmond City Council | 1977–1978 | |
| 92 | Geoff O'Connell | Mayor of Richmond City Council | 1978–1979 | |
| (90) | F R Smith | Mayor of Richmond City Council | 1979–1980 | |
| (92) | Geoff O'Connell | Mayor of Richmond City Council | 1980–1982 | |
| − | Alex Gillon | Commissioner of Richmond City Council | 1982–1988 | The Victorian Government sacked the entire Richmond Council in 1982 following a report that revealed allegations of electoral malpractice and fraud. The government appointed a commissioner to administer the city until an elected Council was restored in 1988. |
| 93 | Malcolm Graham | Mayor of Richmond City Council | 1988–1989 | |
| 94 | Jack Softley | Mayor of Richmond City Council | 1989–1990 | |
| 95 | Maureen Breen | Mayor of Richmond City Council | 1990–1991 | |
| 96 | Sang Nguyen | Mayor of Richmond City Council | 1991–1992 | |
| 97 | Rosemary Mason | Mayor of Richmond City Council | 1992–1993 | |
| (95) | Maureen Breen | Mayor of Richmond City Council | 1993–1994 | |

== See also ==
- Richmond Town Hall, Melbourne
- List of mayors of Collingwood
- List of mayors of Fitzroy
