= The Socialist (Australian magazine) =

- Type: Monthly magazine
- Format: Magazine
- Owner: Socialist Action
- Publisher: Socialist Action
- Editor: Socialist Action National Committee
- Founded: 2000
- Political alignment: Socialist Action
- Language: English
- Headquarters: Melbourne, Australia
- ISSN: 2206-320X
- Website: thesocialist.org.au

The Socialist was the official publication of Socialist Action, formerly the Australian affiliate of the International Socialist Alternative (ISA). It became defunct around 2020–2021 as Socialist Action was wound down after allegations of rape against a number of leading members.

== History and overview ==
Socialist Action was formally known as The Militant and published a newspaper by the same name. After The Militant changed its name to the Socialist Party, it published a newspaper called The Voice, before publishing The Socialist as an eight-page broadsheet. In May 2012, the format of The Socialist was changed to a magazine and it was published in that format until 2020. It has no relation to the publication formally produced by the Victorian Socialist Party during the early 20th century.

The Socialist described itself as providing political analysis of events in Australia and internationally from a socialist perspective. It covered issues ranging from workers' rights and the environment to international affairs and political commentary.

It was edited and written by the members and supporters of the political party publishing it. It was a non-profit paper, carrying news and reports from around the country and from overseas.

The masthead of The Socialist was trademark registered and protected.
