= Socialist Action (Australia) =

- Leader: Collective Leadership (National Committee)
- Founded: 1985 (as Militant)
- Dissolved: 2022
- Headquarters: Victorian Trades Hall, Melbourne
- Newspaper: The Socialist
- Ideology: Revolutionary socialism Marxism; Trotskyism
- Political position: Far-left
- International affiliation: International Standpoint
- Colours: Red
- City of Yarra: 2 / 9 (2011–2012)

Website
- https://thesocialist.org.au

Socialist Action, known until October 2019 as the Socialist Party, was a Trotskyist political party in Australia. It published a monthly magazine called The Socialist which contained a socialist perspective on news and current issues.

== History ==
The Socialist Party (Australia) traced its origins to the British Trotyskyist Militant group (now Socialist Party (England and Wales)) which organized within the UK Labour Party. It began in 1985 as a small faction within the Australian Labor Party (ALP), when members who had lived in Britain and become members of British Militant returned to Australia to help build an Australian section of the organisation.

The group was originally known as Militant. At that time the ALP was seen by Militant as having "maintained its internal democracy and its active working class membership base", and so they participated politically within that party. They organised primarily within the New South Wales trade union movement and Young Labor (the youth wing of the ALP). At one point, Militant had control of three Young Labor branches.

During the early 1990s when the ALP and most social democratic parties internationally moved to the right, and after other Marxist groups (including their sister party British Militant) were expelled by Labour parties overseas, Militant left the ALP. They wrote that by that stage it had "played a key role in the introduction of neo-liberal policies and no longer has democratic structures that ensure workers interests are represented".

After leaving the ALP, the group became known as the Militant Socialist Organisation before becoming the Socialist Party in line with its counterpart in the UK (in 1996 the unrelated group that used to be called the "Socialist Party of Australia" from 1971 changed its name). The name of the organisation's monthly newspaper was changed from The Voice to The Socialist. In May 2012, the eight-page broadsheet format was changed to a longer magazine format.

From 2011 to 2016, SP had two branches in Victoria: city and northern. It reverted to a single branch in March 2016. SP argued for revolutionary socialist politics, while also participating in election campaigns - federal, state and local council. Stephen Jolly was elected to City of Yarra council in 2004. Anthony Main became SP's second councilor in January 2011, filling a vacancy created by the election of Jane Garrett to the seat of Brunswick. It argued for the establishment of a new 'mass worker's party' to replace the ALP, based on trade unionism, community participation and a democratic membership.

== Sexual abuse scandals ==
On 22 February 2016, 10 members of the SP, including City of Yarra Councillor Stephen Jolly, announced their resignation from the group, claiming that the group was "torn apart by attacks on a woman comrade for coming forward with serious allegations of abuse". They eventually formed a separate group, The Socialists. The Socialist Party denied any cover-up.

In October 2019, the Socialist Party renamed itself Socialist Action. In 2020, new allegations of rape appeared against the same member accused in 2016. In 2021, their international organisation, International Socialist Alternative (ISA), objected to an alleged 18-month long pattern of harassment of his alleged victim and their supporters within the party. ISA also objected to a financial payment of $32,000 AUD from Socialist Action to the man accused after he resigned working for the party. In response, Socialist Action formally split from ISA. They announced a plan to collaborate with Taiwanese group International Socialist Forward. Their website is no longer active and they have no phone or office address. Those members who opposed Socialist Action's stance on sexual assault remained members of the ISA and founded a new section of ISA in Australia in April 2021.

== Campaigns ==
The Socialist Party was involved in a range of campaigns. In 1993, members of Militant were heavily involved in a year-long occupation of Richmond Secondary College in an attempt to prevent the school from being closed. This campaign was partially successful, as the schoolgrounds have been maintained as Melbourne Girls College. Militant played a prominent role in campaigns against right-leaning state governments in Victoria and New South Wales during this period.

Socialist Party helped to initiate the Community Campaign for Heroin Reform, and continues to campaign for the establishment of safe injecting facilities.

It was also involved in the campaign for the rights of refugees, including participation in the Woomera Detention Centre protests, and was involved in the anti-globalisation and anti-war movements. Along with a range of other left groups, they also had a presence at the Occupy Melbourne protests. Members often participate in larger protests, including events such as Melbourne's annual St Kilda Gay Pride March and May Day rallies. SP has played a role helping to organise left-wing and youth movements against far-right organisations, including the One Nation political party. In Perth, the party has helped to launch the West Australians Against Racism campaign (WAAR).

In 2003 SP initiated a campaign for young casual workers' rights called Unite, which subsequently became established as Unite Union. In 2012 they initiated a broad campaign over cost-of-living issues in Australia, known as "Fightback!". The campaign has focused on issues such as free public transport, opposition to TAFE funding cuts, and opposition to cuts on university campuses.

After 2004 they played a prominent role in local council politics in the Yarra area of Melbourne (see below). SP encouraged the formation of resident's organisations on housing estates. From 2011 to 2013, they initiated a campaign with public housing tenants to oppose the sale of land allocated for public housing in Yarra.

On Christmas Eve 2012, the Victorian State Government announced plans to privatise parts of the public housing developments in Fitzroy, Richmond and Prahran, aiming to provide an equal mix of public and private housing by building private developments on parkland used by public housing residents. The SP initiated the "Hands Off Melbourne's Estates" (HOME) campaign with public housing residents, organising a rally on 24 March 2013 and meeting with the Trades Hall Building Industry Group to secure union support for the campaign. Shortly before the rally, the State Government announced its intention to back down from development on the Fitzroy and Richmond estates, where the campaign was most organised. They have yet to back down on plans for the Petty Horace estate in Prahran.

The Socialist Party has a history of involvement in the opposition to the East-West Tunnel, a proposed infrastructure project in Melbourne's north that involves building a road tunnel ostensibly to ease congestion. The project has come under substantial criticism from many sources since its inception, and the government has been slow in releasing information on the full nature of the project. The Socialist Party holds the position that the tunnel "is not about making the lives of ordinary people easier" but is "about serving the needs of the big transport companies", and they contend that it will not substantially ease traffic congestion, but will divert funds from public transport as well as causing damage to the areas through which the tunnel will be built. They instead support the expansion and improvement of public transport to improve service to Melbourne's outer suburbs and to reduce congestion.

In early 2013 the Socialist Party initiated a pledge campaign to canvass support for community action against the construction of the tunnel, and a series of pickets were initiated in the Yarra area and Melbourne's CBD. These were aimed at delaying and preventing test drilling for the tunnel project and at picketing the offices of Leighton Holdings subsidiaries John Holland (one of the reported contenders for the tunnel construction contract) and the Victorian Government's Linking Melbourne Authority (LMA). This led to the LMA abandoning work on the final drill sites in October 2013, only to make another series of attempts from 16 December. Further community pickets successfully blocked work on the drill sites in subsequent days and the drilling was abandoned a second time. In March 2014, test drilling was restarted and abandoned a third time, leaving nine planned drill holes yet to be completed, four months behind the initial intended deadline. The picket campaign has received substantial media attention in Melbourne, with media outlets accused of demonising and misrepresenting the protestors.

Pressure from the tunnel's opposition led to the ALP publicly reversing their position on the tunnel project ahead of the 2014 state elections, and the opposition to the tunnel was credited as a key factor in the November 2014 electoral defeat of the incumbent Liberal state government.

In early 2015, the Socialist Party initiated the No Room For Racism campaign. In Melbourne, they organised large counter-demonstrations of 3–4 thousand people against the newly formed right-wing group Reclaim Australia in April and July 2015. Following the dissolution of Reclaim Australia into separate organisations, the Richmond Town Hall became the target of an anti-Islamic rally held by the United Patriots Front due to the SP having an elected local councilor in Yarra, although the town hall building was empty during this rally and the party was holding a forum to develop the No Room For Racism campaign in the CBD at the time.

SP periodically raised money for various international fundraising appeals, in 2010 providing assistance after the Pakistan floods, in early 2012 providing assistance to Campaign Kazakhstan and in 2013 providing support towards the formation of the Workers and Socialist Party in South Africa.

== Policies ==
SP campaigned for democratic socialism, opposing the bureaucratic 'communist' dictatorships of countries such as China, North Korea, and Cuba. It followed in the Trotskyist tradition of internationalism. It approached collaboration with other left groups from a 'united front' perspective, working alongside other groups while maintaining independent political views.

SP published a list of policy positions on the back page of each edition of its monthly magazine. SP had a democratic internal structure, in which all members voted on resolutions at an annual National Conference, which elected a National Committee to oversee the party between conferences. At branch meetings and national conferences, all members have full democratic rights of discussion, debate, and voting rights. SP operates on the organising principle of democratic centralism, interpreted as: "the right of all members to discuss programme, policies, strategies and tactics inside the party, while agreeing to a united approach outside around the majority decision." SP kept the majority of its branch meetings open to the public.

=== Attitude toward BDS campaign ===
Unlike much of the Australian far-left, the SP did not endorse the tactic of a "Boycott, Divestment and Sanctions" campaign against Israel.

Instead, they supported a revolutionary socialist solution in the conflict, writing: "A single state solution will be fought against to the death by the Israeli state, backed by their own working class. A capitalist two-state solution, as pushed by the likes of US and the EU, will be a Jewish dominated state with second-class rights and standards of living for the Palestinian masses. By far the best solution for working people and the poor in the region is a socialist two-state solution."

== Election of Socialist Party councillors ==
In the past SP has had two local councillors in the City of Yarra. In November 2004 an SP member, Stephen Jolly, was elected to the City of Yarra. Jolly was elected to the Langridge Ward at the 2004 council elections with a first preference count of 12.34%. He was re-elected to Yarra council in 2008 with a first preference count of 29.18%, out-polling the Greens candidate in his ward (who received 26.29%) and the ALP (who received 16.12% in 2008, down from 28.14% in 2004). After the 2010 Victorian State election, the Melbourne Leader reported that the SP was likely to pick up a second seat from retiring ALP Mayor Jane Garrett who had been elected to the seat of Brunswick. The vacancy was filled by Anthony Main, who was elected into that seat on 23 January 2011.

In October 2012 the SP ran five candidates in three wards for the nine-seat council election. Stephen Jolly again outpolled all other candidates in his ward and across Yarra. As in 2008, he was re-elected on first preferences alone. The party increased his first preference vote to 34.34%. Anthony Main received 11.75% running in Melba ward, quintupling the Socialist Party's vote in that ward and becoming the third highest first preference individual candidate there. He failed to win a seat after preferences were allocated. The Socialist Party received 36.56% (up from 29%) in Langridge Ward, 11.75% (up from 2%) in Melba Ward and 10.71% (up from 5%) in Nicholls ward for all their candidates. Their total vote across Yarra was 18.96% (up from 12.16%).

After the resignation of Stephen Jolly from the party in 2016, the Socialist Party no longer has any elected councillors.

=== Council activity ===
Socialist Party opposed each annual budget in the city of Yarra, being the only councillors that consistently voted against rate rises and neoliberal budget policies. They raised resolutions to make council activities more transparent, and published regular reports on Yarra Council meetings.

They opposed unpopular developments and campaigned to block developers from holding secret meetings with councillors. They opposed the use of parking waivers in areas with limited street parking available, and lobbied for a new indoor sports centre and the use of unused council buildings as hubs for local artists. Their policies included reversing the privatisation of rubbish collection, providing more childcare facilities, and the expansion and improvement of public housing. They intended to use council positions to oppose the sell-off of public housing land by the state government, and to bring the maintenance of public housing estates back under council control. They were known for providing representation for the residents of public housing estates in council chambers, including bringing media attention to issues such as inadequate maintenance and cockroach infestations, and they worked with residents to lobby council for improvements to sporting facilities at Atherton Gardens. Despite having an absolute minority on council (and being the only dissident votes on many issues), they managed to achieve some changes by mobilising ordinary residents outside of council chambers, such as securing funding for a public transport advocacy group, helping to revive the Brunswick Street Festival and saving the Loughnan Hall and Tudor Street community centres in Richmond.

== See also ==
- Socialism in Australia
