= Stephen Jolly =

Australian politician (born 1962)

Cr Stephen Jolly
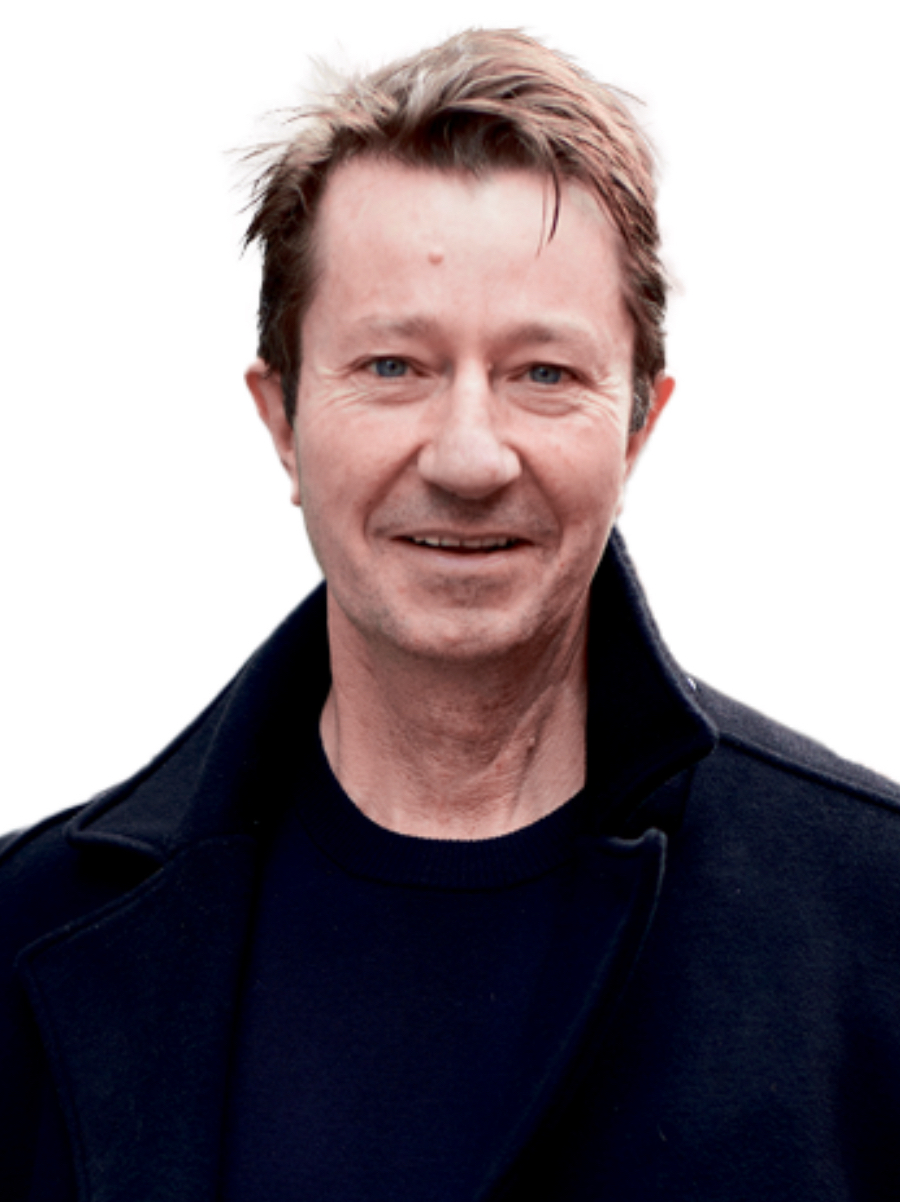
- c. 2024

Mayor of Yarra
- Incumbent
- Assumed office 19 November 2024
- Preceded by: Edward Crossland

Councillor of the City of Yarra for MacKillop Ward
- Incumbent
- Assumed office 26 October 2024
- Preceded by: Ward re-established

Councillor of the City of Yarra for Langridge Ward
- In office 26 November 2004 – 26 October 2024
- Succeeded by: Evangeline Aston

Personal details
- Born: 1962 (age 63–64) London, England
- Party: Yarra For All (2024–present); Independent (2017–2018, 2019–present)
- Other political affiliations: Labour (Ireland) (1982–1985); Socialist (1985–2016); The Socialists (2016–2017); Victorian Socialists (2018–2019)
- Education: University of Cape Town
- Occupation: Construction worker CFMMEU delegate Councillor (Yarra City Council)
- Profession: Politician

Stephen Jolly (born 1962) is an Australian politician and socialist activist. He currently serves as the mayor of Yarra and has been a councillor of the City of Yarra since 2004, initially representing Langridge Ward before being elected to MacKillop Ward in 2024. Originally from London and raised in Ireland, he studied at the University of Cape Town before migrating to Australia in 1985.

Jolly was a member of the Militant faction in the Australian Labor Party (later the Socialist Party). He served as editor of The Militant newspaper and later as National Secretary. He addressed the student occupation at Tiananmen Square and was later involved in pro-democracy in China rallies. Jolly was involved in an occupation of Richmond High School in 1993, an action opposing the school's closure.

Jolly unsuccessfully ran for election to the Victorian Parliament several times while a member of the Socialist Party. He was president and lead candidate for the Victorian Socialists during the 2018 Victorian state election. He led the independent group "Yarra for All", in the City of Yarra at the 2024 Victorian Council elections, with the group picking up 4 out of 9 councillors.

== Early life and education ==
Jolly was born in London to an Irish single mother who had left Ireland due to concerns regarding the predominant Catholic Church's attitude towards single parents. He was raised in Ireland by his grandparents in a public housing estate. Jolly moved to study at the University of Cape Town in 1977. He moved to Sydney, Australia in 1985 with his then Australian wife. Jolly moved to Melbourne after 1989.

== Activism ==
On Jolly's arrival to Australia he became involved in the Militant faction of the Australian Labor Party (later renamed to the Socialist Party), serving as Editor of its newspaper The Militant and as National Secretary until 2000. While working in construction, he has served as a shop steward with the Construction, Forestry, Mining, Maritime and Energy Union (CFMMEU).

In 1989, at the age of 27, Jolly was a first-hand witness of the 1989 Tiananmen Square protests and massacre while he was speaking to protestors and helped them organise. According to Australian newspapers, Jolly was the only Westerner to address "the half-a-million strong crowd of students occupying Tiananmen Square". He noted in a 1990 news article that the protestors "never believed the People's Army would turn against them" and has since been involved in pro-democracy in China rallies.

In 1993, Jolly and Militant were involved in a 360-day occupation of Richmond High School, which unsuccessfully sought to prevent the Victorian government from closing the school. During the occupation he stood on the front lines as police advanced towards them with raised batons. In 2000, he supported and was involved in the S11 anti-globalisation protests in Melbourne. In 2011 and 2012, he pledged to support the Occupy Melbourne movement against corporate influence in politics.

Jolly's socialist political stances have led to hostile reactions from far-right groups such as the United Patriots Front, which has promoted rallies and death threats against him. In 2015, a man was charged over death and rape threats towards Jolly.

In 2016, Jolly led a mass resignation from the Socialist Party (now Socialist Action). He alleged there had been a cover-up of allegations of sexual abuse within the party. The party denied any cover-up. Jolly and others who had left then established a new group, The Socialists. In 2018 he joined the Victorian Socialists, an electoral alliance combining the Socialist Alliance, Socialist Alternative, as well as non-party affiliated socialists. Jolly resigned from the Victorian Socialists in September 2019 after the party executive voted to suspend his membership.

== Political career ==
=== Socialist Party (1999–2016) ===
Jolly ran for election to the Victorian electoral district of Richmond as a member of the Socialist Party several times. In these elections he stood as an independent, as the party was not registered with the Victorian Electoral Commission. In the 1999 Victorian state election he gained 12.0% of the vote. Jolly re-contested the seat in the 2002, 2006, 2010, and 2014 state elections, with lesser success. During these elections the party campaigned for policies such as free public transport, promoting the local arts scene, anti-capitalism. Their 2010 campaign was supported by the CFMMEU, the Electrical Trades Union (ETU), and the United Firefighters Union (UFU), who raised $25,000 for the campaign.

=== Victorian Socialists (2018–2019) ===
In February 2018, Jolly announced that he will be contesting a seat in the Legislative Council in the 2018 Victorian state elections as the leading candidate of the Victorian Socialists ticket. Jolly stated that the campaign would fight for programs promoted by international left-wing politicians such as Jeremy Corbyn, Bernie Sanders, and Jean-Luc Mélenchon.

The decision to run in the Northern Metropolitan Region was considered controversial by Reason Party's Fiona Patten, due to the possibility of splitting the non-conservative vote in the count for the last seat. This ticket was supported by a wide variety of trade union groups, including the ETU, the National Union of Workers, the CFMMEU, the UFU, the Australasian Meat Industry Employees Union, and the Victorian Allied Health Professionals Association. The ETU secretary Troy Gray justified this support over parties such as the Australian Labor Party, a traditional unionist party, by stating that Jolly was the only candidate representing "blue collar values".

Following allegations of an unspecified nature, Jolly resigned from Victorian Socialists in September 2019.

=== Local government (2004–present) ===
In 2004, he was elected as a Councillor for City of Yarra in the Langridge Ward, representing the suburbs of Abbotsford, Alphington, Clifton Hill, Collingwood, Fairfield, Fitzroy and Richmond. In 2017, Jolly voted in favour of the controversial decision to cancel its Australia Day ceremony as a part of the Change the Date campaign. This resulted in backlash from the federal government whereby the council was stripped of its citizenship powers and the council being protested by nationalist groups.

==== Mayor of Yarra (2024–present) ====
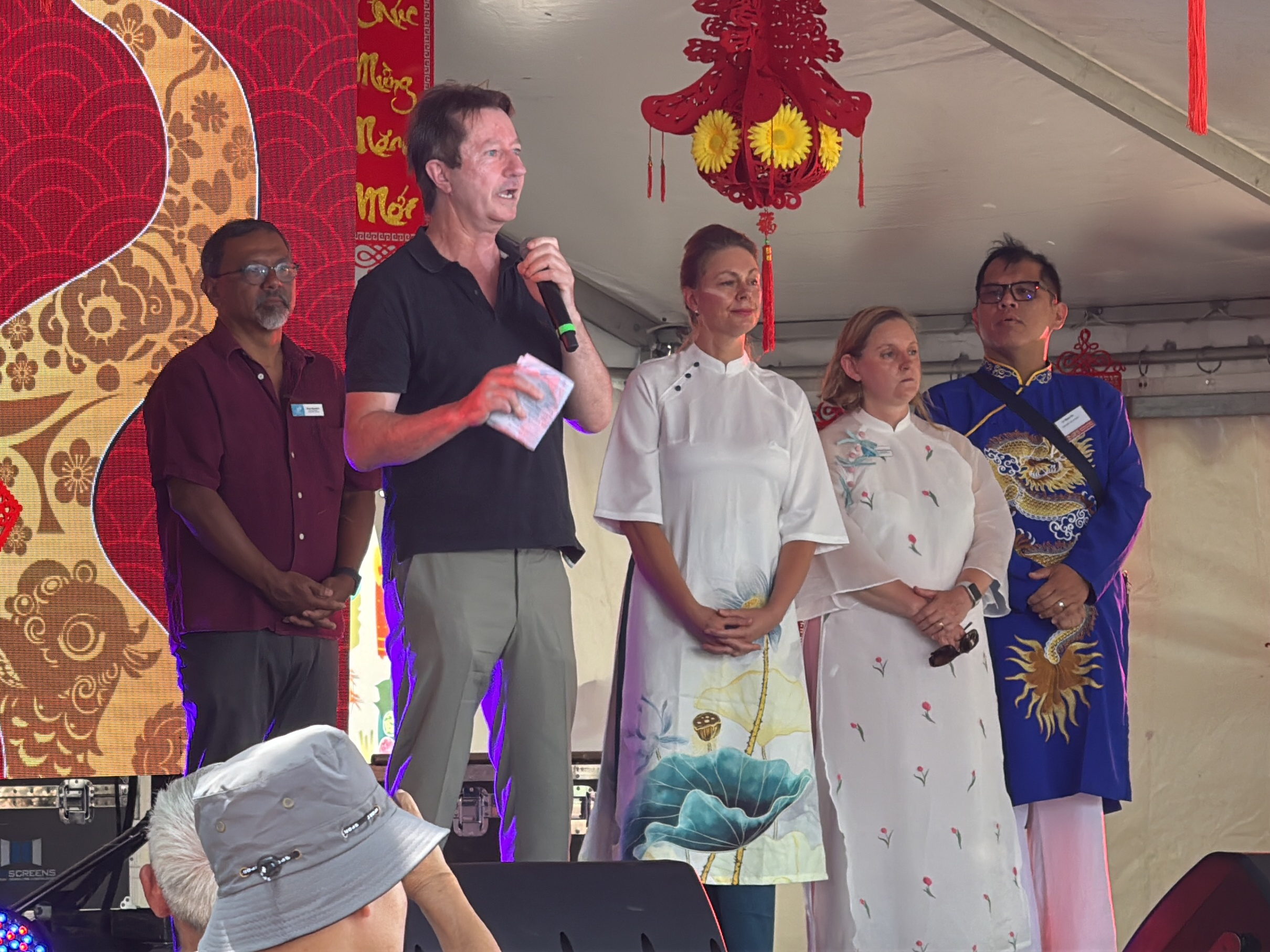
Jolly and other City of Yarra councillors in February 2025

In 2024 Jolly was elected as the Councillor for the Mackillop ward. Jolly ran with a grouping of independents named "Yarra for All". The grouping picked up 4 out of 9 councillors, dislodging the Greens from power. On 19 November 2024 Jolly was elected to serve as mayor of the City of Yarra for 2025. He was re-elected in November 2025 to serve as mayor for 2026.

Jolly has been opposed to a new emergency services levy. The Victorian government plan would have local councils collecting the levy on behalf of the state government. He has stated that the levy would make councils "debt collectors for Spring Street".

In October 2025, Jolly was charged with assault following an alleged incident at an election afterparty in Fitzroy in November 2024. He has stated that he will contest the charge. The charge was subsequently dismissed by Magistrate Jill Prior, who ruled that the prosecution could not prove that Jolly intended to commit assault.

As Mayor, Jolly has called for a safe injecting room in Richmond to be relocated away from its current location next to a primary school. A former advocate for the facility, he called its placement "the greatest public policy disaster in recent Victorian history". Under Jolly's leadership, the City of Yarra, voted in November 2025 to end its long-term support for the room.

Jolly has been critical of a Victorian government plan to demolish public housing towers, some of which are in Yarra council's area, calling it a "land grab for developers". In testimony to a parliamentary enquiry, he stated that the plan was designed to hand over valuable real estate to construct "high-rises for rich people". Jolly, a former public housing tenant, stated that "[t]his is ethnic cleansing. This is class cleansing. If those towers go down, Fitzroy will be wall-to-wall rich people." The government stated that the towers are "past their shelf life" and "not habitable"; however, he said "Eighty per cent of private high-rise apartments in Melbourne ... don't reach the minimum standards that have been used against the public housing towers right now as a reason for demolition".

== Personal life ==
Jolly is in a romantic relationship with fellow Yarra councillor Evangeline Aston.
