= City of Yarra =

Local government area in Melbourne, Victoria, Australia

Coordinates: 37°49′S 145°00′E

- Local government area
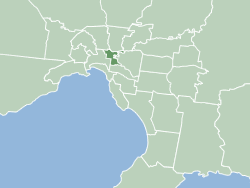

- Interactive map of City of Yarra
- Country: Australia
- State: Victoria
- Region: Greater Melbourne
- Established: 22 June 1994
- Council seat: Richmond

Government
  - Mayor: Stephen Jolly
  - State electorates: Brunswick; Northcote; Richmond
  - Federal divisions: Cooper; Melbourne; Wills

Area
  - Total: 19.5 km^{2} (7.5 sq mi)

Population
  - Total: 91,543 (2021)
  - Density: 4,695/km^{2} (12,159/sq mi)
- Website: City of Yarra
LGAs around City of Yarra
Merri-bek	Darebin	Banyule
Melbourne	City of Yarra	Boroondara
Melbourne	Stonnington	Stonnington

The City of Yarra is a local government area (LGA) in Victoria, Australia in the inner eastern and northern suburbs of Melbourne. It is the second smallest LGA in the state (after the Borough of Queenscliffe) with an area of 19.5 square kilometres (7.5 sq mi), and in June 2021 it had a population of 91,543, making it the second most densely populated LGA (after the City of Port Phillip), with around 4,695 people per square kilometre.

The administrative centre of the City of Yarra is the old Richmond Town Hall in Bridge Road, Richmond. The Collingwood Town Hall in Hoddle Street, Abbotsford is also still used by the council as secondary offices and as a service centre, and the Fitzroy Town Hall in Napier Street, Fitzroy is used for the local library and for use as a community space. Some council committees also meet at the Fitzroy and Collingwood Town Halls.

The city is culturally and socially diverse. The 2016 Australian Census found that 38.8% of residents were born outside Australia, with the largest numbers being born in England, New Zealand, Vietnam, China and Greece.

The City of Yarra has some of Melbourne's best shopping streets. These include Bridge Road and Swan and Victoria streets in Richmond, Brunswick and Gertrude streets in Fitzroy and Smith Street in Collingwood. In 2021, Smith Street was named the coolest street in the world.

As of November 2024, the mayor is Stephen Jolly, and the deputy mayor is Labor councillor Sarah McKenzie. The CEO since June 2022 is Sue Wilkinson.

== History ==
The suburbs of the City of Yarra were established in the mid-to-late 19th century and retain a Victorian appearance. The majority of housing in the city is made up of Victorian cottages or terraces or apartments built from the 1960s.

The City of Yarra was formed in 1994 as a result of the amalgamation of the former Cities of Richmond, Collingwood, Fitzroy, and parts of Carlton North (previously part of the City of Melbourne) and parts of Alphington and Fairfield (previously part of the former City of Northcote).

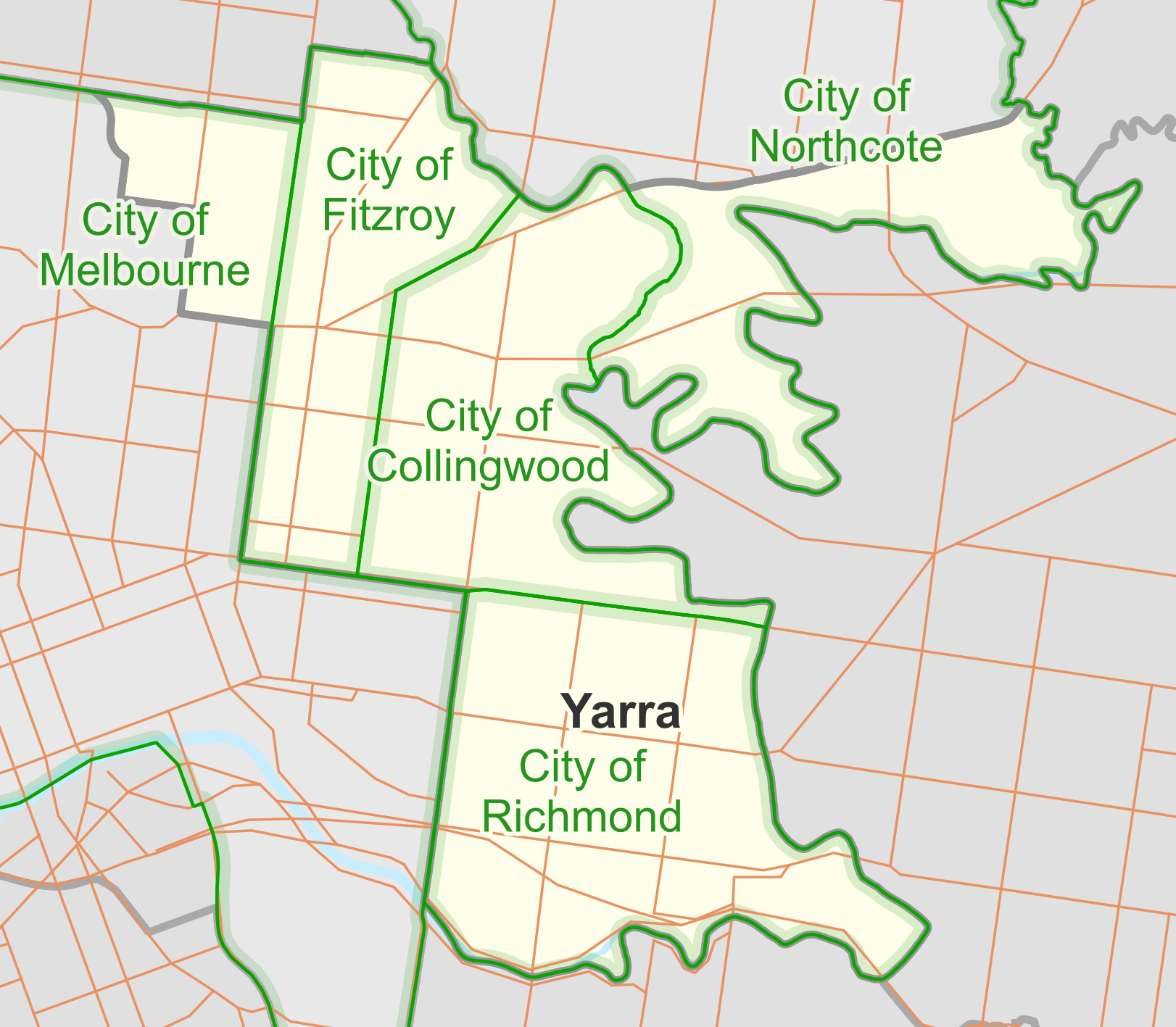
The City of Yarra's predecessor LGAs (green) as they were in 1993

== Council ==
Yarra City Council

Structure
- Council political groups: Yarra For All (4); Independents (2); Greens (2); Labor (1)
- 2024 ward boundaries. Expand the map and click on a ward to see the ward name

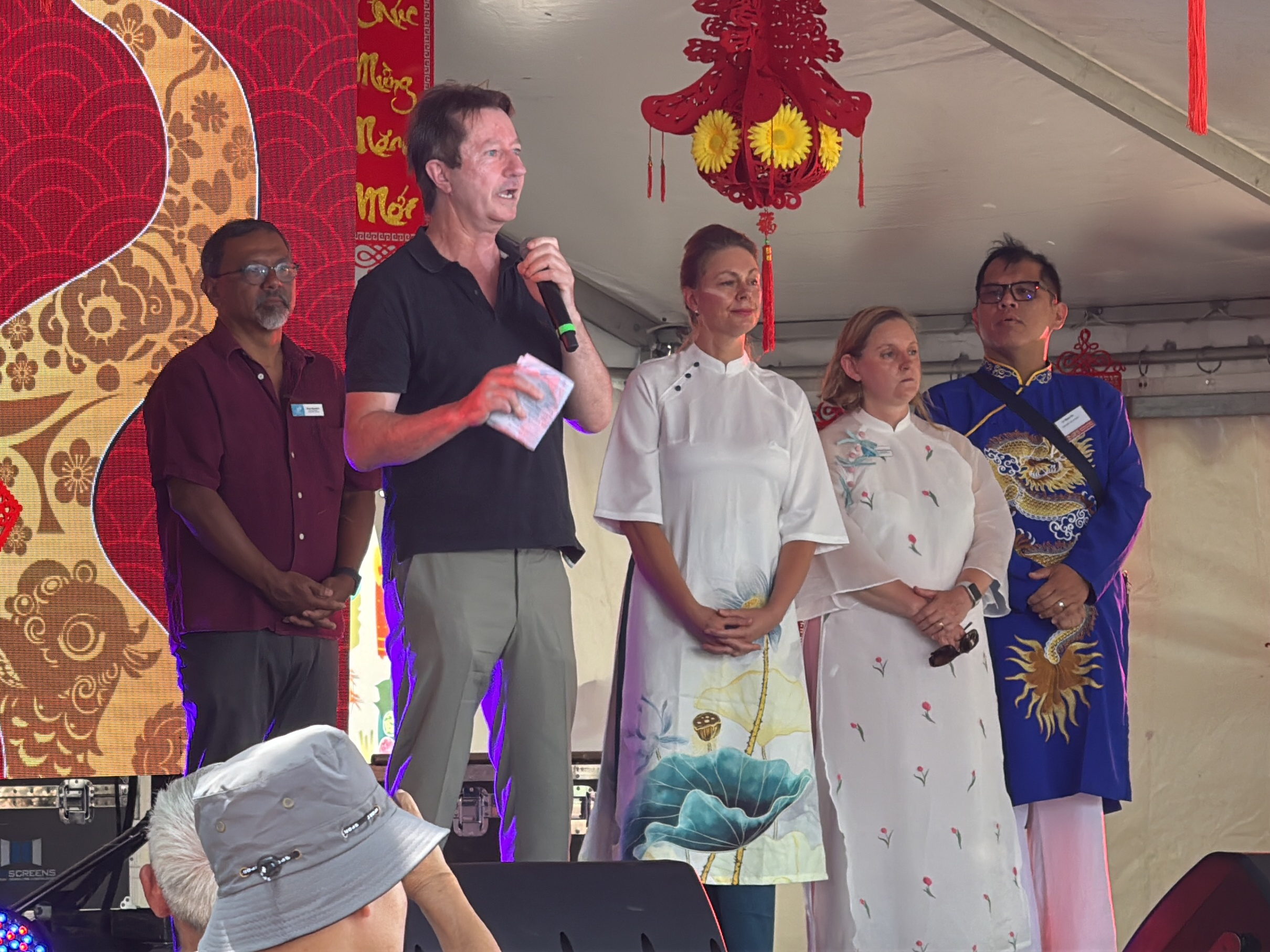
Five of the nine councillors in February 2025, from left to right: Kenneth Gomez, Stephen Jolly (mayor), Evangeline Aston, Sharon Harrison and Meca Ho

Yarra City Council is composed of nine single-member wards. Prior to the 2024 election, it was composed of three multi-member wards with three members each, but the electoral structure changed as a result of the Local Government Act 2020.

All councillors are elected for a fixed four-year term of office. The mayor is elected annually in November by a special meeting of the full council.

=== Current composition ===
Party	Councillors
Yarra For All	4
Independent	2
Greens	2
Labor	1
Total	9

The current council, elected in 2024, is:

Ward	Councillor	Party	Notes
Boulevard	Sharon Harrison	Yarra For All	
Curtain	Edward Crossland	Greens	
Hoddle	Sophie Wade	Greens	
Langridge	Evangeline Aston	Yarra For All	
Lennox	Andrew Davies	Independent	
MacKillop	Stephen Jolly	Yarra For All	Mayor
Melba	Meca Ho	Independent	
Nicholls	Kenneth Gomez	Yarra For All	
Yarra Bend	Sarah McKenzie	Labor	Deputy Mayor

== Past councillors ==
=== 1996–2004 (five wards) ===
Year	Carringbush		Docker		MacKillop		Merri	Nicholson	
Year	Councillor	Councillor	Councillor	Councillor	Councillor	Councillor	Councillor	Councillor	Councillor
1996	John Sawyer (Labor)	Li Hiam Lai (Labor)	Marion Macleod (Independent)	James Martakis (Independent)	Steve Watson (Labor)	Linda Hoskins (Labor)	Robyn Williams (Labor)	John Phillips (Labor)	Ray Thomas (Labor)
1999	Sue Corby (Labor)	Li Hiam Lai (Labor)	Fiona Harman (Labor)	Kay Meadows (Labor)	Steve Watson (Labor)	Linda Hoskins (Labor)	Robyn Williams (Labor)	John Phillips (Labor)	Ray Thomas (Labor)
2001	Sue Corby (Labor)	Li Hiam Lai (Labor)	Fiona Harman (Labor)	Kay Meadows (Labor)	Steve Watson (Labor)	Linda Hoskins (Labor)	Robyn Williams (Labor)	John Phillips (Labor)	Gurm Sekhon (Greens)
2002	Sue Corby (Labor)	Li Hiam Lai (Labor)	Judy Morton (Ind. Labor)	Kay Meadows (Labor)	Greg Barber (Greens)	Deborah Di Natale (Greens)	Jenny Farrar (Greens)	Jackie Fristacky (Independent)	Gurm Sekhon (Greens)

=== 2004–2024 (three wards) ===
==== Langridge Ward ====
Year	Councillor	Party	Councillor	Party	Councillor	Party
2004	Jenny Farrar	Greens	Annabel Barbara	Labor	Stephen Jolly	Socialist
2008	Jenny Farrar	Greens	Geoff Barbour	Labor	Stephen Jolly	Socialist
2008	Amanda Stone	Greens	Geoff Barbour	Labor	Stephen Jolly	Socialist
2012	Amanda Stone	Greens	Geoff Barbour	Labor	Stephen Jolly	Socialist
2016	Amanda Stone	Greens	Geoff Barbour	Labor	Stephen Jolly	The Socialists
2016	Amanda Stone	Greens	Danae Bosler	Labor	Stephen Jolly	The Socialists
2017	Amanda Stone	Greens	Danae Bosler	Labor	Stephen Jolly	Independent Socialist
2018	Amanda Stone	Greens	Danae Bosler	Labor	Stephen Jolly	Victorian Socialists
2019	Amanda Stone	Greens	Danae Bosler	Labor	Stephen Jolly	Independent Socialist
2020	Anab Mohamud	Greens	Gabrielle de Vietri	Greens	Stephen Jolly	Independent Socialist
2023	Anab Mohamud	Greens	Michael Glynatsis	Independent	Stephen Jolly	Independent Socialist
2024	Anab Mohamud	Independent	Michael Glynatsis	Yarra For All	Stephen Jolly	Yarra For All

==== Melba Ward ====
Year	Councillor	Party	Councillor	Party	Councillor	Party
2004	Kay Meadows	Labor	Gurm Sekhon	Greens	Judy Morton	Independent Labor
2008	Josh Funder	Labor	Allison Clarke	Greens	Dale Smedley	Independent
2012	Simon Huggins	Labor	Misha Coleman	Greens	Phillip Vlahogiannis	Independent
2016	Mi-Lin Chen Yi Mei	Labor	James Searle	Greens	Daniel Nguyen	Independent
2020	Herschel Landes	Independent	Edward Crossland	Greens	Claudia Nguyen	Independent

==== Nicholls Ward ====
Year	Councillor	Party	Councillor	Party	Councillor	Party
2004	Kathleen Maltzahn	Greens	Paul D'Agostino	Labor	Jackie Fristacky	Independent
2008	Sam Gaylard	Greens	Jane Garrett	Labor	Jackie Fristacky	Independent
2011	Sam Gaylard	Greens	Anthony Main	Socialist	Jackie Fristacky	Independent
2012	Sam Gaylard	Greens	Roberto Colanzi	Labor	Jackie Fristacky	Independent
2016	Mike McEvoy	Greens	Misha Coleman	Greens	Jackie Fristacky	Independent
2017	Mike McEvoy	Greens	Misha Coleman	Independent	Jackie Fristacky	Independent
2019	Bridgid O'Brien	Independent Socialist	Misha Coleman	Independent	Jackie Fristacky	Independent
2020	Bridgid O'Brien	Independent Socialist	Sophie Wade	Greens	Amanda Stone	Greens
2023	Bridgid O'Brien	Independent Socialist	Sophie Wade	Greens	Amanda Stone	Independent
2024	Bridgid O'Brien	Yarra For All	Sophie Wade	Greens	Amanda Stone	Independent

=== 2024 (nine wards) ===
Year	Boulevard	Curtain	Hoddle	Langridge	Lennox	MacKillop	Melba	Nicholls	Yarra Bend
Year	Councillor	Councillor	Councillor	Councillor	Councillor	Councillor	Councillor	Councillor	Councillor
2024	Sharon Harrison (YFA)	Edward Crossland (Greens)	Sophie Wade (Greens)	Evangeline Aston (YFA)	Andrew Davies (Ind)	Stephen Jolly (YFA)	Meca Ho (Ind)	Kenneth Gomez (YFA)	Sarah McKenzie (Labor)

== Election results ==
=== 2024 ===
2024 Victorian local elections: Yarra
Party	Votes	%	Swing	Seats	Change
Yarra For All	16,157	32.80	+15.85 (Note: Compared to the results of Stephen Jolly (Independent Socialist), Bridgid O'Brien (Independent Socialist) and Michael Glynatis (Independent) in 2020.)	4	▲2
Greens	13,108	26.61	+0.07	2	▼3
Independents	12,685	25.75	−3.03	2	Steady
Victorian Socialists	3,814	7.74	+7.74	0	Steady
Labor	3,491	7.08	−7.23	1	▲1
Formal votes	49,255	97.90	+3.09		
Informal votes	1,058	2.10	−3.09		
Total	50,313	100.0			
Registered voters / turnout	68,723	73.21	+3.07		

=== 2020 ===
2020 Victorian local elections: Yarra
Party	Votes	%	Swing	Seats	Change
Independent	15,081	28.78		2	Steady
Greens	13,909	26.54		5	▲1
Labor	7,501	14.31		0	▼2
Independent Socialist	7,380	14.08		2	▲2
Reason	2,609	4.99	+4.99	0	Steady
Independent Liberal	2,217	4.23	+4.23	0	Steady
Richmond First	1,897	3.62	+3.62	0	Steady
Liberal Democrats	1,282	2.45		0	Steady
Animal Justice	524	1.00		0	Steady
Formal votes	52,400	94.81	+2.86		
Informal votes	2,872	5.19	−2.86		
Total	55,272	100.0		9	
Registered voters / turnout	78,795	70.14	+18.99		

=== 2004 ===
2004 Victorian local elections: Yarra
Party	Votes	%	Seats	Change
Labor	9,486	31.91	3	
Greens	8,264	27.79	3	▼1
Independent	4,839	16.27	1	
Independent Labor	4,104	13.81	1	Steady
Campaign for a Better City	1,897	6.38	0	Steady
Socialist Left-Wing Team	1,359	4.57	1	▲1
Socialist Alliance	302	1.02	0	Steady
Total formal votes	29,729	92.06		
Informal votes	2,563	7.94		
Total	32,292	100.0	9	
Registered voters / Turnout	61,407	52.59		

== Controversies ==
=== Australia Day ===
In August 2017, the Yarra City Council voted unanimously at a town hall meeting to cancel annual Australia Day events, including citizenship ceremonies and instead hold a culturally sensitive event "marking the loss of Indigenous culture". The council also voted to begin lobbying the federal government to change the date of Australia's national day and to use council publications and media to campaign in favour of changing the date. Then Prime Minister, Malcolm Turnbull, accused the council of "using a day that should unite Australians to divide Australians". The City of Darebin later followed suit.

=== Captain Cook statue ===
In May 2025, the Yarra City Council voted unanimously to permanently remove a 1993 statue of Captain Cook from Edinburgh Gardens in North Fitzroy following frequent vandalism, a decision which prompted criticism from Victorian premier Jacinta Allan.

== Townships and localities ==
In the 2021 census, the city had a population of 90,114 up from 86,657 in the 2016 census.

Population
Locality	2016	2021
Abbotsford	8,184	9,088
Alphington^	5,080	5,702
Burnley	769	794
Carlton North^	6,300	6,177
Clifton Hill	6,341	6,606
Collingwood	8,513	9,179
Cremorne	2,018	2,158
Fairfield^	6,558	6,535
Fitzroy	10,445	10,431
Fitzroy North^	12,339	12,781
Princes Hill	2,126	2,005
Richmond	27,705	28,587

^ - Territory divided with another LGA

== Economy ==
The City of Yarra has a high concentration of fashion, technology, and media businesses. Companies located in the City of Yarra include:

- Aesop has its global headquarters on Smith Street, Fitzroy.
- Carsales has its head office located on Punt Road, Richmond.
- Computershare, one of the largest stock exchange technology and registrar service businesses in the world is located on Johnston Street, Abbotsford.
- Country Road, an upscale Australia clothing and homewares manufacturer and retailer is headquartered on Church Street, Richmond
- Epworth the not-for-profit private health care group, employ 1,800 staff at their head office, and largest hospital, on Bridge Road.
- GSK operates offices of its pharmaceutical division on Johnston Street, Abbotsford.
- Just Group and its brands Just Jeans, Jay Jays, Jacqui E, Portmans, Dotti, Peter Alexander, and Smiggle are headquartered on Church Street, Richmond
- Madman Entertainment has its head office in the Richmond suburb and in the Melba Ward in Yarra.
- REA Group which includes realestate.com.au has its head office located on Church Street, Richmond.
- Schwartz Publishing publisher of The Monthly, Quarterly Essay and the book imprint Black Inc is located on Langridge Street, Collingwood.
- SitePoint, a global technology publisher and its website subsidiaries 99designs.com, Flippa.com, Learnable.com and Wave Digital are based on Cambridge Street and Wellingston Street, Collingwood.
- Star Entertainment Group, an ASX-listed radio broadcaster best known for SEN 1116, is based on Swan Street, Richmond.
