= Collingwood Town Hall =

Civic building in Melbourne, Australia

Coordinates: 37.803939°S 144.992484°E

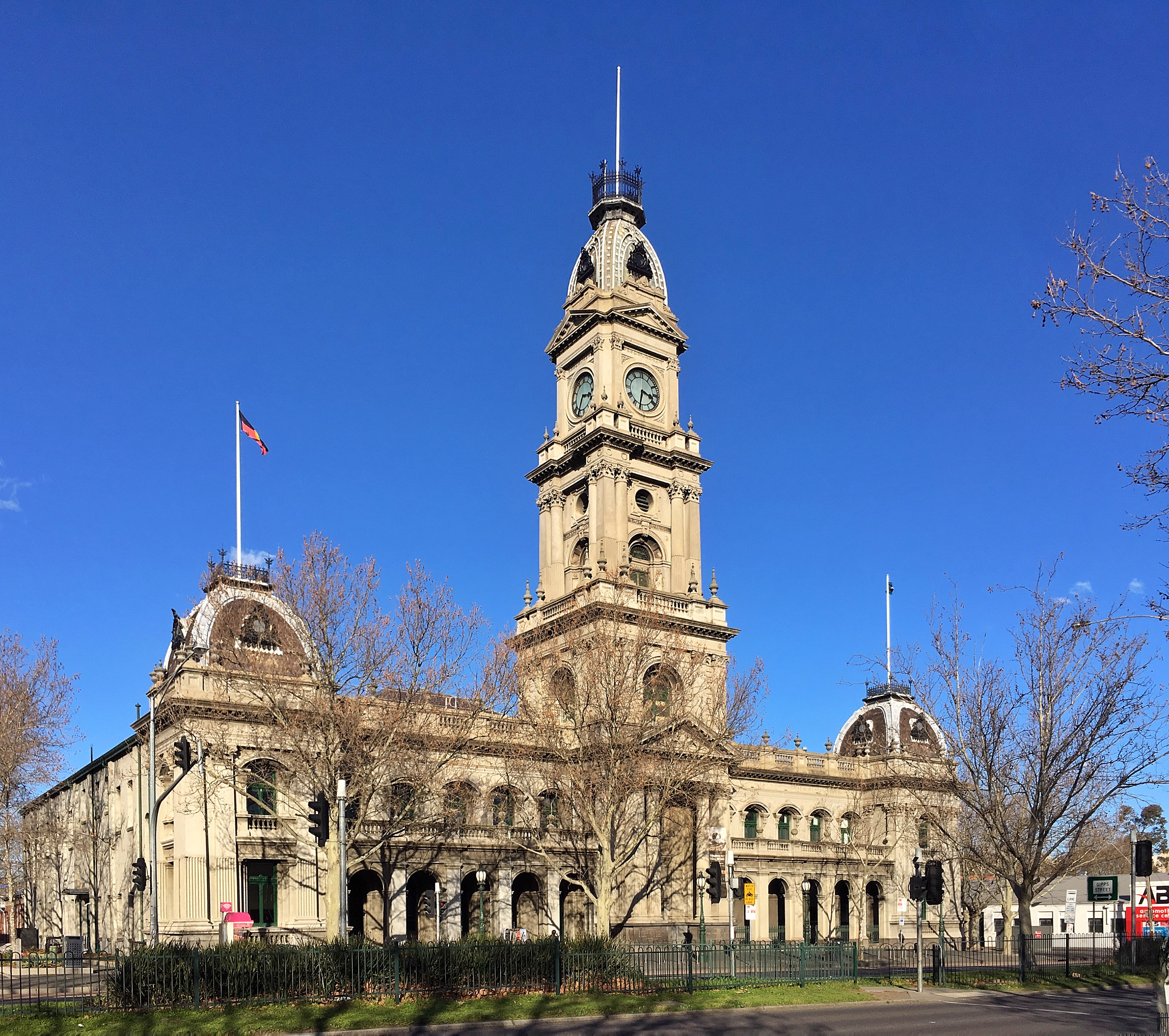
Collingwood Town Hall

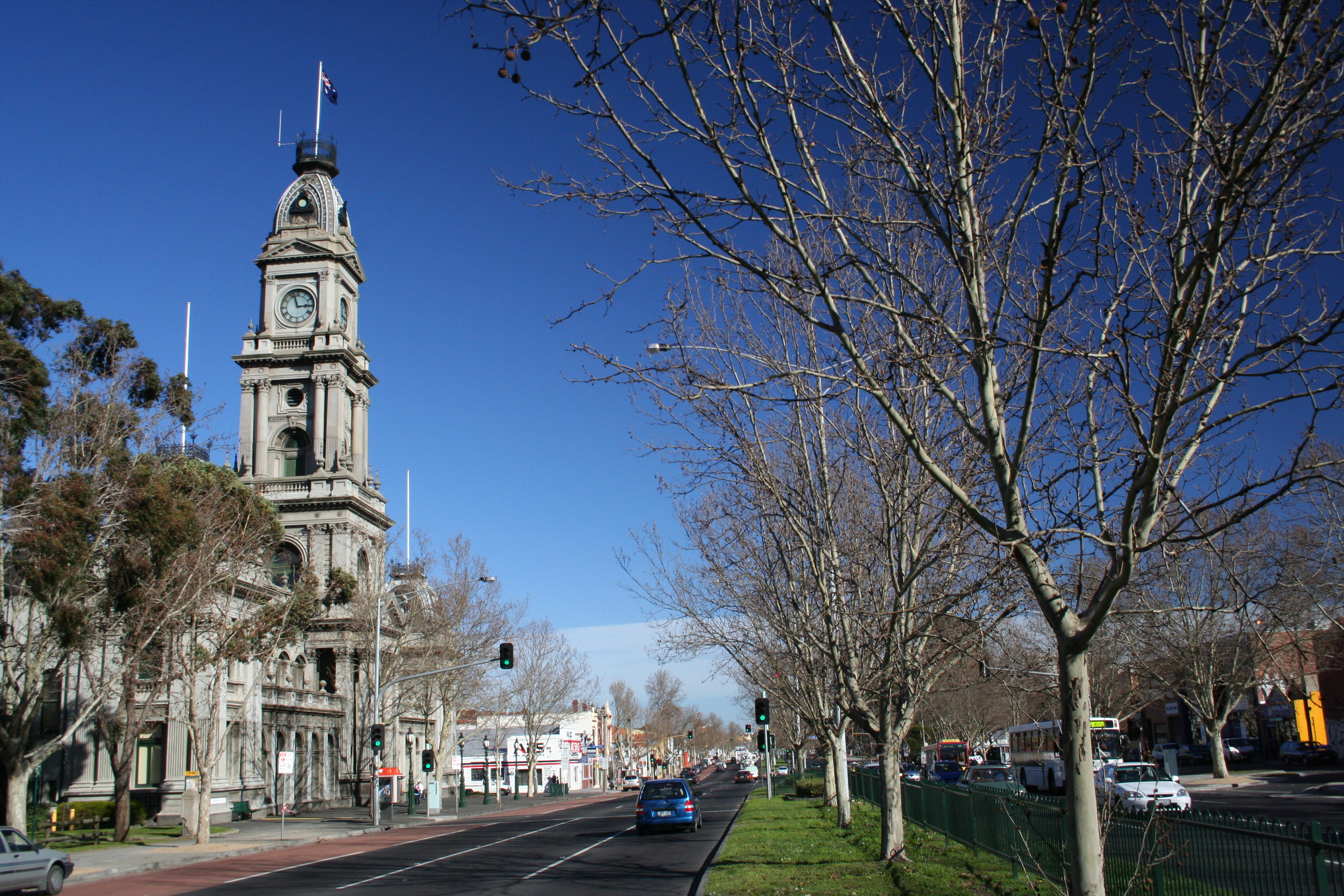
Collingwood Town Hall on Hoddle Street

Collingwood Town Hall is a civic building located on Hoddle Street in Abbotsford, a suburb of Melbourne, Australia.

The hall was built between 1885 and 1887 to the competition-winning design of local architect George R. Johnson in the Second Empire style, rich in detail with domed mansard roofs and a soaring clock tower. It is widely considered one of the finest town halls in Australia, and, along with the Sydney Town Hall and South Melbourne Town Hall, one of the best example of the Second Empire style in Australia.

The Collingwood Town Hall building incorporated many functions in the one project, with a grand hall, a supper room, municipal offices and council chamber, post office, police station and court house, and a mechanics' institute (comprising separate ladies' and gentlemen's library rooms). The opening was held on the 29 March 1887. The clocks in the tower were installed later and were the subject of some debate in September 1887. They are reputed to have been the clocks once at the Melbourne General Post Office which was extended in 1888, but they were in fact ordered from Gaunt & Co, clockmakers, and were to be similar to the clocks at the GPO. Finally ordered in April 1888, and reportedly was on display at the 1888 Melbourne Centennial Exhibition, and the clock bell was cast by Mears and Stainbank at the Whitechapel Foundry, London, in 1890.

It is considered an important example of the work of George R Johnson, possibly the most prolific designer of town halls in late 19th century Victoria (he designed or redesigned at least 6), as well as numerous theatres in Melbourne and other Australian cities.

In 1938 the lobby and hall was significantly remodelled at the time in an Art Deco style, designed by AC Leith & Associates.

The library space, upstairs on the north side, that was to be a mechanic's institute, became by the 1890s the Collingwood Municipal Library, open to the public until 10 p.m. In 1950 it moved downstairs to the former supper room, and then in 1978 into a former church across Stanton Street on the south side of the Town Hall. All the former rooms became office space.

After the amalgamation of the City of Collingwood with the Cities of Fitzroy and Richmond in 1994 to form the City of Yarra, the Town Hall now functions as secondary offices and service centre for the Collingwood area for the City of Yarra. The Collingwood Police Station still operates from the rear on Eddy Court. The hall itself is used for special functions and as an exhibition space.

In 2014 the hall was extensively renovated, and brought up to modern standards.

== See also ==
- List of town halls in Melbourne
- City of Yarra
- List of mayors of Yarra
- List of mayors of Collingwood
