= Richmond Town Hall, Melbourne =

Civic building in Melbourne, Australia

Coordinates: 37.818357°S 145.000622°E

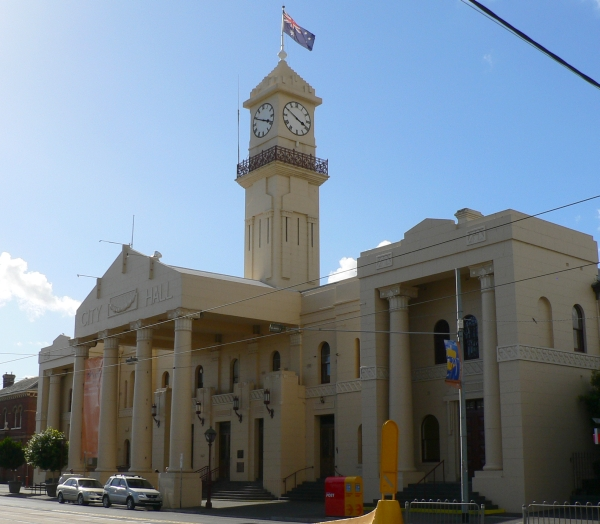
Richmond Town Hall

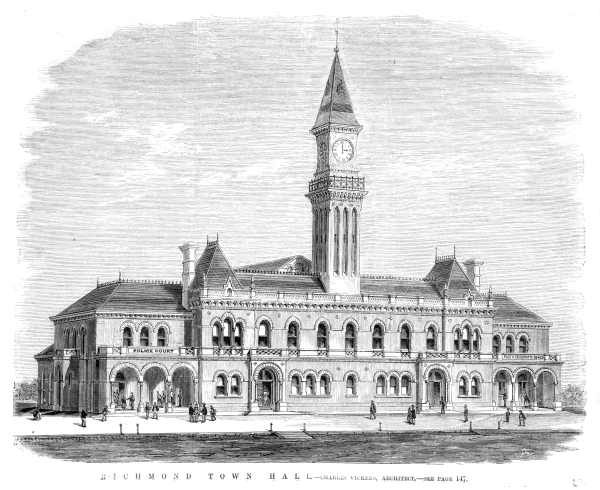
Lithograph of the 1870 design

Richmond Town Hall is a civic building located on Bridge Road in Richmond, a suburb of Melbourne, Australia.

== Architecture ==
Built in the 1890s, the original Richmond Town Hall was in the Venetian Gothic Revival style, consisting of polychrome brickwork and a large tower. In the 1930s, the façade was remodelled in the Interwar Academic Classical Revival style, with Art Deco decorations, to become the Richmond City Hall.

The Town Hall was refurbished in 1991, but some sections of the rear of the building, and some interior spaces, retain the original Victorian era detailing. After the amalgamation of the City of Richmond with the City of Collingwood and the City of Fitzroy in 1994, to form the new City of Yarra, the Town Hall became the corporate headquarters for the new Yarra City Council.

== See also ==
- List of Town Halls in Melbourne
- City of Yarra
- List of mayors of Yarra
- List of mayors of Richmond
