= Fitzroy Town Hall =

Civic building in Fitzroy, Melbourne, Australia

Coordinates: 37.802096°S 144.97955°E

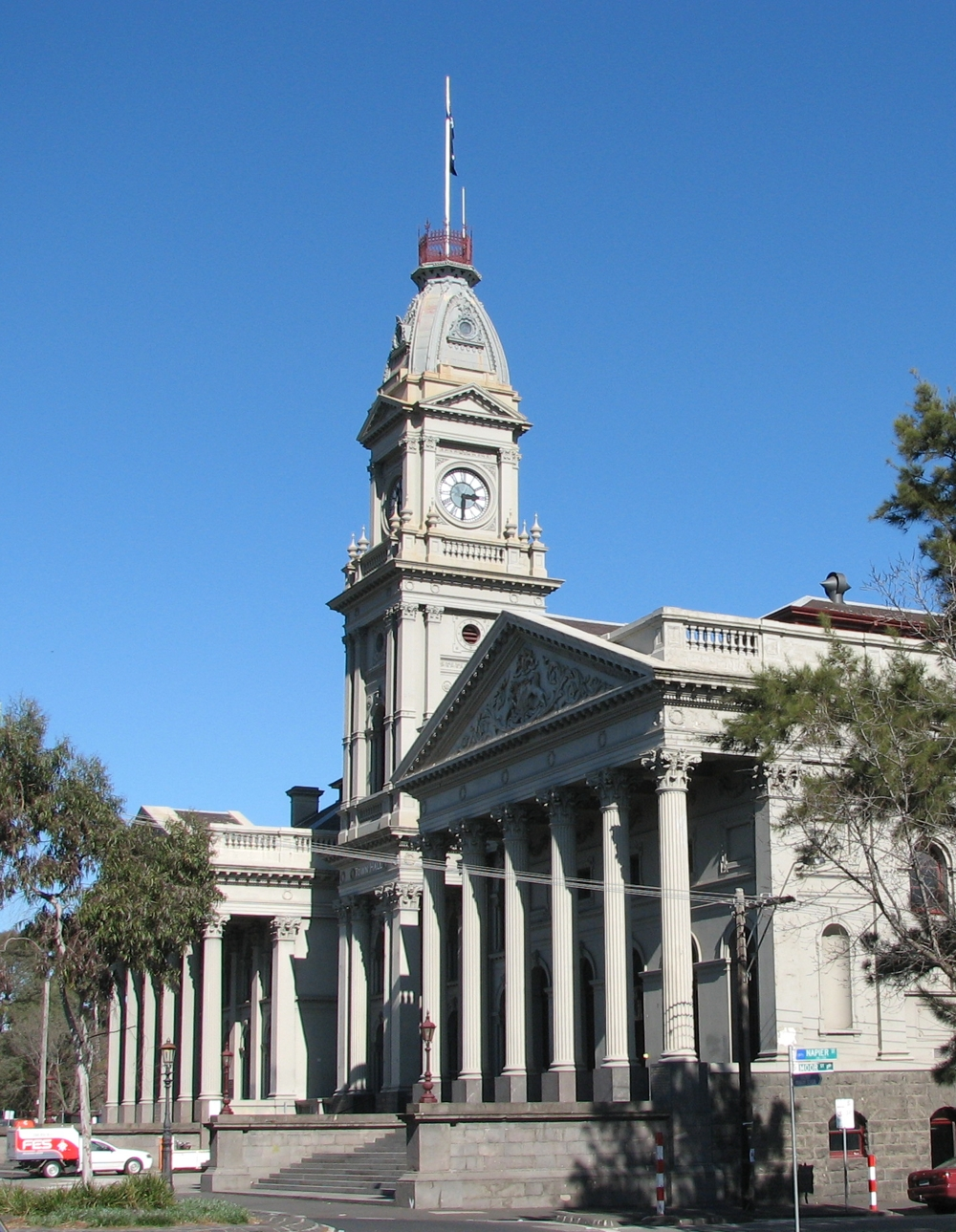
Fitzroy Town Hall

Fitzroy Town Hall is a civic building located in Napier Street in Fitzroy, a suburb of Melbourne, Australia.

It was constructed in two separate stages. The first consisted of a hall and tower which was designed by William J. Ellis and built in 1873. Between 1887 and 1890, a new stage designed by George Johnson was added to this comprising municipal offices, a police station and a courthouse as well as extensions to the hall. The clock tower added at this time replaced the original tower.

The building is an example of the Free Classical style of Victorian architecture and is recorded as a "Heritage place" by Heritage Victoria.

After the amalgamation of the City of Fitzroy with the Cities of Collingwood and Richmond in 1994 forming the City of Yarra, the Town Hall now functions as secondary offices, service centre and library servicing the Collingwood area for the City of Yarra. The Town Hall is also currently the home of Fitzroy Legal Service Inc, Australia's oldest non-Aboriginal community legal service. The Town Hall is also used for special functions and as an exhibition space.

== See also ==
- List of town halls in Melbourne
- City of Yarra
