= City of Brunswick =

Coordinates: 37°46′01″S 144°57′40″E

- Local government area
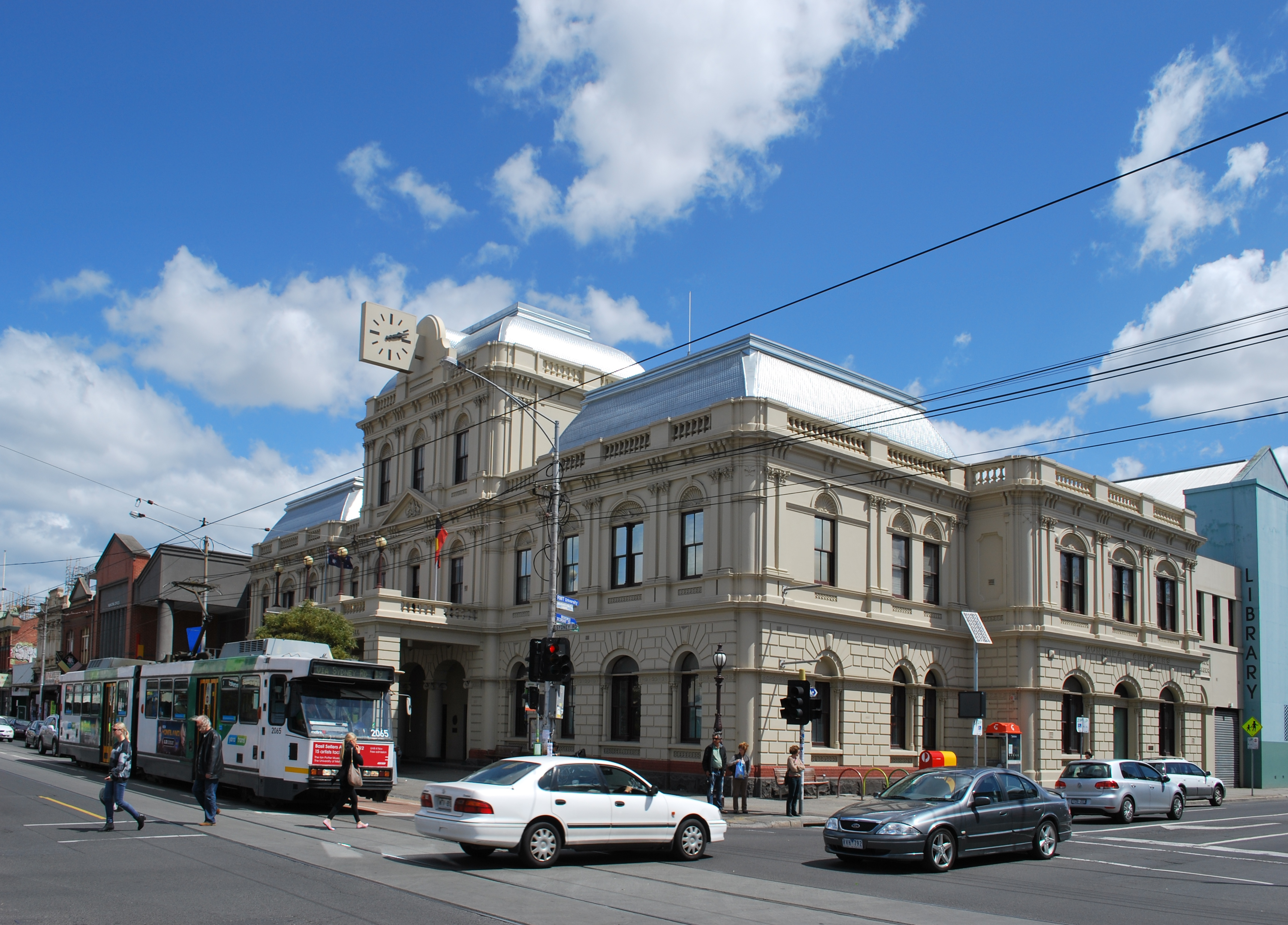
- Brunswick Town Hall

- The City of Brunswick as at its dissolution in 1994
- Country: Australia
- State: Victoria
- Region: Northern Melbourne
- Established: 1857
- Council seat: Brunswick

Area
  - Total: 11.01 km^{2} (4.25 sq mi)

Population
  - Total(s): 41,100 (1992)
  - Density: 3,733/km^{2} (9,668/sq mi)
- County: Bourke
LGAs around City of Brunswick
| Essendon | Coburg | Preston |
| Essendon | City of Brunswick | Northcote |
| Melbourne | Melbourne | Fitzroy |

The City of Brunswick was a local government area in the inner-northern suburbs of Melbourne, Victoria, Australia. It comprised the suburbs of Brunswick, Brunswick East and Brunswick West. It ceased to exist on 22 June 1994, when its council was disbanded by the Kennett Government and replaced with appointed commissioners, who oversaw its amalgamation with the City of Coburg and parts of the City of Broadmeadows, to create the City of Moreland (now City of Merri-bek).

== History ==
The area that was to become the City of Brunswick was first surveyed in 1839, a large tract of mostly flat land bounded on the east and west by the Merri Merri and the Moonee Ponds Creeks respectively. The land was subdivided into long narrow agricultural allotments running east and west from a central service road, later to become Sydney Road. In 1841, Thomas Wilkinson, one of the major landowners in the area named his estate Brunswick, after Princess Caroline of Brunswick, wife of King George IV. In 1846, a post office taking the name Brunswick was opened on this estate. In 1852, the Brunswick Hotel was opened on Sydney Road.

On 29 September 1857, Brunswick was proclaimed a municipal district. The first meeting of the council of the new municipality was held in the Cornish Arms Hotel, on 23 October of that year. There were seven councillors elected by the votes of 581 landowners from 14 nominations. The councillors represented two wards, four from the working class south and three from the more moneyed north. Despite a numerical disadvantage, the northern councillors proved more powerful and influential. The purpose-built municipal chambers were opened in 1859 on Sydney Road. This building became the Borough Chambers when the municipality was proclaimed a borough in 1862, being turned into a police station when a Town Hall was constructed in the centre of the town in 1876.

In 1870, the southern border became Park Street, when the City of Melbourne defined its boundaries. Between 1869 and 1877, there were toll gates operated by the Government on the main north-south thoroughfares of Brunswick (Sydney Road and Lygon Street), at Park Street and Moreland Road, the northern boundary. In 1884, the precursor to the Upfield railway line opened, running from Spencer Street at the western edge of Melbourne city to Coburg, with two stations in Brunswick at what are today named Jewell and Brunswick stations. Thus far, commercial activity in Sydney Road had been concentrated at its southern end, but after 1884, the shopping strip began to be extended north of Albert Street.

In 1887, Hill Farm to the west of the municipality was subdivided, bringing the town of West Brunswick into existence, centred on Daly Street. On 1 October of the same year, the cable tram to the city centre opened. On 13 April 1888, Brunswick reached the status of a town (Municipal). In 1889, the Brunswick Gas company was launched. In 1897, the first motor car in Victoria arrived courtesy of Brunswick resident John Pender. That same year on 18 October, the area's first permanent Labor political organisation was formed, the United Labor Party, Brunswick Branch.

In 1904, Brunswick elected its first representative in the Victorian Legislative Assembly, the state parliament. Frank Anstey, of the Labor Party, was the member, and the party held the seat until 2018, when Tim Read of The Greens defeated ALP candidate Cindy O’Connor. Between 1957 and 1976 there were two seats, Brunswick East and Brunswick West.

On 15 January 1908, Brunswick was proclaimed a city, and on 21 April 1921, it was divided into four wards; North East, North West, Central and South.

== Geography ==
The City of Brunswick was a stable geographic area from 1870 until 1994, comprising an area of 11.01 square kilometres (4.25 sq mi) bounded by the Moonee Ponds Creek to the west, the Merri Creek to the east, Moreland Road to the north and Park Street (one block south of Brunswick Road), Nicholson Street and May Street to the south. The boundaries enclosed the suburbs of Brunswick West, Brunswick and Brunswick East, and also included a 15-hectare (37-acre) strip of Fitzroy North, along Glenlyon Road.

== Demographics ==
The 1991 census conducted by the Australian Bureau of Statistics identified 39,779 persons resident in the City of Brunswick.

Historical populations for the City of Brunswick are shown in the table below. Figures from 1911 onwards, with the exceptions of 1958 and 1986, reflect census figures.:

| Year | Population |
|---|---|
| 1846 | 146 |
| 1861 | 3,014 |
| 1881 | 6,222 |
| 1901 | 24,141 |
| 1911 | 32,215 |
| 1921 | 44,484 |
| 1928 | 55,799 |
| 1933 | 54,348 |
| 1947 | 57,546 |
| 1954 | 53,620 |
| 1958 | 51,500* |
| 1961 | 53,093 |
| 1966 | 52,030 |
| 1971 | 51,560 |
| 1976 | 46,192 |
| 1981 | 44,464 |
| 1986 | 41,362 |
| 1991 | 39,886 |

* Yearbook estimates.
