= Mary Rogers (politician) =

Australian magistrate and trade unionist (1872–1932)

Councillor of the City of Richmond
- In office 5 November 1920 – August 1925

Personal details
- Born: Mary Skeahan; 2 August 1872 Melbourne, Australia
- Died: 25 September 1932 (aged 60) Richmond, Victoria, Australia
- Resting place: Boroondara General Cemetery
- Party: Labor
- Spouse: Patrick Rogers (died 1910)
- Children: 5

Mary Catherine Rogers (born Mary Skeahan, 2 August 1872 − 25 September 1932) was an Australian magistrate, trade unionist, and the first woman elected to local government in Victoria.

== Early years ==
Rogers was raised in East Melbourne, and attended a local Catholic school. She married Patrick Denis Rogers in 1900 and had five children, although one died in infancy.

After her husband died in 1910, Rogers initially worked as a cleaner, before being appointed secretary, then president, of the Women Office Cleaners' Union, and later vice-president of the Miscellaneous Workers' Union.

== Political career ==
Rogers became an organiser for the Australian Labor Party in 1918, serving as secretary of the party's North Richmond branch for several years.

On 5 November 1920, she was elected to Richmond City Council at a by-election, becoming he first woman elected to local government in Victoria, and the second in Australia (after Susan Benny).

Rogers was re-elected unopposed in 1922. In 1925, she became a member of the council's finance and legislative committee, but was at the elections in August later that year.

== Later life and death ==
In 1928, she became one of first women to be appointed a justice of the peace in Victoria, serving as a special magistrate at the Children's Court at Richmond.

Rogers died of cancer on 25 September 1932, and was buried at Boroondara Cemetery in Kew. Future federal Labor leader Arthur Calwell was a pallbearer at her funeral, where several prominent Labor and trade union officials were present.

== Legacy ==
In March 2016, the City of Yarra (the successor to the City of Richmond) replaced the green and male silhouettes at traffic lights with a likeness of Rogers.

Mary Rogers Square on the corner of Church Street and Bridge Road in Richmond is named after Rogers.
