= City of Coburg =

Coordinates: 37°44′17″S 144°58′55″E

City of Coburg Victoria
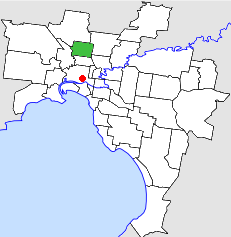
- Location in Melbourne
- The extent of the City of Coburg at its dissolution in 1994
- Population: 52,500 (1992)
  - Density: 2,701/km^{2} (6,995/sq mi)
- Established: 1856
- Area: 19.44 km^{2} (7.5 sq mi)
- Council seat: Coburg
- Region: Northern Melbourne
- County: Bourke
LGAs around City of Coburg:
Broadmeadows	Broadmeadows	Preston
Essendon	City of Coburg	Preston
Essendon	Brunswick	Northcote

The City of Coburg was a local government area about 10 kilometres (6 mi) north of Melbourne, the state capital of Victoria, Australia. The city covered an area of 19.44 square kilometres (7.51 sq mi), and existed from 1859 until 1994.

== History ==
Initial efforts at local government saw the Sydney Road Trust set up in 1840, which boasted John Fawkner as a founding member, but the first incorporation in the area was the Pentridge District Road Board in 1859, which was renamed Coburg on 21 January 1869, after a Royal visit from Prince Alfred, Duke of Saxe-Coburg and Gotha. It became a shire on 24 December 1874, before increasing urbanisation in the late 19th century led to it being reclassified a borough in January 1905. Coburg then became a town on 18 September 1912, and was proclaimed a city on 29 March 1922.

Between 1947 and 1981, the percentage of overseas-born residents of the City of Coburg increased from 9% to 34%, with significant proportions being of Italian or Greek origins.

On 22 June 1994, the City of Coburg was abolished, and along with the City of Brunswick, was merged into the newly created City of Moreland (now City of Merri-bek). A tiny strip on the eastern boundary was transferred to the newly created City of Darebin, which incorporated the Cities of Preston and Northcote.

Council meetings were held at the Coburg City Hall, on Bell Street, Coburg. The hall is still used for this purpose by the City of Merri-bek.

== Wards ==
The City of Coburg was divided into four wards, each electing three councillors:

- East Ward
- West Ward
- North Ward
- Central Ward

== Suburbs ==
- Coburg*
- Coburg North
- Pascoe Vale (shared with the City of Broadmeadows)
- Pascoe Vale South

* Council seat.

== Population ==
Year	Population
1861	1,033
1891	5,272
1911	9,505
1933	33,118
1954	62,077
1958	68,900*
1961	70,771
1966	68,578
1971	65,662
1976	58,379
1981	55,035
1986	52,885
1991	50,625

* Estimate in the 1958 Victorian Year Book.
