= City of Northcote =

Coordinates: 37°46′S 145°00′E

- Local government area
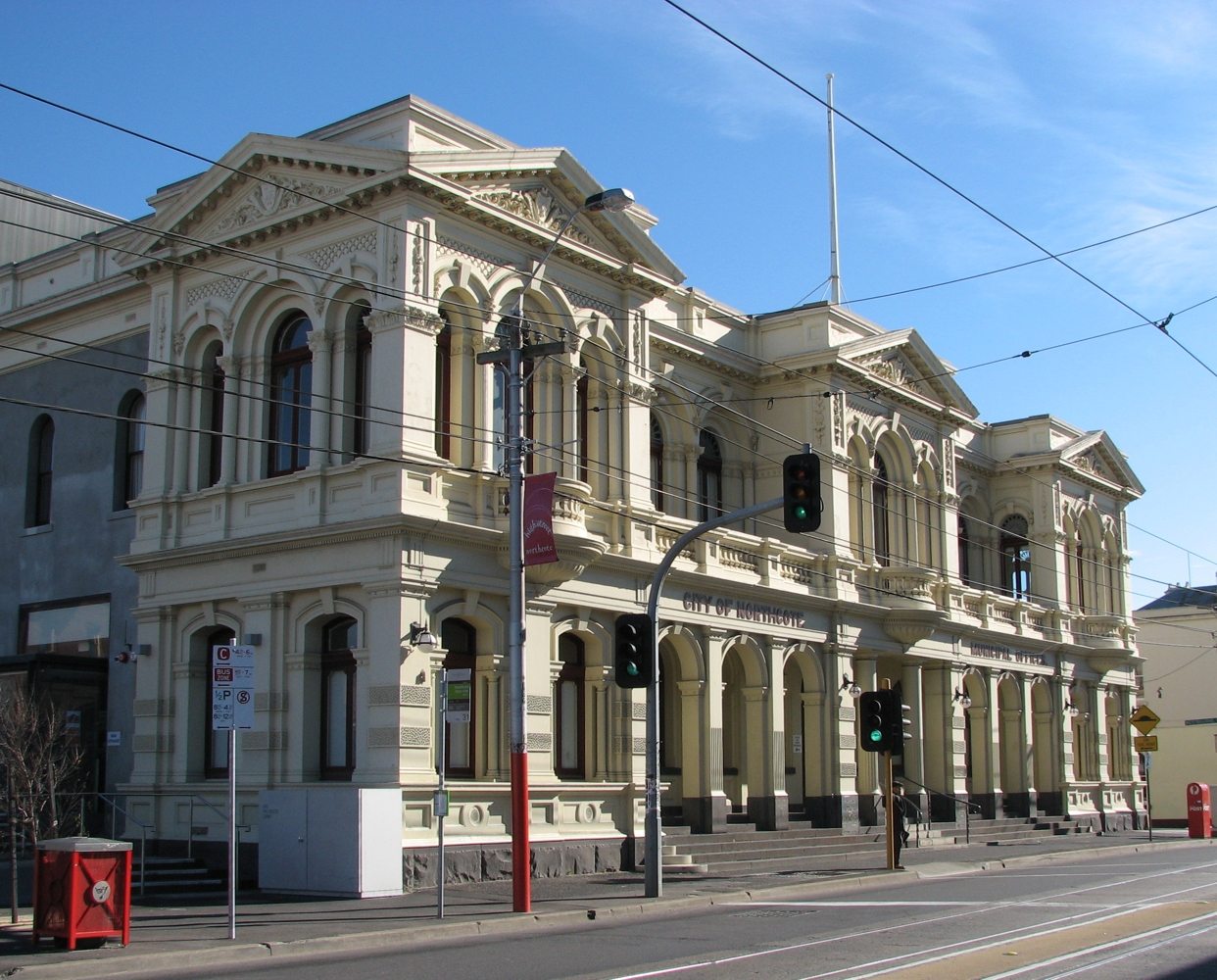
- Northcote Town Hall

- The extent of the City of Northcote at its dissolution in 1994
- Country: Australia
- State: Victoria
- Region: Northeastern Melbourne
- Established: 1883
- Council seat: Northcote

Area
  - Total: 17.62 km^{2} (6.80 sq mi)

Population
  - Total: 49,200 (1992)
  - Density: 2,792/km^{2} (7,232/sq mi)
- County: Bourke
LGAs around City of Northcote
Coburg	Preston	Heidelberg
Brunswick	City of Northcote	Heidelberg
Fitzroy	Collingwood	Kew

The City of Northcote was a local government area about 5 kilometres (3 mi) northeast of Melbourne, the state capital of Victoria, Australia. The city covered an area of 17.62 square kilometres (6.80 sq mi), and existed from 1883 until 1994.

== History ==
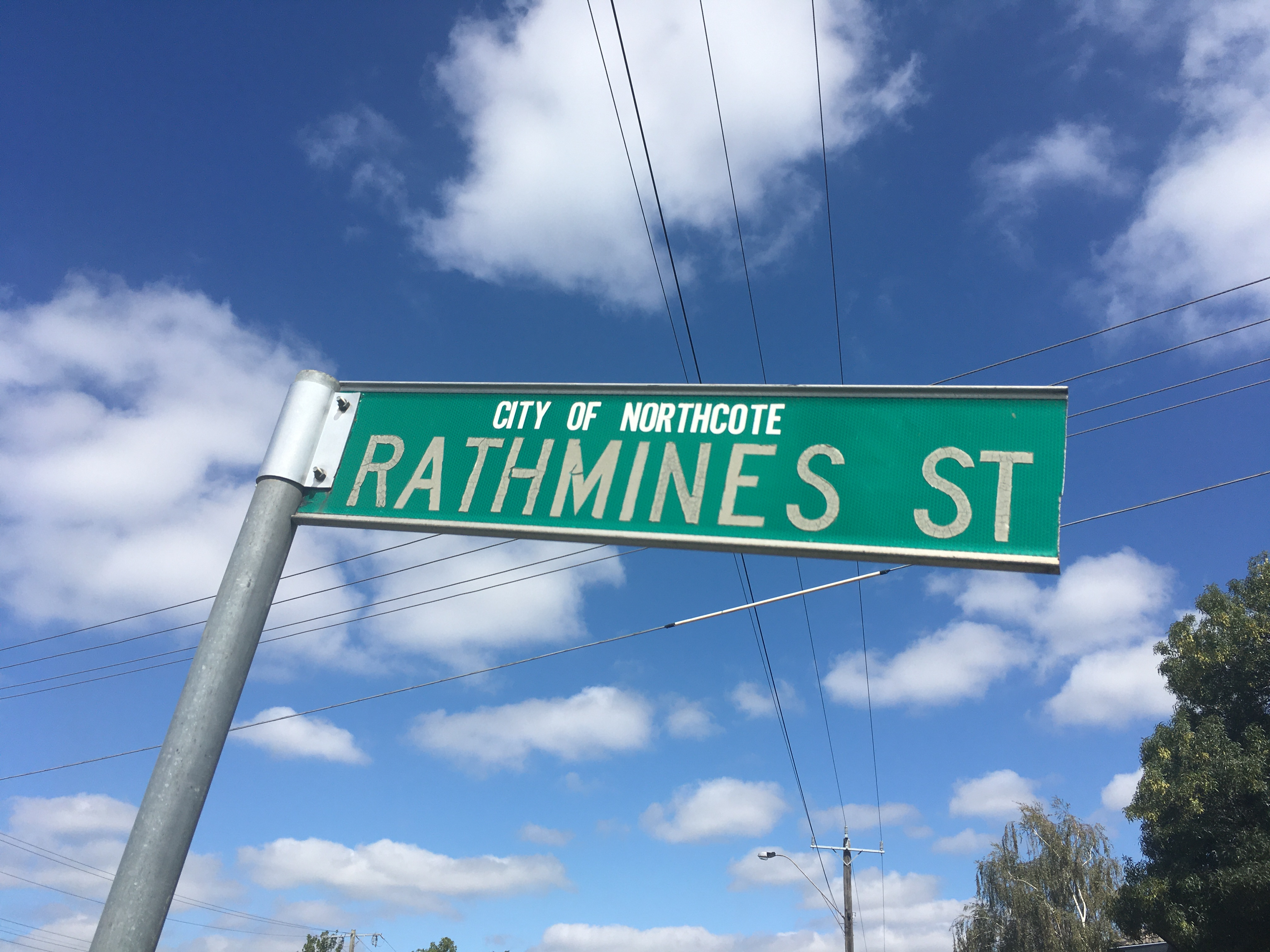
Street sign for Rathmines Street with 'City of Northcote' printed on top in the suburb of Northcote.

Prior to the 1880s land boom, Northcote had been part of the Jika Jika Shire, which also included the City of Preston. Northcote was severed and incorporated as a borough on 25 May 1883. It became a town on 12 September 1890, and was proclaimed a city on 8 April 1914. On 1 October 1962, it annexed the South Ward of the City of Heidelberg.

Council elections in Northcote were generally contested, at least from the 1940s onwards, by candidates supported on the one hand by local business people, standing as Independents, and candidates endorsed by the Labor Party (ALP) on the other. The ALP came to dominate Northcote Council politics after the early 1950s, and the majority of candidates were returned without opposition until the late 1970s. The ALP was slow to endorse migrant candidates, but it gradually did so as the population of the City of Northcote changed, with non-English speaking background immigrants an increasingly important factor in the council electorate.

Changes in the composition of Northcote Council saw more non-Anglo ethnic Councillors from the late 1970s, and certainly a swing to the political left. In 1980, strongly left-wing Councillors achieved national media coverage, as outspoken Victorian RSL President Bruce Ruxton condemned a number of Council policies that were anathema to those traditionally held by the RSL. These included the flying of the Eureka Flag, rather than the Australian flag, from the Northcote Town Hall, and support for an Australian republic. Ruxton claimed 'ethnics and anti-British elements' were responsible for a lack of patriotism. Ruxton was also incensed at the refusal of Scottish-born Councillor Brian Sanaghan, to renew his oath of allegiance to the Queen, after being re-elected to the Northcote Council in 1980. Pressure from Ruxton resulted in Sanaghan's place on the council being declared vacant.

Some friction occurred between members of non-Anglo ethnic groups and Northcote Councillors over the conduct of the City Librarian and library administrators in the 1950s and 1960s. The Council banned use of its "adult" library (as opposed to a separate children's library) to residents under the age of fourteen. This practice was rigidly enforced by Council library staff. A Northcote Library Apology Committee was formed in 1985. It unsuccessfully sought an apology for what it argued was a practice that prevented Northcote children from reading, among other things, many of the great works of classical literature. The dispute occurred at a time the ALP in Northcote was no longer able to control the City with minimal opposition.

A threat to the ALP's dominant position on the Northcote Council appeared in May 1988, with the defection of up to 60 members from the party's Greek Westgarth branch, including Cr John Gogas, defecting to the Australian Democrats. George Gogas, the tram-conductor father of John Gogas and a former Northcote Councillor, contested the 1990 Federal Election as a Democrat candidate for the Division of Batman, against Deputy Prime Minister Brian Howe, the sitting member. Gogas polled only 12.9 per cent of the vote.

The City of Northcote elected Victoria's first Italo-Australian Mayor, Tony Matisi, in 1969 and Australia's first Italo-Australian woman Mayor, Lidia Argondizzo, in 1989. Argondizzo later became a member of the Victorian parliament. Italians did not, however, achieve representation on Northcote Council in large numbers. Greeks certainly did so after the election of the first Greek-Australian to the council, in the late 1970s.

Northcote produced twelve Greek councillors, the first being Peter Tsitas in 1977. Socrates Papadopoulos followed, and he became Victoria's first Greek-Australian Mayor in 1983. Emily Dimitracopoulos, as well as being a Councillor, also served as Vice-President of the Victorian ALP. Other Greek-Australians who were elected as ALP endorsed candidates were Teena Cross, Con Sakis, George Gogas, John Gogas, Maria Vamvakinou, Andy Mylonas and Jenny Mikakos. Vamvakinou was later elected to the federal parliament for the House of Representatives electorate of Calwell, and Mikakos was later elected to the upper house of the Victorian parliament. Jim Karmis and Angela Kotsiras served as Independent non-party members of the council. Kotsiras is the wife of Nicholas Kotsiras, the Liberal Victorian lower house member of parliament for Bulleen, between 1999-2014.

On 22 June 1994, the City of Northcote was abolished, and along with the City of Preston, was merged into the newly created City of Darebin. Parts of the suburbs of Alphington and Fairfield (south of Heidelberg Road) were transferred into the newly created City of Yarra.

Council meetings were held at the Northcote Town Hall, on High Street, Northcote. It is still in use as secondary council offices for the City of Darebin.

== Wards ==
On 31 March 1981, the City of Northcote was subdivided into four wards, each electing three councillors:

- Merri Ward
- Cain Ward
- Darebin Ward
- Yarra Ward

== Suburbs ==
- Alphington
- Fairfield
- Northcote*
- Thornbury

* Council seat.

== Population ==
Year	Population
1891	7,100
1911	17,519
1921	30,519
1954	43,604
1958	42,800*
1961	44,746+
1966	56,179+
1971	59,303
1976	54,881
1981	51,235
1986	48,552
1991	46,547

* Estimate in the 1958 Victorian Year Book.
+ The sudden jump in 1966 arises in part from the annexation of the South Ward of the City of Heidelberg. The 1961 population of the combined area was 55,750.

== Gallery ==
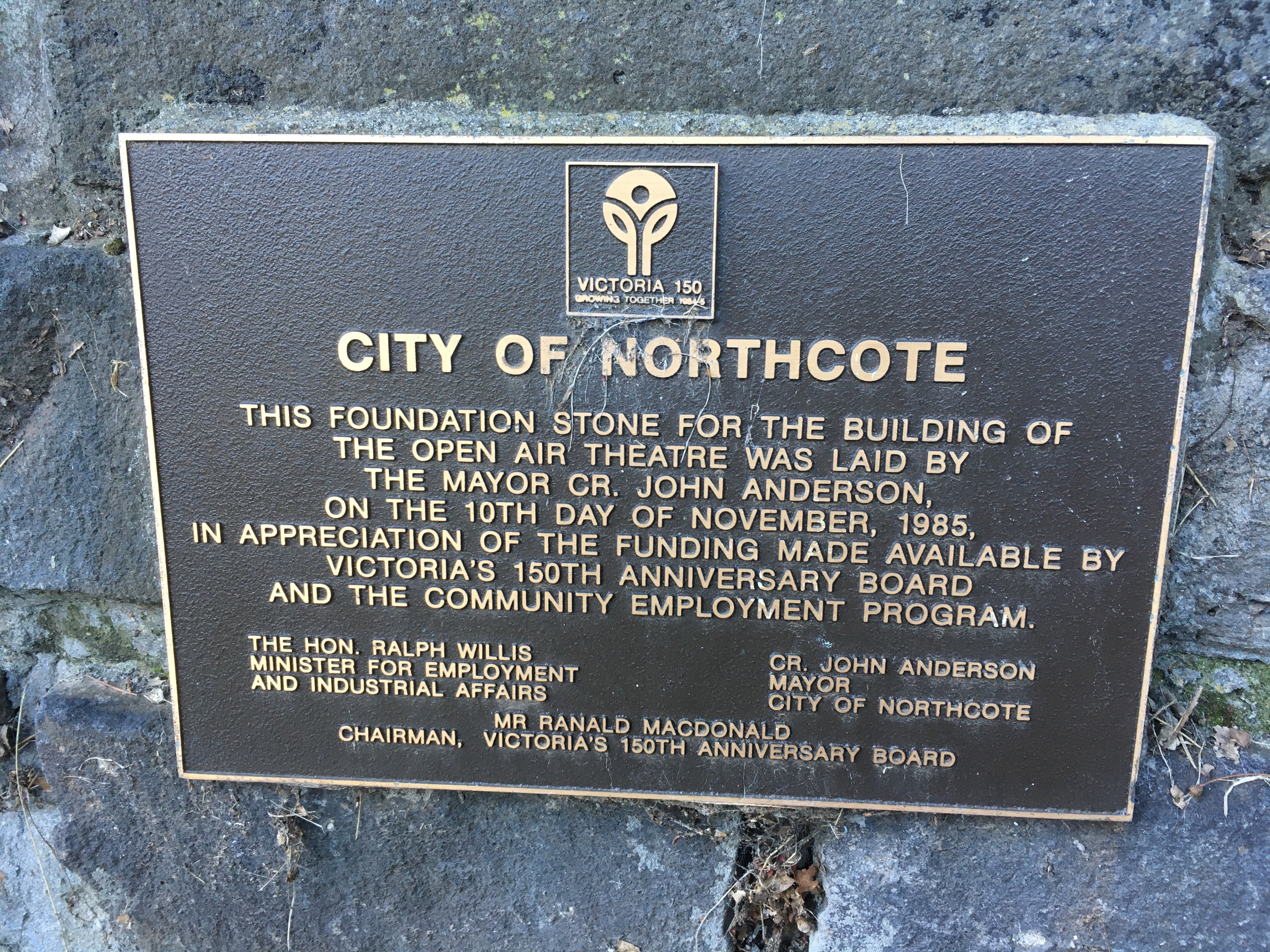
City of Northcote plaque commemorating opening of Yarra Amphitheatre in Fairfield Park, Fairfield.

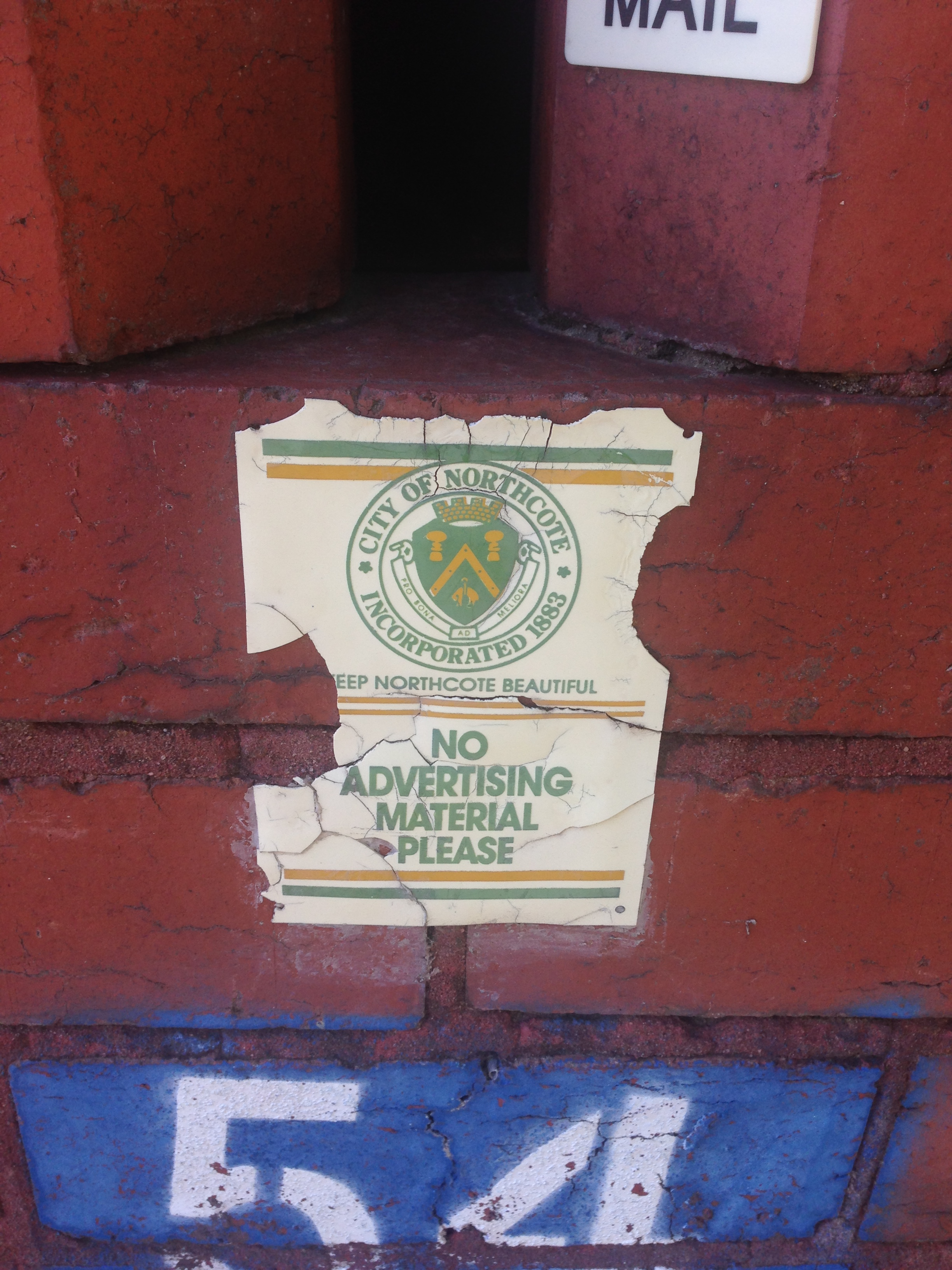
Crest of the City of Northcote visible on a letterbox sticker.

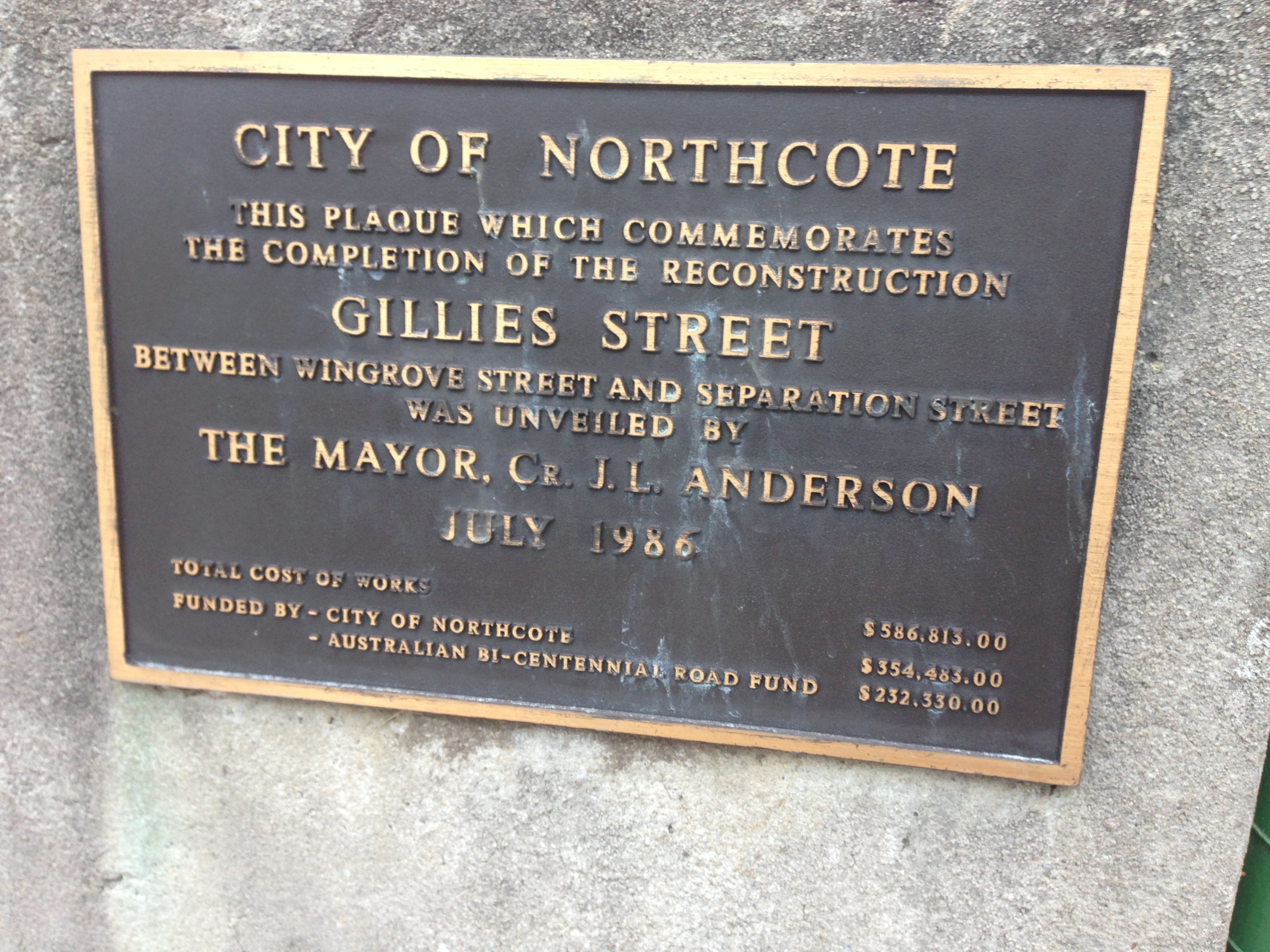
City of Northcote plaque commemorating reconstruction of Gillies Street in Fairfield in 1986.
