= City of Richmond =

Coordinates: 37.823°S 144.998°E

- Local government area
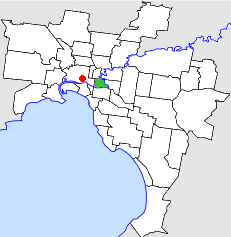
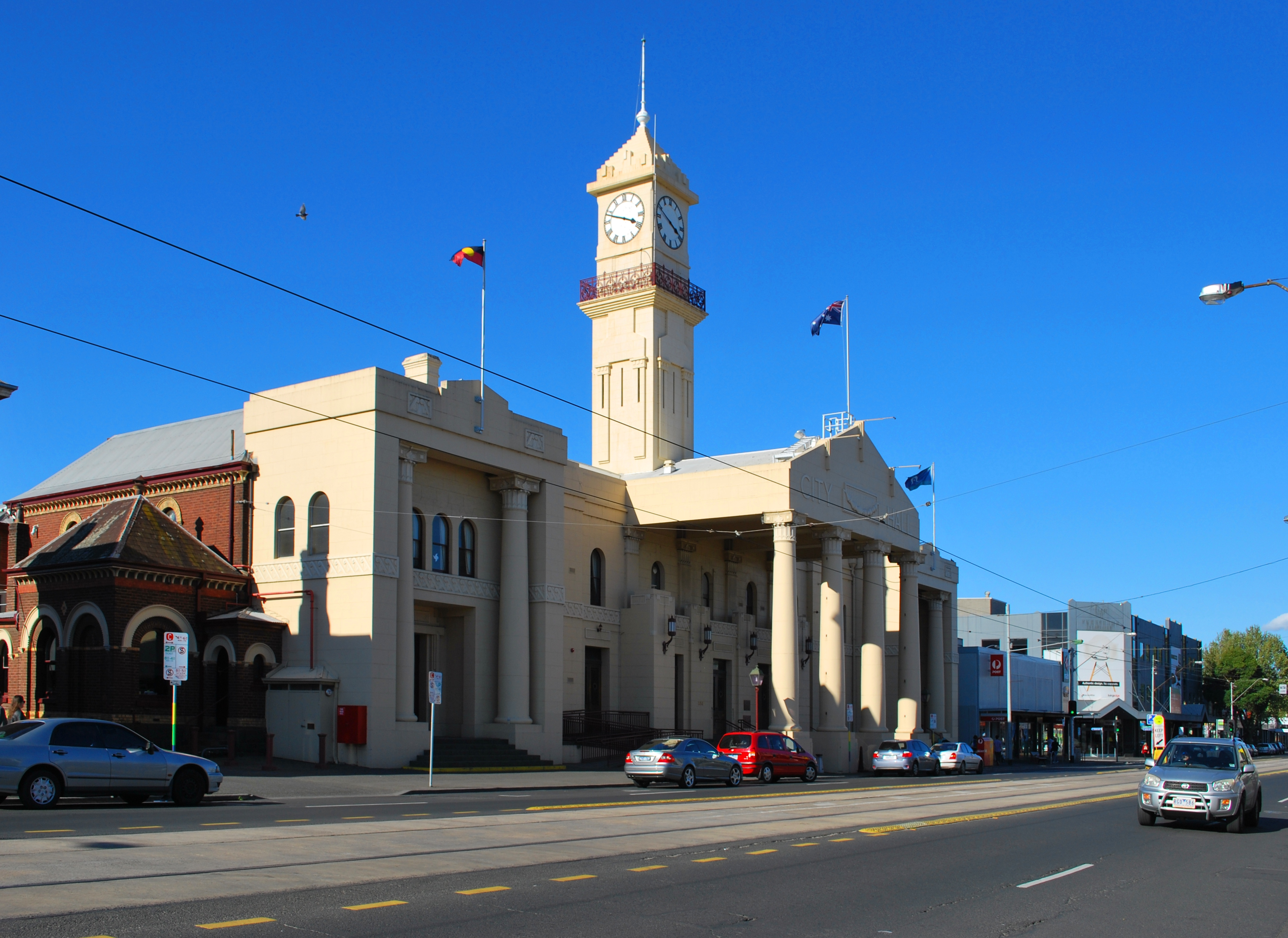
- Location in Melbourne Richmond Town Hall

- The extent of the City of Richmond at its dissolution in 1994
- Country: Australia
- State: Victoria
- Region: Inner Melbourne
- Established: 1855
- Council seat: Richmond

Area
  - Total: 6.12 km^{2} (2.36 sq mi)

Population
  - Total(s): 22,900 (1992)
  - Density: 3,742/km^{2} (9,691/sq mi)
- County: Bourke
LGAs around City of Richmond
Collingwood	Northcote	Kew
Melbourne	City of Richmond	Hawthorn
Melbourne	Prahran	Malvern

The City of Richmond was a local government area about 2 kilometres (1 mi) east of Melbourne, the state capital of Victoria, Australia. The city covered an area of 6.12 square kilometres (2.36 sq mi), and existed from 1855 until 1994.

== History ==
Richmond was incorporated as a municipality on 24 April 1855, having split from the City of Melbourne on the same day as the neighbouring City of Collingwood. It became a town on 28 September 1872, and a city on 17 February 1882.

In 1920, it became the first municipal council in Australia to have a female councillor, when Mary Rogers of the Labor Party was elected.

The Richmond council was sacked in 1982 by the State Government following a report which revealed allegations of electoral malpractice and fraud. The council was replaced by a state-appointed commissioner, Alex Gillon, to administer the city in its stead until an elected council was restored in 1988.

On 22 June 1994, the City of Richmond was abolished, and along with the Cities of Collingwood and Fitzroy, and parts of Fairfield and Alphington from the City of Northcote, was merged into the newly created City of Yarra.

Richmond was at one stage divided into wards, but by 1994 the council was represented by nine councillors, each representing all electors in the city. Meetings were held at the Richmond Town Hall, on Bridge Road, Richmond.

== Election results ==
=== East ===
1931 Victorian local elections: East Ward
Party	Candidate	Votes	%	±%
Labor	Geoffrey O'Connell	599	82.17	
Communist	C. H. Frank	130	17.83	
Total formal votes		729		
Labor hold		Swing		

=== North ===
1931 Victorian local elections: North Ward
Party	Candidate	Votes	%	±%
Labor	R. H. Lightfoot	879	61.00	
Independent	W. L. Podmore	562	39.00	
Total formal votes		1,441		
Labor hold		Swing		

== Suburbs ==
- Burnley
- Cremorne
- Richmond*

* Council seat.

== Population ==
Year	Population
1854	7,071
1881	23,405
1911	40,442
1954	35,213
1958	33,100*
1961	33,863
1966	32,521
1971	28,341
1976	26,179
1981	24,506
1986	23,285
1991	22,789

* Estimate in the 1958 Victorian Year Book.
