= City of Preston (Victoria) =

Coordinates: 37°44′35″S 145°00′29″E

- Local government area
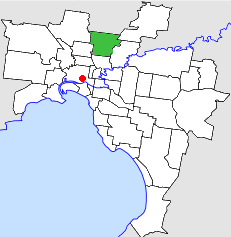
- Location in Melbourne

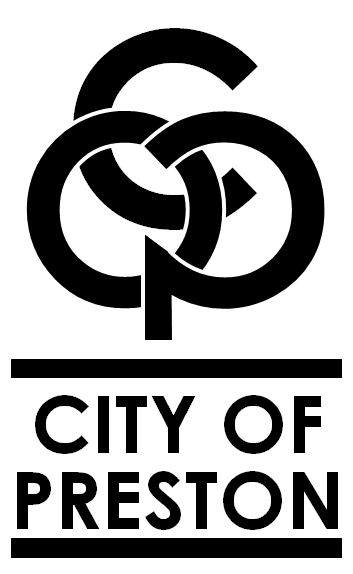
- The City of Preston as at its dissolution in 1994
- Country: Australia
- State: Victoria
- Region: Northern Melbourne
- Established: 1871
- Council seat: Preston

Area
  - Total: 37.05 km^{2} (14.31 sq mi)

Population
  - Total: 79,700 (1992)
  - Density: 2,151.1/km^{2} (5,571/sq mi)
- County: Bourke
LGAs around City of Preston
Broadmeadows	Whittlesea	Diamond Valley
Broadmeadows	City of Preston	Heidelberg
Coburg	Northcote	Heidelberg

The City of Preston was a local government area about 11 kilometres (7 mi) north-northeast of Melbourne, the state capital of Victoria, Australia. The city covered an area of 37.05 square kilometres (14.31 sq mi), and existed from 1871 until 1994.

== History ==
Preston's first involvement in local government was part of the Epping Road District in 1854, which also included Northcote. In 1870, the Epping District was amalgamated with the Merriang, Whittlesea, Morang and Woodstock Road Districts, to form a very large Darebin Shire. These entities mostly ended up in the Cities of Broadmeadows and Whittlesea.

Preston was first incorporated as the Jika Jika Shire on 8 November 1871, which was renamed Preston on 11 September 1885. It became a borough on 14 March 1922, a town on 24 May 1922, and was proclaimed a city on 14 July 1926.

On 22 June 1994, the City of Preston was abolished, and along with the City of Northcote and parts of the City of Coburg, was merged into the City of Darebin.

Council meetings were held at Preston City Hall, at High Street and Gower Street, Preston. It is still used for the same purpose by the City of Darebin.

== Wards ==
The City of Preston was subdivided into four wards, each electing three councillors:

- South East Ward
- South West Ward
- North East Ward
- North West Ward

== Suburbs ==
- Bundoora (shared with the City of Whittlesea and the Shire of Diamond Valley)
- Kingsbury
- Preston*
- Reservoir

* Council seat.

== Population ==
Year	Population
1911	5,049
1933	33,442
1947	46,775
1954	63,868
1958	77,300*
1961	84,146
1966	89,706
1971	91,584
1976	88,384
1981	84,519
1986	79,751
1991	76,996

* Estimate in the 1958 Victorian Year Book.

== Gallery ==
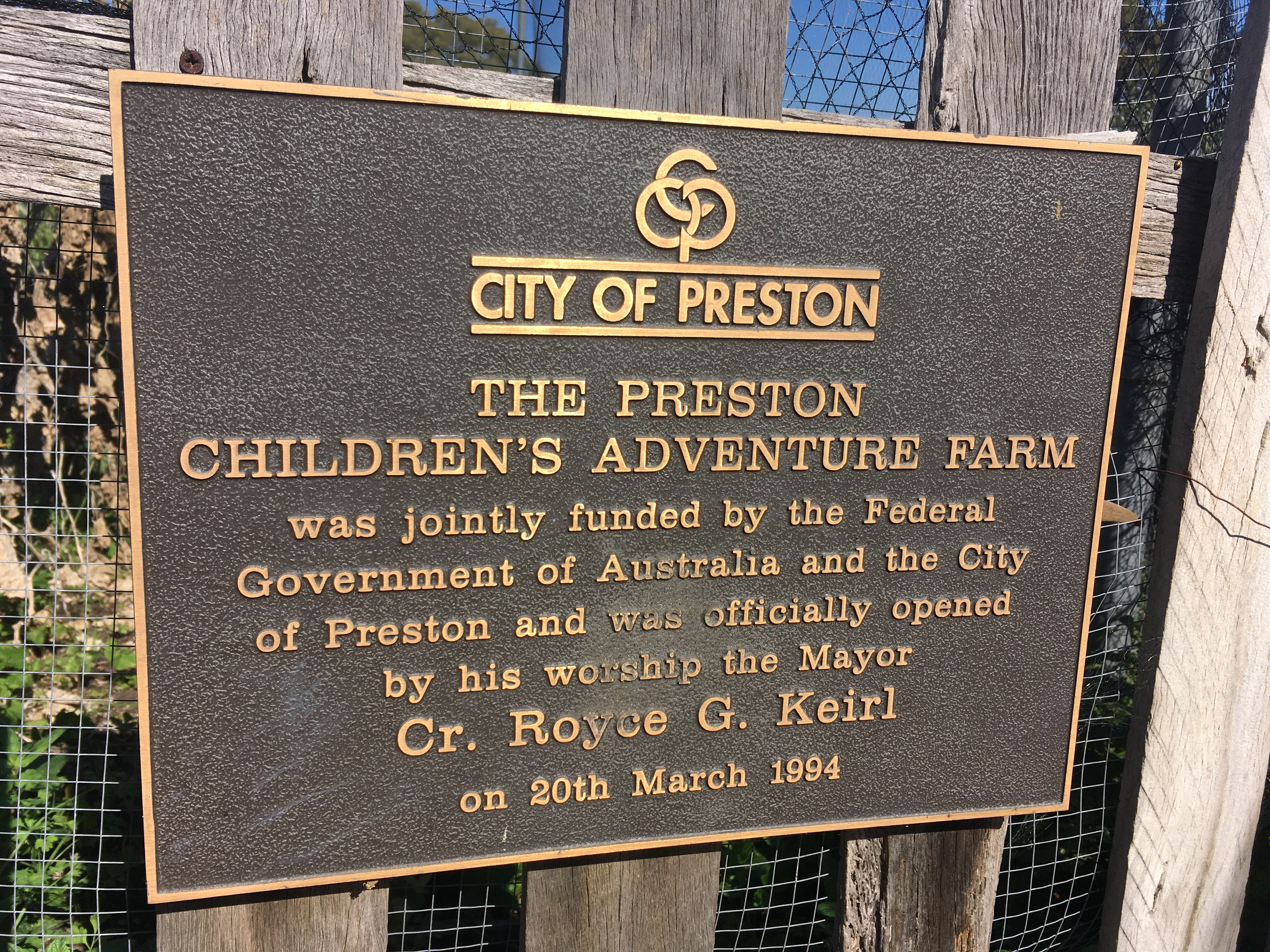
City of Preston plaque commemorating March 1994 opening of Bundoora Park Farm.

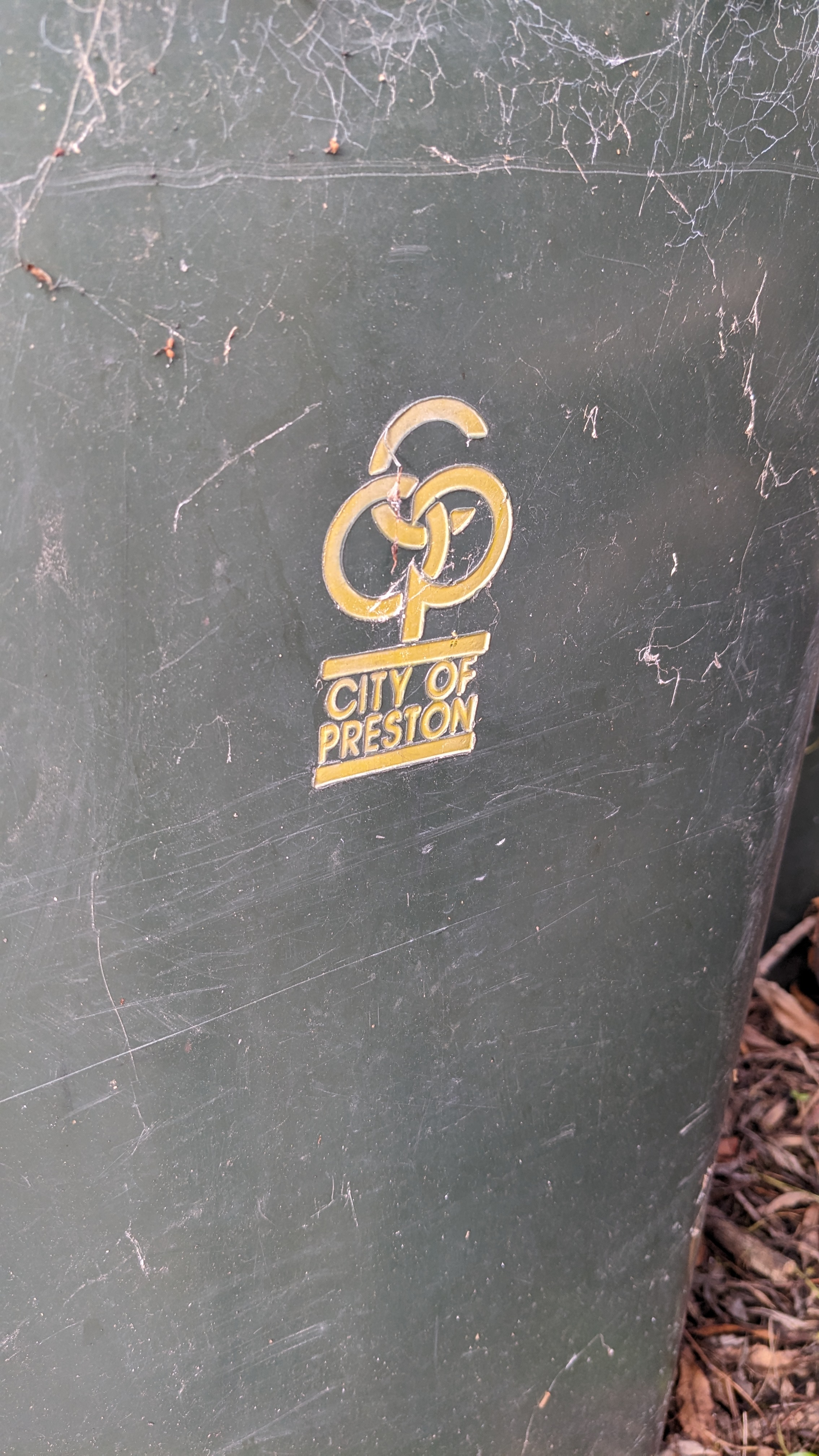
City of Preston 1990s logo visible on side of wheelie bin.
