= City of Collingwood =

Coordinates: 37°48′11″S 144°59′17″E

City of Collingwood Victoria
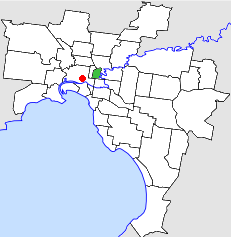
- Location in Melbourne
- The extent of the City of Collingwood at its dissolution in 1994
- Population: 14,000 (1992)
  - Density: 3,130/km^{2} (8,090/sq mi)
- Established: 1855
- Area: 4.48 km^{2} (1.7 sq mi)
- Council seat: Collingwood
- Region: Inner Melbourne
- County: Bourke
LGAs around City of Collingwood:
Fitzroy	Northcote	Northcote
Fitzroy	City of Collingwood	Kew
Melbourne	Melbourne; Richmond	Richmond

The City of Collingwood was a local government area about 3 kilometres (2 mi) east-northeast of Melbourne, the state capital of Victoria, Australia. The city covered an area of 4.48 square kilometres (1.73 sq mi), and existed from 1855 until 1994.

== History ==
Collingwood was first incorporated as a district on 24 April 1855, having split from the City of Melbourne on the same day as the neighbouring City of Richmond. It was split into two boroughs — Collingwood and East Collingwood — in 1863, which became towns on 23 May 1873 and 21 April 1873 respectively. They recombined into the City of Collingwood on 14 January 1876.

On 22 June 1994, the City of Collingwood was abolished, and along with the Cities of Fitzroy and Richmond, and parts of Fairfield and Alphington from the City of Northcote, was merged into the newly created City of Yarra.

Council meetings were held at the Collingwood Town Hall, on Hoddle Street, Abbotsford.

== Wards ==
The City of Collingwood was divided into three wards on 31 May 1887, each electing three councillors:

- Abbotsford Ward
- Clifton Hill Ward
- Collingwood Ward

== Suburbs ==
- Abbotsford
- Clifton Hill
- Collingwood*

* Council seat.

== Population ==
Year	Population
1857	10,786
1881	23,829
1921	34,239
1954	27,155
1958	26,000*
1961	25,413
1966	22,447
1971	21,022
1976	16,645
1981	15,089
1986	13,340
1991	13,388

* Estimate in the 1958 Victorian Year Book.
