= City of Fitzroy =

Coordinates: 37°48′04″S 144°58′44″E

- Local government area
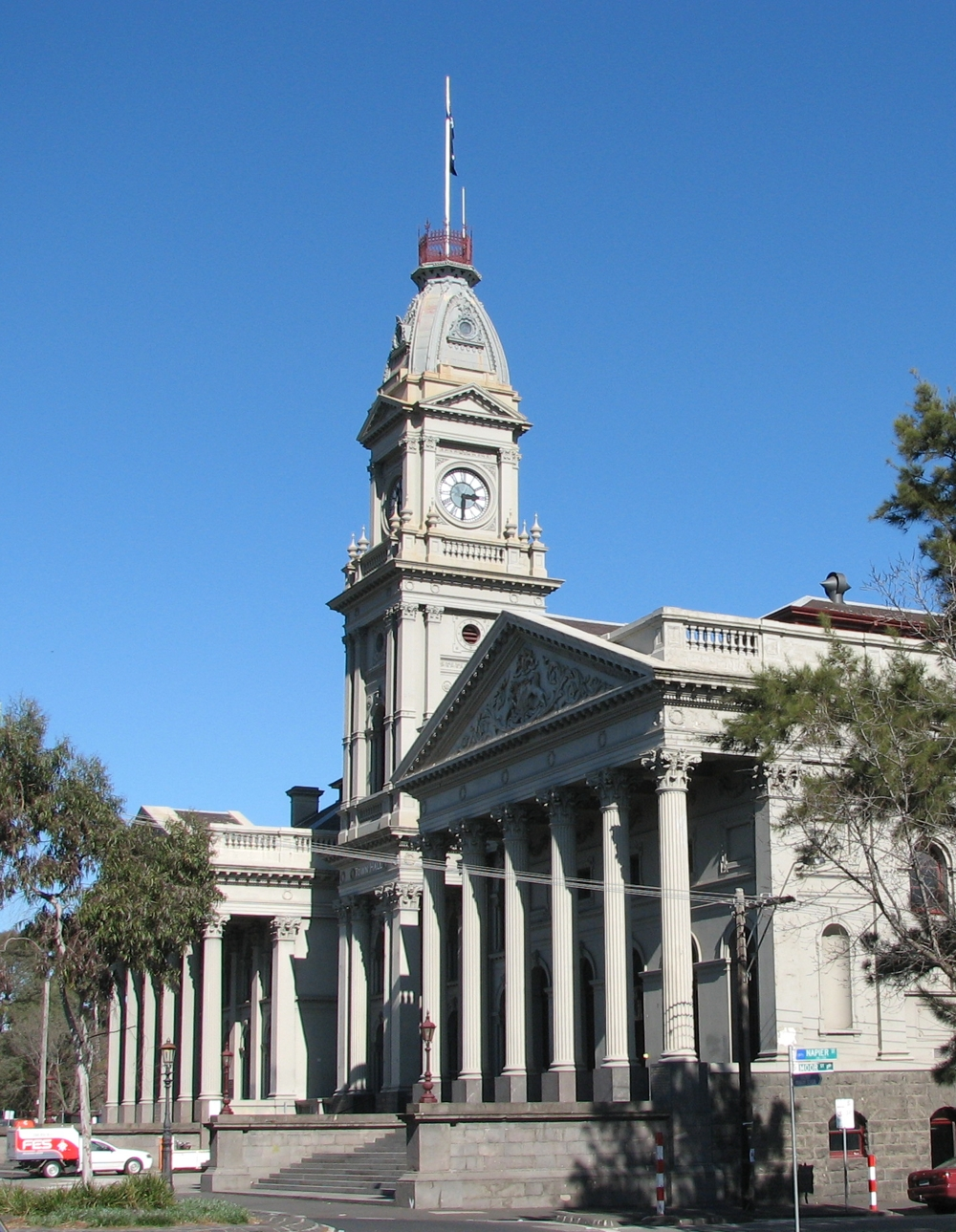
- Fitzroy Town Hall

- The extent of the City of Fitzroy until November 1993
- Country: Australia
- State: Victoria
- Region: Inner Melbourne
- Established: 1858
- Council seat: Fitzroy

Area
  - Total: 3.73 km^{2} (1.44 sq mi)

Population
  - Total(s): 17,600 (1992)
  - Density: 4,718/km^{2} (12,220/sq mi)
- County: Bourke
LGAs around City of Fitzroy
Brunswick	Brunswick	Northcote
Melbourne	City of Fitzroy	Collingwood
Melbourne	Melbourne	Melbourne

The City of Fitzroy was a local government area about 2 kilometres (1 mi) northeast of Melbourne, the state capital of Victoria, Australia. The city covered an area of 3.73 square kilometres (1.44 sq mi), making it the smallest municipality by land area in Victoria, and existed from 1858 until 1994.

== History ==
In 1850, the area was made the Fitzroy Ward of the City of Melbourne, and on 10 September 1858, the ward was severed and Fitzroy was incorporated as a municipality. It became a borough on 1 October 1865, a town on 3 December 1870, and a city on 1 February 1878. Many public buildings were erected at this time, with the free public library, one of the first in Melbourne, being erected in 1877, and a courthouse in 1888.

During the mid-1920s, there was a strong move to have the Fitzroy municipality amalgamate with the City of Melbourne. Three referendums on the matter were held in the space of 18 months: on 24 June and 20 August 1926, and 24 November 1927. In each case, ratepayers voted in favour of amalgamation, however a determined rearguard action by councillors opposed to the merger meant that no change occurred.

On 22 June 1994, the City of Fitzroy was abolished, and along with the Cities of Collingwood and Richmond, and parts of Fairfield and Alphington from the City of Northcote, was merged into the newly created City of Yarra.

Council meetings were held at the Fitzroy Town Hall, in Napier Street, Fitzroy. The hall is still used for this purpose and as a municipal library for the City of Yarra.

== Wards ==
Fitzroy was historically divided into five wards, each electing three councillors. However, on 25 November 1986, the wards were reduced from five to three:

- North Ward
- Clifton Ward
- South Ward

== Suburbs ==
- Fitzroy*
- Fitzroy North
- Carlton North (shared with the City of Melbourne)

* Council seat.

== Population ==
Year	Population
1861	11,807
1881	23,118
1921	34,938
1954	30,312
1958	29,300*
1961	29,399
1966	27,213
1971	25,708
1976	20,451
1981	19,112
1986	18,163
1991	17,885

* Estimate in the 1958 Victorian Year Book.
