= City of Heidelberg =

Coordinates: 37°46′S 145°03′E

- Local government area
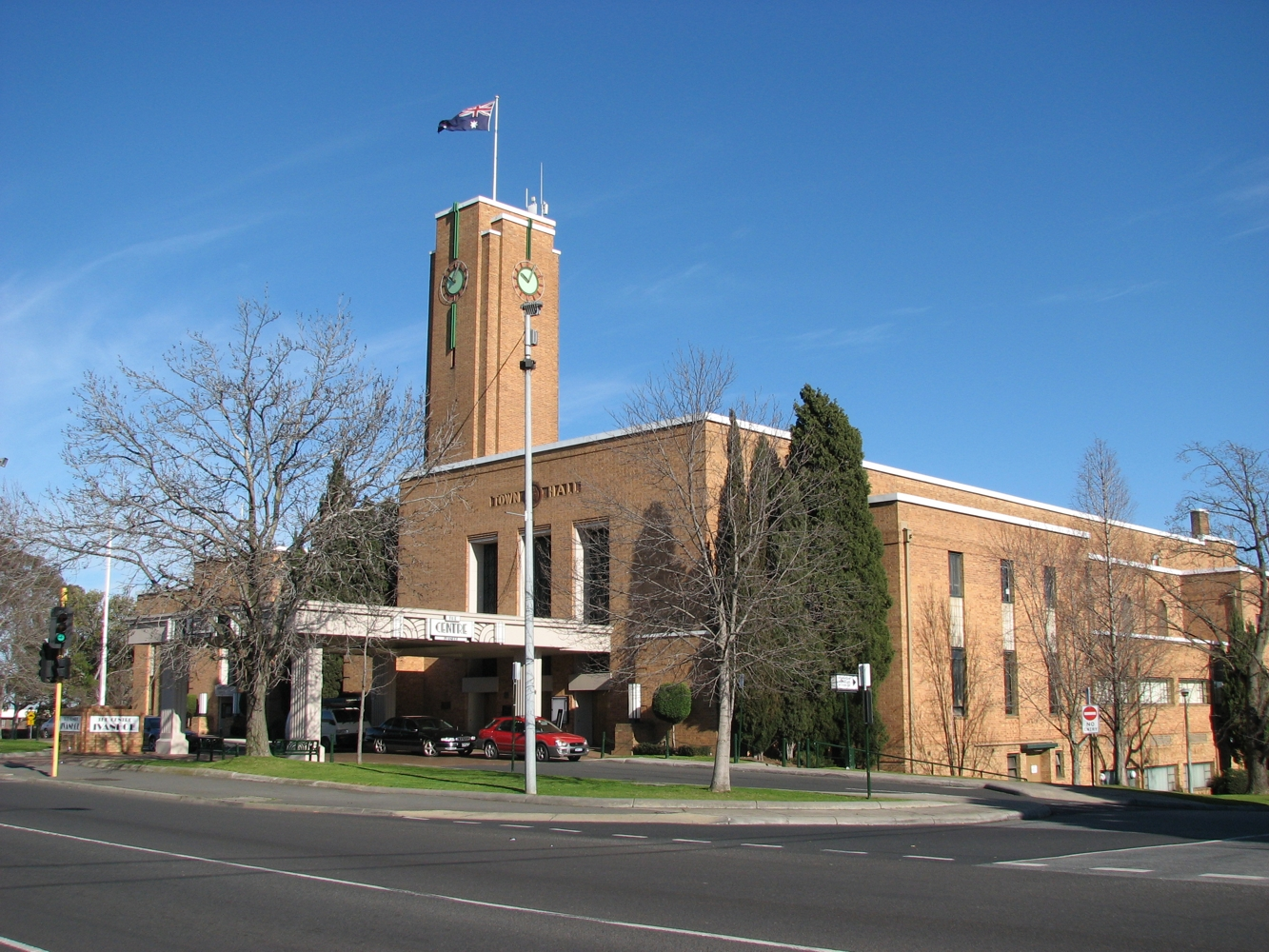
- Heidelberg Town Hall

- The extent of the City of Heidelberg at its dissolution in 1994
- Country: Australia
- State: Victoria
- Region: Northeastern Melbourne
- Established: 1840
- Council seat: Ivanhoe

Area
  - Total: 34.08 km^{2} (13.16 sq mi)

Population
  - Total(s): 62,800 (1992)
  - Density: 1,842.7/km^{2} (4,773/sq mi)
- County: Bourke
LGAs around City of Heidelberg
Preston	Diamond Valley	Eltham
Preston	City of Heidelberg	Doncaster & Templestowe
Northcote	Kew	Camberwell

The City of Heidelberg was a local government area about 10 kilometres (6 mi) northeast of Melbourne, the state capital of Victoria, Australia. The city covered an area of 34.08 square kilometres (13.16 sq mi), and existed from 1840 until 1994.

== History ==
Heidelberg was first incorporated as a trust in 1840, making it one of the earliest local government formations in Australia. On 12 October 1860, it became a road district, administered by a Roads Board. It became a shire on 27 January 1871, and was proclaimed a city on 11 April 1934. In the 1960s, it lost significant sections of its territory; on 1 October 1962, the neighbouring City of Northcote annexed its South Ward, and on 30 September 1964, the Shire of Diamond Valley was created out of its mostly rural North Ward.

On 15 December 1994, the City of Heidelberg was abolished, and along with parts of the Shires of Diamond Valley and Eltham, was merged into the newly created City of Banyule. A small area near La Trobe University was transferred to the City of Darebin.

Council meetings were held at the Heidelberg Town Hall, on Upper Heidelberg Road, Ivanhoe. It is still used for the same purpose by the City of Banyule.

== Wards ==
The City of Heidelberg was subdivided into five wards, each electing three councillors:

- Banyule Ward
- Eaglemont Ward
- Heidelberg West Ward
- Ivanhoe Ward
- Macleod Ward

== Suburbs ==
- Bellfield
- Eaglemont
- Heidelberg
- Heidelberg Heights
- Heidelberg West
- Ivanhoe*
- Ivanhoe East
- Macleod (shared with the Shire of Diamond Valley)
- Rosanna
- Viewbank
- Yallambie

* Council seat.

== Population ==
Year	Population
1954	60,007
1958	77,000*+
1961	59,795
1966	63,810
1971	68,013
1976	66,108
1981	64,757
1986	62,717
1991	60,468
2011	118,305

* Estimate in the 1958 Victorian Year Book.
+ Includes the two sections severed in 1962-1964.
