= Fairfield, Victoria =

Fairfield
- Suburb
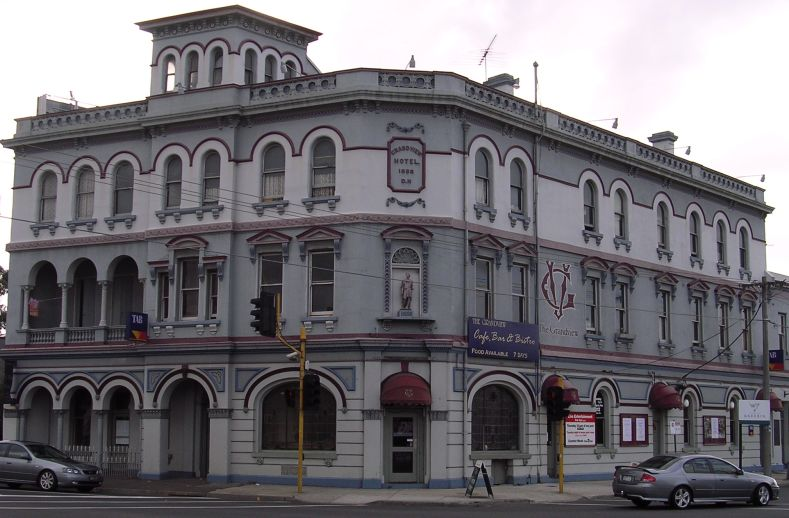
- Grandview Hotel built in 1888

- Interactive map of Fairfield
- Coordinates: 37.792°S 145.011°E
- Country: Australia
- State: Victoria
- City: Melbourne
- LGAs: City of Darebin; City of Yarra
- Location: 6 km (3.7 mi) NE of Melbourne

Government
  - State electorate: Northcote
  - Federal division: Cooper

Area
  - Total: 3.4 km^{2} (1.3 sq mi)
- Elevation: 37 m (121 ft)

Population
  - Total: 6,535 (SAL 2021)
- Postcode: 3078
Suburbs around Fairfield
Thornbury	Thornbury	Ivanhoe
Northcote	Fairfield	Alphington
Clifton Hill	Kew	Kew

Fairfield is an inner suburb in Melbourne, Victoria, Australia, 6 km (3.7 mi) north-east of Melbourne's Central Business District, located within the Cities of Darebin and Yarra local government areas. Fairfield recorded a population of 6,535 at the 2021 census.

Fairfield is bounded by Grange Road to the east, the Yarra River to the south, Darebin Road to the north and Northcote to the west.

== History ==
Fairfield gets its name from "Fairfield Park", an estate that was subdivided from large tracts of land that was brought by Charles Henry James, a land speculator. The name was alleged to have come from Derbyshire, England.

Fairfield Post Office opened on 21 February 1887. It has since relocated.

In 1962, Fairfield was part of the former City of Heidelberg. In that year, the suburb, along with Alphington, became part of the City of Northcote, which in 1994, became part of the City of Darebin.

== Commerce and culture ==
Fairfield is predominantly residential, with a small north-eastern pocket remaining a light industrial area.

A three-storey hotel, the Grandview Hotel, was completed in 1888, with its licence was granted by the Licensing Court on 15 August in that year. It has been known for hosting live music, and in the 1970s the Aboriginal country music band, the Country Outcasts, featuring Harry & Wilga Williams, had a residency there.

The Station Street shopping district currently has 89 businesses operating within it, with 23 cafes/bars/restaurants and 17 food and wine specialists.

Adjacent to the railway station, facing north-east, is the Fairfield Industrial Dog Object, a 6 m (20 ft) tall animatronic wooden dog.

== Demographics ==
In the 2021 census, the most common ancestries were English 33.3%, Australian 28.0%, Irish 16.0%, Scottish 11.7 and Italian 10.2%. 73.8% of people were born in Australia with other common countries of birth being England 3.2%, Greece 2.6%, Italy 1.8%, and New Zealand 1.4%. Most common languages, other than English spoken at home are Greek 5.5%, Italian 2.8%, Mandarin 1.1%, Spanish 1.1% and Vietnamese 1.0%.

Fairfield has significant Greek and Italian communities, with 10.3% and 8.8% of residents of the City of Darebin (which Fairfield is contained within) being of those ancestries respectively. There are also strong numbers of Chinese, Dutch, German and Indian residents in the suburb.

== Education ==
- Fairfield Primary School
- St Anthony's Primary School
- Melbourne Polytechnic has a campus on the site of the former Fairfield Infectious Diseases Hospital, specialising in visual arts, music, horticulture, and jewellery manufacture.

== Sporting clubs ==
- Fairfield Bowling Club plays lawn bowls at Gillies St.
- Fairfield Cricket Club
- Soccer teams Fitzroy City and Yarra Jets play home matches at Fairfield Park.
- Golfers play at the course of the Yarra Bend Golf Club on Yarra Bend Road.
- Fairfield is home to the Darebin International Sports Centre, which played host to events during the 2006 Commonwealth Games.

== Transport ==
=== Bus ===
Six bus routes service Fairfield:

- 250 : Melbourne CBD (Queen Street) – La Trobe University (Bundoora Campus). Operated by Kinetic Melbourne.
- 508 : Alphington station – Moonee Ponds Junction via Northcote and Brunswick. Operated by Dysons.
- 510 : Essendon station – Ivanhoe station via Brunswick West, Moreland station, Thornbury and Fairfield. Operated by Kinetic Melbourne.
- 546 : Heidelberg station – Queen Victoria Market via Clifton Hill, Carlton and the University of Melbourne. Operated by Dysons.
- 567 : Northcote – Regent station via Northland Shopping Centre. Operated by Dysons.
- 609 : Hawthorn station – Fairfield via Kew. Operated by Dysons.

=== Train ===
Fairfield is serviced by Fairfield station, which is on the Hurstbridge line.

== Gallery ==
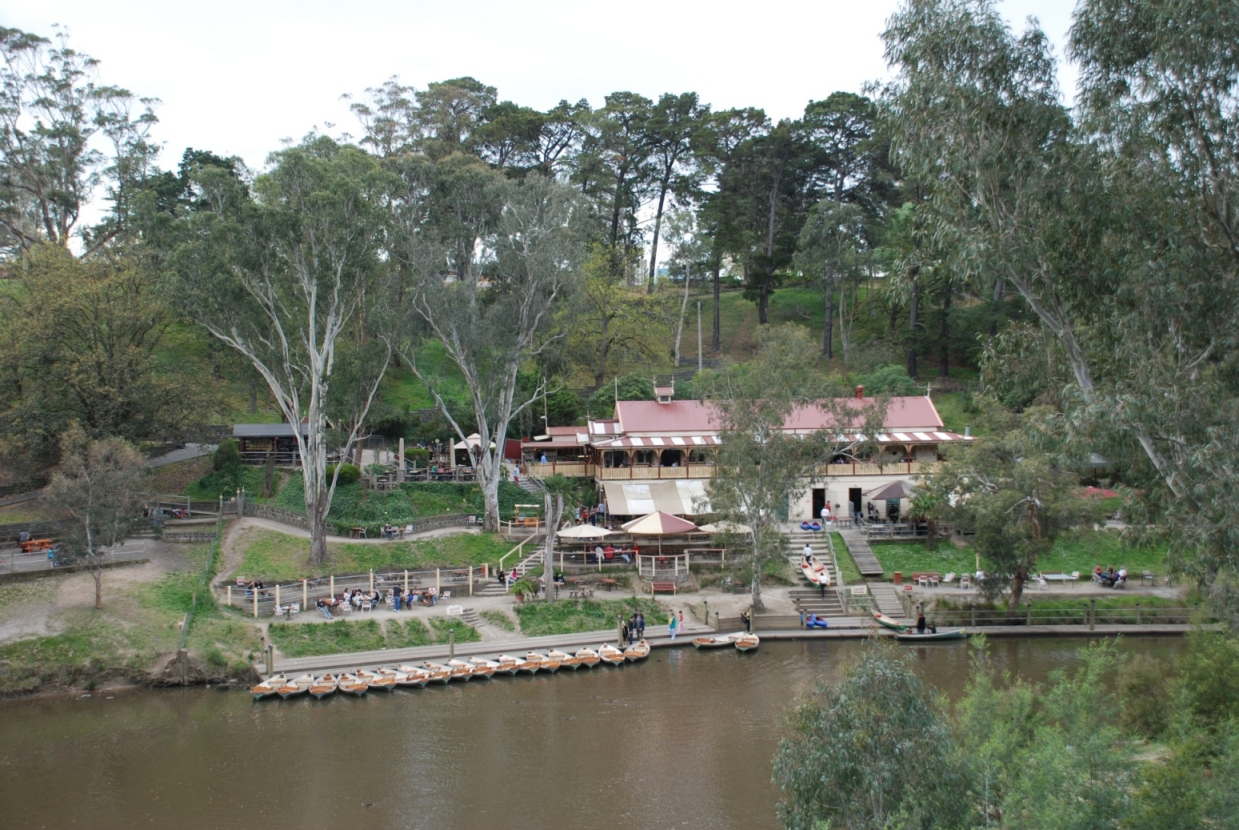
Fairfield Boathouse

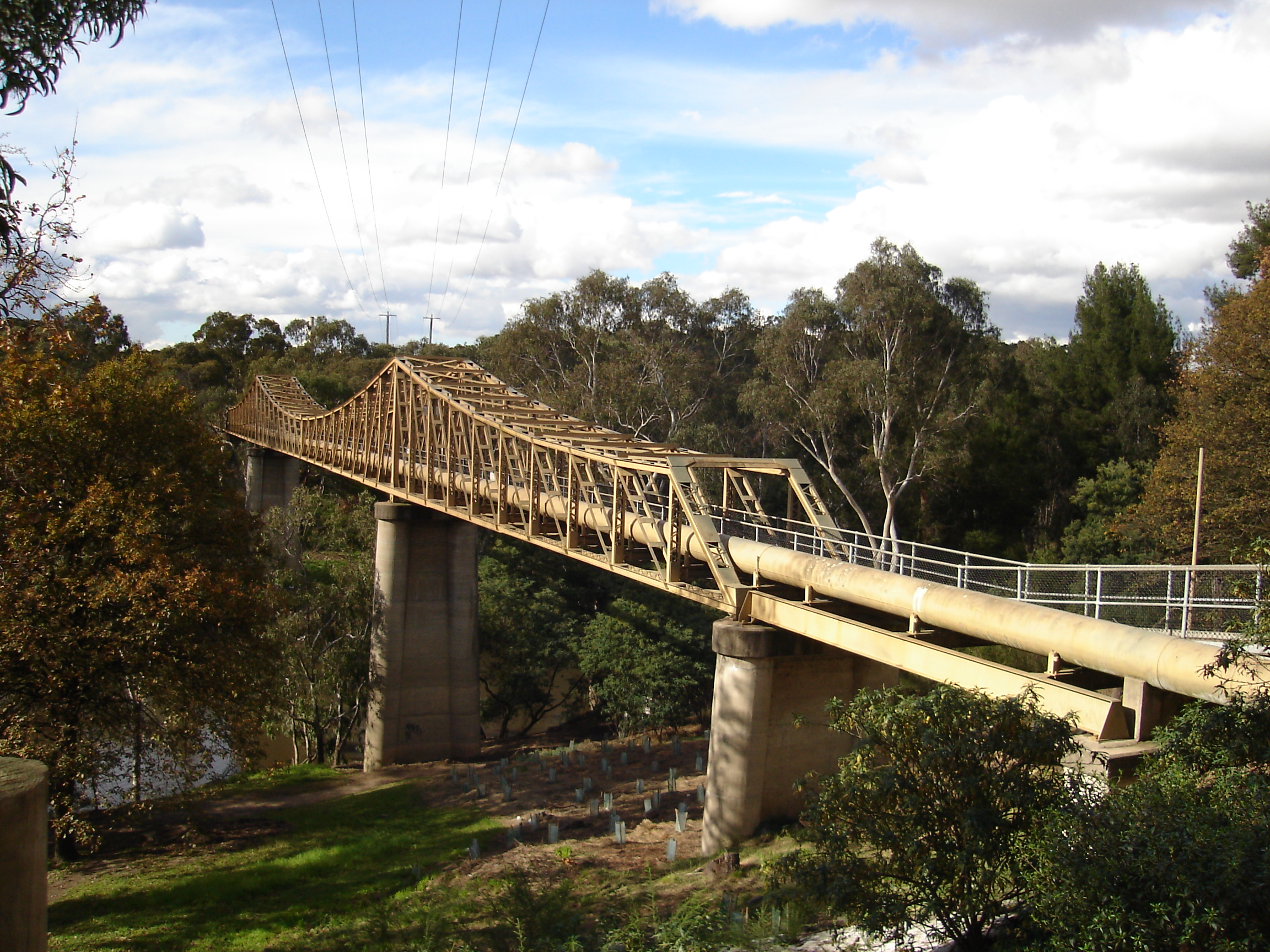
Fairfield Pipe Bridge in Yarra Park

Fairfield Industrial Dog Object, Station Street, Fairfield

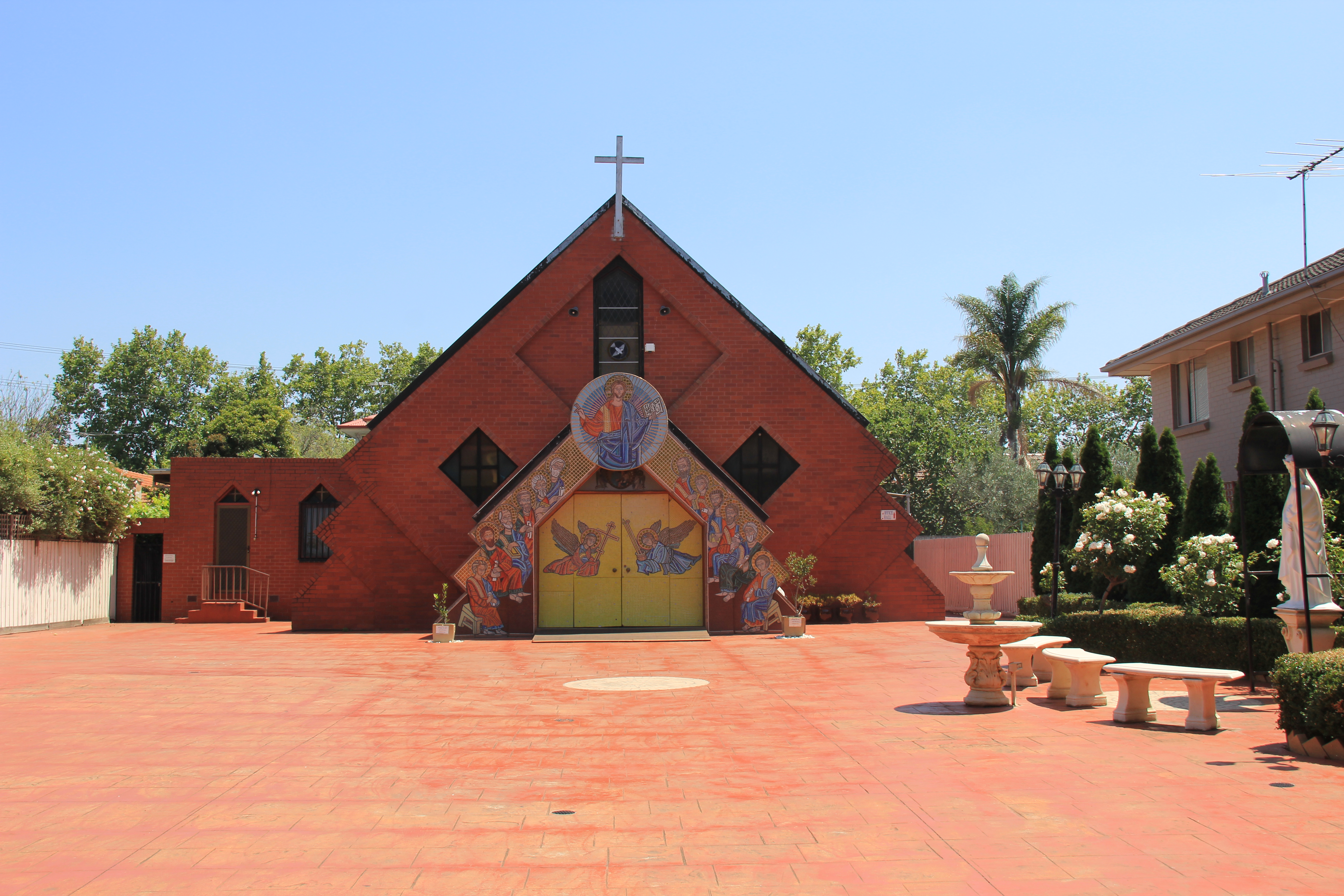
St Joseph's Melkite Catholic Church, Fairfield

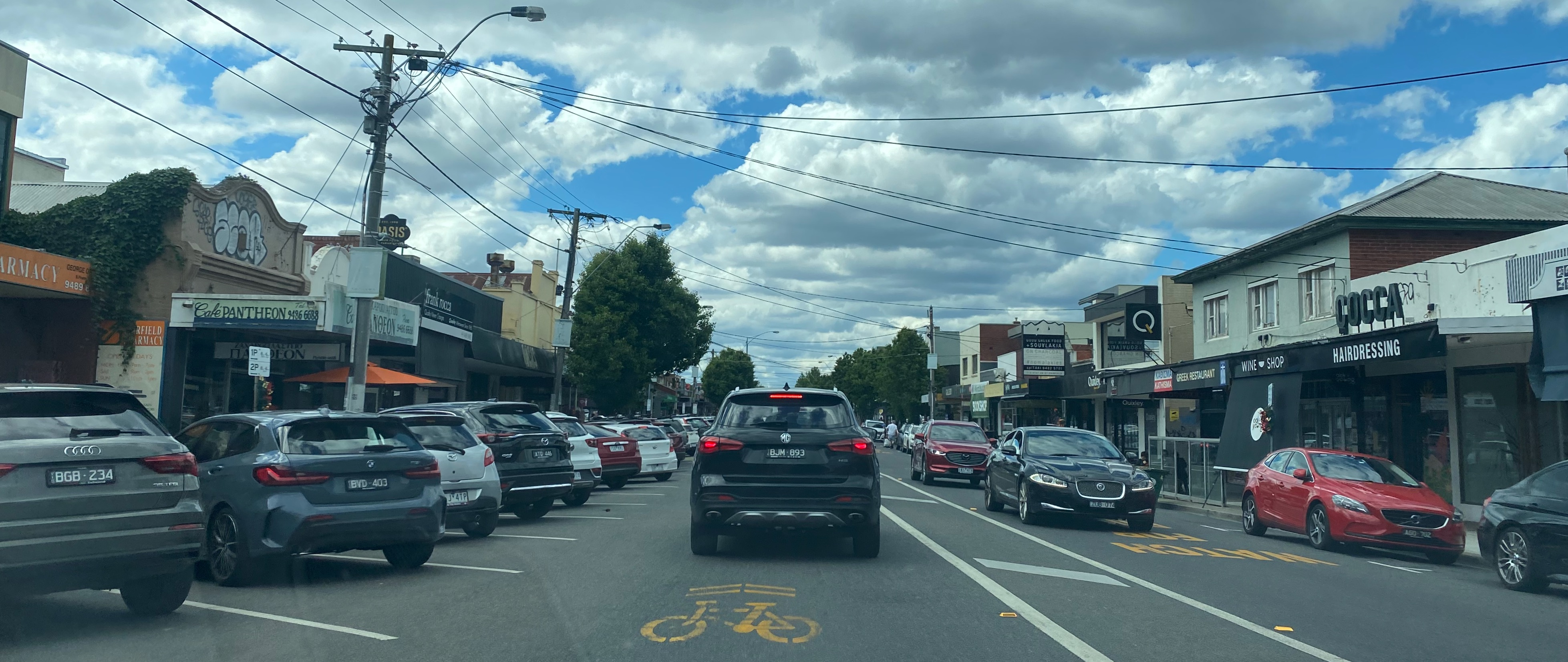
Station St is the main shopping hub in Fairfield

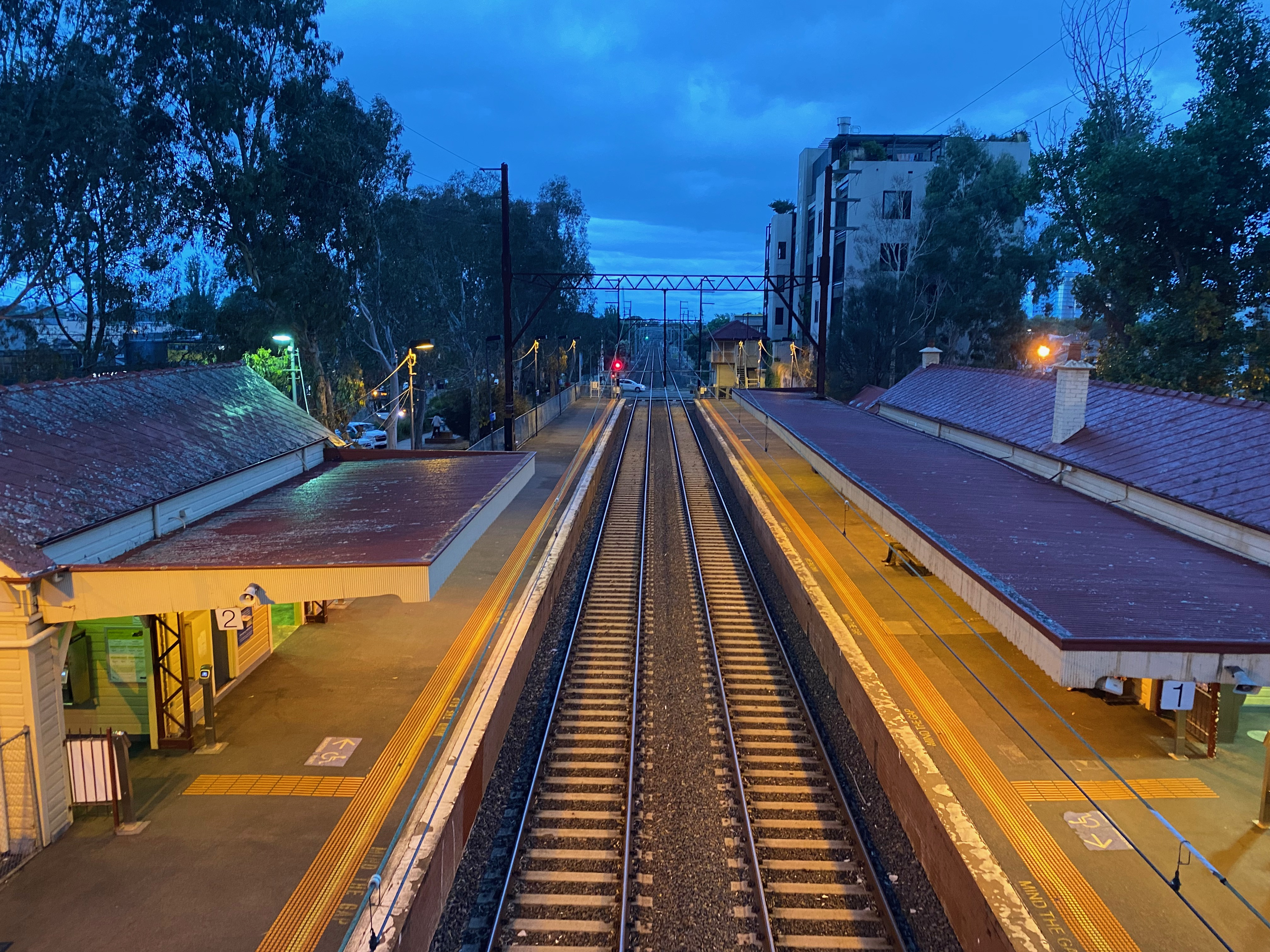
Fairfield railway station as viewed from the pedestrian overpass at dusk

== See also ==
- City of Northcote – Fairfield was previously within this former local government area.
