= Pam the Bird =

Australian graffiti tag

Pam the Bird MP
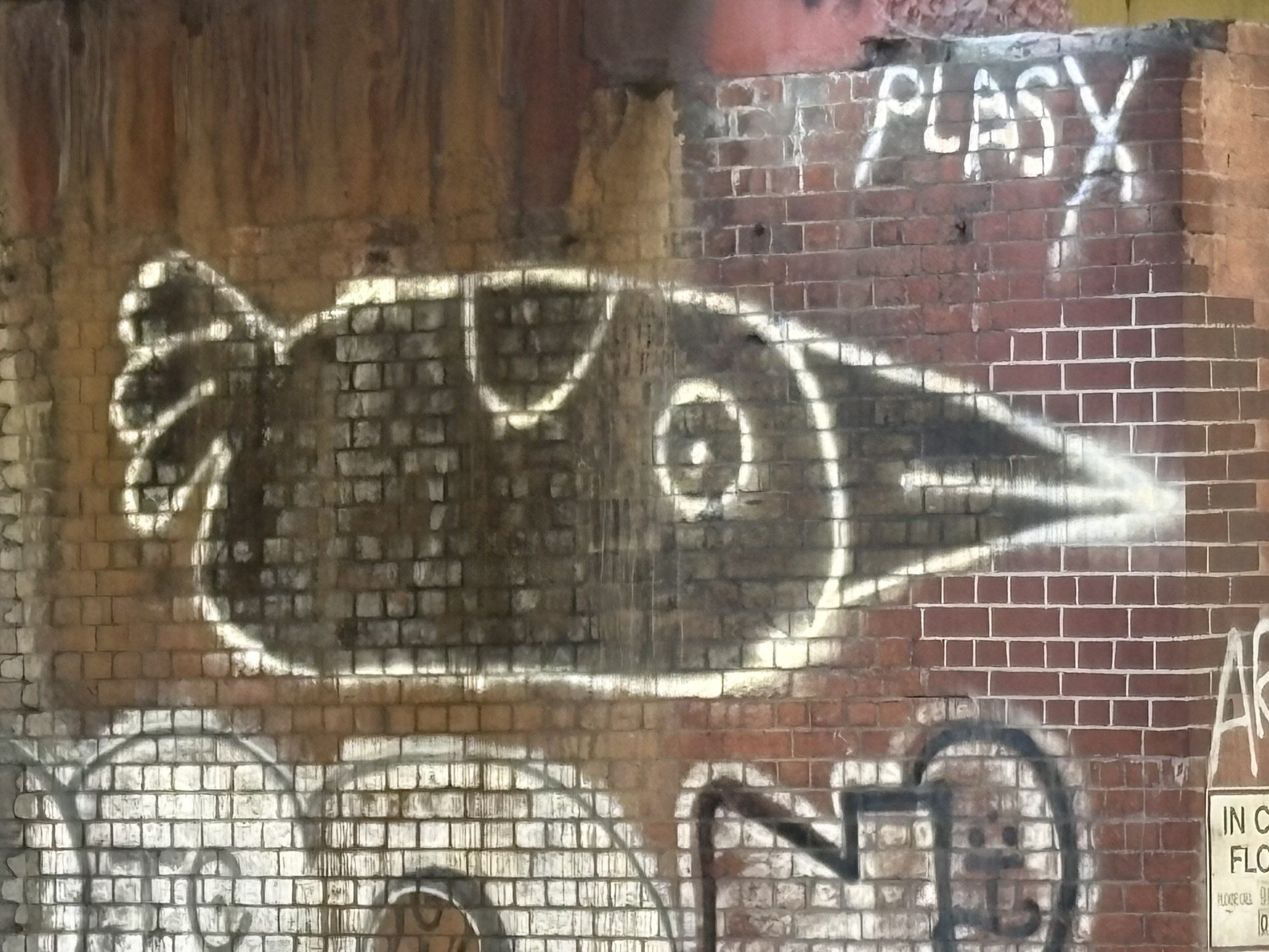
- Pam the Bird graffiti in West Melbourne, March 2025
- Movement: Street art

Pam the Bird is a graffiti tag that has appeared widely throughout Melbourne since at least 2023. A cartoon bird, Pam the Bird has gained widespread fame for its abundance and high-profile locations, from buildings and freeway signs to heritage-listed sites such as Flinders Street railway station and the Clifton Hill Shot Tower. After a police investigation that began in January 2024, the tag's alleged creator and an accomplice were arrested in January 2025. A court case is ongoing.

== Early use ==
In September 2022, an 18-year-old was arrested on the Gold Coast, Queensland, after they spray painted a rail worker in the face at Park Road railway station. The worker had caught the teenager spray painting a large bird at Park Road railway station. The culprit was charged with 24 offences and placed on two-year probation. Journalists later described the teenager's alleged work as "Pam the Bird".

== Rise to prominence ==
Reports of Pam the Bird in Melbourne date back to at least 2023. (Note: In 2025, a Nine News report said it had appeared since 2021 without further clarification.) That year, the graffiti tag became well-known as a common sight not just along train lines and tram routes, but also on the trains themselves. It also appeared in other prominent locations, such as on the back of road signs along the West Gate Freeway. The Herald Sun reported that social media pages had emerged following Pam the Bird. Some videos depicted graffiti vandals performing dangerous stunts to spray paint the bird, including by hanging off a bridge. The Instagram account @goodbirdart, which was created in 2024 and ostensibly run by a third party, regularly posted behind-the-scenes Pam the Bird content, having amassed over 80,000 followers by the time of its deletion in mid-2025.

In the later months of 2024, Pam the Bird's range expanded out of Melbourne's west. It received media attention following an incident on 10 July 2024 in which a clock tower at Flinders Street railway station near Elizabeth Street was spray painted with graffiti. Several other high-profile graffiti incidents attributed to Pam the Bird attracted news attention, including on the Novotel hotel in the inner Melbourne suburb of South Wharf on 20 January 2025, the Cheese Stick sculpture over the CityLink tollway, the offices of the Nine Network in Docklands, the Uncle Tobys silo in West Footscray, the Clifton Hill Shot Tower, Comeng and HCMT train carriages operated on the Melbourne suburban rail network. Police stated that Pam the Bird made heavy use of abseiling to conduct graffiti activities.

In the early morning of 7 July 2026, Pam the Bird climbed up the eastern tower of the Bolte Bridge, abseiled down and graffitied a giant character atop it. They then posted footage from the top of the tower on Instagram under the handle "@pambirdofficial". This included a demands to "lower taxes", a "peanut butter and jam sandwich", a "glass of milk" and a "blanket" before they would come down; they requested that these items would be delivered by a drone. There is also footage of Pam the Bird abseiling partway down the 140-metre tower just to taunt police officers at the bottom before returning to the top. They refused to come down for nearly nine hours before surrendering to police peacefully.

== Description of tag ==
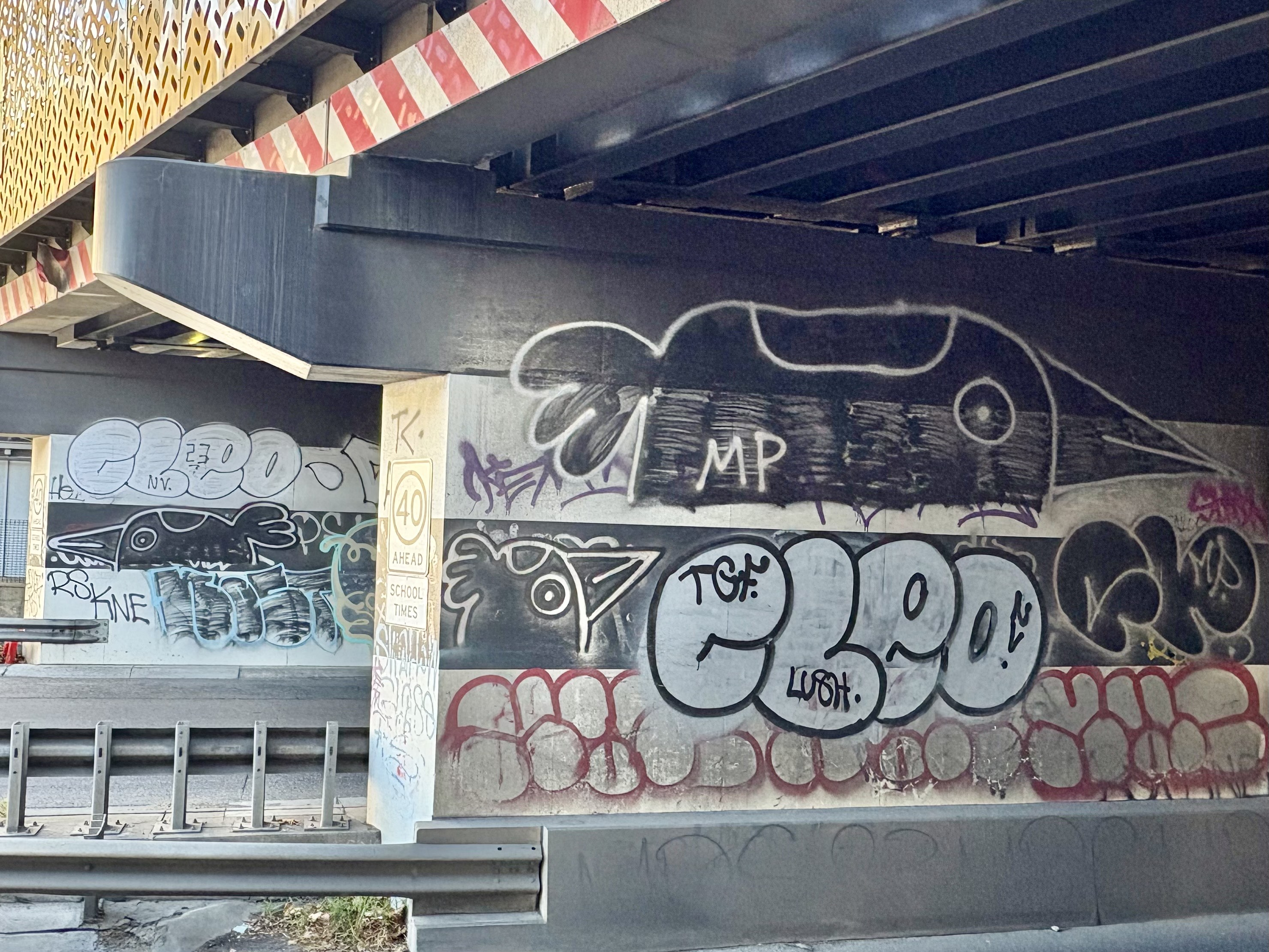
Three variations of Pam the Bird under a bridge in West Melbourne

Pam the Bird is a graffiti tag consisting of a side view of a cartoon bird. In court, Victoria Police Senior Constable Scott Nicholls said, "We typically see this bird graffiti has a sharp triangle pointed beak with a line that separates the upper and lower portion of the beak that approximately extends three quarters away from the tip". Pam the Bird varies widely: it may be coloured, embellished, or a simple outline. It is often accompanied by text, including "MP.", which The Age described as the name of a graffiti crew, and 'Srock', a similarly prolific name tag.

== Possible identity and criminal cases ==
In January 2024, Victoria Police began an investigation into Pam the Bird, led by Senior Constable Scott Nicholls. The year-long investigation found evidence that people had been making suspicious visits to the arrested individual's home over a period of months. CCTV footage of the Novotel break-in added to police suspicions regarding them as the sole graffiti tagger.

The arrestee was charged with 50 offences, including criminal damage and shop theft, and a subsequent charge of intentionally causing injury was added following allegations of stabbing a man using a kitchen knife in 2024. Police also sought government assistance with organising a Federal Bureau of Investigation search warrant of Instagram with the goal of identifying them as the owner of @goodbirdart.

On 25 February 2025, the alleged creator of Pam the Bird attended Melbourne Magistrates' Court with the goal of being released on bail, having previously been on bail in 2023. Their bail application was approved on 27 February 2025, with conditions including a requirement to live with their grandmother in East Geelong, abiding by a night-time curfew, not being in possession of equipment related to graffiti or abseiling, and an A$30,000 surety paid by a friend.

== Public reception ==
The Lord Mayor of the City of Melbourne, Nicholas Reece, has condemned Gibson-Burrell, remarking he "ain't no Banksy" and sending a warning to all potential taggers that they will be held responsible for their work.

The @goodbirdart Instagram account had more than 79,000 followers as of January 2025. The account's popularity was noted in media coverage following enforcement action by the Melbourne City Council, police and the courts.
