= Bolte Bridge =

Bridge in Melbourne, Victoria, Australia

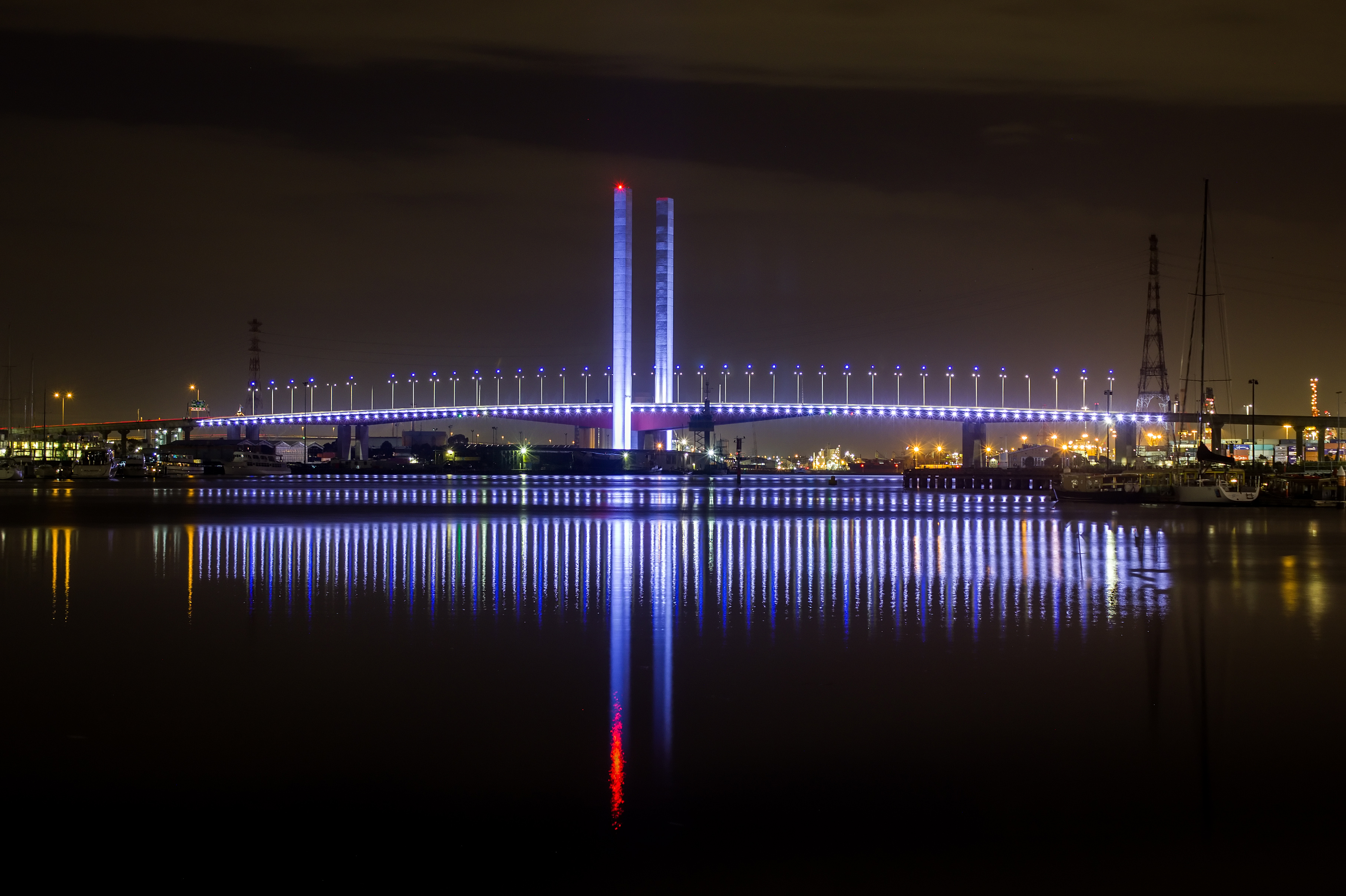
- The bridge in 2007, from Docklands
- Coordinates: 37°49′10″S 144°55′56″E
- Carries: Melbourne CityLink (Western); (vehicles only); (pedestrians and cyclists prohibited)
- Crosses: Yarra River and Victoria Harbour
- Locale: Melbourne, Victoria, Australia
- Begins: Port Melbourne (south)
- Ends: Docklands (north)
- Other name: Yarra River Bridge
- Named for: Sir Henry Bolte
- Maintained by: Transurban
- Preceded by: Webb Bridge
- Followed by: West Gate Bridge

Characteristics
- Design: Cantilever box girder bridge
- Material: Prestressed concrete
- Total length: 490 m (1,610 ft)
- Width: 15.35 m (50.4 ft)
- Longest span: 173 m (568 ft)
- No. of spans: 4
- Clearance below: c.25 m (82 ft)
- No. of lanes: 8 lanes; (4 inbound, 4 outbound)

History
- Architect: Denton Corker Marshall
- Designer: Hyder/MBK
- Constructed by: Baulderstone Hornibrook
- Built: 1996–1999
- Opened: 16 August 1999; 26 years ago

Statistics
- Daily traffic: c. 50,000
- Toll: A$4.17 (one way, as of June 2026)

Location
- Interactive map of Bolte Bridge

The Bolte Bridge is a twin cantilever road bridge across the Yarra River and Victoria Harbour, located in Melbourne, Victoria, Australia. The bridge carries the Melbourne CityLink (Western Link) via eight lanes of traffic – four lanes northbound and four lanes southbound.

While officially only 490 metres (1,610 ft) long, the actual structure appears much longer as it forms part of a five-kilometre (3.1 mi) elevated roadway between Flemington Road and the West Gate Freeway. In the south, approaches to the bridge start in the Port Melbourne precinct and cross the river to terminate north of the Docklands precinct, to the west of the Melbourne city centre.

The bridge and adjoining roadway forms part of the CityLink system of toll roads that connects the Tullamarine Freeway from the northern suburbs with the West Gate Freeway and the Domain and Burnley tunnels to the Monash Freeway and the south eastern suburbs.

Completed in 1999, the bridge was named in honour of Sir Henry Bolte, Victoria's longest-serving Premier.

== Construction ==
The bridge was designed by architects Denton Corker Marshall and was built by Baulderstone Hornibrook, construction taking three years from 1996 to 1999. It was named by Premier of Victoria Jeff Kennett after Henry Bolte because of its linking the West Gate, Monash and Tullamarine freeways, projects commissioned or completed by the Bolte government.

It is the largest balanced-cantilever cast-in-situ box girder bridge in Australia. The superstructure was built as two independent bridges of variable depth, prestressed concrete box girders, separated by a 1.15-metre (4 ft) clear gap between the structures.

The bridge features two 140-metre-high (460 ft) grey concrete towers, situated on either side of the roadway at the midpoint of the bridge's span. These two towers are an aesthetic addition by the architects, and are not joined to the main body of the bridge. The towers are hollow and include access ladders to a small roof top hatch. Until they were locked and surrounded by water, these towers were a popular target for urban explorers. The bridge was awarded the Royal Australian Institute of Architects (RAIA) National Special Jury Award for the Most Outstanding Works of Architecture in 1999, as well as a RAIA Victorian Chapter Commendation for Urban Design in the same year.

The bridge has two main spans of 173 metres (568 ft), two side spans of 72 metres (236 ft) with approach viaducts 430 metres (1,410 ft) to the south 4,080 metres (13,390 ft) to the north. It supports eight road lanes. Access is prohibited to cyclists and pedestrians.

Other bridges in Australia of similar construction are the Gateway Bridge, Brisbane and Mooney Mooney Bridge near Gosford.

== Popular culture ==
A fun run, to raise funds for the Royal Children's Hospital Melbourne, is held across the bridge around Easter annually. The fun run has earned the moniker, "The Bolte Bolt".

== See also ==
- Crossings of the Yarra River
- West Gate Tunnel

Next crossing upstream	Yarra River	Next crossing downstream
Webb Bridge (pedestrians; cyclists)	Bolte Bridge	West Gate Bridge (vehicles; pedestrians; cyclists)
