= List of acts of the Parliament of Victoria from 1998 =

This is a list of acts of the Parliament of Victoria, Australia for the year 1998.

== 1998 ==
Short title, or popular name	Citation	Royal assent
Long title
Financial Management (Amendment) Act 1998 (repealed)	No. 1 of 1998	31 March 1998
An Act to amend the Financial Management Act 1994 (Note: Financial Management Act 1994 (No. 18 of 1994)) with respect to accrual output budgeting and for other purposes. (Repealed by Statute Law (Further Revision) Act 2002 (No. 11 of 2002))
Public Prosecutions (Amendment) Act 1998 (repealed)	No. 2 of 1998	31 March 1998
(Repealed by Statute Law (Further Revision) Act 2002 (No. 11 of 2002))
Tertiary Education (Amendment) Act 1998 (repealed)	No. 3 of 1998	31 March 1998
(Repealed by Statute Law (Further Revision) Act 2002 (No. 11 of 2002))
Trans-Tasman Mutual Recognition (Victoria) Act 1998	No. 4 of 1998	31 March 1998
An Act to adopt the Trans-Tasman Mutual Recognition Act 1997 (Note: Trans-Tasman Mutual Recognition Act 1997 (No. 190 (Cth))) of the Commonwealth and for other purposes.
Arts Acts (Statute Law Revision) Act 1998 (repealed)	No. 5 of 1998	
(Repealed by Statute Law (Further Revision) Act 2002 (No. 11 of 2002))
Education (Teachers) Act 1998 (repealed)	No. 6 of 1998	
(Repealed by Statute Law (Further Revision) Act 2002 (No. 11 of 2002))
Geographic Place Names Act 1998	No. 7 of 1998	21 April 1998
An Act to make provision for the naming of places and the registration of place names, to amend the Survey Co-ordination Act 1958 (Note: Survey Co-ordination Act 1958 (No. 6388)) and the Local Government Act 1989 (Note: Local Government Act 1989 (No. 11 of 1989)) and for other purposes.
Summary Offences (Amendment) Act 1998 (repealed)	No. 8 of 1998	
(Repealed by Statute Law (Further Revision) Act 2002 (No. 11 of 2002))
Drugs, Poisons and Controlled Substances (Amendment) Act 1998 (repealed)	No. 9 of 1998	
(Repealed by Statute Law (Further Revision) Act 2002 (No. 11 of 2002))
Electricity Industry (Amendment) Act 1998	No. 10 of 1998	28 April 1998
An Act to amend the Electricity Industry Act 1993 (Note: Electricity Industry Act 1993 (No. 130 of 1993)) and the Electricity Industry (Miscellaneous Amendment) Act 1997 (Note: Electricity Industry (Miscellaneous Amendment) Act 1997 (No. 35 of 1997)) and certain other Acts and for other purposes.
Fire and Emergency Services Acts (Amendment) Act 1998 (repealed)	No. 11 of 1998	28 April 1998
(Repealed by Statute Law (Further Revision) Act 2002 (No. 11 of 2002))
Health Acts (Statute Law Revision) Act 1998 (repealed)	No. 12 of 1998	28 April 1998
(Repealed by Statute Law (Further Revision) Act 2002 (No. 11 of 2002))
Health Services (Amendment) Act 1998 (repealed)	No. 13 of 1998	28 April 1998
(Repealed by Statute Law (Further Revision) Act 2002 (No. 11 of 2002))
Retail Tenancies Reform Act 1998	No. 14 of 1998	28 April 1998
An Act to reform the law relating to retail tenancies, to repeal the Retail Tenancies Act 1986 (Note: Retail Tenancies Act 1986 (No. 106 of 1986)) and for other purposes.
State Trustees (Amendment) Act 1998 (repealed)	No. 15 of 1998	
(Repealed by Statute Law (Further Revision) Act 2002 (No. 11 of 2002))
Transport Acts (Amendment) Act 1998 (repealed)	No. 16 of 1998	
(Repealed by Statute Law (Further Revision) Act 2002 (No. 11 of 2002))
Valuation of Land (Amendment) Act 1998 (repealed)	No. 17 of 1998	
(Repealed by Statute Law (Further Revision) Act 2002 (No. 11 of 2002))
Building (Amendment) Act 1998 (repealed)	No. 18 of 1998	
(Repealed by Statute Law (Further Revision) Act 2002 (No. 11 of 2002))
Credit (Amendment) Act 1998	No. 19 of 1998	5 May 1998
An Act to amend the Credit Act 1984 (Note: Credit Act 1984 (No. 10097)) and the Credit (Administration) Act 1984 (Note: Credit (Administration) Act 1984 (No. 10091)) and for other purposes.
Crimes (Family Violence) (Amendment) Act 1998 (repealed)	No. 20 of 1998	5 May 1998
(Repealed by Statute Law (Further Revision) Act 2002 (No. 11 of 2002))
Evidence (Confidential Communications) Act 1998	No. 21 of 1998	5 May 1998
An Act to amend the Evidence Act 1958 (Note: Evidence Act 1958 (No. 6246)) so as to protect from disclosure in legal proceedings confidential communications between the victim or alleged victim of a sexual offence and a medical practitioner or counsellor and for other purposes.
Firearms (Amendment) Act 1998 (repealed)	No. 22 of 1998	5 May 1998
(Repealed by Statute Law (Further Revision) Act 2002 (No. 11 of 2002))
Property Law (Amendment) Act 1998 (repealed)	No. 23 of 1998	5 May 1998
(Repealed by Statute Law (Further Revision) Act 2002 (No. 11 of 2002))
Sea-Carriage Documents Act 1998	No. 24 of 1998	5 May 1998
An Act to reform the law relating to bills of lading, sea waybills and ship's delivery orders, to amend the Goods Act 1958 (Note: Goods Act 1958 (No. 6265)) and for other purposes.
Electricity Safety Act 1998	No. 25 of 1998	12 May 1998
An Act relating to the safety of electricity supply and use and the efficiency of electrical equipment, to repeal the Electric Light and Power Act 1958, (Note: Electric Light and Power Act 1958 (No. 6241)) to amend certain other Acts and for other purposes.
Agriculture Acts (Amendment) Act 1998 (repealed)	No. 26 of 1998	
(Repealed by Statute Law (Further Revision) Act 2002 (No. 11 of 2002))
Dried Fruits (Repeal) Act 1998 (repealed)	No. 27 of 1998	19 May 1998
An Act to repeal the Dried Fruits Act 1958, (Note: Dried Fruits Act 1958 (No. 6239)) to transfer the property, assets, rights and liabilities of the Victorian Dried Fruits Board to a trust established for the purpose of promoting the development of the dried fruits industry and for other purposes. (Repealed by Legislation Reform (Repeals No. 2) Act 2008 (No. 16 of 2008))
Education (Self-Governing Schools) Act 1998	No. 28 of 1998	19 May 1998
An Act to amend the Education Act 1958 (Note: Education Act 1958 (No. 6240)) and the Teaching Service Act 1981 (Note: Education Service Act 1981 (No. 9714)) to make further provision for the management and operation of State schools and for other purposes.
Gaming Acts (Amendment) Act 1998 (repealed)	No. 29 of 1998	19 May 1998
(Repealed by Statute Law (Further Revision) Act 2002 (No. 11 of 2002))
Gaming No. 2 (Amendment) Act 1998 (repealed)	No. 30 of 1998	19 May 1998
(Repealed by Statute Law (Further Revision) Act 2002 (No. 11 of 2002))
Gas Pipelines Access (Victoria) Act 1998	No. 31 of 1998	19 May 1998
An Act to make provision for the regulation of third party access to natural gas pipeline systems, to amend the Gas Industry Act 1994 (Note: Gas Industry Act 1994 (No. 112 of 1994)) and for other purposes.
Heritage Rivers (Amendment) Act 1998 (repealed)	No. 32 of 1998	19 May 1998
(Repealed by Statute Law (Further Revision) Act 2002 (No. 11 of 2002))
Local Government (Darebin City Council) Act 1998 (repealed)	No. 33 of 1998	19 May 1998
An Act to dismiss the Darebin City Council and set a date for a general election for that Council and for other purposes. (Repealed by Legislation Reform (Repeals No. 1) Act 2008 (No. 10 of 2008))
Transport Accident (Amendment) Act 1998 (repealed)	No. 34 of 1998	
(Repealed by Statute Law (Further Revision) Act 2002 (No. 11 of 2002))
Victorian Plantations Corporation (Amendment) Act 1998 (repealed)	No. 35 of 1998	
(Repealed by Statute Law (Further Revision) Act 2002 (No. 11 of 2002))
Appropriation (1998/99) Act 1998	No. 36 of 1998	20 May 1998
An Act for the appropriation of certain sums out of the Consolidated Fund in respect of the financial year 1998/99 and for other purposes.
Appropriation (Parliament 1998/99) Act 1998	No. 37 of 1998	20 May 1998
An Act for the appropriation of certain sums out of the Consolidated Fund for the Parliament in respect of the financial year 1998/99 and for other purposes.
Ambulance Services (Amendment) Act 1998 (repealed)	No. 38 of 1998	
(Repealed by Statute Law (Further Revision) Act 2002 (No. 11 of 2002))
Catchment and Land Protection (Amendment) Act 1998	No. 39 of 1998	26 May 1998
An Act to amend the Catchment and Land Protection Act 1994 (Note: Catchment and Land Protection Act 1994 (No. 52 of 1994)) and the Water Act 1989 (Note: Water Act 1989 (No. 80 of 1989)) and for other purposes.
Gas Industry (Amendment) Act 1998 (repealed)	No. 40 of 1998	
(Repealed by Statute Law (Further Revision) Act 2002 (No. 11 of 2002))
Land Tax (Amendment) Act 1998 (repealed)	No. 41 of 1998	
(Repealed by Statute Law (Further Revision) Act 2002 (No. 11 of 2002))
Melbourne and Olympic Parks (Amendment) Act 1998 (repealed)	No. 42 of 1998	
(Repealed by Statute Law (Further Revision) Act 2002 (No. 11 of 2002))
Miscellaneous Acts (Omnibus No. 1) Act 1998 (repealed)	No. 43 of 1998	
(Repealed by Statute Law (Further Revision) Act 2002 (No. 11 of 2002))
Parks Victoria Act 1998	No. 44 of 1998	26 May 1998
An Act to establish Parks Victoria, to amend the Water Industry Act 1994 (Note: Water Industry Act 1994 (No. 121 of 1994)) and certain Acts and for other purposes.
Public Sector Management and Employment Act 1998	No. 45 of 1998	26 May 1998
An Act to provide for the management of the Victorian public sector and for other purposes.
Public Sector Reform (Miscellaneous Amendments) Act 1998	No. 46 of 1998	26 May 1998
An Act to amend the Administrative Arrangements Act 1983, (Note: Administrative Arrangements Act 1983 (No. 9916)) to repeal the Public Authorities (Equal Employment Opportunity) Act 1990 (Note: Public Authorities (Equal Employment Opportunity) Act 1990 (No. 79 of 1990)) and the Public Sector Management Act 1992 (Note: Public Sector Management Act 1992 (No. 68 of 1992)) and to provide for consequential and transitional matters arising from the repeal of the Public Sector Management Act 1992 and the enactment of the Public Sector Management and Employment Act 1998 (Note: Public Sector Management and Employment Act 1998 (No. 45 of 1998)) and for other purposes.
Rail Corporations (Amendment) Act 1998 (repealed)	No. 47 of 1998	
(Repealed by Statute Law (Further Revision) Act 2002 (No. 11 of 2002))
State Taxation (Amendment) Act 1998 (repealed)	No. 48 of 1998	
(Repealed by Statute Law (Further Revision) Act 2002 (No. 11 of 2002))
Business Licensing Authority Act 1998	No. 49 of 1998	2 June 1998
An Act to establish the Business Licensing Authority and for other purposes.
Melbourne City Link (Exhibition Street Extension) Act 1998	No. 50 of 1998	2 June 1998
An Act to amend the Melbourne City Link Act 1995, (Note: Melbourne City Link Act 1995 (No. 107 of 1995)) to provide for the ratification of agreements with respect to the Melbourne City Link Project and the Exhibition Street Extension Project and to make further provision for the operation of the Exhibition Street Extension Project road, to amend the Melbourne City Link Authority Act 1994 (Note: Melbourne City Link Authority Act 1994 (No. 116 of 1994)) to make further provision with respect to the powers and functions of the Melbourne City Link Authority, to make related amendments to other Acts and for other purposes.
St George Bank and Advance Bank Australia Act 1998	No. 51 of 1998	2 June 1998
An Act to facilitate the merger of Advance Bank Australia Limited with the St. George Bank Limited and for other purposes.
Tribunals and Licensing Authorities (Miscellaneous Amendments) Act 1998	No. 52 of 1998	2 June 1998
An Act to amend various Acts as a consequence of the Victorian Civil and Administrative Tribunal Act 1998 (Note: Victorian Civil and Administrative Tribunal Act 1998 (No. 53 of 1998)) and the Business Licensing Authority Act 1998, (Note: Business Licensing Authority Act 1998 (No. 49 of 1998)) to repeal the Administrative Appeals Tribunal Act 1984, (Note: Administrative Appeals Tribunal Act 1984 (No. 10155)) the Planning Appeals Act 1980 (Note: Planning Appeals Board Act 1980 (No. 9512)) and certain other Acts and for other purposes.
Victorian Civil and Administrative Tribunal Act 1998	No. 53 of 1998	2 June 1998
An Act to establish a Victorian Civil and Administrative Tribunal and for other purposes.
Local Government (Amendment) Act 1998 (repealed)	No. 54 of 1998	
(Repealed by Statute Law (Further Revision) Act 2002 (No. 11 of 2002))
Physiotherapists Registration Act 1998	No. 55 of 1998	13 October 1998
An Act to make further provision for the registration of physiotherapists and investigations into the professional conduct and fitness to practise of registered physiotherapists, to regulate the advertising of physiotherapy services, to establish a new Physiotherapists Registration Board of Victoria and a Physiotherapists Registration Board Fund, to repeal the Physiotherapists Act 1978 (Note: Physiotherapists Act 1978 (No. 9147)) and for other purposes.
Printers and Newspapers (Repeal) Act 1998 (repealed)	No. 56 of 1998	
(Repealed by Statute Law (Further Revision) Act 2002 (No. 11 of 2002))
Road Safety (Amendment) Act 1998 (repealed)	No. 57 of 1998	
(Repealed by Statute Law (Further Revision) Act 2002 (No. 11 of 2002))
Trade Measurement (Administration) (Amendment) Act 1998 (repealed)	No. 58 of 1998	
(Repealed by Statute Law (Further Revision) Act 2002 (No. 11 of 2002))
Arts Acts (Amendment) Act 1998 (repealed)	No. 59 of 1998	
(Repealed by Statute Law (Further Revision) Act 2002 (No. 11 of 2002))
Classification (Publications, Films and Computer Games) (Enforcement) (Amendment) Act 1998 (repealed)	No. 60 of 1998	
(Repealed by Statute Law (Further Revision) Act 2002 (No. 11 of 2002))
Land (Revocation of Reservations) Act 1998	No. 61 of 1998	27 October 1998
An Act to provide for the revocation of reservations over certain areas of land, including land at Bairnsdale, and for other purposes.
Mutual Recognition (Victoria) Act 1998	No. 62 of 1998	27 October 1998
An Act to continue the adoption of the Mutual Recognition Act 1992 (Note: Mutual Recognition Act 1992 (No. 198 (Cth))) of the Commonwealth, to amend the Trans-Tasman Mutual Recognition (Victoria) Act 1998 (Note: Trans-Tasman Mutual Recognition (Victoria) Act 1998 (No. 4 of 1998)) and certain other Acts and for other purposes.
Road Safety (Driving Instructors) Act 1998 (repealed)	No. 63 of 1998	
(Repealed by Statute Law (Further Revision) Act 2002 (No. 11 of 2002))
Bail (Amendment) Act 1998 (repealed)	No. 64 of 1998	
(Repealed by Statute Law (Further Revision) Act 2002 (No. 11 of 2002))
Crimes (Amendment) Act 1998 (repealed)	No. 65 of 1998	
(Repealed by Statute Law (Further Revision) Act 2002 (No. 11 of 2002))
Health Services (Further Amendment) Act 1998 (repealed)	No. 66 of 1998	
(Repealed by Statute Law (Further Revision) Act 2002 (No. 11 of 2002))
International Transfer of Prisoners (Victoria) Act 1998	No. 67 of 1998	4 November 1998
An Act relating to the transfer of prisoners to and from Australia.
Land (Further Revocation of Reservations) Act 1998	No. 68 of 1998	4 November 1998
An Act to provide for the revocation of reservations over certain areas of land, to repeal the Bendigo (Dai Gum San Village) Land Act 1975 (Note: Bendigo (Dai Gum San Village) Land Act 1975 (No. 8762)) and for other purposes.
MacKillop Family Services Act 1998	No. 69 of 1998	4 November 1998
An Act relating to MacKillop Family Services Ltd and for other purposes.
National Parks (Amendment) Act 1998 (repealed)	No. 70 of 1998	4 November 1998
(Repealed by Statute Law (Further Revision) Act 2002 (No. 11 of 2002))
Patriotic Funds (Amendment) Act 1998 (repealed)	No. 71 of 1998	4 November 1998
(Repealed by Statute Law (Further Revision) Act 2002 (No. 11 of 2002))
Planning and Environment (Amendment) Act 1998 (repealed)	No. 72 of 1998	4 November 1998
(Repealed by Statute Law (Further Revision) Act 2002 (No. 11 of 2002))
Road Safety (Further Amendment) Act 1998 (repealed)	No. 73 of 1998	4 November 1998
(Repealed by Statute Law (Further Revision) Act 2002 (No. 11 of 2002))
Victorian Institute of Marine Sciences (Repeal) Act 1998	No. 74 of 1998	4 November 1998
An Act to repeal the Victorian Institute of Marine Sciences Act 1974 (Note: Victorian Institute of Marine Sciences Act 1974 (No. 8607)) and for other purposes.
Building (Plumbing) Act 1998	No. 75 of 1998	10 November 1998
An Act to amend the Building Act 1993 (Note: Building Act 1993 (No. 126 of 1993)) in relation to plumbing matters and for other purposes.
Conservation, Forests and Lands (Miscellaneous Amendments) Act 1998 (repealed)	No. 76 of 1998	10 November 1998
(Repealed by Statute Law (Further Revision) Act 2002 (No. 11 of 2002))
Consumer Credit (Finance Brokers) Act 1998	No. 77 of 1998	10 November 1998
An Act to repeal the Finance Brokers Act 1969, (Note: Finance Brokers Act 1969 (No. 7846)) to amend the Consumer Credit (Victoria) Act 1995 (Note: Consumer Credit (Victoria) Act 1995 (No. 41 of 1995)) so as to prohibit certain persons from engaging or being involved in finance broking, to empower the Business Licensing Authority to permit certain persons to engage in finance broking and for other purposes.
Fundraising Appeals Act 1998 or the Fundraising Act 1998	No. 78 of 1998	10 November 1998
An Act to regulate fundraising appeals, to repeal the Fundraising Appeals Act 1984 (Note: Fundraising Appeals Act 1984 (No. 10138)) and for other purposes.
Legal Practice (Amendment) Act 1998 (repealed)	No. 79 of 1998	
(Repealed by Statute Law (Further Revision) Act 2002 (No. 11 of 2002))
Crimes, Confiscation and Evidence Acts (Amendment) Act 1998 (repealed)	No. 80 of 1998	
(Repealed by Statute Law (Further Revision) Act 2002 (No. 11 of 2002))
Accident Compensation (Amendment) Act 1998 (repealed)	No. 81 of 1998	
(Repealed by Statute Law (Further Revision) Act 2002 (No. 11 of 2002))
Education (Amendment) Act 1998 (repealed)	No. 82 of 1998	
(Repealed by Statute Law (Further Revision) Act 2002 (No. 11 of 2002))
Livestock Disease Control (Amendment) Act 1998 (repealed)	No. 83 of 1998	
(Repealed by Statute Law (Further Revision) Act 2002 (No. 11 of 2002))
Superannuation Acts (Amendment) Act 1998 (repealed)	No. 84 of 1998	
(Repealed by Statute Law (Further Revision) Act 2002 (No. 11 of 2002))
Transfer of Land (Single Register) Act 1998 (repealed)	No. 85 of 1998	
(Repealed by Statute Law (Further Revision) Act 2002 (No. 11 of 2002))
Local Government (Governance and Melton) Act 1998	No. 86 of 1998	17 November 1998
An Act to amend the Docklands Authority Act 1991, (Note: Docklands Authority Act 1991 (No. 22 of 1991)) the Local Government Act 1989 and the City of Melbourne Act 1993 (Note: City of Melbourne Act 1993 (No. 98 of 1993)) and other Acts and for other purposes.
Appeal Costs Act 1998	No. 87 of 1998	24 November 1998
An Act to re-enact, with amendments, the Appeal Costs Act 1964 (Note: Appeal Costs Fund Act 1964 (No. 7117)) and for other purposes.
Chattel Securities (Amendment) Act 1998 (repealed)	No. 88 of 1998	24 November 1998
An Act to amend the Chattel Securities Act 1987 (Note: Chattel Securities Act 1987 (No. 15 of 1987)) as a consequence of the establishment of the national vehicle security enquiry register and the Victorian Civil and Administrative Tribunal and for other purposes. (Repealed by Statute Law (Further Revision) Act 2002 (No. 11 of 2002))
Electricity Industry Acts (Amendment) Act 1998 (repealed)	No. 89 of 1998	24 November 1998
(Repealed by Statute Law (Further Revision) Act 2002 (No. 11 of 2002))
Gaming Acts (Further Amendment) Act 1998 (repealed)	No. 90 of 1998	24 November 1998
(Repealed by Statute Law (Further Revision) Act 2002 (No. 11 of 2002))
Gas Industry Acts (Amendment) Act 1998 (repealed)	No. 91 of 1998	24 November 1998
An Act to amend the Gas Industry Act 1994, the Gas Pipelines Access (Victoria) Act 1998, (Note: Gas Pipelines Access (Victoria) Act 1998 (No. 31 of 1998)) the Gas Safety Act 1997 (Note: Gas Safety Act 1997 (No. 99 of 1997)) and certain other Acts and for other purposes. (Repealed by Legislation Reform (Repeals No. 3) Act 2008 (No. 53 of 2008))
Land Titles Validation (Amendment) Act 1998 (repealed)	No. 92 of 1998	24 November 1998
(Repealed by Statute Law (Further Revision) Act 2002 (No. 11 of 2002))
Legal Aid (Amendment) Act 1998 (repealed)	No. 93 of 1998	24 November 1998
(Repealed by Statute Law (Further Revision) Act 2002 (No. 11 of 2002))
Liquor Control Reform Act 1998	No. 94 of 1998	24 November 1998
An Act to reform the law relating to the supply and consumption of liquor, to repeal the Liquor Control Act 1987, (Note: Liquor Control Act 1987 (No. 97 of 1987)) to make consequential amendments to other Acts and for other purposes.
Local Government (Nillumbik Shire Council) Act 1998 (repealed)	No. 95 of 1998	24 November 1998
An Act to dismiss the Nillumbik Shire Council and set a date for a general election for that Council and for other purposes. (Repealed by Legislation Reform (Repeals No. 1) Act 2008 (No. 10 of 2008))
Petroleum Act 1998	No. 96 of 1998	24 November 1998
An Act to repeal and re-enact, with amendments, the Petroleum Act 1958 (Note: Petroleum Act 1958 (No. 6334)) and for other purposes.
Racing and Betting Acts (Amendment) Act 1998 (repealed)	No. 97 of 1998	
(Repealed by Statute Law (Further Revision) Act 2002 (No. 11 of 2002))
Rail Corporations (Further Amendment) Act 1998 (repealed)	No. 98 of 1998	
(Repealed by Statute Law (Further Revision) Act 2002 (No. 11 of 2002))
Transport (Amendment) Act 1998 (repealed)	No. 99 of 1998	
(Repealed by Statute Law (Further Revision) Act 2002 (No. 11 of 2002))
Victorian College of the Arts (Amendment) Act 1998 (repealed)	No. 100 of 1998	
(Repealed by Statute Law (Further Revision) Act 2002 (No. 11 of 2002))
Licensing and Tribunal (Amendment) Act 1998 (repealed)	No. 101 of 1998	
(Repealed by Statute Law (Further Revision) Act 2002 (No. 11 of 2002))
Melbourne City Link (Amendment) Act 1998 (repealed)	No. 102 of 1998	
(Repealed by Statute Law (Further Revision) Act 2002 (No. 11 of 2002))
State Taxation (Further Amendment) Act 1998 (repealed)	No. 103 of 1998	
(Repealed by Statute Law (Further Revision) Act 2002 (No. 11 of 2002))
Melbourne Cricket Ground (Amendment) Act 1998 (repealed)	No. 104 of 1998	1 December 1998
An Act to amend the Melbourne Cricket Ground Act 1933 (Note: Melbourne Cricket Ground Act 1933 (No. 4149)) and for other purposes. (Repealed by Statute Law (Further Revision) Act 2002 (No. 11 of 2002))

== Sources ==
- "Acts as made: 1998". Victoria Legislation.
