= Roads in Victoria =

Road network in Victoria, Australia

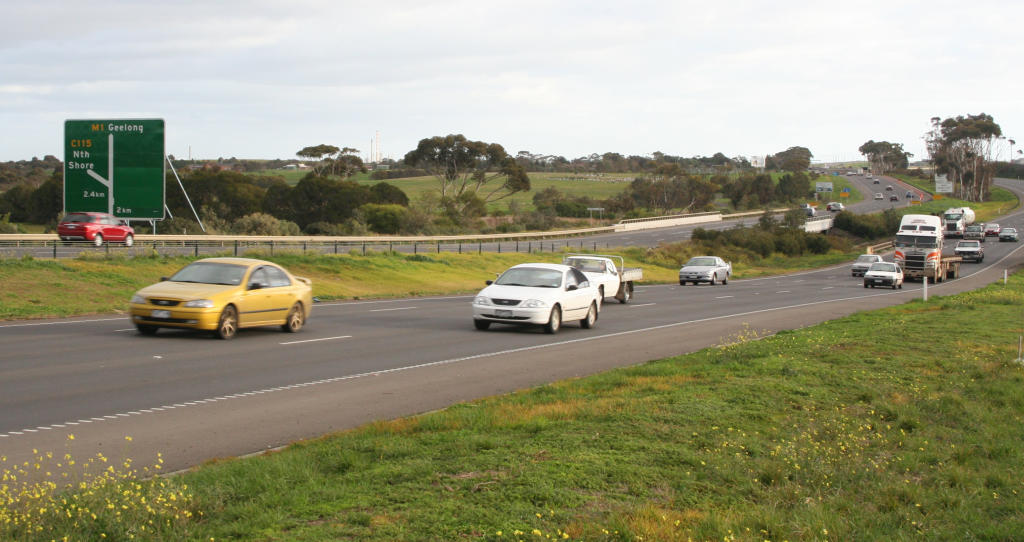
Princes Freeway at Lara

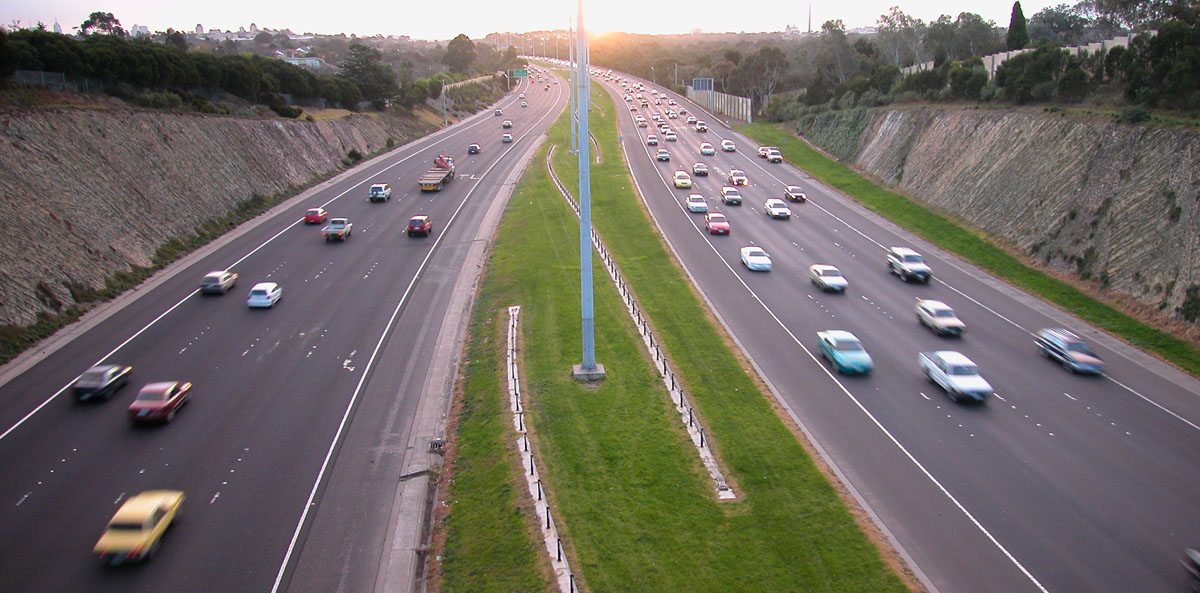
Eastern Freeway, looking towards Melbourne city

Victoria has the highest density of roads of any state in Australia. Unlike Australia's other mainland states, which have vast areas with virtually no residents, Victoria has population centres spread out over most of the state, with only the far north-west and the Victorian Alps without significant settlements. Population centres are linked by high quality highways and freeways. The state capital, Melbourne, has the most extensive freeway network of any city in Australia.

VicRoads is responsible for road planning, motor vehicle registration, and driver licensing in Victoria. The Victorian government has set up a framework for the integration of transport facilities in the State. Two private companies operate toll roads in the state.

Roads in Victoria are shared by a multitude of modes of transport, ranging from trucks to bicycles, public buses, trams, taxis as well as private cars of all types. Road safety is a primary concern of road authorities, including the police and government. Victoria was the first jurisdiction in the world to introduce compulsory seat belt legislation. Other measures introduced are drunk driving laws and speed cameras. Victorian road laws are constantly reviewed. The number of road fatalities has declined over the past decade in line with the rest of the country.

== History ==
Melbourne was founded in 1835. In 1837, Robert Hoddle laid out a road plan for the new town, which is commonly referred to as the Hoddle Grid. His plan covers the area from Flinders Street to Queen Victoria Market, and from Spencer Street to Spring Street. Since then the grid has been extended, as the town stretched out along the tram and rail lines, often with stretches of open country in between.

=== Highways ===
Victoria has the highest density of highways of any state in Australia. Unlike Australia's other mainland states, where vast areas are very sparsely inhabited, Victoria has population centres spread out over most of the state, with only the far north-west and the Victorian Alps without permanent settlement. Highways connect these population centres.

Highways generally radiate from Melbourne and other major cities and rural centres with secondary roads connecting the highways to each other. These highways provide links for state and interstate freight, personal travel and tourism, and most routes have higher traffic than most other states. Highways such as Hume Highway, Western Highway and Princes Highway have some of the heaviest traffic in Australia.

Many of the highways are built to freeway standard ("M" freeways), while most are generally sealed and of reasonable to high quality.

=== Urban freeways ===
In the 1950s and 1960s, private ownership of cars increased, and newer suburbs were created beyond the tram and rail networks. This eventually led to congestion on the road network between the suburbs and the CBD.

As Melbourne extended, planners and politicians decided that the roads could no longer cope. The 1969 Melbourne Transportation Plan called for construction of an extensive network of freeways. The Victorian government were advised by American highway planners and it sent its road engineers to the United States. The resulting network is the most extensive in Australia.

Unlike many American cities, Melbourne had an extensive public transport network and opposition to the plan grew, arguing that money is better spent on public transport upgrades, particularly to areas of Melbourne poorly served by public transport such as the outer east. This led to clashes including the showdown in 1977, over the plan to build the F19 freeway through Collingwood and Fitzroy. In the fiercest battle, groups of protesters such as the Carlton Association barricaded Alexandra Parade. Although the resulting Eastern Freeway was finally built, many road projects were shelved and freeway construction was suspended until the mid-1990s. One notable exception was the Monash Freeway, which was constructed under the John Cain Labor government. The party had a policy of no new freeways, but the road was desperately needed to link the existing Mulgrave and South-Eastern freeways. The result was a multi-lane highway with traffic lights at several major intersection. This created traffic congestion, the road being dubbed Melbourne's longest carpark. It was eventually upgraded to freeway standard, and incorporated into the Monash Freeway.

Freeway construction resumed in the 1990s, with the construction of the Western Ring Road, CityLink and others. Most of these freeways are expected eventually to join in a continuous and extensive network. Most recently, the M11 Peninsula Link was opened in 2013, to join the 2 halves of the unfinished Mornington Peninsula Freeway.

=== Impact of road transport in Melbourne ===
Where they were built, population growth followed, as Melburnians moved away from the crowded inner and middle suburbs to cheaper outer suburbs; for example, Monash Freeway and Mornington Peninsula Freeway led to explosive growth of population in the south east and the Mornington Peninsula. The completion of Western Ring Road spurred housing growth in the western suburbs.

== Safety ==
=== Notable multiple fatality incidents ===
- 23 March 2007 – Burnley Tunnel – 3 deaths, 3 injuries – 10 car pile-up, 400 evacuated
- 17 January 2010 – Mill Park, Melbourne – 5 deaths, 1 injured – 1 car split a tree in half

2010 it was announced by the State Government that trucks would be banned from the right-hand lane along a 38-kilometre section of the Princes Freeway between Geelong and Melbourne. Suggestions of a ban began in 2005 but increased after the fatal 2007 Burnley Tunnel fire that killed three people. The ban was put into place from 1 July 2010 between Kororoit Creek Road, Altona, and Avalon Road, Lara and covers all heavy vehicles weighing more than 4.5 tonnes, except buses and caravans. A fine of $358 applies to those breaking the rules, the ban being a trial before a full roll-out on the other major roads in the state.

== Names and numbering ==
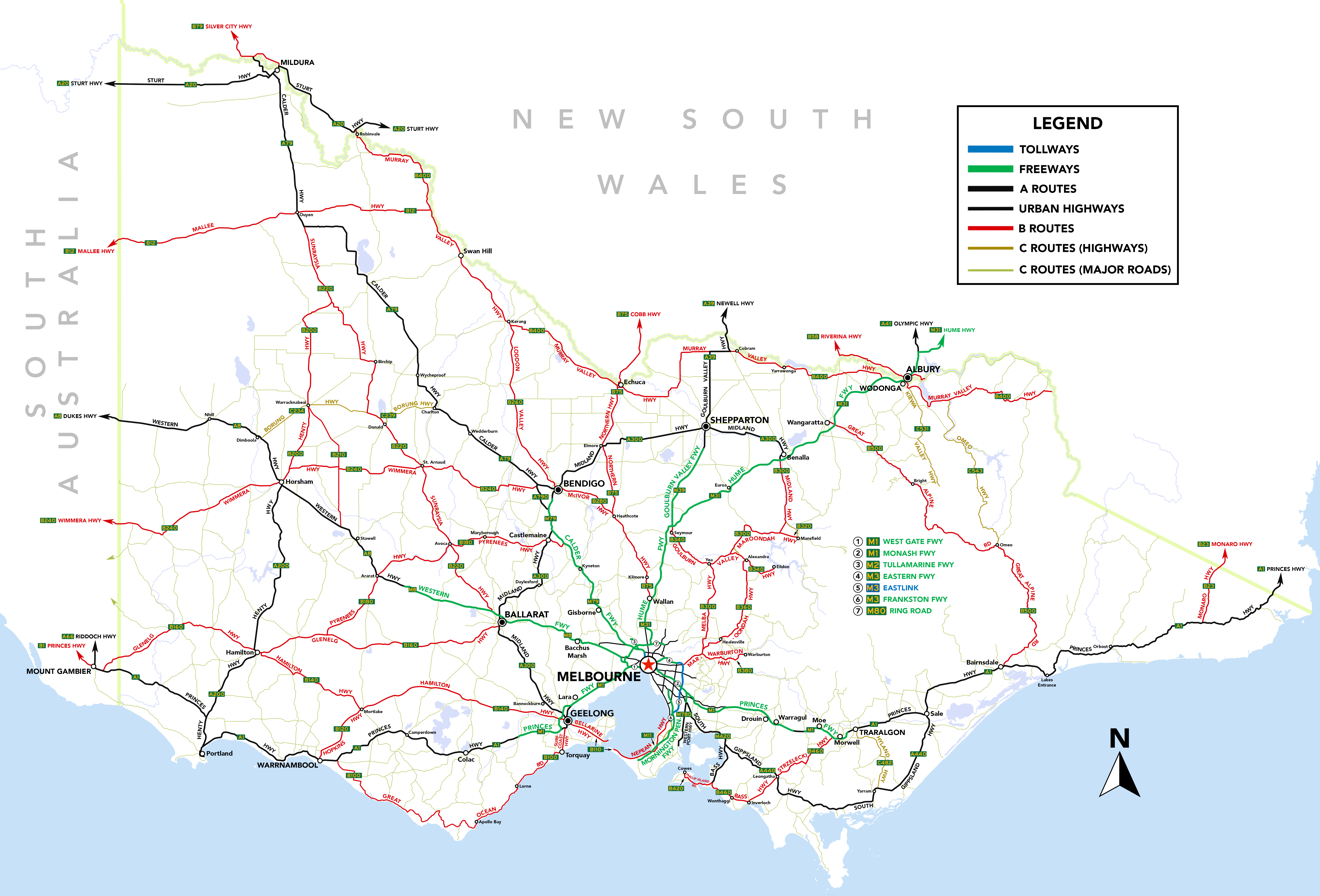
Victorian highway and road network, with significant cities and towns.

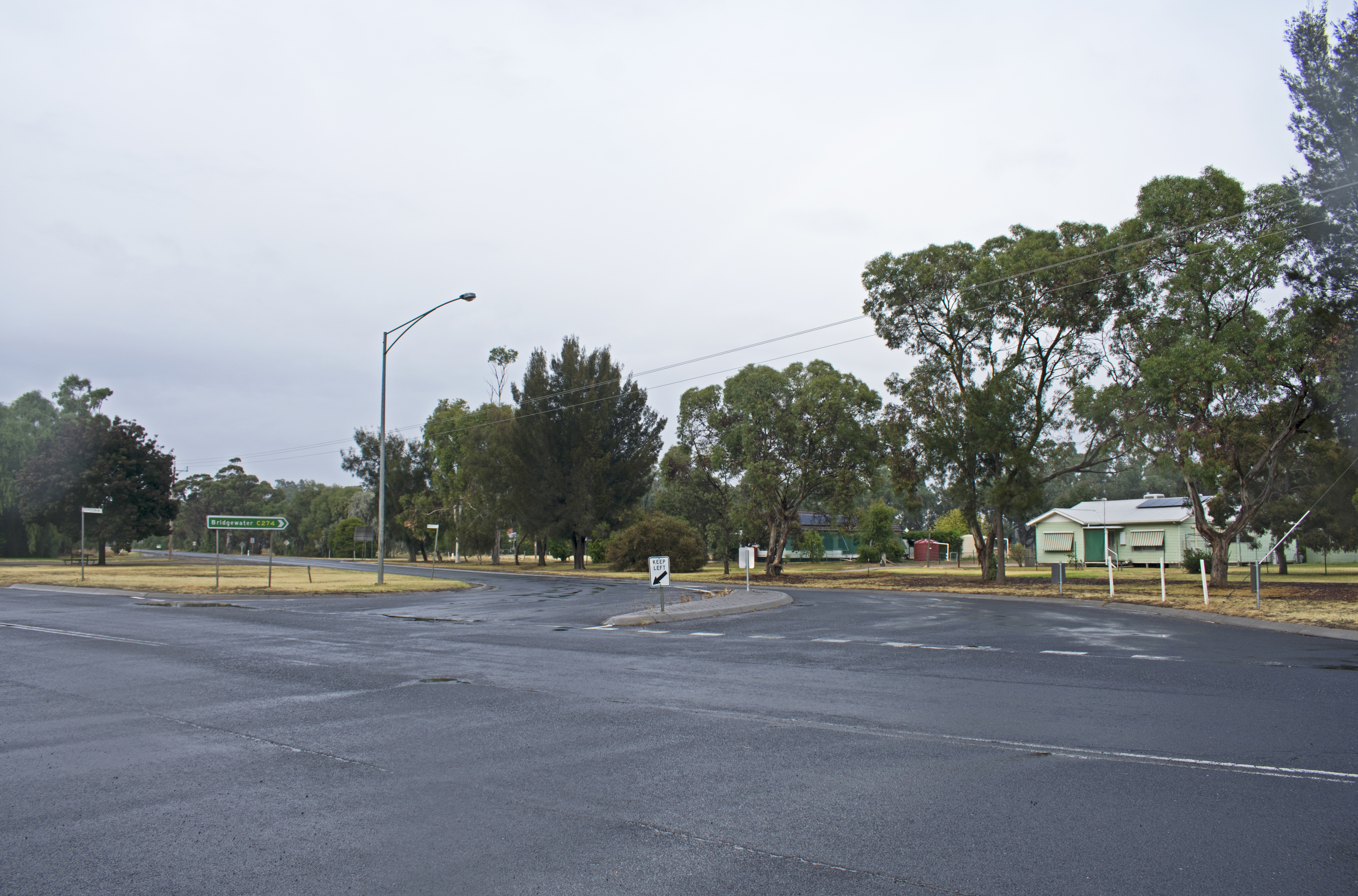
Branching of C274 and B260 in Serpentine

Most highways in Victoria are named after geographical regions and features, including river valleys and notable settlements. Others, such as the Western Highway and Northern Highway, are named for their radial direction heading away from Melbourne. Notable exceptions include some interstate and metropolitan highways, for example, the Hume Highway, named for early explorer Hamilton Hume.

The Victorian road numbering system for freeways and arterial roads consists of a letter and a number. The letter is determined by the quality and function of the route, the system contains four 'levels' of roads: M roads, A roads, B roads and C roads:

- M Roads provide consistently high quality road conditions and are always divided dual or more carriageways. M roads are the primary transport links between Melbourne and other capital cities or provincial centres. For example, the Eastern Freeway and EastLink make up the route with the official designation of the M3.

Bicycles (cyclists) are prohibited from Urban Freeways in Melbourne, however are permitted on Rural Freeways including sections within Melbourne's outer urban limits. Signs at the start of freeway entry ramps indicate whether pedestrians/bicycles are allowed ("NO Pedestrians, Bicycles, etc Beyond This Point, On This Freeway, Except With Authority"). Bicycles must stay in the left-hand shoulder (Emergency Stopping Lane) and upon interchanges follow the signed "Cyclists Cross Here With Care" at right angles on exit ramps, giving way to vehicles exiting, cross to the adjacent bullnose, to continue their journey. Cyclists must also obey signs indicating "Cyclists Must Exit" / "Cyclists Banned" / "No Bicycles Beyond This Point" where bicycles must exit at that ramp, then dismount, due to the freeway prohibiting bicycles downstream of that location, such as the freeway turning from a Rural into an Urban Freeway. The following are classified as Urban Freeways where cyclists are not permitted:

- West Gate Fwy
- Monash Fwy
- South Gippsland Fwy
- Frankston Fwy
- Mornington Peninsula Fwy
- Eastern Fwy
- Princes Fwy (east of Werribee)
- Princes Fwy East (west of Pakenham)
- Tullamarine Fwy
- Calder Fwy (east of Kings Rd)
- Hume Fwy (south of Donnybrook Rd)
- Western Ring Rd
- Metropolitan Ring Rd
- Western Fwy (east of Ballarat Rd)
- CityLink
- EastLink
- Peninsula Link
- West Gate Tunnel
- North East Link (under construction)

The following are classified as Rural Freeways where cyclists are permitted:

- Princes Fwy (west of Duncans Rd, Werribee)
- Princes Fwy East (east of Koo Wee Rup Rd, Pakenham)
- Hume Fwy (north of Donnybrook Rd, Kalkallo)
- Calder Fwy (west of Kings Rd, Taylors Lakes)
- Goulburn Valley Fwy
- Western Fwy (west of Ballarat Rd, Ravenhall)

While the Frankston Fwy, Mornington Peninsula Fwy and Peninsula Link are not technically in 'urban' areas, considered outer suburban or regional, these major arterials are classified as Urban Freeways, due to their closer proximity to Melbourne, larger populations, built up areas and higher traffic volumes. Where cyclists would pose a risk of danger from vehicles, including traffic movements such as weaving and merging at junctions and ramps. Therefore bicycles are not permitted on these freeways.

- A Roads serve the same purpose and provide the same high quality road conditions as M roads, the only difference being that A roads are single carriageways. A Roads also carry less traffic than M roads. For example, the Princes Highway west of Geelong is route number A1.
- B Roads are sealed roads wide enough to accommodate two lanes of traffic with good line markings, provide adequate shoulders and high quality and visibility signage. B roads are the primary transport links for regions not connected by either M or A roads, as well as major tourist routes, such as the Great Ocean Road (route number B100).
- C Roads are generally sealed two-lane roads with shoulders and serve as links between population centres and the major road network. For example, the Mount Dandenong Tourist Road is route number C415.

The Victorian road numbering system is based on a 'ring and spoke' system. The 'ring' highways (highways that circle Victoria) numbers are given in the multiple of hundreds e.g. Henty Highway (200), Murray Valley Highway (400) and Great Alpine Road (500) make the outermost ring. Midland Highway (300) and Maroondah Highway (300) is the inner ring.

The spokes generally incorporate National Route numbers. Otherwise, east-west aligned highways are given even numbers and north-south are given odd numbers. Highways and primary roads are given numbers in multiple of tens. Other roads are given other numbers that indicate general alignment.

Essentially, for freeways and arterial roads, of which VicRoads is the coordinating authority, the letter drawn from the quality and purpose of the route is added to the number as determined by the ring and spoke system to give a highway number that reflects the quality and alignment of the road.

== Legislation and governance ==
The prime transport statute in Victoria is the Transport Integration Act 2010. The Act establishes and sets the charters of the state agencies charged with integrating and coordinating the state's transport system and, as part of that activity, providing roads, managing network access and providing registration and licensing services. The Act establishes the Department of Transport as the agency responsible for the overall integration and planning of Victoria's transport system. In addition, the Act creates Victoria's key road agency, the Roads Corporation or VicRoads.

An important road regulation statute is the Road Management Act 2004, which regulates the management of Victoria's road network. The key statute that regulates Victoria's road safety is the Road Safety Act 1986.

Responsibility for road maintenance in Victoria is distributed. VicRoads maintains main roads, including secondary roads, while local government councils maintain local roads. There are also private roads. The federal government takes its own interest in national highways, and other roads of national interest, such as those that impact foreign trade.

== See also ==
- Driver's licence in Australia
- Rail transport in Victoria
- Road transport in Australia
- Speed limits in Australia
- Transport Integration Act
