= The Cheese Stick =

Sculpture in Melbourne, Australia

Melbourne International Gateway
- Cheesestick appears at about 20s into video
- Alternative names: The Cheese Stick

General information
- Location: Parkville, Melbourne, Australia
- Coordinates: 37.783249°S 144.939963°E
- Opened: 2000

Design and construction
- Architect: Denton Corker Marshall

The Melbourne International Gateway, colloquially known as The Cheese Stick or Cheesestick, is a giant yellow sculptural work and iconic roadside attraction over the CityLink toll road in the suburb of Parkville of Melbourne, the state capital of Victoria, Australia.

The artwork was designed by international architecture firm Denton Corker Marshall and opened in the year 2000, is now considered an iconic landmark. This part of the CityLink is a major connection between Melbourne Airport and the Central Business District.

The Cheese Stick is a yellow steel beam approximately 70 metres in length and it is accompanied by 39 smaller red beams. It was inspired by the Victorian gold rush in the 1850s, whilst the red beams of the art installation are to represent the wheat industry in the state.
