= West Gate Freeway =

Freeway in Melbourne, Australia

West Gate Freeway Victoria
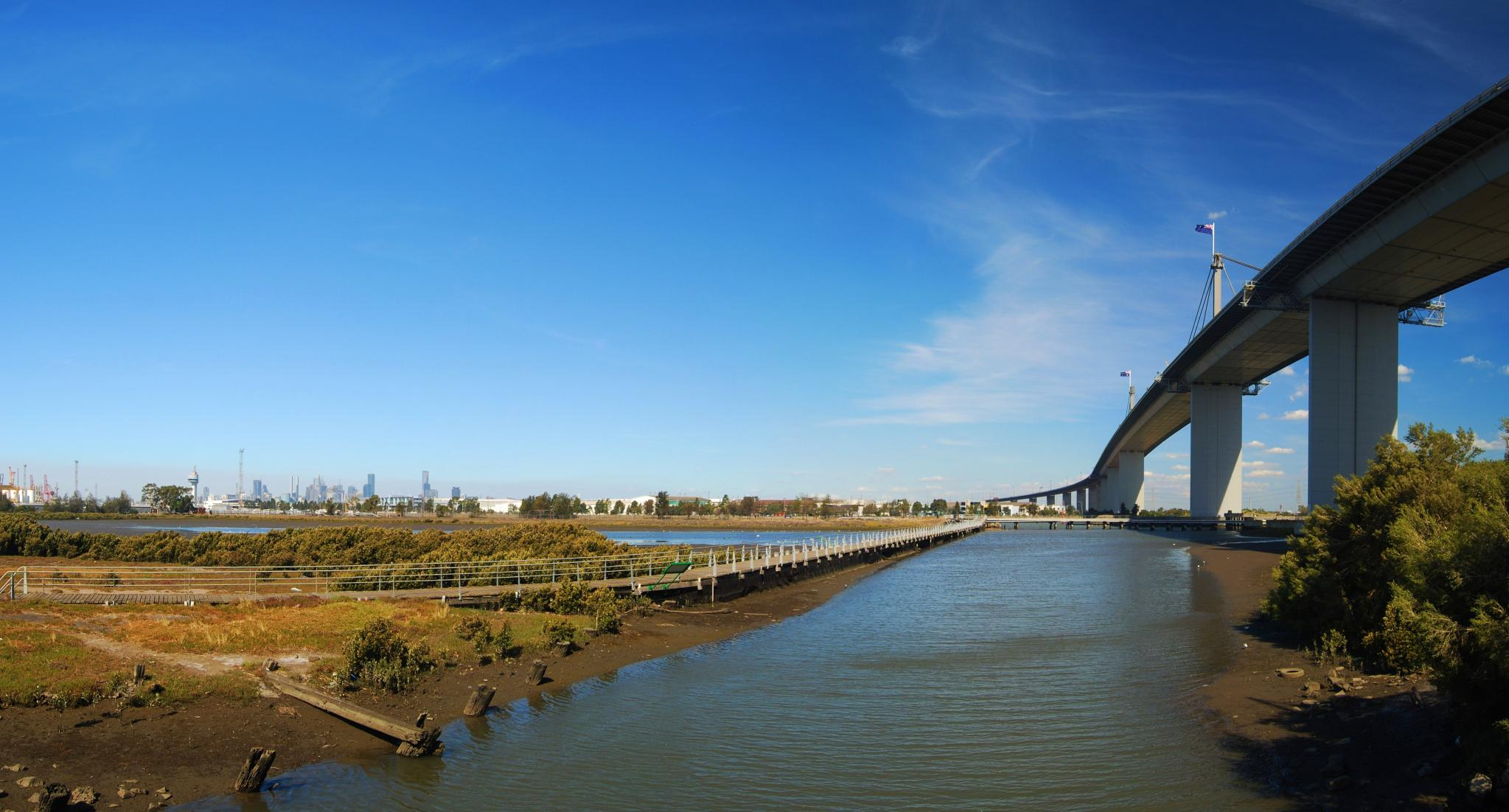
- West Gate Bridge looking towards Melbourne CBD
- Coordinates: 37.827632°S 144.817209°E (West end); 37.826840°S 144.964082°E (East end)

General information
- Type: Freeway
- Length: 13.7 km (8.5 mi)
- Opened: 1971–1988
- Route number(s): M1 (1996–present)
- Former route number: National Route 1 (1978–1996); Freeway Route 82 (1971–1988)
- Tourist routes: Tourist Drive 2 (1989–present) (Spotswood–Southbank)

Major junctions
- West end: Princes Freeway; Laverton North, Melbourne
- Western Ring Road; West Gate Tunnel; CityLink; Kings Way
- East end: CityLink; Southbank, Melbourne

Location(s)
- Major suburbs / towns: Altona North, Spotswood, Port Melbourne

Highway system
- Highways in Australia; National Highway • Freeways in Australia; Highways in Victoria

The West Gate Freeway is a major freeway in Melbourne, the busiest urban freeway and the busiest road in the city, carrying upwards of 200,000 vehicles per day. It links Geelong (via Princes Freeway) and Melbourne's western suburbs to central Melbourne and beyond. It is also a link between Melbourne and the west and linking industrial and residential areas west of the Yarra River with the city and port areas. The West Gate Bridge is a part of the freeway.

It is a fully managed freeway with a complete 'Freeway Management System' that is dynamically linked and adaptive to the entire M1 corridor. This includes the 2008 re-design of a substantial section. Overall, the freeway has between 4-6 lanes in each direction, with a maximum of 12 lanes at one point in its width.

== Route ==
West Gate Freeway commences at the West Gate Interchange in Laverton North, with ramps to and from the Western Ring Road, Princes Freeway and Princes Highway (Geelong Road), and heads east as a twelve-lane, four-carriageway road - the outer carriageways serving entry and exit ramps from connecting roads and the inner carriageways functioning as express lanes, in a local–express system - eventually reaching the interchanges with the portals to the West Gate Tunnel, where the freeway converges into a ten-lane, dual-carriageway road, crossing the Yarra River over the West Gate bridge, through Port Melbourne, and then becomes elevated for its remaining length and narrowing to eight lanes, with access ramps to Melbourne's central business district. Eastward beyond the Kings Way and Power Street exits, the freeway feeds directly into CityLink's Southern Link, connecting onwards through Melbourne's south-eastern suburbs through the Burnley and Domain Tunnels.

== History ==
The Country Roads Board (later VicRoads) was authorised by the government in December 1961 for a study to gather engineering and economic data for the provisioning of a toll crossing of the Lower Yarra River, from Salmon Street in Port Melbourne to Princes Highway in the vicinity of Kororoit Creek, a distance of 5.25 miles. Investigations included details of bores down to 8,000 feet and soil tests (completed on 29 June 1962), selective drilling and sampling in critical areas, and traffic studies, and at the time both a tunnel under and a bridge over the river were mooted. In February 1966, the Board was appointed as the design and construction authority for the Lower Yarra Crossing Project; the State government authorised the construction of a tolled bridge over the Yarra with eight lanes.

Construction began on the first section of Lower Yarra Freeway in the late 1960s and was open to traffic by 1971, stretching from Princes Highway just south of the intersection with Little Boundary Road in Laverton North (later enlarged and named the West Gate Interchange) eastwards to Melbourne/Williamstown Roads just west of the mouth of the Yarra. At the time, the only way to cross the Yarra west of the CBD was via a ferry crossing (the Yarra River punt service), which saw far heavier demands once Lower Yarra Freeway was officially opened.

The West Gate Bridge across the Yarra had started construction not too long before the opening of the freeway and, although delayed, when finally completed in 1978 allowed the freeway to extend over the river and directly into the CBD's south-western corner (via Rogers and Lorimer Streets). Renamed to West Gate Freeway to commemorate its opening, the freeway also attracted tolls from anyone using the bridge (between Melbourne/Williamstown Road and Rogers Street) between 16 November 1978 and 17 November 1985. The toll plaza was located on the city side of the bridge where the service stations are now located. National Route 1 – previously designated along Geelong Road (Princes Highway West) and through the CBD via Smithfield and Flemington Roads and King Street – was altered to use the freeway instead and rejoin Kings Way via Rogers, Lorimer and Clarendon Streets. As a result of the diverted traffic over the West Gate Bridge, the Yarra River punt service closed in 1979.

Due to the extra traffic the freeway was attracting—and due to the safety concerns of having excess traffic filter through connector streets in South Melbourne—the freeway was first extended to Johnson Street (today Montague Street) in 1985, and then finally to Kings Way above the Grant Street intersection using elevated carriageways; the eastbound carriageway opened in 1987, and the westbound carriageway opened nearly a year later in 1988. Expansion of the original two lane freeway on the western side of the bridge to three lanes each way was carried out in 1991, and expansion to four lanes followed in 2000. With the subsequent completion of the Western Ring Road joining the West Gate Interchange to the freeway's west and CityLink to the freeway's east, it also funnels traffic from northern and western suburbs around Melbourne, acting as a bypass freeway.

Lower Yarra Freeway was signed Freeway Route 82 upon opening in 1971, joined by National Route 1 when the West Gate Bridge opened in 1978, and both were extended onto new sections of West Gate Freeway as they opened during the 1980s; Freeway Route 82 was eventually removed in 1988. Tourist Route 2 also runs along the freeway from the Melbourne/Williamstown Road interchange in Spotswood and the Montague Street interchange in Port Melbourne. With Victoria's conversion to the newer alphanumeric system in the late 1990s, the freeway's National Route 1 designation began conversion to M1 in late 1996, and was completed in 1997.

The passing of the Road Management Act 2004 granted the responsibility of overall management and development of Victoria's major arterial roads to VicRoads: in 2004, VicRoads re-declared this road as West Gate Freeway (Freeway #1820), from Princes Freeway at Laverton North and ending at the ramps to Kings Way and Power Street in Southbank.

The original Lower Yarra Freeway was officially designated in the 1969 Melbourne Transportation Plan as the F9 Freeway corridor.

=== Timeline of construction ===
- 1971 – Lower Yarra Freeway, initial 4 miles (6.4 km) opened from Princes Highway to Williamstown Road on 7 April 1971, originally 3 lanes in each direction, at a cost of $14 million.
- 1978 – West Gate Bridge, opened 15 November 1978, by the Premier, the Hon. R J Hamer ED, MP; with freeway extension from the bridge to Rogers Street
- 1985 – Tolls removed from West Gate Bridge, 17 November 1985
- 1985 – Extended 1.5 km from Rogers Street to Johnson Street, opened December 1985
- 1987 – Extended 2.1 km from Johnson Street to Kings Way, single carriageway eastbound, opened December 1987
- 1988 – Extended 2.1 km from Johnson Street to Kings Way, single carriageway westbound, opened October 1988; total cost for both carriageways to Kings Way/Power Street $185 million
- 1991 – Widening to three lanes in both directions between Princes Highway and Millers Road. (this possibly conflicts with information given in CRB's 58th Annual Report, which states the freeway opened with three lanes in each direction in 1971, whilst omitting that the third lane only existed between Millers Road and Williamstown Road).
- 2000 – Widening to four lanes in both directions between the West Gate Bridge and Laverton.

=== 2008–11 upgrade ===
Traffic volumes on West Gate Freeway have grown steadily since opening, carrying up to 180,000 vehicles every day. Congestion frequently occurs at the Montague Street and Bolte Bridge interchanges due to conflicting traffic movements on and off the freeway. On 1 May 2008 the Minister for Roads and Ports Tim Pallas announced design details for the West Gate Freeway improvements, to assist in maintaining rapidly growing volume capacity and to reduce congestion.

They are:

- a full freeway management system, made up of Ramp Metering (Signalling), Lane Use Management Signs (overhead lane availability / variable speed zones), electronic on-road message signs, arterial road message signs, CCTV cameras and a suite of freeway traffic algorithms and software with data stations, thousands of sensors and a core server at the VicRoads TMC. Previously wind warning lights were used to reduce the speed limit during high winds but it could only limit speed to either 40 km/h or 60 km/h.
- the addition of a new elevated road structure joining the outbound Kings Way on-ramp to the Freeway
- new traffic ramps over Montague Street
- an additional dedicated exit ramp from the Bolte Bridge to the Freeway
- widening of the freeway between Todd Road and Montague Street
- redesign of the Montague Street interchange.

These works help reduce merging and weaving movements at key points on the freeway, leading to a smoother traffic flow and improved driver safety. As part of the works the Montague Street on-ramp city-bound had been closed for approximately 18 months to enable the new one to be built.

Early works on the freeway, including geo-technical investigations and service proving, commenced in late 2007. In early 2008 construction works started on freeway widening, specifically in the South Melbourne area. New traffic lanes and ramps have been completed and opened in different stages with the total project eventually completed and opened to traffic in June 2011. The project was awarded the 2011 Australian Construction Achievement Award.

=== 2018–25 West Gate Tunnel upgrades ===
The stretch of freeway between the interchange with Western Ring Road and the western foot of the West Gate Bridge (where the West Gate Tunnel portals would eventually be constructed) were completely rebuilt, in order to support the extra traffic fed from the West Gate Tunnel. The original 8-lane, dual-carriageway arrangement was replaced with a twelve-lane, four-carriageway local–express system, existing interchanges were upgraded or rebuilt, and a new interchange with Hyde Street was also constructed. This upgraded section of the freeway is also now tolled for all heavy commercial vehicles (and for all traffic for the Hyde Street interchange) since the opening of the West Gate Tunnel on 14 December 2025.

== Exits and interchanges ==
LGA	Location	km	mi	Exit (Note: As signed)	Destinations	Notes
Melbourne	Southbank	0.0	0.0		CityLink (M1) – Kooyong, Chadstone, Narre Warren, Pakenham	Eastern terminus of freeway, continues as Southern Link through Domain Tunnel (westbound) and Burnley Tunnel (eastbound)
Melbourne	Southbank	0.0	0.0	W1	Power Street – Southbank	Westbound and eastbound exit only
Melbourne	Southbank	0.3	0.19	W2	Kings Way (Alt National Route 1) – St Kilda, Caulfield, Dandenong	Eastbound exit to and westbound entrance from the south only
Melbourne	Southbank	1.6	0.99	W3	Montague Street (Metro Routes 30/55/Tourist Route 2 north) – Docklands; Montague Street (Metro Route 30 south) – South Melbourne	Eastern terminus of concurrency with Tourist Drive 2
Melbourne	Port Melbourne	3.1	1.9	W4	CityLink (M2) – Tullamarine, Melbourne Airport	Trumpet interchange with local-express lanes; westbound exit on local lanes
Melbourne	Port Melbourne	4.4	2.7	W5	Todd Road / Cook Street – Fishermans Bend	Westbound exit part of local lanes containing exit W4
Yarra River		4.9– 7.4	3.0– 4.6	West Gate Bridge		
Hobsons Bay–Maribyrnong boundary	Spotswood–Yarraville boundary	8	5.0	W5A	Hyde Street (Metro Route 35/Tourist Route 2) – Footscray, Spotswood	Eastbound exit only, westbound entrance via Simcock Avenue; Exit and entrance toll points for cars, motorcycles and light vehicles only
Hobsons Bay–Maribyrnong boundary	Spotswood–Yarraville boundary	8	5.0	W6	Williamstown Road (Metro Route 37/Tourist Route 2 north) – Footscray; Melbourne Road (Metro Route 37 south) – Williamstown, Scienceworks Museum	Western terminus of concurrency with Tourist Drive 2
Hobsons Bay–Maribyrnong boundary	Spotswood–Yarraville boundary	8.9	5.5	W5B	West Gate Tunnel (M4) – Port of Melbourne, City, Melbourne Airport	Eastbound exit only
Hobsons Bay–Maribyrnong boundary	Altona North–Yarraville boundary	9.6	6.0		West Gate Tunnel (M4) – Port of Melbourne, City, Melbourne Airport	Westbound entrance only
Hobsons Bay	Altona North–Brooklyn boundary	10.0	6.2	Toll Point (for heavy vehicles only)		
Hobsons Bay	Altona North–Brooklyn boundary	10.8	6.7	W7	Millers Road (Metro Route 41) – Brooklyn, Seaholme	
Hobsons Bay	Altona North–Brooklyn boundary	12.5	7.8	W8	Grieve Parade (Metro Route 39) – Brooklyn, Altona	Westbound exit and eastbound entrance only
Hobsons Bay	Altona North–Laverton North boundary	13.3	8.3	W9	Geelong Road (Metro Route 83) – Brooklyn, Footscray	Eastbound exit and westbound entrance only
Hobsons Bay	Altona North–Laverton North boundary	13.7	8.5	W10	Western Ring Road (M80 / Tourist Route 21) – Ardeer, Fawkner, Greensborough, Melbourne Airport	
Hobsons Bay	Altona North–Laverton North boundary	13.7	8.5		Princes Freeway (M1 / Tourist Route 21) – Werribee, Geelong, Avalon Airport	Western terminus of freeway; continues southwest as Princes Freeway
1.000 mi = 1.609 km; 1.000 km = 0.621 mi: Concurrency terminus; Incomplete access; Tolled; Route transition

=== Freeway map ===
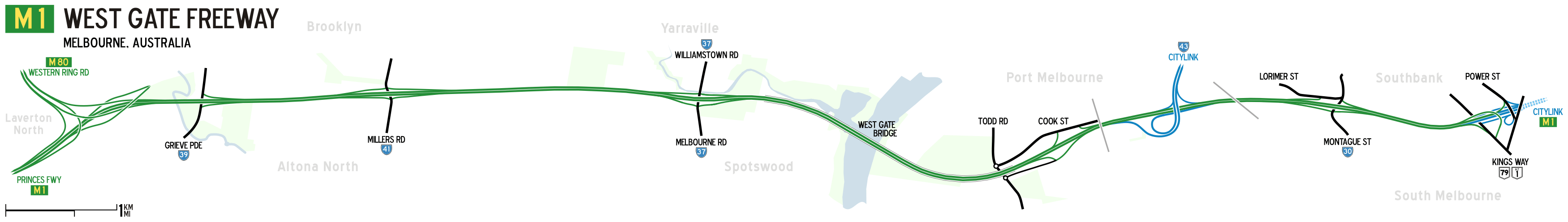

== Tolls ==
Tolls were introduced on the West Gate Freeway with the opening on the West Gate Tunnel on 14 December 2025. As part of the opening, there will be a temporary toll-free period for all toll points on weekends during January 2026.

=== Light vehicles ===
Light vehicles such as cars, motorcycles and light commercial vehicles are not tolled on the West Gate Freeway unless they are accessing the West Gate Tunnel or Hyde Street ramps.

=== Heavy vehicles ===
Heavy commercial vehicles are tolled at a heavy vehicle toll point on the West Gate Freeway between Millers Road and Hyde Street. These tolls also automatically cover the use of West Gate Tunnel and its connector roads to the city, or the Hyde Street on and off-road ramps, without incurring additional tolls. The toll applies to all heavy vehicles passing through the toll point even if they are not accessing the tunnel or Hyde Street ramps, such as entering or exiting anywhere else on the freeway or using the West Gate Bridge.

Heavy vehicles using other parts of the freeway are not tolled as long as they do not pass through the toll point. However, 24-hour No Truck zones have been implemented on nearby parallel local roads so that heavy vehicles do not detour around the toll point via these roads. Exemptions are in place for local heavy vehicles to access areas within the zones.

Toll prices as of 1 July 2025
Toll road	Toll section or toll points	Maximum toll price per trip					Toll increase	Toll concessionaire	Expiry of toll concession
Toll road	Toll section or toll points	Cars	Motorcycles	Light Commercial Vehicles	Heavy Commercial Vehicles	Long Heavy Commercial Vehicles	Toll increase	Toll concessionaire	Expiry of toll concession
West Gate Freeway	Between Millers Road and Williamstown Road	No toll			$19.78 (Note: Price shown is the daytime price. Nighttime price is $13.19.)	$29.67 (Note: Price shown is the daytime price. Nighttime price is $19.78.)	Quarterly on 1 January, 1 April, 1 July, and 1 October by 1.04597% (Note: These are equivalent to fixed increases of 4.25% annually and are only until 30 June 2029. From 1 July 2029, quarterly increases will be determined by CPI)	Transurban	13 January 2045
West Gate Freeway	Hyde Street ramps	$4.09	$2.05	$6.54	No additional tolls, toll already covered by West Gate Freeway toll charges		Quarterly on 1 January, 1 April, 1 July, and 1 October by 1.04597%	Transurban	13 January 2045
West Gate Tunnel	Within tunnel	$4.09	$2.05	$6.54	No additional tolls, toll already covered by West Gate Freeway toll charges		Quarterly on 1 January, 1 April, 1 July, and 1 October by 1.04597%	Transurban	13 January 2045
West Gate Tunnel	City exit to Footscray Road, Dynon Road and Wurundjeri Way (eastbound only and AM peak (Note: AM peak period is 7am–9am weekdays, excluding public holidays) only)	$6.54	$3.27	$10.47	No additional tolls, toll already covered by West Gate Freeway toll charges		Quarterly on 1 January, 1 April, 1 July, and 1 October by 1.04597%	Transurban	13 January 2045
Combined West Gate (Note: The heavy vehicle toll point on the West Gate Freeway covers the freeway and the West Gate Tunnel) & CityLink trip	Combined Heavy Vehicle Trip Cap	N/A			$36.81 (Note: Price shown is the daytime price. Nighttime price is $24.54.)	$55.22 (Note: Price shown is the daytime price. Nighttime price is $36.81.)	Quarterly on 1 January, 1 April, 1 July, and 1 October by 1.04597%	Transurban	13 January 2045

== See also ==
- Freeways in Australia
- Freeways in Melbourne
- Road transport in Victoria
- West Gate Bridge
