= Domain Tunnel =

Road tunnel in Melbourne, Victoria, Australia

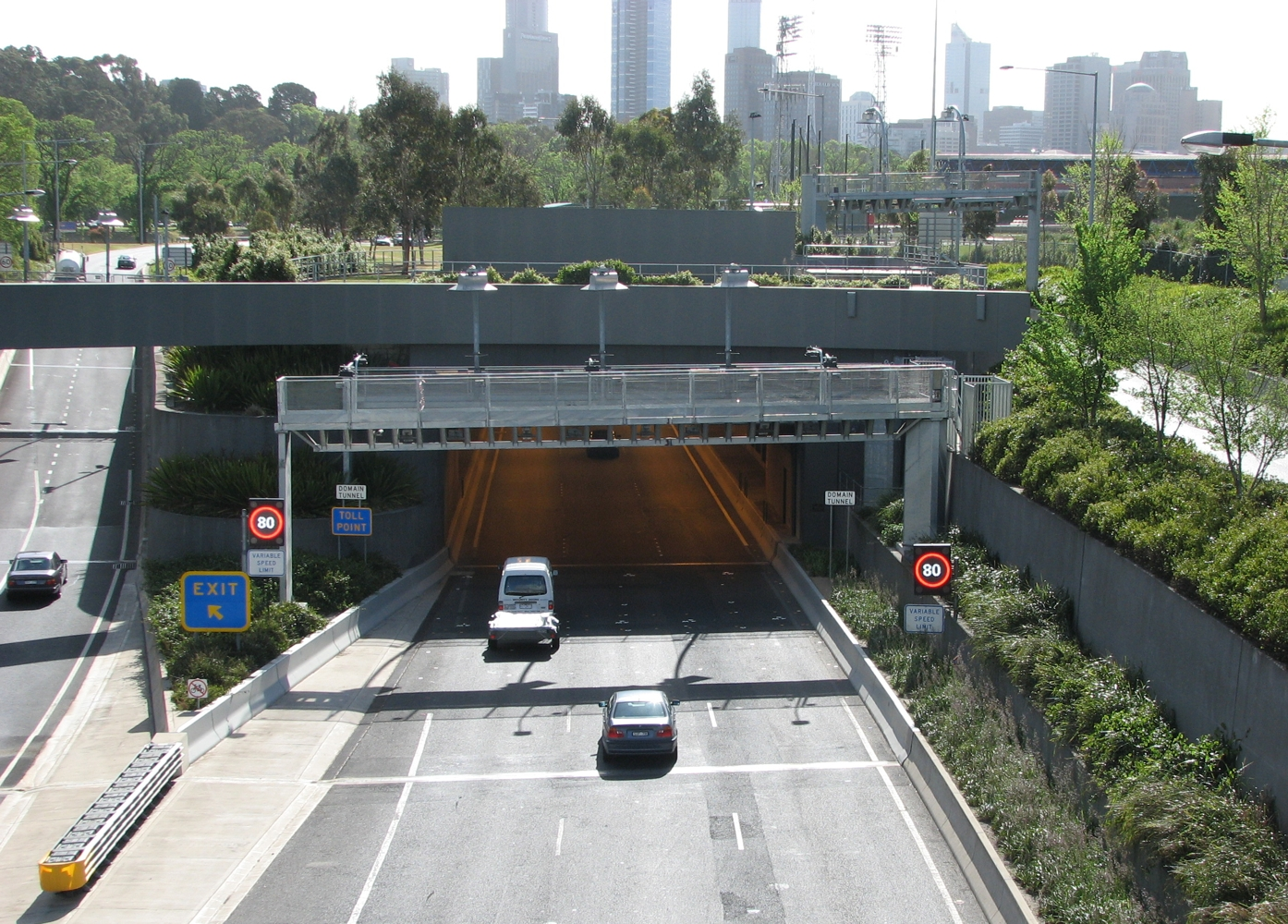
- The Domain Tunnel entrance adjacent to the Batman Avenue exit ramp
- Interactive map of Domain Tunnel

Overview
- Location: Melbourne, Australia
- Coordinates: 37.8253°S 144.9756°E
- Status: Active
- Route: CityLink tollway westbound
- Start: Southbank
- End: Richmond

Operation
- Constructed: Roadheader and cut and cover
- Opened: 16 April 2000
- Operator: Transurban
- Traffic: Automotive
- Character: Controlled access highway

Technical
- Length: 1.6 km (0.99 mi)
- No. of lanes: 3 lanes
- Operating speed: 80 km/h

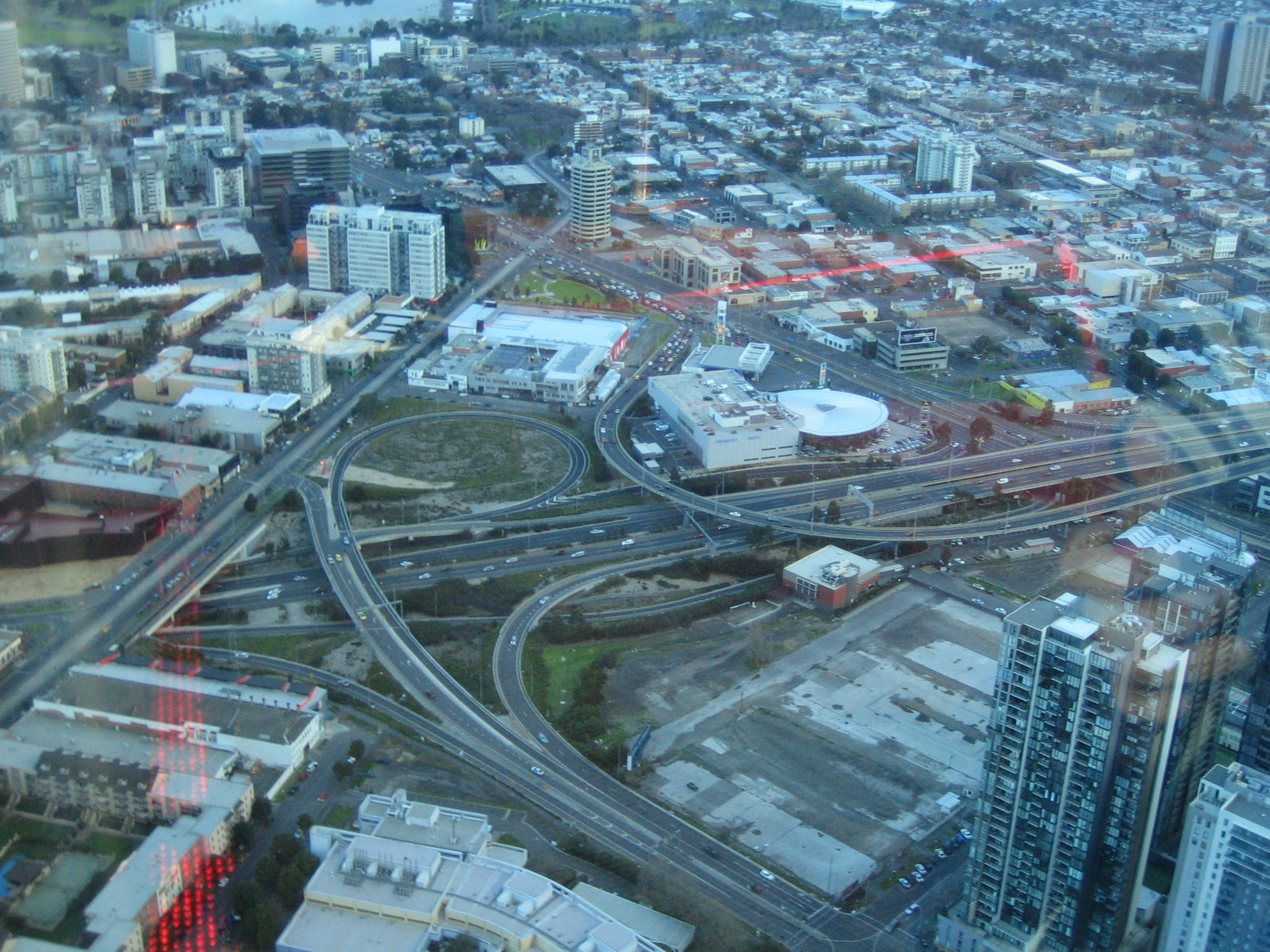
Interchange consisting of the Burnley Tunnel entrance, Domain Tunnel entrance, Westgate freeway and Power Street/Kings Way ramps

The Domain Tunnel is a road tunnel located in Melbourne, Australia, which carries traffic westbound from the Monash Freeway to the West Gate Freeway, running under the Yarra River and Kings Domain. The tunnel is part of the CityLink Tollway operated by Transurban and provides a bypass of the central business district.

== History ==
The tunnel was constructed between 1996 and 1999 by Transfield-Obayashi Joint Venture. It was officially opened to traffic on 16 April 2000 with a temporary 60 km/h speed limit, and was free to use until 26 April.

On 23 March 2007 just before 10am, three trucks and four cars collided in the Burnley Tunnel. The crash resulted in multiple explosions and a subsequent fire. This forced the evacuation of motorists from the Burnley Tunnel. The Domain Tunnel was closed and any drivers in the Domain Tunnel at the time drove out normally. Cross passage tunnels between the Domain and Burnley Tunnels were used by evacuees to exit from the Burnley Tunnel into the Domain Tunnel.

In May 2007 a dramatic incident involving a truck and a sedan was caught by an A Current Affair film crew investigating the safety of the tunnel in light of previous events. Authorities are currently investigating if the crew, who were driving vehicles in the tunnel, may have contributed in instigating the crash.

== Design ==
The Domain Tunnel is 1.6 km long and comprises 460 metres of cut and cover tunnel at the west end, 680 metres of driven tunnel and 500m of cut and cover which includes a shallow river crossing. The western portal is shared with the longer Burnley Tunnel that carries traffic in the other direction. Roadheaders were used to dig the bored section of tunnel, while at the eastern end the 170-metre final section of cut and cover was built under the Yarra River, with a cofferdam being moved as construction continued, permitting the river to keep flowing. The tunnel carries three 3.5-metre wide traffic lanes with 0.5-metre wide shoulders, and has two cross tunnels to the Domain Tunnel. The road level is a maximum depth of 40 metres, and has a gradient of less than 2%.

Regular radio transmission cannot be received while in the tunnel. Commercial stations have installed their own transmitters. A variable speed limit applies in the tunnel. In normal circumstances, the speed limit is 80 km/h. During maintenance, a 40 km/h speed limit applies and normal radio broadcast is regularly interrupted by announcements.

== See also ==
- Burnley Tunnel, the east-bound tunnel running parallel to the Domain Tunnel.
