= Burnley Tunnel =

Road tunnel in Melbourne, Victoria, Australia

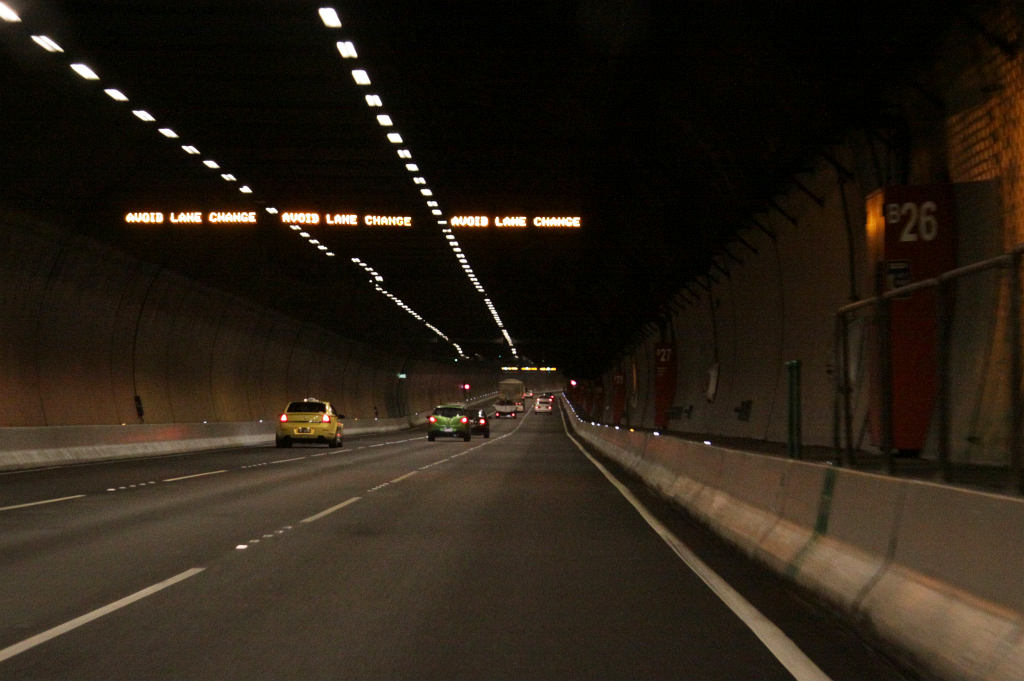
- Driving through the tunnel in 2010
- Interactive map of Burnley Tunnel

Overview
- Location: Melbourne, Victoria, Australia
- Coordinates: 37°49′28″S 144°58′52″E
- Status: Active
- Route: CityLink tollway eastbound
- Start: Olympic Boulevard; Burnley, Victoria - Burnley, Melbourne
- End: West Gate Freeway; Southbank, Victoria - Southbank, Melbourne

Operation
- Constructed: Roadheader with some cut and cover
- Opened: 22 December 2000; 25 years ago
- Operator: Transurban
- Traffic: Automotive
- Character: Limited access highway

Technical
- Length: 3.4 km (2.1 mi)
- No. of lanes: 3
- Operating speed: 80 km/h (50 mph)

The Burnley Tunnel is a tollway tunnel in Melbourne, in Victoria, Australia, which carries traffic eastbound from the West Gate Freeway to the Monash Freeway. It is part of the CityLink Tollway operated by Transurban. Running under the Yarra River and the inner suburbs of Richmond and Burnley, the tunnel provides a bypass of the central business district.

== History ==
The tunnel was constructed between 1996 and 2000 by Transfield–Obayashi Corporation Joint Venture. Prior to its opening to traffic, the tunnel was opened to the public to walk through from Southbank to Burnley, on 16 December 2000.

The tunnel was opened to traffic on 22 December 2000. The first known person to enter the tunnel as a paying client was Ben Johnstone during which time the whole process was played out live on 3AW. In February 2001 it was found that a wall panel was cracked with 5 litres of water per second entering the tunnel. The cause was later found to be floor sections lifting from water pressure, and modifications to correct this being approved in November 2001. Also in 2001 Transfield Obayashi Joint Venture agreed to pay Transurban $157 million in damages in an out-of-court settlement over late completion of the tunnel.

Transurban launched further legal action against the Transfield Obayashi Joint Venture in 2007, after radar tests indicated the tunnel walls were thinner than that specified in the contract, possibly resulting in the tunnel not lasting for the proposed 100-year design life. Further tunnel leaks were also discovered in 2007, but were unrelated to the tunnel fire. When Transurban hands the tunnel over to the Victorian government in 2045 (state government approved an extension to the toll contract from 2034, in order to fund West Gate Tunnel), after 45 years in service, it must do so with the tunnel in the condition that it will have a 55-year operational life.

== 2007 fire ==
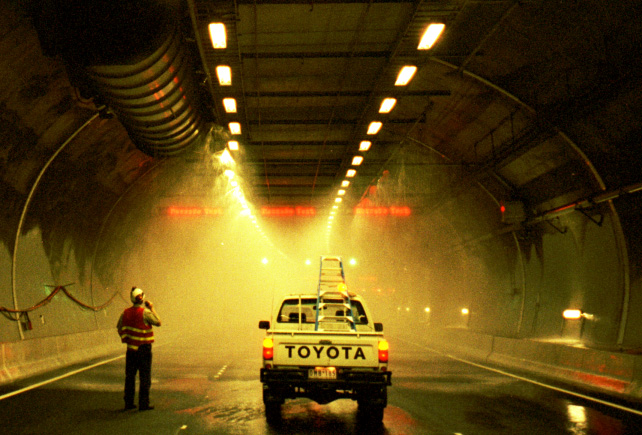
Fire suppression system test before tunnel opening in December 2000

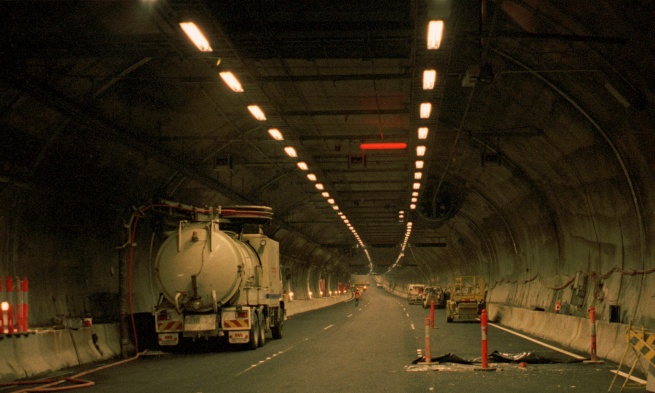
View in December 2000, just before opening

On 23 March 2007, just before 10 am, a pile-up occurred in the tunnel involving three trucks and four cars. The crash resulted in an explosion and a subsequent fire which reached temperatures in excess of 1,000 °C (1,832 °F) according to firefighters, and forced the evacuation of motorists from both the Burnley and nearby Domain tunnels. Three people died in the accident: Geoff Kennard, 51; Damian McDonald, an Australian cyclist who won a gold medal in the road team time trial at the 1994 Commonwealth Games in Victoria, Canada, and also represented Australia at the 1996 Summer Olympics; and Darren Hartley Sporn, a father of two daughters, who owned a plumbing business. Approximately 400 people were advised by the tunnel's safety system to abandon their cars, to leave their keys in the ignition, and to evacuate the tunnel after the collision.

The accident occurred after a truck suffered a blown tyre and stopped in the left lane. Safety systems allegedly closed the left lane and a response vehicle was on its way to assist the broken-down truck. Two cars traveling in the left hand lane had come up behind the broken-down truck and were attempting to merge into the centre lane. Another truck travelling in the left lane above speed limit, came up behind them and also attempted to merge to the right, but it failed to either stop behind the stationary vehicles or merge successfully. It then collided with vehicles in both the left and middle lanes, resulting in a multi-vehicle pile up involving 4 cars and three trucks. It is believed an explosion resulted from the ignition of a ruptured fuel tank of a vehicle involved in the crash.

The following traffic came to a stop and approximately 200 vehicles became stranded inside the tunnel. The Public Address & Radio Rebroadcast Systems advised motorists to turn off their ignition, leave the keys in, and to evacuate the tunnel. Emergency exits are located throughout the tunnel and lead to separate pedestrian tunnels. Some motorists walked the 1 km back along the roadway to the western tunnel entrance. Approximately 400 people were evacuated, three of whom were taken to hospital. Hundreds waited at the tunnel's west entrance until emergency services advised it was safe to remove their vehicles. The tunnel suffered some damage to cables and other internal infrastructure, but is believed the structure was undamaged by the fire.

Eighty-four firefighters responded within five minutes of the crash occurring and emergency personnel were able to gain access to the Burnley tunnel on foot via a separate emergency tunnel linking the Burnley to the Domain tunnel. Fire hoses were carried through to the crash site while emergency vehicles were stationed in the Domain Tunnel. A number of fire appliances were transported contra-flow from the exit portal of the tunnel to the crash site. The deluge system was activated instantly and this was deemed by firefighters to have greatly aided in keeping the fire under control. The smoke extraction system functioned as planned and removed toxic fumes from the tunnel and out into the open air. Smoke was vented to the ventilation stack in Southbank.

Metropolitan Ambulance Service Paramedics were sent in to treat evacuees if required. St John Ambulance Australia emergency medical teams were also put on standby in case the accident was deemed as a major disaster and many more injured and fatalities had arisen.

The driver of the speeding truck was found guilty of dangerous driving and was sentenced to five years in jail.

== Design ==
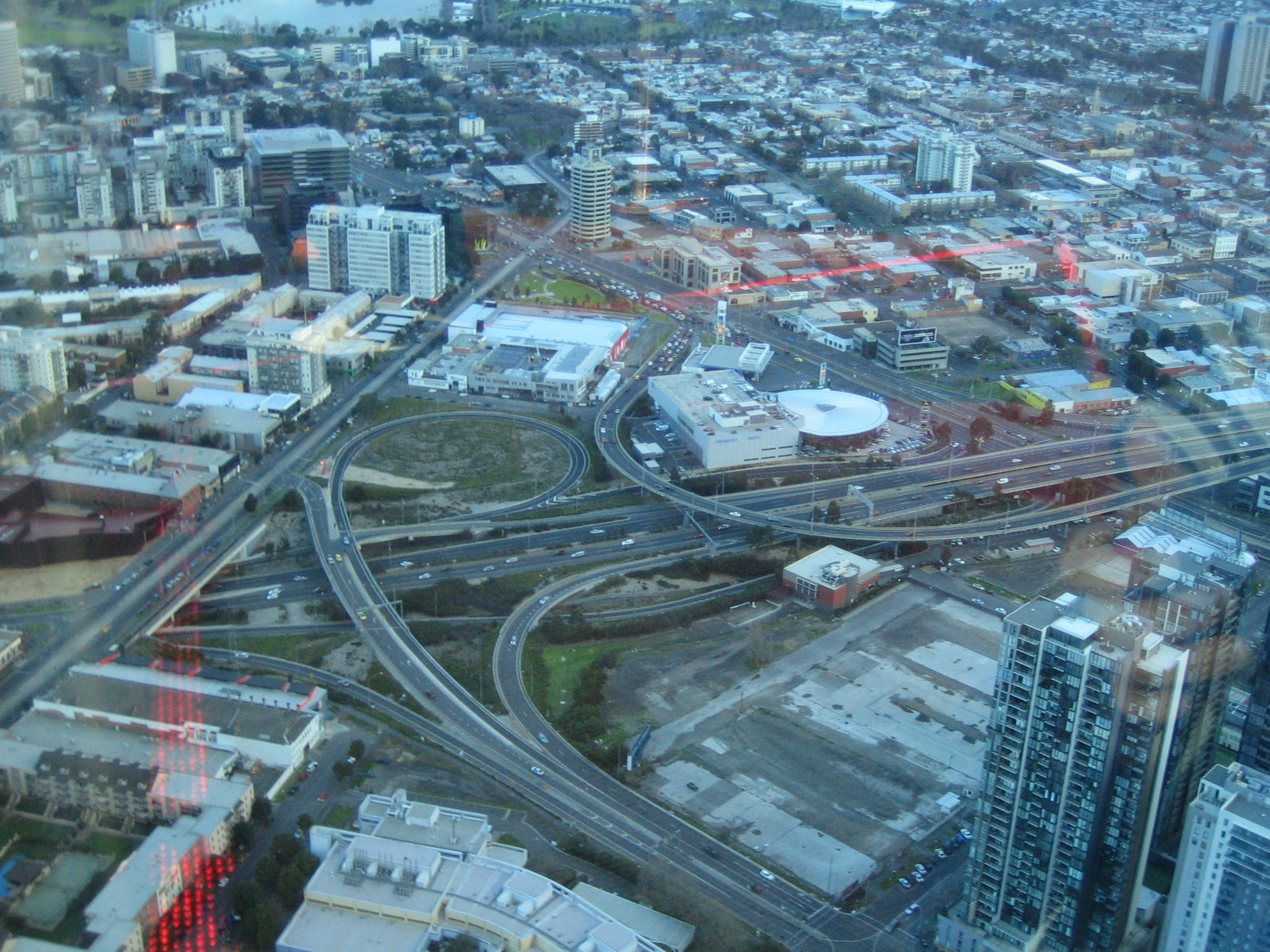
Interchange consisting of the Burnley Tunnel entrance, Domain Tunnel entrance, Westgate freeway and Power Street/Kings Way ramps

The Burnley Tunnel is 3.4 kilometres (2.1 mi) long and comprises 460 metres (1,509 ft) of cut and cover at the west portal, 2.84 km (1.76 mi) of driven tunnel, and 180 m (591 ft) of cut and cover at the east portal. The gradient at the west end is 6.2% downhill for traffic, then relatively level until a 5.2% grade out of the tunnel. During construction a shaft located at the midpoint of the tunnel was used to speed up work, as it provided another two working faces for the roadheaders used. The shaft is today used for ventilation and emergency egress, in addition to a 1,420-metre-long (4,659 ft) pedestrian tunnel that parallels the eastern part of the tunnel. Eight cross passages link the main and emergency tunnels, two more cross connects provide an emergency exit to the Domain Tunnel, and two emergency refuges are also located in the tunnel. Unlike the shallower and shorter Domain Tunnel, it passes deep under the Yarra River. It was subject to significant engineering problems and delays during construction due to unexpectedly high water pressures at its maximum depth of 65 m (213 ft).

A variable speed limit applies to traffic in the tunnel. In normal circumstances the speed limit is 80 km/h (50 mph), but a 40 km/h (25 mph) speed limit applies during maintenance. The speed limit during peak periods is often reduced to 60 km/h (37 mph) to prevent unnecessary congestion at the Monash Freeway. Regular AM and FM radio transmissions can be received while in the tunnel because the tunnel operator has installed re-broadcast transmitters. Normal radio broadcasts can be interrupted by management announcements over all channels.

== See also ==
- Domain Tunnel, the westbound tunnel running parallel to the Burnley Tunnel.
