= CityLink =

Tollway network in Melbourne, Victoria, Australia

CityLink Victoria
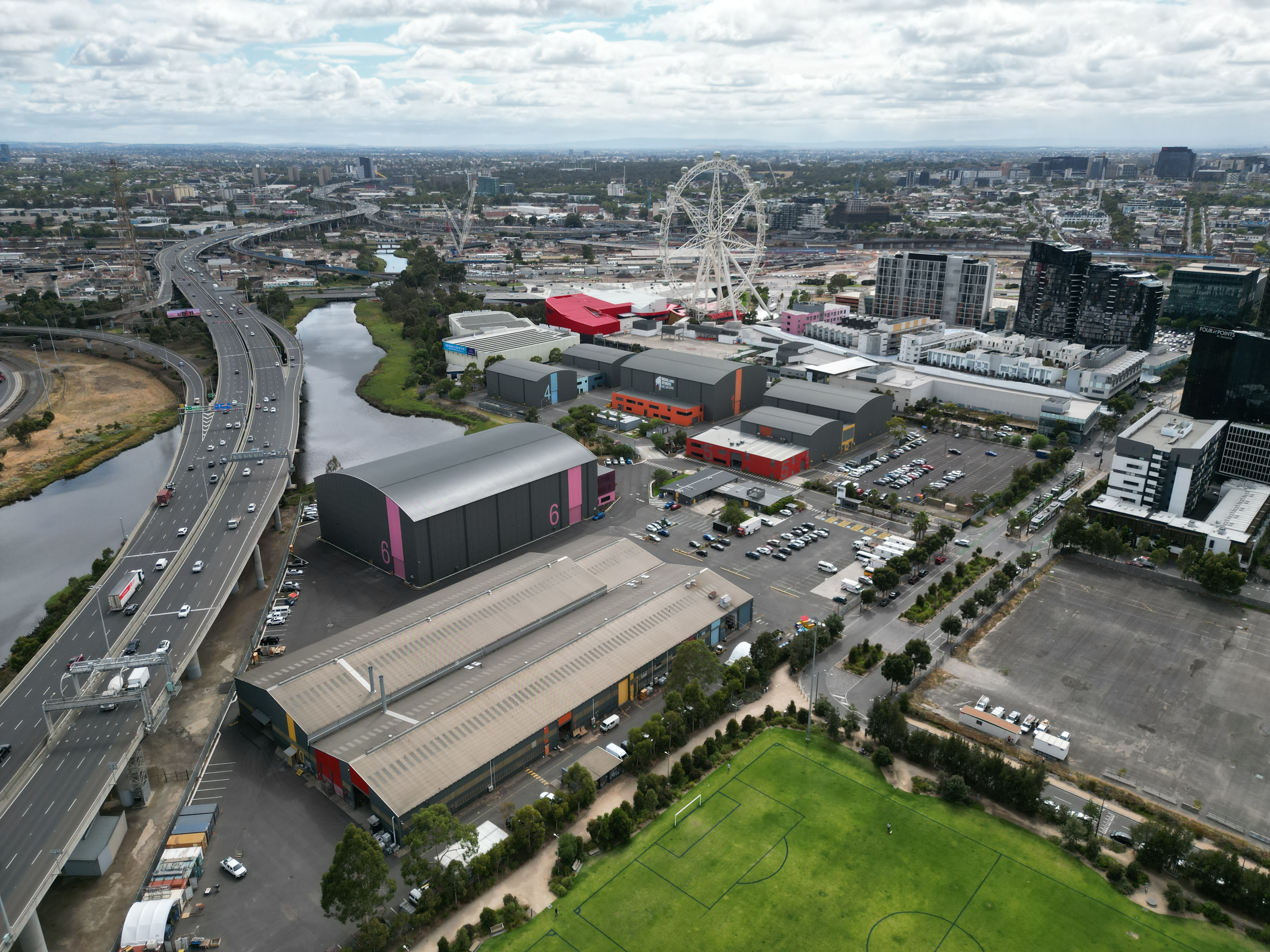

- Coordinates: 37.735340°S 144.904473°E (Northwest end); 37.844728°S 145.039619°E (Southeast end)

General information
- Type: Freeway
- Location: Melbourne
- Length: 21 km (13 mi)
- Opened: 1999
- Maintained by: Transurban
- Route number(s): M2 (2018–present) (Western Link); M1 (1999–present) (Southern Link)
- Former route number: Metro Route 43 (1999–2018) (Western Link); M1 (1999–2000) (Batman Avenue: through Melbourne); National Route 79 (1970–2013) (Western Link: Strathmore–Travancore)

Major junctions
Western Link
- North end: Tullamarine Freeway; Strathmore, Melbourne
- Bulla Road; Bell Street; Pascoe Vale Road; Brunswick Road; Flemington Road; Racecourse Road; Dynon Road; Footscray Road; West Gate Tunnel
- South end: West Gate Freeway; Port Melbourne, Melbourne
Southern Link
- West end: West Gate Freeway; Southbank, Melbourne
- Kings Way; Power Street; Punt Road; Yarra Boulevard; Toorak Road
- East end: Monash Freeway; Kooyong, Melbourne
Batman Avenue
- Northwest end: Exhibition Street; Melbourne, Victoria
- Flinders Street; Olympic Boulevard
- Southeast end: CityLink; Melbourne, Victoria

Highway system
- Highways in Australia; National Highway • Freeways in Australia; Highways in Victoria

CityLink is a network of tollways in Melbourne, Victoria, Australia, linking the Tullamarine, West Gate and Monash Freeways and incorporating Bolte Bridge, Burnley Tunnel and other works. In 1996, Transurban was awarded the contract to augment two existing freeways and construct two new toll roads – labelled the Western and Southern Links – directly linking a number of existing freeways to provide a continuous, high-capacity road route to, and around, the central business district. CityLink uses a free-flow tolling electronic toll collection system, called e-TAG. CityLink is currently maintained by Transurban.

== History ==
The first mention of a southern and western inner city bypass was in the 1969 Melbourne Transportation Plan. The plan advocated for reservations and set aside sinking funds for the new inner city freeway system. It was one of the few freeways connecting to the inner city (along with the Eastern Freeway to Clifton Hill) which was not later abandoned.

The proposal to build CityLink was first announced in May 1992 and received the state government's formal approval in mid-1994. The contract was awarded in 1995 to the Transurban Consortium of Transfield Holdings and Obayashi Corporation. Transurban was formed in March 1996 to operate CityLink when completed. The total value of the project was estimated in 1996 at about $1.8 billion, and the concession to operate the road was initially due to expire in 2034. This concession was later extended, and is now due to expire in 2045.

CityLink was built by the Transfield Obayashi joint venture under contract to Transurban between 1996 and 2000. The design and construction of the Western Link was subcontracted to Baulderstone Hornibrook, and the supply of the electronic tolling system was subcontracted to Translink Systems, a company jointly owned by Transfield Holdings and Transroute of France. The ongoing operation and maintenance of City Link was subcontracted by Transurban to Translink Operations, also jointly owned by Transfield and Transroute, which would manage the performance of CityLink assets. In May 1999, the operations were reorganised, with Transurban taking over the customer service operations from Translink Operations, who would retain responsibility for management of the tolling system, roadside assistance and maintenance.

The CityLink project was eight times larger than any other road project in Melbourne of that time. Toll plazas for manual tolling were deemed impractical, and delays associated with plaza operations would have decreased the advantages of using the new road. The decision to use only electronic toll collection was made in 1992; at a time when there was little practical experience of such systems. The first of the sections opened to traffic in 15 August 1999, with tolling commencing on 3 January 2000 before final completion occurred on 28 December 2000 with tolling commencing the same year.

When CityLink opened in 1999, the Southern Link was signed as M1 and the Western Link was signed as Metropolitan Route 43. Metropolitan Route 43 previously terminated at the Tullamarine Freeway/Calder Freeway interchange but it was extended along CityLink to end in Port Melbourne. Whilst National Route 79 officially remained part of the Western Link from the opening until 2013 (as the previous Tullamarine Freeway carried this designation from Calder Freeway to Flemington Road), CityLink signage did not show any National Route 79 signage and was exclusively signed as Metropolitan Route 43. With Victoria's conversion to the newer alphanumeric system in the late 1990s, Metropolitan Route 43 slowly began transition to M2 and was finally replaced with M2 in 2018. Despite this, a number of Metropolitan Route 43 shields remain visible to this day.

The passing of the Road Management Act 2004 granted the responsibility of overall management and development of Victoria's major arterial roads to VicRoads. CityLink is a privately owned and operated tollway, but in June 2004, VicRoads became responsible for managing the CityLink concession contract and the state's assets (such as physical infrastructure including roads, bridges, tunnels and the tolling system operated by CityLink, due to be transferred to the state at the end of the concession period) under that contract, in an effort to improve the integration of CityLink with the rest of the road network. Later in 2004, it re-declared the Tullamarine Freeway to terminate at Mount Alexander Road (sign-posted as Bulla Road) in Strathmore, south of Essendon Airport: CityLink's Western Link officially begins east of this interchange in Strathmore, and ends with its interchange with West Gate Freeway in Port Melbourne. At the same time, VicRoads also re-declared the West Gate Freeway to terminate at Princes Highway East (today Kings Way) in Southbank, and the Monash Freeway to commence in Kooyong: CityLink's Southern Link officially runs between these two points at Southbank and Kooyong.

== Infrastructure ==
=== Existing roads ===
Previously, the city centre was served by three separate freeways:

- The South Eastern Freeway (today the Monash Freeway), which had begun approximately 2 km south-east of the city, and connects Melbourne to the outlying rural Gippsland area;
- The Tullamarine Freeway, which had begun approximately 5 km north-west of the city, and links Melbourne to Melbourne Airport, and also joins the Calder Freeway, which links Melbourne to Bendigo;
- The West Gate Freeway which began in Southbank in the city's south, crossed the Yarra River over the West Gate Bridge and joined to both the Princes Freeway (linking to Geelong) and the Western Ring Road in Laverton North.

CityLink saw the linking of all three of these freeways: extending both the South Eastern and Tullamarine Freeways to join the West Gate Freeway. This also subsumed an existing portion of both the South Eastern and Tullamarine Freeways into the new project: while these portions were widened and upgraded, as part of the CityLink project they were also tolled, attracting criticism from road users.

=== New roads ===
==== Western Link ====
The elevated Western Link extended the existing Tullamarine Freeway, lengthening it to terminate it five kilometres further south at the West Gate Freeway in Port Melbourne, for a total distance of 12.9 km. It included a new major bridge (the Bolte Bridge, named after former Victorian Premier Sir Henry Bolte) over the Yarra River in the Docklands district; a long elevated section over Dudley Flats and Moonee Ponds Creek and a tube-like sound barrier in Flemington where the road passes close to a number of community housing towers. A short distance to the north of the sound tube, a massive sculptural work was placed, called the Melbourne International Gateway, consisting of a giant yellow beam hanging diagonally across the road (nicknamed the "Cheesestick") and a row of smaller red beams alongside the road (the "Zipper", or "rack of lamb"). The existing portion of Tullamarine Freeway between Flemington Road and Bulla Road was subsumed into the Western Link, and was also widened, with a transit lane being added in each direction between Flemington Road and Pascoe Vale Road.

This section of Freeway was originally designated in the 1969 Melbourne Transportation Plan as part of the F14 Freeway Corridor.

==== Southern Link ====
The underground Southern Link directly connects the ends of the West Gate and Monash Freeways into one continuous through-way, for a total distance of 8.0 km. This link comprises the Burnley and Domain Tunnels which pass under the Royal Botanic Gardens and the Yarra River, each tunnel channelling traffic in different directions. The existing portion of South Eastern Freeway between Toorak Road and Batman Avenue was subsumed into the Southern Link, and was also widened.

This section of Freeway was shown in the 1969 Melbourne Transportation Plan as part of the F9 Freeway corridor as a surface-level road.

==== Batman Avenue ====
The Exhibition Street Extension – not a part of the initial project, as it had been promoted as a bypass that would keep cars out of the CBD – consisted of a new four-lane, divided road extending south from the intersection of Flinders and Exhibition Streets in the CBD and spanning the Jolimont rail yards to connect with Batman Avenue near Melbourne Park Tennis Centre. Construction was managed by VicRoads on behalf of the Department of Infrastructure and began in November 1997, for a total distance of 1.9 km completed to coincide with the opening of CityLink. The alignment of Batman Avenue, previously following the northern bank of the Yarra River north of Swan Street to terminate at Swanston Street just north of Princes Bridge, was re-routed to follow this new road; the route 70 tram, previously using this alignment, was also re-routed to run on a dedicated median behind the Melbourne Park complex and re-join the new road before it crossed the rail lines, commencing along this new route from 7 June 1999. It was officially opened as Batman Avenue on 1 November 1999; the former alignment is now a pedestrianised walking track. Costing $30 million, the access road was built as part of CityLink and therefore attracts tolls.

== CityLink–Tulla Widening (2015–2018) ==
=== Project overview ===
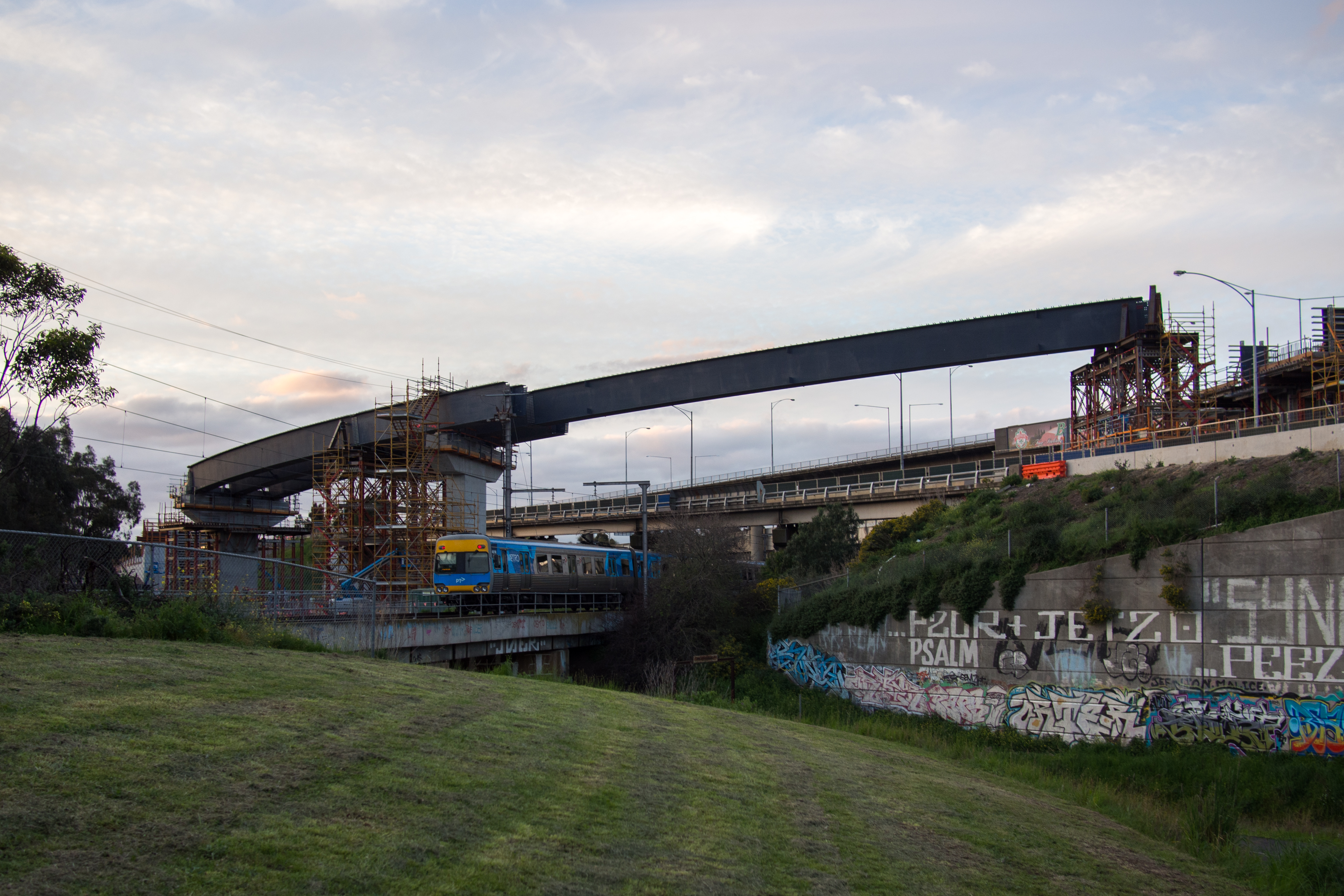
New ramp under construction at Bell Street as part of the CityLink Tulla Widening Project (2016)

The freeway had extensive upgrades between 2015 and 2018, including the addition of lanes as part of the CityLink Tulla Widening Project.

=== Original proposal (2014) ===
The original project was announced in April 2014 by Premier Denis Napthine as an unsolicited proposal by Transurban, with Transurban providing the bulk of the funds for the upgrade. The original design would have involved the widening of the entire Western Link of Citylink up to Bulla Road (Stage 1) and the Tullamarine Freeway from Bulla Road to Melrose Drive (Stage 2). In addition, Transurban's tolling concession was extended by a year, to 2035. Work on the original upgrade was expected to commence construction early–mid 2015, and was expected for completion by early–mid 2018. The original project was designed to complement the former East West Link project which was cancelled after Daniel Andrews won government at the State election in November 2014. This led to the original project being postponed and modified.

=== Final proposal (2015–2018) ===
In August 2015 a new proposal to widen the Citylink and Tullamarine Freeways was put into action by the recently elected Premier Daniel Andrews. The project consists of two stages which would increase the road's daily capacity as well as shorten trips between Melbourne Airport and the CBD during morning peak and afternoon peak times. The following upgrades started in October 2015 (Stage 1) and May 2016 (Stage 2). The entire project is completed by late 2018.

The upgrade involves the construction of a new lane in each direction from Melbourne Airport to Power Street, upgrades to the Bell Street, Flemington Road, English Street and Mickleham Road intersections, and the creation of a dedicated lane between the Calder and Tullamarine Freeways to Bell Street, to reduce weaving. Speed limits will be lowered on parts of the freeway during construction work, and after construction, as a result of lane narrowing. The project will also install an electronic freeway management system, involving CCTV cameras, a variable speed limit, and electronic message signs.

Controversy has arisen due to the proximity of Strathmore Secondary College to the new ramp at Bell Street. The removal of a tree as part of the Flemington Road intersection upgrade also resulted in public protest.

==== Stage 1 (Bulla Road to Power Street) ====
- Lane use management signs to manage which lanes are open
- Variable speed limit signs above all lanes
- Ramp signalling – stop and go traffic lights to improve traffic flow and reduce congestion as traffic enters the freeway from on-ramps
- CCTV cameras – to monitor for incidents, help response times and minimise disruptions
- Travel time information signs so people can plan their journey
- Electronic message signs – to notify road users of planned changes or disruptions
- Automatic incident detection system – to alert road managers of incidents in real time
- Two dedicated lanes inbound to Bell Street from the Tullamarine Freeway and Calder Freeway
- New Bell Street to Pascoe Vale Road
- Improvements to Flemington Road/ Mount Alexander Road Freeway Interchange
- Additional outbound lane between Moreland and Ormond Road
- Ramp widening between Bolte Bridge and West Gate Freeway
- One additional inbound lane between Montague Street and Ingles Street
- One additional inbound lane between Montague Street and Power Street

==== Stage 2 (Melbourne Airport to Bulla Road) ====
- A new structure with dedicated lanes from the Tullamarine Freeway and Mickleham Road to the M80 Ring Road inbound to ease congestion and reduce traffic weaving
- An extra lane entering the Tullamarine Freeway city bound from Mickleham Road
- Reconstruction and widening of the English Street overpass and all ramps to increase capacity into and out of Essendon Fields
- Ramp signals on the city bound entry from Kings Road in Taylors Lakes to the Tulla Calder interchange to regulate the flow of traffic getting onto the Tullamarine Freeway from the Calder Freeway

==== Extra lanes ====
Part of the upgrade is adding more lanes between Melbourne Airport and the West Gate Freeway. Between the Citylink (Western Link) and the West Gate Freeway, one additional lane in each direction will be added consuming the current emergency lanes as well as lower the current speed limit from 100 km/h down to 80 km/h.

== Tolling system ==
There are no toll booths along the entire length of the system, so traffic flow is not impeded.

CityLink uses a DSRC toll system called e-TAG, where an electronic transponder is mounted on the inside of vehicles' windscreens. Gantries constructed over each carriageway record registration plates and detect the e-TAGs, and deduct toll amounts automatically from the account linked electronically to each tag. Where a tag is not detected, the vehicle's registration is recorded using an automatic number plate recognition system and checked against a database. For infrequent use of the system one can buy a Daypass – by phone, online, at any Australia Post outlet or at participating service stations. A Daypass can be bought in advance or afterwards (until midnight three days later). If payment has not been made, the vehicle's registered owner will be sent a late toll invoice in the mail, and if the late toll invoice is then not paid a fine will be issued by Civic Compliance Victoria.

In 2018 CityLink tolling accounts were rebranded as Linkt, as part of parent company Transurban combining their existing retail brands.

The concession period held by Transurban is due to end in 2045, after which the ownership of the road will be transferred to the state. It was originally due to end in January 2035, but was extended as part of a deal with Transurban to build the West Gate Tunnel project.

=== Toll points ===
Multiple toll points are located along the CityLink, with each toll point charging a fixed fee. The CityLink toll points also include the toll point at the Exhibition Street extension (Batman Avenue). The total toll incurred per trip is the smaller of the trip cap or the total price of toll points passed through.

The entry and exit ramps of CityLink (excluding West Gate Freeway) have been constructed in a way that travelling on any section of CityLink will always pass through at least one toll point. The only exception is eastbound travel between Punt Road and Church Street, which does not pass through a toll point and hence does not incur any tolls.

Toll prices as of 1 July 2025
Toll road	Toll section or toll points	Maximum toll price per trip					Toll increase	Toll concessionaire	Expiry of toll concession
Toll road	Toll section or toll points	Cars	Motorcycles	Light Commercial Vehicles	Heavy Commercial Vehicles	Long Heavy Commercial Vehicles	Toll increase	Toll concessionaire	Expiry of toll concession
CityLink	Between Moreland Road and Brunswick Road	$3.23	$1.62	$5.17	$9.70 (Note: Prices shown for heavy commercial vehicles are daytime prices. Nighttime prices are two-thirds of daytime prices (night trip cap is $24.25).)		Quarterly on 1 January, 1 April, 1 July, and 1 October by 1.04597% (Note: These are equivalent to fixed increases of 4.25% annually and are only until 30 June 2029. From 1 July 2029, quarterly increases will be determined by CPI)	Transurban	13 January 2045
CityLink	Between Racecourse Road and Dynon Road	$3.23	$1.62	$5.17	$9.70		Quarterly on 1 January, 1 April, 1 July, and 1 October by 1.04597%	Transurban	13 January 2045
CityLink	Between Footscray Road and West Gate Freeway (Bolte Bridge)	$4.04	$2.02	$6.47	$12.13		Quarterly on 1 January, 1 April, 1 July, and 1 October by 1.04597%	Transurban	13 January 2045
CityLink	Batman Avenue north of Olympic Boulevard (Exhibition Street Extension)	$2.02	$1.01	$3.23	$6.06		Quarterly on 1 January, 1 April, 1 July, and 1 October by 1.04597%	Transurban	13 January 2045
CityLink	Batman Avenue entry south of Olympic Boulevard (eastbound only)	$2.02	$1.01	$3.23	$6.06		Quarterly on 1 January, 1 April, 1 July, and 1 October by 1.04597%	Transurban	13 January 2045
CityLink	Batman Avenue exit south of Olympic Boulevard (westbound only)	$5.25	$2.63	$8.40	$15.76		Quarterly on 1 January, 1 April, 1 July, and 1 October by 1.04597%	Transurban	13 January 2045
CityLink	Domain Tunnel (westbound only)	$7.27	$3.64	$11.63	$21.82		Quarterly on 1 January, 1 April, 1 July, and 1 October by 1.04597%	Transurban	13 January 2045
CityLink	Punt Road exit (westbound only)	$3.23	$1.62	$5.17	$9.70		Quarterly on 1 January, 1 April, 1 July, and 1 October by 1.04597%	Transurban	13 January 2045
CityLink	Burnley Tunnel (eastbound only)	$7.27	$3.64	$11.63	$21.82		Quarterly on 1 January, 1 April, 1 July, and 1 October by 1.04597%	Transurban	13 January 2045
CityLink	Between Church Street and Burnley Street (eastbound only)	$3.20	$1.60	$5.12	$9.60		Quarterly on 1 January, 1 April, 1 July, and 1 October by 1.04597%	Transurban	13 January 2045
CityLink	Between Yarra Boulevard and Toorak Road / Monash Freeway	$3.23	$1.62	$5.17	$9.60		Quarterly on 1 January, 1 April, 1 July, and 1 October by 1.04597%	Transurban	13 January 2045
CityLink	Trip cap	$12.13	$6.06	$19.40	$36.38		Quarterly on 1 January, 1 April, 1 July, and 1 October by 1.04597%	Transurban	13 January 2045
Combined West Gate (Note: The heavy vehicle toll point on the West Gate Freeway covers the freeway and the West Gate Tunnel) & CityLink trip	Combined Heavy Vehicle Trip Cap	N/A			$36.81 (Note: Price shown is the daytime price. Nighttime price is $24.54.)	$55.22 (Note: Price shown is the daytime price. Nighttime price is $36.81.)	Quarterly on 1 January, 1 April, 1 July, and 1 October by 1.04597%	Transurban	13 January 2045

== Exits and Interchanges ==
=== Western Link ===
LGA	Location	km	mi	Exit	Destinations	Notes
Moonee Valley	Essendon Fields–Essendon North–Strathmore tripoint	0.0	0.0	12	Tullamarine Freeway (M2) - Tullamarine, Melbourne Airport	Western Link's northern terminus: continues north-west as Tullamarine Freeway
Moonee Valley	Essendon Fields–Essendon North–Strathmore tripoint	0.0	0.0	12	Bulla Road (Metro Route 37 south, unallocated north) – Essendon, Moonee Ponds	
Merri-bek	Strathmore	2.0	1.2	11	Pascoe Vale Road (Metro Route 35) – Glenroy, Moonee Ponds	Northbound exit and southbound entrance
Merri-bek	Pascoe Vale South	2.6	1.6	11	Bell Street (Metro Route 40) – Coburg, Heidelberg, Springvale	Southbound exit and northbound entrance
Merri-bek	Pascoe Vale South–Brunswick West boundary	4.4	2.7	10	Coonans Road (north) – Pascoe Vale South; Moreland Road (east, west) – Coburg, Essendon	Northbound exit and southbound entrance
Merri-bek	Brunswick West	5.2	3.2	Toll Point		
Merri-bek–Moonee Valley boundary	Brunswick West–Moonee Ponds boundary	6.8	4.2	9	Brunswick Road (Metro Route 38 east) – Brunswick; Ormond Road (Metro Route 38 west) – Moonee Ponds, Maribyrnong	Southbound exit and northbound entrance
Moonee Valley–Melbourne boundary	Travancore–Parkville–Flemington–North Melbourne quadripoint	8.3	5.2	7	Flemington Road (Metro Route 60) – Flemington, City; Boundary Road (south) – North Melbourne	Southbound exit and northbound entrance
Moonee Valley–Melbourne boundary	Flemington–North Melbourne–Kensington tripoint	8.6	5.3	6	Racecourse Road (Metro Route 83) – Parkville, Flemington	Northbound exit and southbound entrance
Melbourne	North Melbourne–Kensington boundary	9.4	5.8	Toll Point		
Melbourne	West Melbourne	10.4	6.5	5	Dynon Road (Metro Route 50) – Footscray, West Melbourne	Southbound exit and northbound entrance
Melbourne	West Melbourne–Docklands boundary	11	6.8	4	West Gate Tunnel (M4) – Geelong, Avalon Airport	Southbound exit and northbound entrance
Melbourne	West Melbourne–Docklands boundary	11	6.8	3	Footscray Road (Metro Route 32) – Footscray, Docklands	
Melbourne	Docklands	11.7	7.3	Toll Point		
Melbourne	Yarra River	11.8– 12.3	7.3– 7.6	Bolte Bridge		
Melbourne	Port Melbourne	12.9	8.0	2A; 2B	Montague Street (Metro Routes 30/55) – South Melbourne, Docklands; Kings Way (Alt National Route 1) – St Kilda, Frankston	Southbound exit only
Melbourne	Port Melbourne	12.9	8.0		Cook Street – Port Melbourne; Salmon Street – Port Melbourne	Northbound entrance to the east only
Melbourne	Port Melbourne	12.9	8.0	1	West Gate Freeway (M1/Tourist Drive 2) – Laverton North, Southbank	Western Link's southern terminus at trumpet interchange; signed as Exits 1E and 1W
1.000 mi = 1.609 km; 1.000 km = 0.621 mi: Incomplete access; Tolled; Route transition

=== Southern Link ===
LGA	Location	km	mi	Exit	Destinations	Notes
Melbourne	Southbank	13	8.1		West Gate Freeway (M1) – Ballarat, Bendigo, Geelong, Melbourne and Avalon Airports	Southern Link's western terminus: continues west as West Gate Freeway
Melbourne	Southbank	13	8.1	W2	Kings Way (Alt National Route 1 south, Metro Route 60 north) – City, -St Kilda, Dandenong	Westbound exit and eastbound entrance only
Melbourne	Southbank	13	8.1	W1	Power Street – City	Westbound and eastbound exit only
Melbourne	Yarra River			Burnley Tunnel eastbound / Domain Tunnel westbound		
Melbourne	Yarra River	14.8	9.2	Toll Point (westbound into Domain Tunnel only)		
Melbourne	Melbourne	14.9	9.3	E1	Batman Avenue – City	Westbound exit from and eastbound entrance to Batman Avenue Extension carriageway
Melbourne	Melbourne	14.9	9.3	E1	Toll Point (westbound exit and eastbound entrance only)	
Melbourne–Yarra boundary	Melbourne–Cremorne boundary	15.1	9.4	E2	Punt Road (Metro Route 29) – Richmond	Westbound exit only, eastbound entrance via Harcourt Parade to Batman Avenue Extension carriageway
Melbourne–Yarra boundary	Melbourne–Cremorne boundary	15.1	9.4	E2	Toll Point (westbound exit only)	
Yarra	Cremorne–Richmond boundary	15.5	9.6		Cremorne Street – Cremorne	Eastbound entrance to Batman Avenue Extension carriageway only
Yarra	Cremorne–Richmond boundary	16.1	10.0		Church Street – Richmond	Eastbound exit from Batman Avenue Extension carriageway only
Yarra	Richmond	16.5	10.3	Toll Point (eastbound on Batman Avenue Extension carriageway only)		
Yarra	Richmond	17.0	10.6	Toll Point (eastbound out of Burnley Tunnel only)		
Yarra	Burnley	17.1	10.6	E3	Burnley Street (north) – Richmond; Barkly Avenue (east) – Burnley	Westbound entrance (via Gibdon Street) and eastbound exits only
Yarra	Burnley	17.1	10.6	E3	Batman Avenue Extension eastbound carriageway merges with Burnley Tunnel eastbound carriageway	
Yarra	Burnley	17.8	11.1	E3	Yarra Boulevard (Tourist Drive 2) – Richmond, Kew	Westbound exit and eastbound entrance
Yarra	Burnley	18.4	11.4	Toll Point		
Stonnington	Kooyong–Malvern boundary	21.0	13.0	E4	Toorak Road (Metro Route 26) – Burwood, Toorak	Single-point urban interchange
Stonnington	Kooyong–Malvern boundary	21.0	13.0	E4	Monash Freeway (M1) – Chadstone, Dandenong, Narre Warren, Pakenham	Southern Link's eastern terminus, continues southeast as Monash Freeway
1.000 mi = 1.609 km; 1.000 km = 0.621 mi: Incomplete access; Tolled; Route transition

=== Batman Avenue ===
Batman Avenue is entirely contained within the City of Melbourne local government area.

Location	km	mi	Destinations	Notes
Melbourne CBD	0.0	0.0	Exhibition Street – City, Carlton	Western terminus of road: continues north as Exhibition Street
Melbourne CBD	0.0	0.0	Flinders Street (Metro Route 30) – Docklands, Richmond	
Melbourne CBD	0.1	0.062	Hurstbridge, Mernda, Lilydale, Belgrave, Glen Waverley, Sandringham, Frankston, Pakenham and Cranbourne railway lines	
Melbourne CBD	0.4	0.25	Tennis Centre Access Road	Access to Melbourne Park only
Melbourne CBD	0.6	0.37	Toll Point	
Melbourne CBD	1.0	0.62	Olympic Boulevard (Metro Route 20) – Southbank, Burnley	No right turn northbound into Olympic Boulevard eastbound
Melbourne CBD	1.9	1.2	Toll Point (at both westbound entrance and eastbound exit)	
Melbourne CBD	1.9	1.2	CityLink (M1) – Kooyong, Chadstone, Narre Warren	Eastern terminus of road: continues southeast as Southern Link's Batman Avenue Extension carriageway
1.000 mi = 1.609 km; 1.000 km = 0.621 mi: Incomplete access; Tolled; Route transition

== Controversies ==
As part of the development of CityLink, portions of existing roads were subsumed into the CityLink project: while they too were upgraded and expanded, tolling points were also added. Toll charges now apply to the former Monash Freeway between Toorak Road and Punt Road, and the former Tullamarine Freeway south of Bulla Road. Previously public roads, they did not incur tolls to use before.

Some nearby roads were altered to restrict rat runs to stop people using neighbourhood back streets as short cuts to avoid the toll. Some people have viewed this as local councils 'forcing' people to use CityLink.

CityLink account holders can, if they make multiple trips in a day, pay more to use the road than a casual user. A 24-hour Pass, for example, is charged at a flat rate, but an account holder pays per trip. Account holders who make multiple trips in a single day may pay more than a pass customer would. However, CityLink recognises this and account customers can remove their e-TAG device and buy a pass for the day: just like casual customers. However, there is a limit to the number of passes that can be bought each 12 months. This limit applies to account holders and casual users.

The contract between the government and CityLink's owner Transurban has protections for both parties. One of these is the ability for Transurban to make a claim against the state government if the state government does something that reduces the number of cars that could use CityLink. In 2001 Transurban commenced legal proceedings against the State of Victoria over the construction of Wurundjeri Way through the Docklands. It was alleged that this 'free' road was competing with CityLink and causing it to earn less revenue. This can potentially also be applied if the capacity of other roads or rail routes parallel to CityLink are expanded, however the contract specifically excludes compensation if the metropolitan rail network is extended to Melbourne Airport.

CityLink received negative media coverage when it was wrongly claimed that CityLink account holders' credit card details were stored on Transurban's public webserver and that someone had broken into the system and stolen tens of thousands of customers details. Customer details were stolen, not by an intruder via the web, but by a former employee who had misused access to the secure IT systems.

The two CityLink tunnels have regularly featured as discussion points on talkback radio, firstly for air quality. In the early days of operation, the air quality in the tunnels appeared smoggy. CityLink worked a way around the problem by adjusting the venting system which improved quality and dispersed exhaust fumes more effectively. The second issue was regarding the use of massive quantities of fresh drinking water pumped into the system to stabilise the tunnel environs. After some time, CityLink sought and obtained approval from the State Government to build a water recycling plant which meant they could rely primarily on recycled, and not drinking, water.

== See also ==
- Freeways in Australia
- Freeways in Melbourne
- Road transport in Victoria
