= Yarra Scenic Drive =

Road in Victoria, Australia

Yarra Scenic Drive Victoria
- Coordinates: 37.867186°S 144.912953°E (Southwest end); 37.736949°S 145.222493°E (Northeast end)

General information
- Type: Road
- Length: 60.1 km (37 mi)
- Opened: 1989
- Route number(s): Tourist Drive 2 (1989–present)
- Former route number: Metro Route 2 (1965–1989) (Docklands–Eaglemont)

Major junctions
- Southwest end: Battery Road; Williamstown, Melbourne
- Douglas Parade; West Gate Freeway; Wurundjeri Way; City Road; Chandler Highway; Williamsons Road
- Northeast end: Ringwood–Warrandyte Road; Warrandyte, Melbourne

Location(s)
- Major suburbs: Newport, Yarraville, Melbourne, Southbank, South Yarra, Burnley, Kew, Ivanhoe, Bulleen, Templestowe

Yarra Scenic Drive is a tourist drive following the Yarra River, in Victoria, Australia. The route traverses approximately 60 km from Williamstown – where the Yarra empties into Port Phillip Bay – to Warrandyte – Melbourne's first goldfield site on the banks of the Yarra.

== Route ==
=== Warrandyte to Bulleen ===
Through these outer north-eastern suburbs, the route winds near to the Yarra River, but rarely can the driver see the river itself. The roads do, however, pass by a number of Yarraside parks, including Pound Bend, Westerfolds Park, Finns Reserve, Birrarung Park and Banksia Park, which are all well-liked serene picnic locations with a view of the outer-suburban Yarra River, where it is still safe to swim and canoe.

=== Heidelberg to Alphington ===
There is little in the way of a Yarra view along this section of the drive. The best Yarra vantage point is found alongside the Boulevarde, but there are many stores and some industry through these middle-northern suburbs.

=== Yarra Boulevard, Kew ===
A winding but road on the edge of a hill which provides a marvellous view of both the Yarra and the inner suburbs. It also runs alongside several golf courses.

=== Burnley to Southbank ===
For most of this section, the road runs directly alongside the Yarra River after it widens past Dights Falls, with a clean view of the bridges and surroundings. Alexandra Avenue also provides access to the Royal Botanic Gardens and Birrarung Marr. Alexandra Avenue, however, is an important thoroughfare in inner-eastern Melbourne, and so traffic can often be unpleasant.

=== City ===
Route 2 briefly takes in the CBD, driving directly past Crown Casino and the Melbourne Aquarium.

=== West Gate Bridge ===
The famous West Gate Bridge spans the Yarra at its widest, and gives a panoramic view of the city, the docks, the industrial western suburbs, and Port Phillip Bay. Traffic is chaotic during peak hour.

=== Yarraville to Williamstown ===
This is a drive along the inner-western beachfront to the end of the mini-peninsula at Williamstown, finishing the route alongside a scenery of blue skies, yellow sand and marinas - a far cry from the leafy green beginnings of Warrandyte. This section coincides with the newer Bay West Trail, signed as Tourist Route 11.

== History ==
Tourist Drive 2 route marker

The drive was originally signed as Metropolitan Route 2 in 1965, and was signed accordingly with the standard blue and white curved shield signs. When the route was extended from Ivanhoe East to Warrandyte, it was re-signed using the brown five-sided shield in 1989, usually shown in the centre of a small green and white sign bearing the words Yarra Scenic Drive.

== Major intersections ==
LGA	Location	km	mi	Destinations	Notes
Hobsons Bay	Williamstown	0.0	0.0	Battery Road – Williamstown	Southwestern terminus of tourist route, Battery Road continues west
Hobsons Bay	Williamstown	1.4	0.87	Ferguson Street, to Kororoit Creek Road (Metro Route 35) – Altona North, Laverton North	Northern end of Nelson Place, southern end of The Strand
Hobsons Bay	Newport	3.2	2.0	The Strand – Newport	Eastern end of North Road, road continues north as The Strand
Hobsons Bay	Newport	3.5	2.2	North Road (west) – Newport; Douglas Parade (Metro Route 35 south) – Williamstown	Southern terminus of concurrency with Metro Route 35
Hobsons Bay	Spotswood	5.5	3.4	West Gate Freeway (M1) – Laverton North, Geelong	Eastbound exit only, westbound entrance via Simcock Avenue; Northern end of Douglas Parade, southern end of Hyde Street
Hobsons Bay–Maribyrnong border	Spotswood–Yarraville border	6.1	3.8	Francis Street (Metro Route 35 east) – Footscray, Pascoe Vale; Hyde Street (north) – Footscray	Northern terminus of concurrency with Metro Route 35
Maribyrnong	Yarraville	6.8	4.2	Werribee railway line	
Maribyrnong	Yarraville	7.3	4.5	Williamstown Road (Metro Route 37 north) – Footscray, Essendon; Francis Street (west) – Brooklyn	Northern terminus of concurrency with Metro Route 37
Maribyrnong–Hobsons Bay border	Yarraville–Spotswood border	7.9	4.9	Melbourne Road (Metro Route 37 south) – Newport, Williamstown; West Gate Freeway (M1 west) – Laverton North	Southern terminus of concurrency with Metro Route 35; Western terminus of concurrency with route M1
Hobsons Bay	Spotswood	8.4	5.2	Werribee railway line	
Yarra River		8.5– 11.0	5.3– 6.8	West Gate Bridge	
Melbourne	Port Melbourne	11.5	7.1	Todd Road/Cook Street – Fishermans Bend	Westbound exit part of local lanes containing exit to Citylink
Melbourne	Port Melbourne	12.6	7.8	CityLink (M2) – Tullamarine, Melbourne Airport	Trumpet interchange with local-express lanes; westbound exit on local lanes
Melbourne	Docklands	14.1	8.8	West Gate Freeway (M1 east) – Kooyong, Narre Warren, Pakenham; Montague Street (Metro Route 30 south) – South Melbourne	Eastern terminus of concurrency with route M1; Western terminus of concurrency with Metro Routes 30/55
Melbourne	Docklands	14.2	8.8	Lorimer Street (west) – Fishermans Bend; Convention Centre Place (east) – Jeff's Shed	Northern end of Montague Street, southern end of Wurundjeri Way
Yarra River		14.3	8.9	Charles Grimes Bridge	
Melbourne	Docklands	14.4	8.9	Harbour Esplanade – Docklands	Northbound exit only
Melbourne	Docklands	14.8	9.2	Wurundjeri Way (Metro Route 55 north) – Brunswick, Coburg	Eastern terminus of concurrency with Metro Route 55; Western end of Flinders Street
Melbourne	Docklands–Melbourne CBD border	15.1	9.4	Spencer Street (Metro Route 50 north) – North Melbourne; Flinders Street (Metro Route 30 east) – Richmond, Camberwell	Eastern terminus of concurrency with Metro Route 30; Northern terminus of concurrency with Metro Route 50
Yarra River		15.3	9.5	Spencer Street Bridge	
Melbourne	Southbank	15.9	9.9	Clarendon Street (south) – South Melbourne; City Road (Metro Route 20 west) – Port Melbourne	Eastern terminus of Metro Route 50; Western terminus of concurrency with Metro Route 20
Melbourne	Southbank	16.1	10.0	Queensbridge Street – City	
Melbourne	Southbank	16.5	10.3	Power Street, to West Gate Freeway (M1) – Laverton North, Werribee	
Melbourne	Melbourne	17.9	11.1	Olympic Boulevard (Metro Route 20) – Richmond, Camberwell	No right turn northbound into Olympic Boulevard; Eastern terminus of concurrency with Metro Route 20
Stonnington	South Yarra	20.0	12.4	Punt Road (Metro Route 29) – Clifton Hill, St Kilda, Elwood	
Stonnington	South Yarra	20.6	12.8	Sandringham, Frankston and Pakenham railway lines	
Stonnington	South Yarra–Toorak border	21.8	13.5	Williams Road (Metro Route 25 south) – Prahran, Elsternwick, Brighton	Southern terminus of concurrency with Metro Route 25
Stonnington	South Yarra–Toorak border	22.2	13.8	Alexandra Avenue (west) – South Yarra	Northern end of Williams Road
Stonnington	Toorak	23.0	14.3	Grange Road (Metro Route 21 south) – Toorak; St Georges Road (east) – Toorak	Eastern terminus of Metro Route 25; Eastern end of Alexandra Avenue; Southern terminus of concurrency with Metro Route 21
Yarra River		23.1	14.4	MacRobertson Bridge	
Yarra	Burnley	23.2	14.4	Twickenham Crescent (west) – Burnley; Loyola Grove (Metro Route 21 north) – Kew, Reservoir	Northern terminus of concurrency with Metro Route 21; Western end of Yarra Boulevard
Yarra	Burnley	23.3	14.5	CityLink (M1) – Narre Warren, Pakenham	Eastbound entrance and westbound exit only
Yarra	Burnley	24.0	14.9	Glen Waverley railway line	
Yarra	Burnley	25.8	16.0	Yarra Boulevard Link, to Swan Street (Metro Routes 20/21) – Richmond, Kew, Camberwell	
Yarra	Burnley	26.2	16.3	Lilydale and Belgrave railway lines	
Yarra	Richmond	26.9	16.7	Bridge Road (Metro Route 30 west) – City, Port Melbourne	Western terminus of concurrency with Metro Route 30
Yarra River		27.0	16.8	Hawthorn Bridge	
Boroondara	Hawthorn	27.1	16.8	Burwood Road (Metro Route 30 east) – Camberwell	Eastern terminus of concurrency with Metro Route 30; Southern terminus of concurrency with Metro Route 36; Eastern end of Bridge Road, southern end of Church Street
Boroondara	Hawthorn–Kew border	28.0	17.4	Barkers Road (Metro Route 32) – Docklands, Forest Hill, Montrose	Southern end of Church Street, northern end of High Street
Boroondara	Kew	28.8	17.9	High Street (Metro Routes 34/36 northeast) – Box Hill, Ringwood, Boronia; Princess Street (Metro Route 21 north) – Reservoir; Denmark Street (Metro Route 21 south) – Burnley	Northern terminus of concurrency with Metro Route 36; Eastern terminus of concurrency with Metro Route 34; Eastern end of Studley Park Road
Boroondara	Kew	30.5	19.0	Studley Park Road (Metro Route 34) – Carlton	Western terminus of concurrency with Metro Route 34; Northern end of Walmer Street
Boroondara	Kew	30.8	19.1	Walmer Street (south) – Kew; McEvoy Street (east) – Kew	Southern end of Yarra Boulevard
Boroondara	Kew	37.4	23.2	Chandler Highway (Metro Route 21 south) – Burnley	Southern terminus of concurrency with Metro Route 21; Northern end of Yarra Boulevard
Yarra River		37.5	23.3	Chandler Bridge	
Yarra–Darebin border	Alphington	38.1	23.7	Grange Road (Metro Route 21 north) – Reservoir; Heidelberg Road (Metro Route 46 west) – Carlton	Southern terminus of concurrency with Metro Route 21; Western terminus of concurrency with Metro Route 46
Banyule	Ivanhoe	40.7	25.3	Heidelberg Road (Metro Route 46 east) – Greensborough, Diamond Creek	Eastern terminus of concurrency with Metro Route 46; Western end of The Boulevard
Banyule	Ivanhoe East	42.5	26.4	Burke Road (Metro Route 17 south) – Camberwell, Caulfield East	Southern terminus of concurrency with Metro Route 17; Eastern end of The Boulevard
Banyule	Ivanhoe East–Eaglemont border	43.5	27.0	Lower Heidelberg Road (Metro Route 44 southwest) – Carlton; Maltravers Road (west) – Eaglemont	Northern terminus of Metro Route 17; Southern terminus of concurrency with Metro Route 44
Banyule	Eaglemont–Heidelberg border	44.8	27.8	Lower Heidelberg Road (Metro Route 44 north) – Eltham, Kangaroo Ground; Banksia Street (Metro Route 40 west) – Preston, Coburg	Northern terminus of concurrency with Metro Route 44; Western terminus of concurrency with Metro Route 40
Yarra River		45.5	28.3	Banksia Street Bridge	
Manningham	Bulleen	45.9	28.5	Manningham Road (Metro Route 40 east) – Doncaster, Glen Waverley, Edithvale	Eastern terminus of concurrency with Metro Route 40; Western end of Bridge Street
Manningham	Bulleen	46.1	28.6	Bulleen Road (Metro Route 52 south) – Balwyn North	Western terminus of concurrency with Metro Route 52; Eastern end of Bridge Street, western end of Templestowe Road
Manningham	Templestowe Lower	48.9	30.4	Thompsons Road (Metro Route 42 south) – Balwyn North; Foote Street (Metro Routes 42/52 east) – Warrandyte, Donvale	Eastern terminus of concurrency with Metro Route 52; Eastern end of Templestowe Road, southern end of Union Street
Manningham	Templestowe	51.3	31.9	Fitzsimons Lane (B37 north) – Eltham; Williamsons Road (B37/Metro Route 42 south) – Balwyn North, Doncaster, Huntingdale	Western terminus of concurrency with Metro Route 42
Manningham	Templestowe–Doncaster East border	54.5	33.9	Blackburn Road – Blackburn, Burwood East, Notting Hill	
Manningham	Doncaster East	55.2	34.3	Andersons Creek Road (Metro Route 13) – Doncaster East	
Manningham	Warrandyte	60.1	37.3	Kangaroo Ground–Warrandyte Road (Metro Route 9 north) – Kangaroo Ground, Wattle Glen; Ringwood–Warrandyte Road (Metro Routes 9/42 east) – Ringwood	Northeastern terminus of tourist route Eastern terminus of concurrency with Metro Route 42
1.000 mi = 1.609 km; 1.000 km = 0.621 mi: Concurrency terminus; Incomplete access; Route transition
