= List of places on the Victorian Heritage Register in the City of Yarra =

This is a list of places on the Victorian Heritage Register in the City of Yarra in Melbourne, Victoria, Australia. The Victorian Heritage Register is maintained by the Heritage Council of Victoria.

As of September 2026, the Victorian Heritage Register listed the following 145 state-registered places within the City of Yarra:

Place name	Place #	Location	Suburb or Town	Co-ordinates	Built	State registered	Photo
Abbotsford Convent			Abbotsford				
Brunswick Street Oval							
Bryant and May Factory							
Cairo Flats							
Chandler Highway							
Church Street Bridge							
Clifton Hill Primary School			Clifton Hill				
Clifton Hill railway station			Clifton Hill				
Clifton Hill Shot Tower			Clifton Hill				
Collingwood Town Hall			Collingwood				
Devonshire Arms Hotel			Fitzroy				
Dights Falls							
Fairfield Infectious Diseases Hospital			Fairfield				
Fitzroy Town Hall			Fitzroy				
Hawthorn Bridge			Hawthorn				
Keith Haring Mural							
Nylex Clock							
Richmond Power Station			Richmond				
Skipping Girl Sign							
St Mark's Anglican Church, Fitzroy			Fitzroy				
University of Melbourne, Burnley campus			Burnley				
Victoria Bridge							
Victoria Park							
Yan Yean Water Supply System (Note: Also listed on the VHR in the local government areas of Whittlesea, Darebin, and the Shire of Mitchell.)	H2333	various		37°19′50″S 145°05′22″E	1853–57	12 December 2013	
Yarra Bend Park
Yarra Primary School
