= Heidelberg Road =

Road in Melbourne, Victoria

Heidelberg Road Victoria
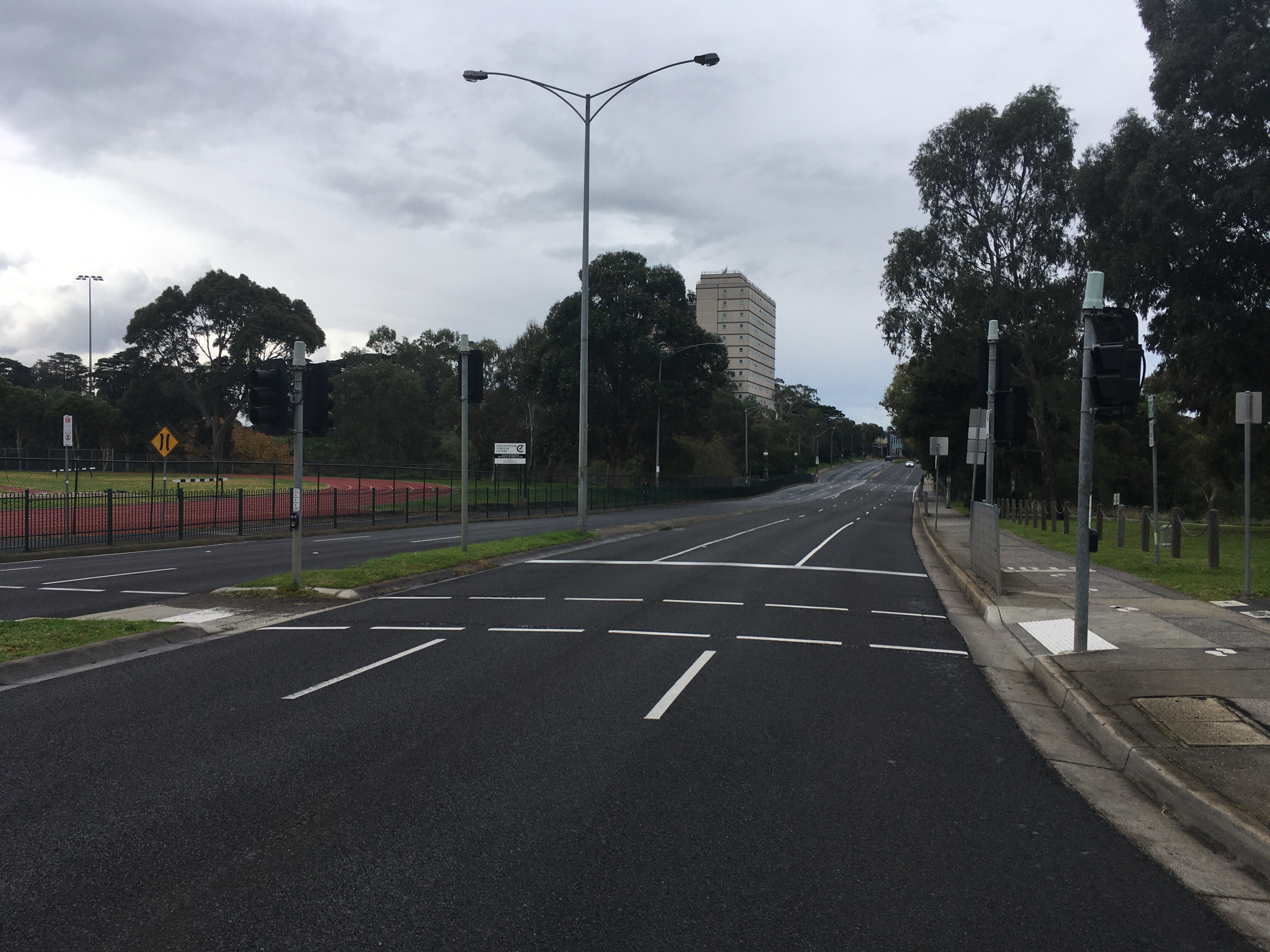

- Coordinates: 37.788102°S 144.992083°E (Southwest end); 37.772702°S 145.040697°E (Northeast end)

General information
- Type: Road
- Length: 4.9 km (3.0 mi)
- Gazetted: March 1914
- Route number(s): Metro Route 46 (1965–present); Entire route
- Former route number: Metro Route 2 (1965–1989) (Alphington–Ivanhoe)
- Tourist routes: Tourist Route 2 (1989–present) (Alphington–Ivanhoe)

Major junctions
- Southwest end: Queens Parade; Clifton Hill, Melbourne
- Hoddle Street; Westgarth Street; Chandler Highway
- Northeast end: Lower Heidelberg Road; Upper Heidelberg Road Ivanhoe, Melbourne

Location(s)
- Major suburbs: Clifton Hill, Fairfield, Alphington, Ivanhoe

Heidelberg Road is a major arterial road through the north-eastern suburbs of Melbourne. It was the first road in Victoria outside the township of Melbourne. Heidelberg Road was the main route for people travelling to Heidelberg, from the mid to late 1800s.

== Route ==
Heidelberg Road commences at the intersection with Queens Parade in Clifton Hill and heads in a northeasterly direction as a four-lane, dual-carriageway road, crossing Hoddle Street via an overpass shortly afterwards, then Merri Creek a short distance later. The road narrows to a single carriageway road as it continues through Alphington and meeting Chandler Highway, before eventually terminating at the intersection with Lower Heidelberg Road and Upper Heidelberg Road in Ivanhoe.

== History ==
Access was required to the Heidelberg area by wealthy settlers in the 1830s. Heidelberg Road started as a track at Smith Street, Melbourne, crossing two creeks, Merri Creek and Darebin Creek.

The road's maintenance was undertaken by the Heidelberg Road Trust, formed in 1841, by the election of local landowners. The Trust was the first local government body in Victoria. (Note: The part of the Colony of New South Wales which later became the Colony of Victoria.) Earlier, Heidelberg residents had contributed to the funding of the first bridge over Darebin Creek. The road was completed in 1842, and is believed to have followed an Aboriginal traditional route. The Trust was the first road trust established in the Colony of New South Wales.

In 1847 Victoria's first toll gate was established, near Merri Creek, to fund the road's maintenance. This allowed the road to be surfaced with macadam, the first such road in Victoria, and the road itself became a tourist attraction. This work was completed in 1848, and the road was known as the "Great Heidelberg Road".

The Heidelberg Road Trust was replaced by the Heidelberg Road Board, in 1861, which was then also responsible for other roads in the area.

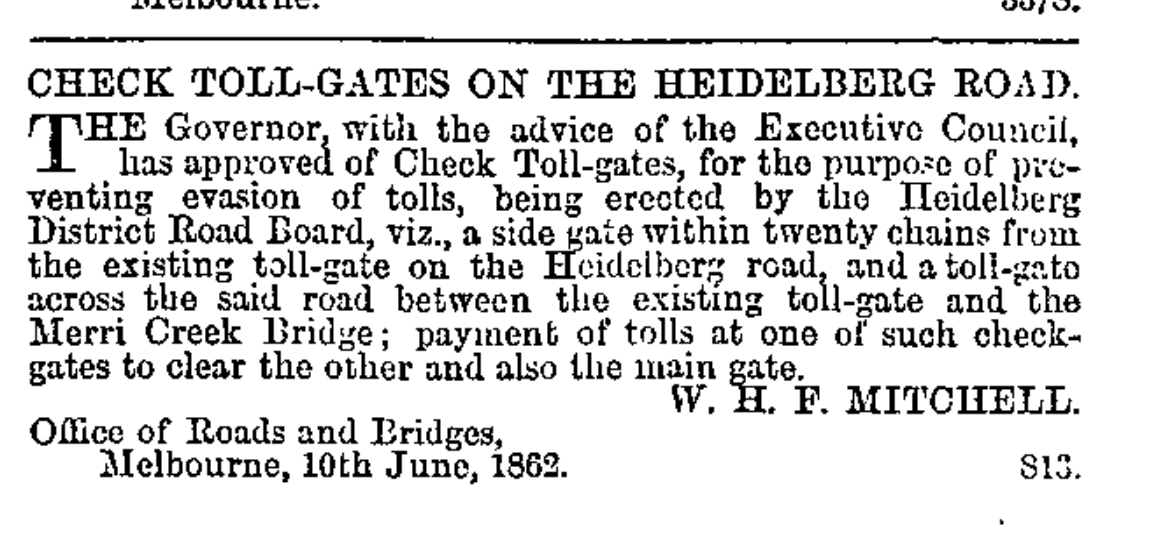
Check toll gates on Heidelberg Rod

The causeway across Merri Creek was replaced by Heidelberg Bridge in 1852, which was washed away ten years later. Its replacement was completed by 1868.

Within Victoria, the passing of the Country Roads Act 1912 through the Parliament of Victoria provided for the establishment of the Country Roads Board (later VicRoads) and their ability to declare Main Roads, taking responsibility for the management, construction and care of the state's major roads from local municipalities. Main Heidelberg-Eltham Road was declared a Main Road from Heidelberg Bridge over Merri Creek through Alphington to the intersection of Upper Heidelberg and Lower Heidelberg Roads in Ivanhoe (the declaration continues east along Lower Heidelberg Road through Heidelberg and Rosanna to Eltham).

Heidelberg Road was an important early development corridor leading out of Melbourne. A mixture of well developed areas and sparsely developed areas along the road had occurred by 1914. The sparsely developed areas were mostly filled in by 1931, and by 1945 light commercial shops and warehousing was in place with some smaller sites being consolidated. The present day (Note: As at 2019 per source.) nature of development along the road, light industrial and commercial, had been established by 1956.

The elimination of the railway crossing at the Clifton Hill railway gates, where Heidelberg Road crossed the Hurstbridge and Whittlesea railway lines and then Hoddle Street, was considered in the 1927 "Report of The Parliamentary Standing Committee on Railways, on proposed expenditure on a vehicular subway at Heidelberg Road, Clifton Hill", The committee, chaired by A. E. Chandler, recommended an underpass for Heidelberg Road.

“The Committee here is again inclined to agree with the objection of the municipalities that having regards to the contour of the surrounding country, the proximity of Coulson’s Reserve and Mayor’s Park, and the work which has been done in beautifying Heidelberg-road by means of reserves and gardens, a subway, if it can be obtained at a reasonable cost, is to be preferred to an overhead road bridge at this point.”

Despite the recommendation, the crossing was replaced by an overpass, between February 1956 and May 1957.

The passing of the Country Roads Act 1958 updated the definition of Main Roads. A western extension to the existing declaration of Heidelberg Road, from its original terminus at the intersection with Queens Parade in Clifton Hill westwards along Queens Parade and Alexandra Parade to the intersection with Nicholson Street in Fitzroy, was declared a Main Road on 7 September 1960 (with roads still sign-posted as its constituent parts); this was later truncated to the intersection of Queens Parade and Alexandra Parade upon the declaration of Eastern Highway in October 1977.

Heidelberg Road was signed as Metropolitan Route 46 in 1965. It shared a concurrency with Metropolitan Route 2, from Chandler Highway in Alphington to The Boulevard in southern Ivanhoe, also signed in 1965; this was replaced by Tourist Route 2 in 1989.

The passing of the Road Management Act 2004 granted the responsibility of overall management and development of Victoria's major arterial roads to VicRoads: in 2004, VicRoads re-declared the road as Heidelberg Road (Arterial #5812), beginning at the intersection with Queens Parade and ending at Merri Creek through Clifton Hill (the declaration continues west along Queens Parade to Alexandra Parade in Fitzroy), and as Main Heidelberg-Eltham Road (Arterial #5762) from Merri Creek in Clifton Hill and the intersection of Upper Heidelberg and Lower Heidelberg Roads in Ivanhoe (the declaration continues east along Lower Heidelberg Road to Banksia Street in Eaglemont). The road is still presently known (and signposted) as Heidelberg Road along its entire length.

== Aboriginal impact ==
Heidelberg Road was an area used by local Aboriginal people for encampments.

In 1840, the Mounted Police executed a military ambush of 500 Aboriginal men who had gathered on the road, arresting many and imprisoning them.

== Major intersections ==
LGA	Location	km	mi	Destinations	Notes
Yarra	Clifton Hill–Fitzroy North boundary	0.0	0.0	Queens Parade (Metro Route 46 southwest, unallocated northeast) – Carlton, Northcote, Reservoir	Western terminus of road, Metro Route 46 continues southwest along Queens Parade
Yarra	Clifton Hill–Fitzroy North boundary	0.3	0.19	Hoddle Street (Metro Route 29) – Northcote, Reservoir, Richmond, St Kilda	Westbound exit to Hoddle Street southbound only, eastbound and westbound entry from Hoddle Street northbound only
Yarra	Clifton Hill	0.4	0.25	Hurstbridge and Mernda railway lines	
Merri Creek		1.1	0.68	Heidelberg Bridge	
Yarra–Darebin boundary	Northcote–Fairfield boundary	2.1	1.3	Westgarth Street (Metro Route 38) – Maribyrnong, Fitzroy North	
Yarra–Darebin boundary	Alphington	3.0	1.9	Grange Road (Metro Route 21 north) – Preston, Reservoir; Chandler Highway (Metro Route 21/Tourist Route 2 south) – Kew, Burnley	Western terminus of concurrency with Tourist Route 2
Darebin Creek		4.1	2.5	Darebin Creek Bridge	
Banyule	Ivanhoe	4.3	2.7	The Boulevard (Tourist Route 2) – Ivanhoe East	Eastern terminus of concurrency with Tourist Route 2
Banyule	Ivanhoe	4.9	3.0	Upper Heidelberg Road (Metro Route 46) – Rosanna, Greensborough, Diamond Creek	Metro Route 46 continues north along Upper Heidelberg Road
Banyule	Ivanhoe	4.9	3.0	Lower Heidelberg Road (Metro Route 44) – Heidelberg, Eltham, Kangaroo Ground	Eastern terminus of road, western terminus of Metro Route 44
1.000 mi = 1.609 km; 1.000 km = 0.621 mi: Concurrency terminus; Incomplete access; Route transition
