= St Bartholomew's Church, Burnley =

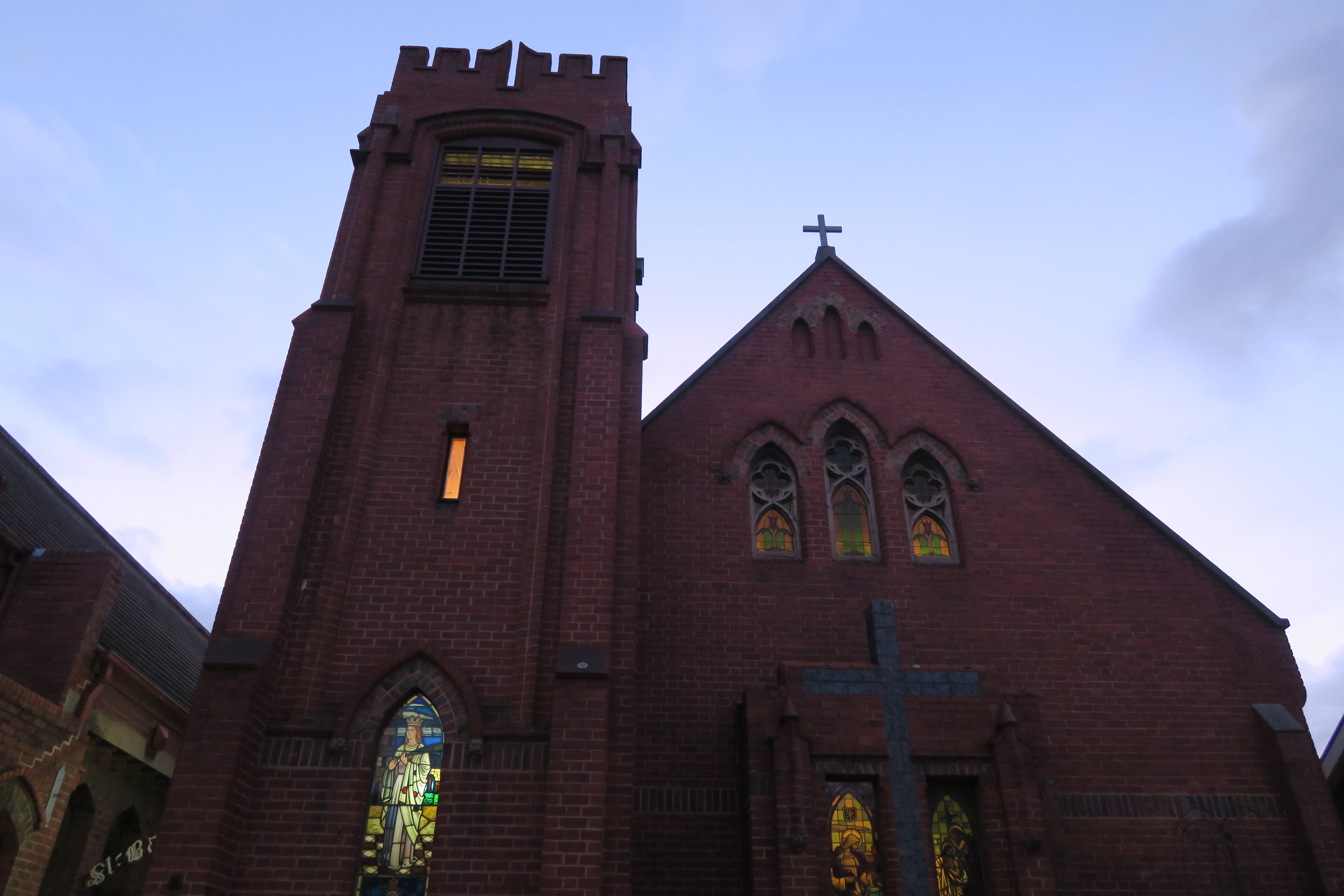
- St Bartholomew's on a winter's evening
- St Bartholomew's Church, Burnley
- 37°49′24″S 145°00′27″E
- Location: 290 Burnley Street, Richmond, Melbourne, Victoria, Australia
- Denomination: Anglican
- Website: stbartsburnley.org.au

Administration
- Division: Anglican Diocese of Melbourne

Clergy
- Vicar: Matthew Healy

St Bartholomew's Church, Burnley, is the Anglican parish church of the small suburb of Burnley, historically considered part of Richmond, in inner-suburban Melbourne, Victoria, Australia. Known colloquially as "St Bart's", the parish is in the Anglican Diocese of Melbourne and is well known as belonging to the Anglo-Catholic or High Church tradition. Its congregation is active in various ministries around Richmond and beyond. It has an opportunity shop which operates out of the parish hall.

== Location ==
The church and adjacent hall complex are located at 290 Burnley Street, Richmond, on the western side of Burnley Street at the corner of Boyd Street, halfway between Swan Street and Bridge Road.

Although St Bartholomew's is the Anglican parish church of Burnley, the parish land and buildings are located in Richmond, as Burnley Street is the suburban boundary: Burnley to the east and Richmond to the west.

== Early history ==
In 1870, land was granted to the Anglican Church by the Victorian government. In 1883, as settlement in the area had developed fully, a committee was formed to raise funds for the purpose of constructing a new church in Burnley.

The decision to name the new church after St Bartholomew is thought to have been a result of two factors: one of the predominant local industries in Burnley in the 1880s was tanning (St Bartholomew is the patron saint of tanners) and the meeting which led to the erection of the first wooden church building took place in August; St Bartholomew's feast day is 24 August.

== Original buildings ==
=== First church building ===
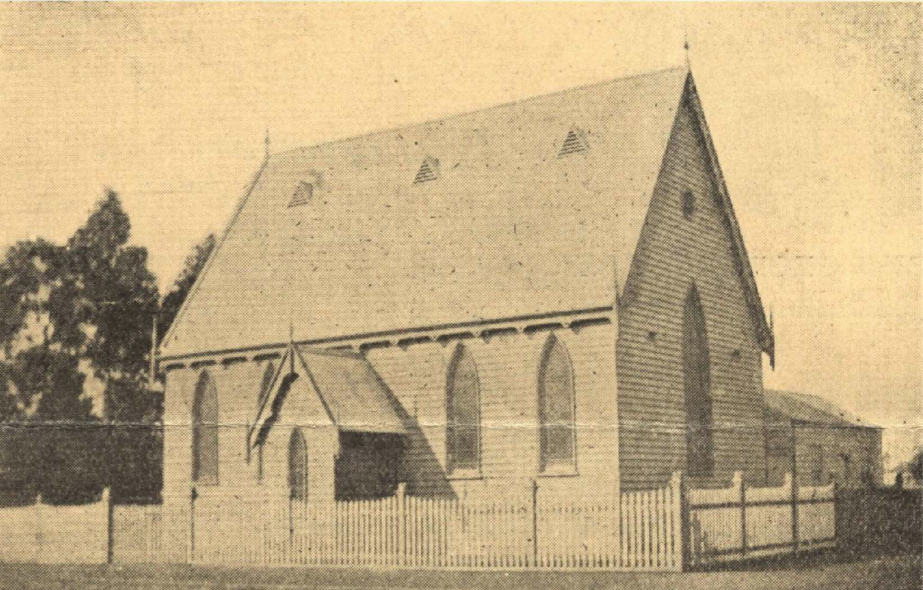
The original wooden St Bartholomew's Church building in 1885. The original parish land was on the south-eastern corner of Swan Street and Burnley Street

The first church building, a Gothic style wooden hall, was formally opened on 22 January 1885 at the south-eastern corner of Swan Street and Burnley Street, adjacent to the present Burnley railway station. This building served both as a Sunday school hall and place of worship, and was served initially by clergy from neighbouring St Stephen's Church, Richmond.

Rapid growth in the parish meant that pressure mounted for St Bartholomew's to be made a separate parish. This was achieved in 1890, when the Parish of Burnley was constituted and the Reverend Henry James Powell was inducted as the first vicar of Burnley. A measure of Powell's success in his new role can be seen in building extensions: within twelve months it was necessary to double the size of the church.

The collapse of the economic boom in Melbourne, and the long economic depression throughout the 1890s, meant that plans to build a brick church building did not eventuate until 1908.

=== Second church building ===
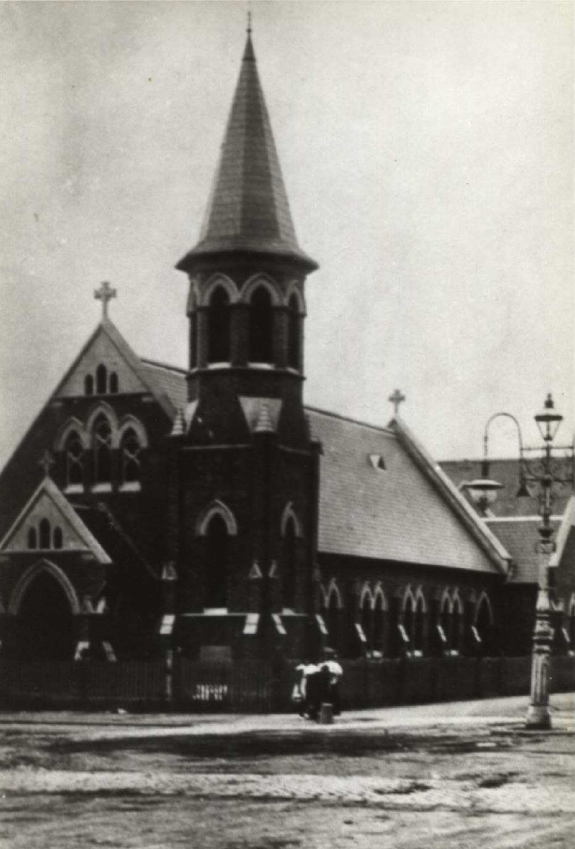
St Bartholomew's Church, Burnley in 1910. Designed by the Melbourne architectural firm of Thomas Watts and Sons, the building was demolished in 1925 and many materials reused in the new church building on the relocated parish land.

The new brick church building was designed by the well-known Melbourne architectural firm of Thomas Watts and Sons. A founder of the Victorian Institute of Architecture, Thomas Watts had been responsible for some lavish Victorian era mansions in Melbourne's inner suburbs and was soon to direct the relocation of St James' Old Cathedral to its present site in West Melbourne. Watts' design for the new St Bartholomew's Church, in the Arts and Crafts movement style, included an entrance porch facing Swan Street and a tower with an octagonal spire at the north-west corner. The foundation stone was laid in July 1910 and the new church building was dedicated and opened December the same year. The original wooden building remained in use as the parish hall.

== Present church building and hall complex ==
The parish land was relocated in 1925 to the present site on the north-western corner of Burnley and Boyd Streets.

Various factors contributed to this decision: most notably the 1910 building had been weakened by ground vibrations generated by being situated between the busy tramway in Swan Street and the railway line directly behind the original property. Further difficulties were raised by the heavy industry then still in the neighbourhood. The limitation on the size of the site made expansion of the buildings to accommodate additional activities, such as a parish kindergarten, impossible. By the 1920s the original location was no longer central to the majority of worshippers, an issue raised as early as 1915, and a quieter location was also considered desirable.

The relocation was accomplished by the purchase and demolition of several workers' cottages at the corner of Burnley and Boyd Streets.

The present St Bartholomew's Church, Burnley in the late 1920s. The parish land was relocated to the present site, at the corner of Burnley and Boyd Streets, in 1925 and the new church and hall buildings opened in 1926.

Gawler & Drummond, prolific and prominent Melbourne architects whose later work was to include the Grainger Museum at the University of Melbourne, prepared the plans for a new brick church building and adjacent hall complex; the substantial hall complex is located immediately to the south of the church.

As many of the construction materials from the Swan Street church building were reused, including the bricks, flooring and roofing both internally and externally, the church building features an unusual blend of architectural styles, representing both Arts and Crafts and early Art Deco.

Elements of Thomas Watts and Sons' Arts and Crafts designs were copied for the four-bay nave, transepts and chancel with adjacent vestry and organ chamber. However, the crenellated brick bell tower, baptistery and "west" front facing Burnley Street show some features of early Art Deco design.

The pews, choir stalls, pulpit, memorials, pipe organ, stained glass windows, leadlights, and altar from the Swan Street church were also transferred to the present church building.

The church building and adjacent hall complex were dedicated on 27 October 1926.

The church was subject to major rectification work in 2013. The church building was underpinned, drainage installed and the ground surrounding the church was sealed by paved concrete.

=== Bell tower ===
St Bartholomew's bell tower, a local landmark, houses a set of six bells, cast by Whitechapel Bell Foundry, London, in 2014. The bells were consecrated by the Archbishop of Melbourne, Philip Freier, on 24 August 2014, on the Feast of St Bartholomew. The tenor bell, tuned to D, weighs 203 kg. The bell tower was renovated in 2015 and the new bells were hung in April 2015. The first ¼ peal was rung on Sunday 26 April 2015.

The bell tower formerly housed a peal of eight bells, which were cast and installed between 1927 and 1929 by the local firm of John Danks & Son. The peal was commissioned as a result of a legacy from Agnes Challingsworth, whose family presumably ran the engineering works along the Burnley railway line; the inscribed parapet "A. Challingsworth" is still partially observable.

The first bell was dedicated on 6 March 1927. A further seven bells (funded by Agnes Challingsworth's bequest) were blessed at Evensong on 3 March 1929. The bells were rung for the first time by a band of ringers from St Paul's Cathedral, Melbourne. The tenor (or the largest) bell weighs approximately 256 kg and the weights range in size down to the treble (or smallest) which weighs approximately 40 kg.

The eight Burnley bells were originally hung "dead", or immovable, from two parallel girders. They were sounded by the Danks' "Patent Clapper and Trigger", which obviated the need for the bell to be swung. Instead, by pulling a rope the clapper was impelled against the inner face of the bell. This had one very important advantage: in the absence of a team of eight ringers the bells could be sounded by four ringers each handling two ropes.

In 1988, to mark the Australian Bicentennial, six of the bells were converted to "full circle" swinging operation from the original chiming operation. The original metal tower louvres were then replaced with wooden shutters which can be opened or closed to alter decibel levels and the ringing chamber was made accessible by a spiral staircase.

=== Wayside Calvary ===
On 11 November 1956, the wayside Calvary outside the "west" front of the church on Burnley Street was dedicated by the vicar, the Revd Father Lyle McIntyre.

=== Stained glass windows ===
Like many church buildings, the windows in St Bartholomew's Church come from many different eras and display various architectural and artistic styles.

The stained glass windows behind the high altar depicting Saint Bartholomew are the work of the Melbourne glass studio of Brooks, Robinson & Co. and are from the demolished Swan Street church building. Most of the remaining windows were also brought from the Swan Street church building and consist of Arts and Crafts leadlights, incorporating green "bottle" glass with pink borders, casting a distinctive light across the interior.

There are also two rose windows located high in the "north" and "south" transepts and other more modern stained glass at the rear of the church, both near the baptistery and in the entrance porch. A stained glass window depicting the crucifixion, originally from Holy Trinity Church, Port Melbourne, was installed sometime in the early 2000s. It has since been removed and reinstalled into the new church at Port Melbourne.

== See also ==
- List of Anglo-Catholic churches
