= Yarra Bank Highway =

Urban highway in Melbourne, Australia

Yarra Bank Highway (numerous constituent roads) Victoria
- Coordinates: 37.827266°S 144.966063°E (West end); 37.823323°S 144.978443°E (East end)

General information
- Type: Highway
- Length: 2.1 km (1.3 mi)
- Gazetted: May 1993
- Route number(s): Metro Route 20 (1989–present) (Southbank–Melbourne)
- Former route number: M1 (1997–2000); National Route 1 (1988–1997); Metro Route 2 (1965–1989) (Southbank–Melbourne)
- Tourist routes: Tourist Drive 2 (1989–present) (Southbank–Melbourne)

Major junctions
- West end: West Gate Freeway; Southbank, Melbourne
- City Road; Alexandra Parade; Batman Avenue
- East end: Olympic Boulevard; Melbourne

Highway system
- Highways in Australia; National Highway • Freeways in Australia; Highways in Victoria

Yarra Bank Highway is a short urban highway in central Melbourne, Australia. It runs parallel to the Yarra River and provides an important alternate route to CityLink's Domain and Burnley Tunnels, used by trucks carrying hazardous loads prohibited from the tunnels, and provides another route when the tunnels are closed for maintenance. Prior to the construction of CityLink, the highway provided the main link between the Monash and West Gate Freeways. This name covers many consecutive streets and is not widely known to most drivers, as the entire allocation is still best known as by the names of its constituent parts: Power Street, City Road, Alexandra Parade and Olympic Boulevard.

== Route ==
Yarra Bank Highway starts at the intersection of Power and Sturt Streets (southbound) and the West Gate Freeway off-ramp at Power Street (northbound), running north as a five-lane (three northbound, two southbound) single-carriageway road, where it nearly immediately intersects with and changes name to City Road, heading east as a six-lane, dual-carriageway road through the St Kilda Road underpass and the Arts Centre, where it changes name to Alexandra Avenue and narrows to a five-lane (three eastbound, two westbound) single-carriageway road. It intersects with and changes name to Olympic Boulevard and crosses the Yarra River over the Swan Street Bridge, to terminate immediately afterwards at the intersection with Batman Avenue on the river's eastern bank.

== History ==
With construction starting on the Swan Street Bridge in 1946, traffic levels along Alexandra Avenue were predicted to rise and an underpass underneath St Kilda Road was proposed in 1948, to replace the existing at-grade intersection with City Road; funds were set aside to plan an underpass along Alexandra Avenue in April 1952. The passing of the Melbourne (St Kilda-Road Underpass) Lands Bill 1969 through the Parliament of Victoria on 22 April 1969, converted Crown Land in the area to a road reserve, enabling Melbourne and Metropolitan Board of Works (MMBW) to award a $2 million contract to Leighton Contractors. The Melbourne and Metropolitan Tramways Board installed new tracks along Nolan Street (today Southbank Boulevard) to reach Sturt Street in May 1970 to divert away from the former alignment along City Road where it met the new overpass. Construction on the overpass began in April 1970, and was eventually completed and opened to traffic by the end of 1971. Responsibility for the underpass was transferred from the MMBW to the Country Roads Board on 1 July 1974. The passing of the Melbourne (Snowden Gardens) Land Act 1975 on 2 May 1975 allowed the remaining Crown land between the underpass and the Yarra River to be reserved as a site for the Arts Centre Melbourne, with Hamer Hall eventually completed there in 1982.

Yarra Bank Highway (as its constituent roads) was signed as Metropolitan Route 2 along City Road and Alexandra Avenue in 1965; it was replaced by Tourist Drive 2 in 1989. Metropolitan Route 20 was also signed along City Road, Alexandra Avenue and Swan Street (today Olympic Boulevard) in 1989.

The passing of the Transport Act 1983 (itself an evolution from the original Highways and Vehicles Act 1924) provided for the declaration of State Highways, roads two-thirds financed by the state government through VicRoads. State Highway (Power Street) and State Highway (City Road) were declared State Highways in May 1993, along Power Street from the ramps of the West Gate Freeway to City Road in Southbank, and then east along City Road to the St Kilda Road underpass at the eastern edge of Southbank. These two highways were fused into one some time later, renamed Yarra Bank Highway, and extended east along Alexandra Avenue, across the Yarra River over the Swan Street Bridge, along Batman Avenue to meet the northern end of the South Eastern Arterial, and Brunton Avenue to terminate at Punt Road in September 1994; all roads were known (and signposted) as their constituent parts. This was eventually truncated back to the intersection of Swan Street with Batman Avenue once the CityLink project subsumed the alignment of Batman Avenue in late 1999.

The passing of the Road Management Act 2004 granted the responsibility of overall management and development of Victoria's major arterial roads to VicRoads: in 2004, VicRoads declared Yarra Bank Highway (Arterial #6240) beginning at the ramps from the West Gate Freeway in Southbank and ending at Olympic Boulevard in Melbourne, as before, the road is still presently known (and signposted) as its constituent parts.

The western section of Swan Street between Alexandra Avenue and Punt Road was renamed to Olympic Boulevard in November 2006, in tribute to the 1956 Melbourne Olympics.

== Major intersections ==
Yarra Bank Highway is entirely contained within the City of Melbourne local government area.

Location	km	mi	Destinations	Notes
Southbank	0.0	0.0	Sturt Street – Southbank	No access from Sturt Street to Power Street northbound; one way southbound only No left turn from Power Street into Sturt Street northbound
Southbank	0.1	0.062	West Gate Freeway (M1 west) – Laverton North, Werribee; CityLink (M1 east) – Kooyong, Chadstone	Westbound and eastbound exits to Power Street northbound only; no access from Power Street southbound to CityLink (Burnley Tunnel) eastbound Western terminus of highway
Southbank	0.5	0.31	City Road (Metro Route 20/Tourist Route 2 west) – Werribee, Geelong; Power Street (north) – City	Western terminus of concurrency with Tourist Route 2 Metro Route 20 continues west along City Road
Melbourne	1.6	0.99	Linlithgow Avenue, to St Kilda Road (Metro Route 3) – City, St Kilda	
Melbourne	1.9	1.2	Alexandra Parade (Tourist Route 2) – South Yarra, Burnley	No right turn from Alexandra Parade into Olympic Boulevard eastbound Eastern terminus of concurrency with Tourist Route 2
Yarra River	2.0	1.2	Swan Street Bridge	
Melbourne	2.1	1.3	Batman Avenue – City, to CityLink (M1 east) – Kooyong, Chadstone	Toll incurred heading either direction on Batman Avenue
Melbourne	2.1	1.3	Olympic Boulevard (Metro Route 20 east) – Burnley, Camberwell	Eastern terminus of highway, Metro Route 20 continues east along Olympic Boulevard
1.000 mi = 1.609 km; 1.000 km = 0.621 mi: Incomplete access; Tolled; Route transition

== See also ==
- List of Melbourne highways
