= Bridge Road =

Bridge Road may refer to:

- Bridge Road (Impington), a football stadium home to Histon F.C.
- Bridge Road, Melbourne, a major shopping strip in Melbourne, Australia
