= Chandler Highway =

Highway in Melbourne, Australia

Chandler Highway Victoria
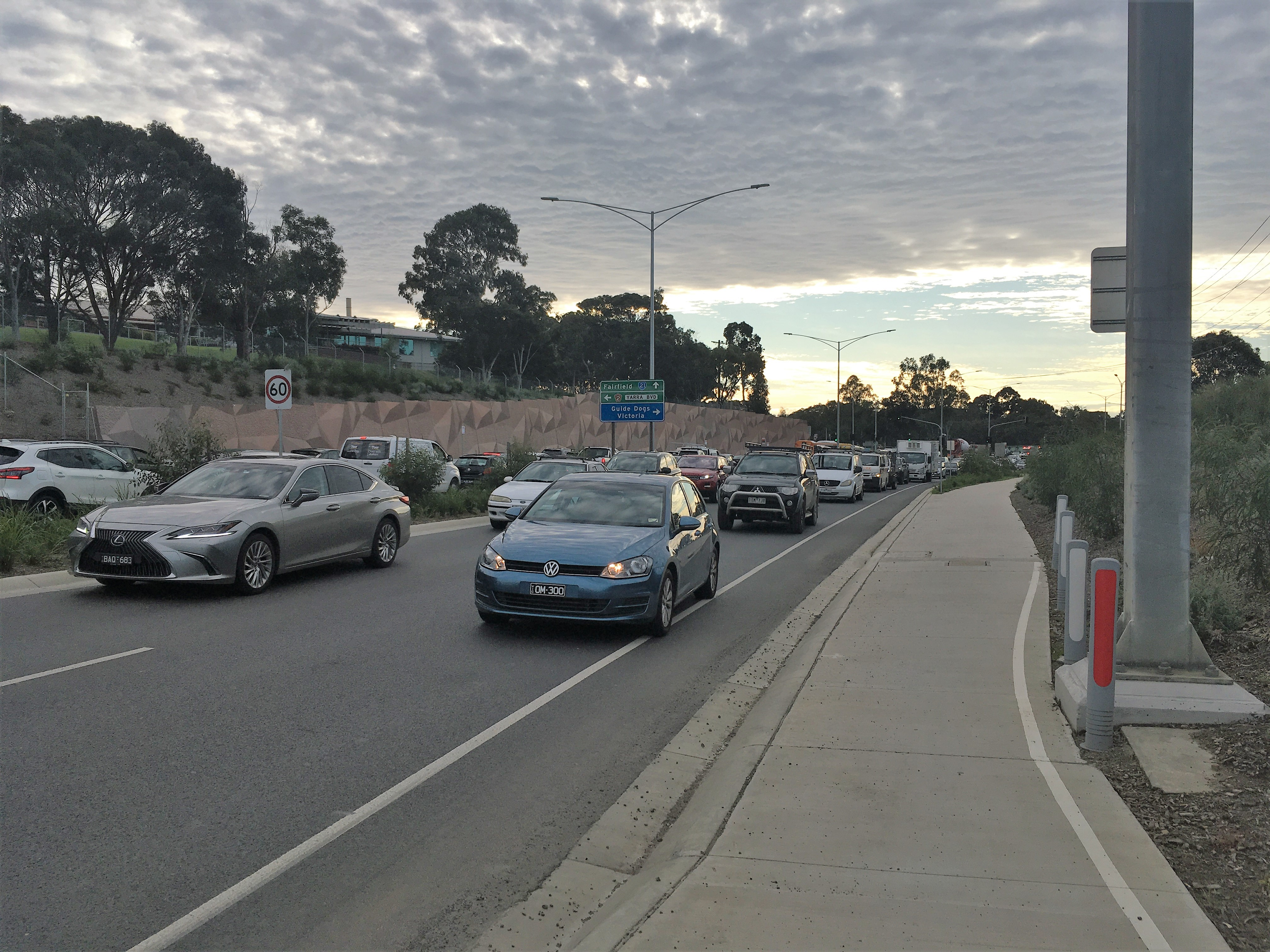
- Chandler Highway, Kew
- Coordinates: 37°46′55″S 145°01′30″E (North end); 37°47′35″S 145°01′53″E (South end)

General information
- Type: Road
- Length: 1.4 km (0.9 mi)
- Gazetted: September 1960
- Route number(s): Metro Route 21 (1965–present); Entire route
- Former route number: Metro Route 2 (1965–1989) (Alphington–Kew)
- Tourist routes: Tourist Route 2 (Alphington–Kew)

Major junctions
- North end: Grange Road; Alphington, Melbourne
- Heidelberg Road; Yarra Boulevard; Eastern Freeway; Princess Street
- South end: Earl Street; Kew, Melbourne

Chandler Highway is a short road in the inner eastern suburbs of Melbourne, connecting Alphington over the Yarra River and Eastern Freeway to Kew. Its total length is less than 2 kilometres, leading to the claim that it is "the shortest highway in the world". It was named after a prominent local businessman and politician A. E. Chandler, who was instrumental in pushing through the development of the Outer Circle railway.

== Route ==
In the north, the Chandler Highway commences at the intersection with Heidelberg Road and Grange Road in Alphington, and runs south as a six-lane, dual-carriageway road, crossing the Yarra River shortly afterwards, and narrowing to a four-lane dual-carriageway road at the intersection with Yarra Boulevard on the river's southern bank.

== History ==
The Fairfield Park to Riversdale section of the Outer Circle railway line opened on 24 March 1891, running from Fairfield Park station, via East Camberwell station, to Riversdale station. The line closed shortly after, in 1893, due to a lack of passengers, leaving a disused railway bridge crossing the Yarra River. After the rails were lifted from the bridge in 1919, the single-track railway line north of the bridge, running from Fairfield station through the middle of the Heidelberg Road-Chandler Highway intersection, became the Australian Paper Manufacturers siding, which was closed in the mid-1990s. In 1930, the bridge was re-purposed as the "Chandler Highway", which crossed the Yarra and incorporated Fulham Road, south of Heidelberg Road, which the former railway had cut through. (Note: According to the Darebin Historical Encyclopedia it was renamed in 1994. The 1966 the Melway street directory appeared to contradict that.)

The Chandler Highway and Bridge Act 1954, passed by the Parliament of Victoria on 4 May 1954, declared the Chandler Highway over the former rail bridge a "public highway" and removed any obligation on the Victorian Railways to maintain it. In December 1954, the Country Roads Board (CRB) (later VicRoads) performed major maintenance on the bridge, involving deck renewal and the strengthening of the original trusses. It was discovered that the amount of steel corrosion was much greater than expected, lengthening the completion time well into the following year. On 7 September 1960, the CRB declared the Chandler Highway a Main Road, from Heidelberg Road in Alphington, to Princess Street in Kew.

The Chandler Highway became Metropolitan Route 21 in 1965. It shared Metropolitan Route 2, from Yarra Boulevard on the southern bank of the river, to the road's northern terminus at Heidelberg Road, also designated in 1965. That was replaced by Tourist Route 2 in 1989.

The passing of the Road Management Act 2004 gave the responsibility for the management and development of Victoria's major arterial roads to VicRoads. In 2004, VicRoads declared the road as Chandler Highway (Arterial #5859), from Heidelberg Road in Alphington, to Princess Street in Kew. Despite being called a highway, the road is still classified as a Main Road by VicRoads.

Chandler Highway was originally planned to be extended east along the former Outer Circle railway line corridor to the intersection of Earl, Asquith and Valerie Streets intersect at High Street in East Kew, and, although the route was still listed as a "proposed arterial" in 1980s editions of the Melway street directory, the reserve has since been landscaped. At the diamond interchange with Eastern Freeway, there are visible pavements reserved for the unconstructed entry/exit ramps.

=== Old Chandler Highway Bridge ===
Old Chandler Highway Bridge
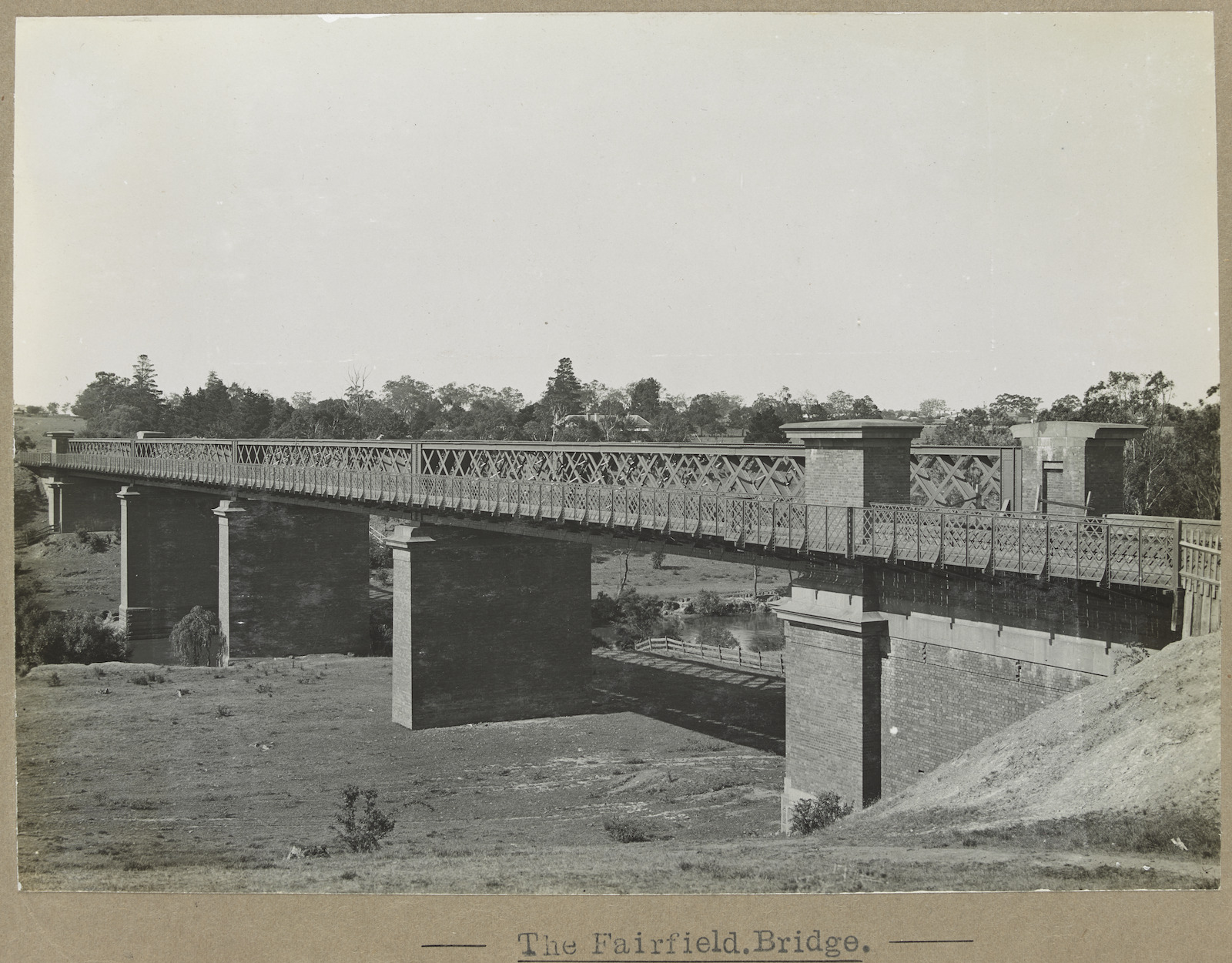
- The railway bridge c. 1905 – c. 1928, that carried the Outer Circle line, subsequently converted for road use; and later for shared pedestrian / cycle use
- Coordinates: 37°47′13″S 145°01′32″E
- Carries: Outer Circle railway line (1891-1893); Footbridge (1897–1930); Chandler Highway (1930–2019); Main Yarra Trail (since 2019)
- Crosses: Yarra River
- Locale: Melbourne, Victoria, Australia
- Begins: Alphington, Yarra City
- Ends: Kew, Boroondara City
- Other names: Old Chandler Highway Bridge; Fairfield Railway Bridge
- Named for: A. E. Chandler
- Owner: VicRoads
- Preceded by: Darebin Creek Trail bridge
- Followed by: (New) Chandler Highway Bridge; Fairfield Pipe Bridge

Characteristics
- Design: Lattice truss girder bridge
- Material: Wrought iron
- Trough construction: Timber (1891-1928); Reinforced concrete (1930)
- Pier construction: Brick with bluestone abutments
- Total length: 137 m (449 ft)
- Longest span: 35 m (115 ft)
- No. of spans: 4
- Piers in water: 3

History
- Designer: John Monash
- Engineering design by: Public Works Department
- Construction start: February 1889
- Construction end: November 1890
- Opened: March 1891; 135 years ago
- Rebuilt: 1930; c. 2019
- Closed: 1893–1930 (to rail traffic)

Victorian Heritage Register
- Official name: Chandler Highway Bridge
- Type: Registered Place
- Designated: 30 June 2016
- Reference no.: VHR H2354
- Heritage overlay no.: HO067
- Categories: Transport - Rail; Transport - Road

Location
- Interactive map of Old Chandler Highway Bridge

The original railway bridge, connecting Alphington and Kew across the Yarra River, was started in February 1889 but not completed until November 1890. The supervising engineer was John Monash. The bridge consists of a four-span iron box girder with red brick abutments and piers, capped with dressed bluestone. The girders are diagonally braced, with wrought iron lattice balustrading. There is a cantilevered walkway along the west side.

The bridge is one of the few 19th-century bridges remaining in the metropolitan area. It is a local landmark, being substantially intact and a prominent element in the area. The bridge was added to the Victorian Heritage Register on 30 June 2016 in recognition of its historical significance.

==== Congestion and replacement ====
At its peak in c. 2018, the bridge carried 44,000 vehicles per day, with resultant significant bottlenecks and traffic congestion, since the four-lane highway was funnelled into the two lanes of the old railway bridge. The bridge on Chandler Highway regularly featured in the RACV/Leader bi-annual Redspot survey of Melbourne's worst points of traffic congestion, and in 2014 was named in the survey as the worst point of congestion in Melbourne.

Fiona Richardson, the Labor Member for Northcote, led a community campaign during 2007 to 2010 to the Brumby government for duplication of the bridge. In October 2010, VicRoads released four proposed options for improving the Yarra crossing with a new bridge:

- add an additional two-lane bridge on either the east or west side of the existing bridge. The existing bridge would be retained as a two-lane road bridge bringing the total lanes up to four.
- add an additional four-lane bridge on either the east or west side of the existing bridge. The existing bridge would be used as a pedestrian/cycle bridge. Local cycle groups wanted to see this bridge fully integrated into the shared path network via the Yarra Trail and the Anniversary Trail with an extension of the Anniversary Trail to Fairfield railway station.

As the Northcote electorate was one of the key electoral contests between Labor and the Greens at the 2010 state election, the Chandler Highway Bridge became a key election issue. The Labor Party committed to duplicating the bridge, while the Greens opposed such duplication. The seat was subsequently held by Labor, but the party lost the state election to the Baillieu Liberal National coalition. Plans to duplicate the bridge halted.

In the intervening period the Amcor Paper Mill ceased operations and vacated the site in 2012 before the site was sold in mid-2013. Successive Victorian governments approved residential development at the former Amcor site, subject to detailed planning including addressing any increased traffic congestion in an already gridlocked area.

On 15 June 2014 Labor Opposition Leader Daniel Andrews and Fiona Richardson announced that Labor would commit $110 million to fix Chandler Highway with construction works to commence immediately, if Labor was elected to govern at the 2014 state election, scheduled for November.

==== New Chandler Highway Bridge ====
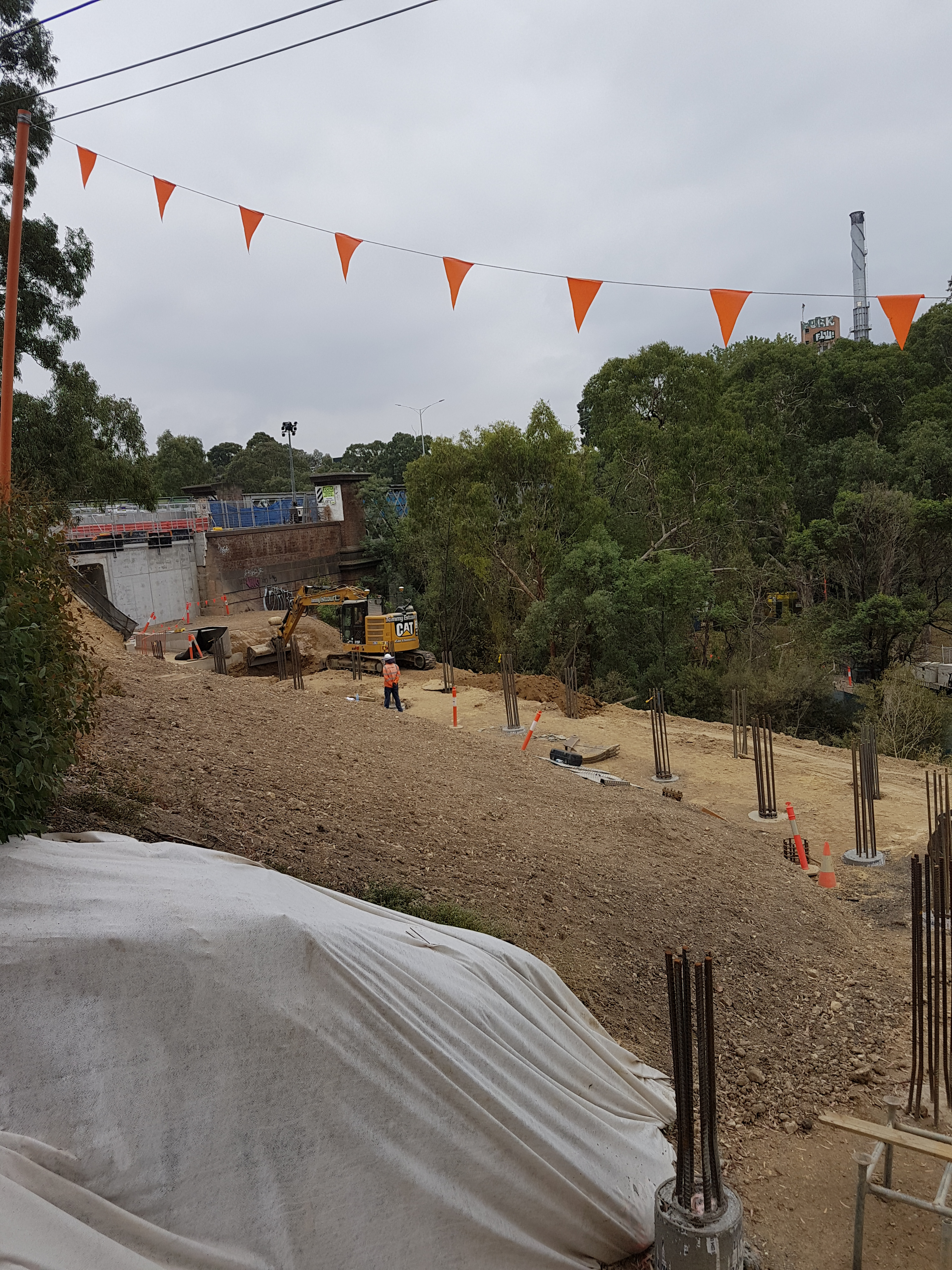
New bicycle path underpass works at Chandler Highway March 2019

Upon its election in 2014, the Andrews Labor government announced that construction would proceed on a new six-lane bridge on the western side. This met with some objections by residents, concerned about the proximity of the road to their residences, but the then Roads Minister Luke Donnellan stated that this was a more environmentally sensitive option, which allowed Guide Dogs Victoria to continue operating on their present site. Construction commenced in mid-2017, all six lanes were opened to traffic in March 2019, and all work was completed in July 2019.

==== Shared pedestrian and cycle use bridge ====
After the new Chandler Highway road bridges opened in 2019, the old bridge was restored, and is now a dedicated shared pedestrian and cycling path that links the Main Yarra and Outer Circle trails. In order to highlight the initial purpose of the bridge, rail tracks were retrospectively reinstalled in the concrete deck. The project also included the construction of a bicycle underpass under the bridge for the Main Yarra Trail, eradicating the need for cyclists to ascend 79 steps to reach the highway and rejoin the trail on the other side.

== Major intersections ==
LGA	Location	km	mi	Destinations	Notes
Darebin–Yarra boundary	Alphington	0.0	0.0	Grange Road (Metro Route 21 north) – Reservoir	Northern terminus of highway at traffic lights; road & Metro Route 21 continues north as Grange Road
Darebin–Yarra boundary	Alphington	0.0	0.0	Heidelberg Road (Metro Route 46 east, west/Tourist Route 2 east) – Heidelberg, Greensborough, Clifton Hill, Melbourne	Northern terminus of concurrency with Tourist Route 2
Yarra River		0.5	0.31	Chandler Bridge	
Boroondara	Kew	0.7	0.43	Yarra Boulevard (Tourist Route 2)	Southern terminus of concurrency with Tourist Route 2
Boroondara	Kew	1.1	0.68	Eastern Freeway (M3) – Frankston, Ringwood, City	Diamond interchange
Boroondara	Kew	1.4	0.87	Princess Street (Metro Route 21 south) – Kew, Burnley	Metro Route 21 continues south at Princess Street
Boroondara	Kew	1.4	0.87	Earl Street (east) – Balwyn	Southern terminus of highway at traffic lights; road continues east as Earl Street
Concurrency terminus; Route transition

== See also ==
- Crossings of the Yarra River
- List of places on the Victorian Heritage Register in the City of Boroondara
- List of places on the Victorian Heritage Register in the City of Yarra
- Main Yarra Trail
- Outer Circle Trail
