= Darebin Creek Bridge =

Bridge in Melbourne, Australia

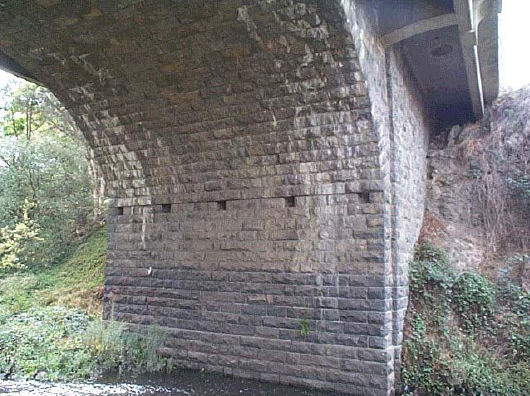
- Coordinates: 37.778879°S 145.035594°E

History
- Designer: John C Climie CE
- Constructed by: O. H. Willison
- Opened: 1864

Location
- Interactive map of Darebin Creek Bridge

Darebin Creek Bridge is a bluestone masonry arch and concrete road bridge on Heidelberg road Alphington over Darebin Creek. It was built for Heidelberg Road Trust to a design of John C Climie CE and constructed by contractor O. H. Willison in 1864, to replace an earlier 1852 timber bridge which had fallen into a poor state of repair. The bridge was made possible as a result of funds obtained from a toll gate, established on the east side of the Darebin Creek by the Heidelberg Road Trust. The toll keeper was Henry Holloway, and the charges included one farthing for every pig that crossed the bridge and up to eighteen pence for a carriage with four horses.

It was subsequently widened by the Country Roads Board (CRB) in 1937-8 probably to a design of W.A. (Allan) Ozanne. the bridge is one of the largest stone arch bridges in Victoria and among the oldest surviving bridges in Melbourne.
