= Devonshire Arms Hotel, Fitzroy =

Devonshire Arms Hotel
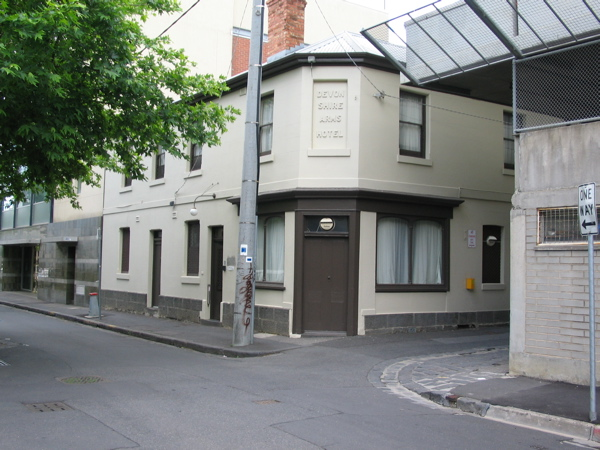
- Interactive map of the Devonshire Arms Hotel area

General information
- Location: Fitzroy Street, Fitzroy, VIC 3068, Australia
- Coordinates: 37°48′25″S 144°58′34″E
- Opened: 1843

The Devonshire Arms Hotel is a former pub located at 38 Fitzroy Street, Fitzroy, in the state of Victoria, Australia. It operated as a hotel from 1843 to 1920. It is Fitzroy's oldest surviving building and Melbourne's oldest known extant hotel.

The Devonshire Arms Hotel opened in 1843. The hotel was erected and owned for 50 years by local entrepreneur Francis Clark. Clark had arrived in Melbourne in 1840, and became manager of James Palmer's lemonade and soda factory. He opened a butcher's shop near the corner of Bourke Street and Elizabeth Street in 1845, and later another shop in Richmond. He bought speculative property around Fitzroy and Alphington, and lived a prosperous life. Although he hailed from Essex, the hotel was given the name Devonshire Arms, owing to the pre-goldrush population of the area being principally from the south-west of England.

It was one of 27 Melbourne hotels forced to close by a July 1920 meeting of the Licensing Reduction Board, formally being delicensed in December that year. The building was raided by police in January 1921, who seized alcohol and laid charges for selling liquor without a license, but the charges were dismissed. The building later operated as a hostel.

The building is now part of St Vincent's Hospital, housing the hospital's Department of Addiction Medicine.

The site is listed on the Victorian Heritage Register and is included a Heritage Overlay.
