= Bridge Road, Melbourne =

Road in Melbourne, Australia

Coordinates: 37°49′3.23″S 144°59′25.18″E

Bridge Road
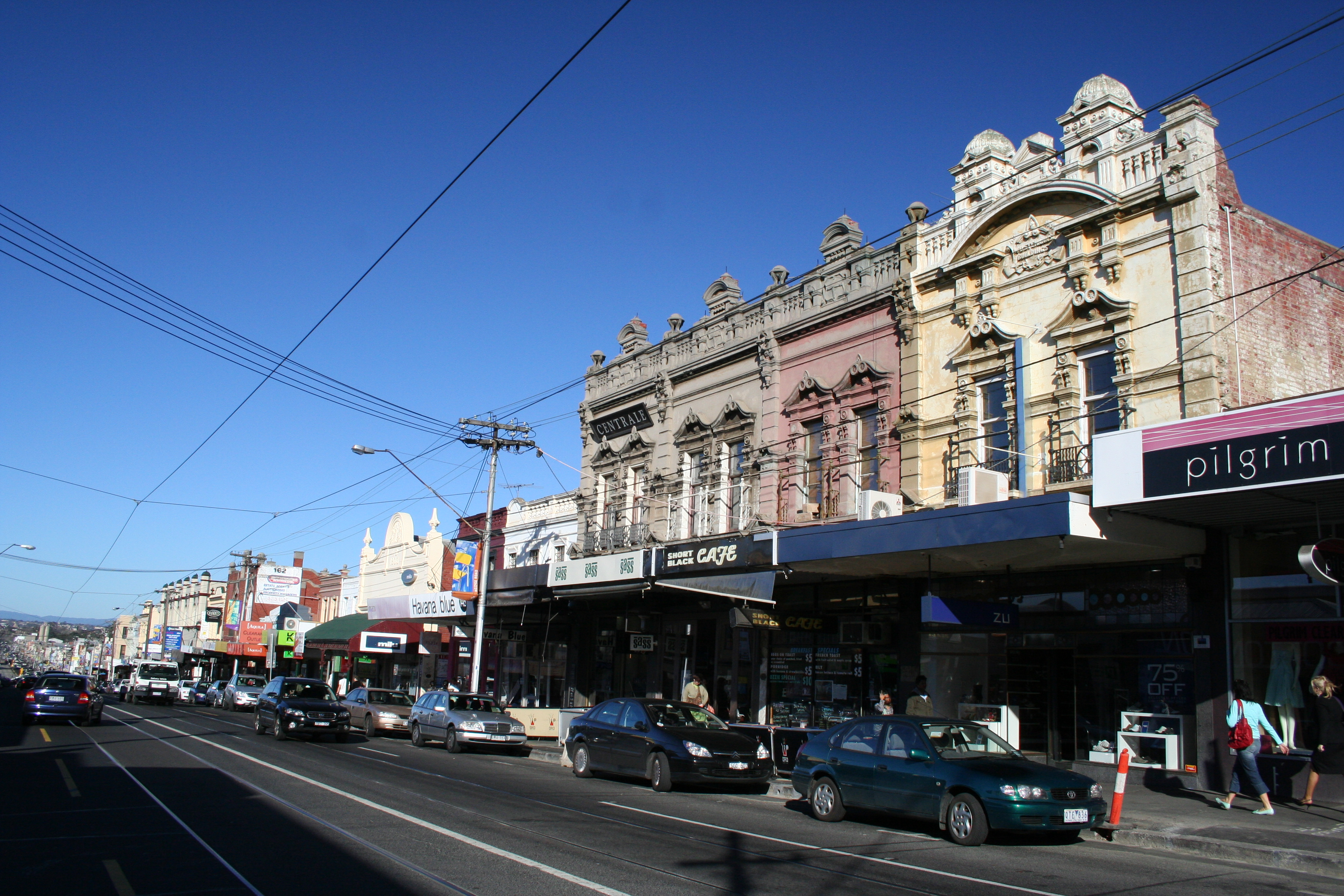
- Looking east along Bridge Road, from the intersection with Lennox Street

General information
- Type: Road
- Length: 2.4 km (1.5 mi)
- Opened: ~1850
- Route number(s): Metro Route 30 (1965-present)
- Tourist routes: Tourist Route 2 (1989-present) (over Hawthorn Bridge)

Major junctions
- West end: Wellington Parade; Richmond, Melbourne
- Hoddle Street; Punt Road; Yarra Boulevard; Church Street
- East end: Burwood Road; Hawthorn, Melbourne

Location(s)
- Major suburbs: Richmond, Burnley, Hawthorn

Bridge Road is a major shopping strip in Melbourne, Australia. It is best known for its abundance of restaurants, cafes and shopping, which makes it a popular tourist attraction. The Richmond Town Hall and Epworth Hospital are amongst the landmarks of Bridge Road.

== Route ==
Bridge Road begins at the intersection with Wellington Parade, Hoddle Street and Punt Road in Richmond and runs east through RIchmond as a four-lane, single-carriageway road for just over two kilometres, sharing surface tram tracks, until it crosses Church Street and widens slightly to allow trams a dedicated median in the centre of the road, then passes Richmond Town Hall. The road narrows back again to share tram tracks just before its intersection with Yarra Boulevard, before crossing the Yarra River over the Hawthorn Bridge to its fork into Church Street and Burwood Road on the other side of the river.

Mary Rogers Square − which is on the corner of Bridge Road and Church Street − is named after Mary Rogers, who served on the City of Richmond from 1920 until 1925 as the first woman elected to local government in Victoria.

Tram routes 48 and 75 pass along the entire length of Bridge Road.

== History ==
Bridge Road is classified as a heritage area as its history dates back to 1837, two years after the European settlement of the colony of Victoria. The first land sales in the area took place on 1 August 1839.

Historical plaques are placed on many buildings and provide a glimpse into the development of Bridge Road.

The majority of the existing 19th-century buildings in Bridge Road are shops which date from the 1870s and 1880s. The horse-drawn omnibuses which brought shoppers to the area were replaced by cable trams in 1885, which in turn were replaced by an electrified tram service in 1916. Shortly afterwards Cinema Richmond opened in 1919 adjacent to the Town Hall.

Bridge Road was signed as Metropolitan Route 30 between Richmond and Hawthorn in 1965, sharing a short concurrency with Tourist Route 2 over the Hawthorn Bridge from 1989.

The passing of the Road Management Act 2004 granted the responsibility of overall management and development of Victoria's major arterial roads to VicRoads: in 2004, VicRoads re-declared Bridge Road (Arterial #5285) to begin from the intersection with Hoddle Street and Punt Road in Richmond and end at Burwood Road in Hawthorn.

== Major intersections ==
LGA	Location	km	mi	Destinations	Notes
Melbourne–Yarra boundary	East Melbourne–Richmond boundary	0.0	0.0	Wellington Parade (Metro Route 30 west) – East Melbourne, City	Western terminus of road, Metro Route 30 continues west along Wellington Parade
Melbourne–Yarra boundary	East Melbourne–Richmond boundary	0.0	0.0	Hoddle Street (Metro Route 29 north) – Clifton Hill, Fitzroy North; Punt Road (Metro Route 29 south) – St Kilda, Elwood	
Yarra	Richmond	0.8	0.50	Church Street – Abbotsford, South Yarra, Balaclava	
Yarra	Richmond	1.6	0.99	Burnley Street – Abbotsford, Burnley	
Yarra	Richmond	2.2	1.4	Yarra Boulevard (Tourist Route 2) – Burnley	Western terminus of concurrency with Tourist Route 2
Yarra River		2.3	1.4	Hawthorn Bridge	
Boroondara	Hawthorn	2.4	1.5	Church Street (Metro Route 36/Tourist Route 2 north) – Kew, Doncaster, Heidelberg	Eastern terminus of concurrency with Tourist Route 2
Boroondara	Hawthorn	2.4	1.5	Burwood Road (Metro Route 30 east) – Camberwell	Eastern terminus of road, Metro Route 30 continues east along Burwood Road
1.000 mi = 1.609 km; 1.000 km = 0.621 mi: Concurrency terminus; Route transition
