= Hoddle Highway =

Highway in Melbourne, Victoria

Hoddle Highway (Hoddle Main Road) Hoddle Street, Punt Road, Barkly Street Victoria
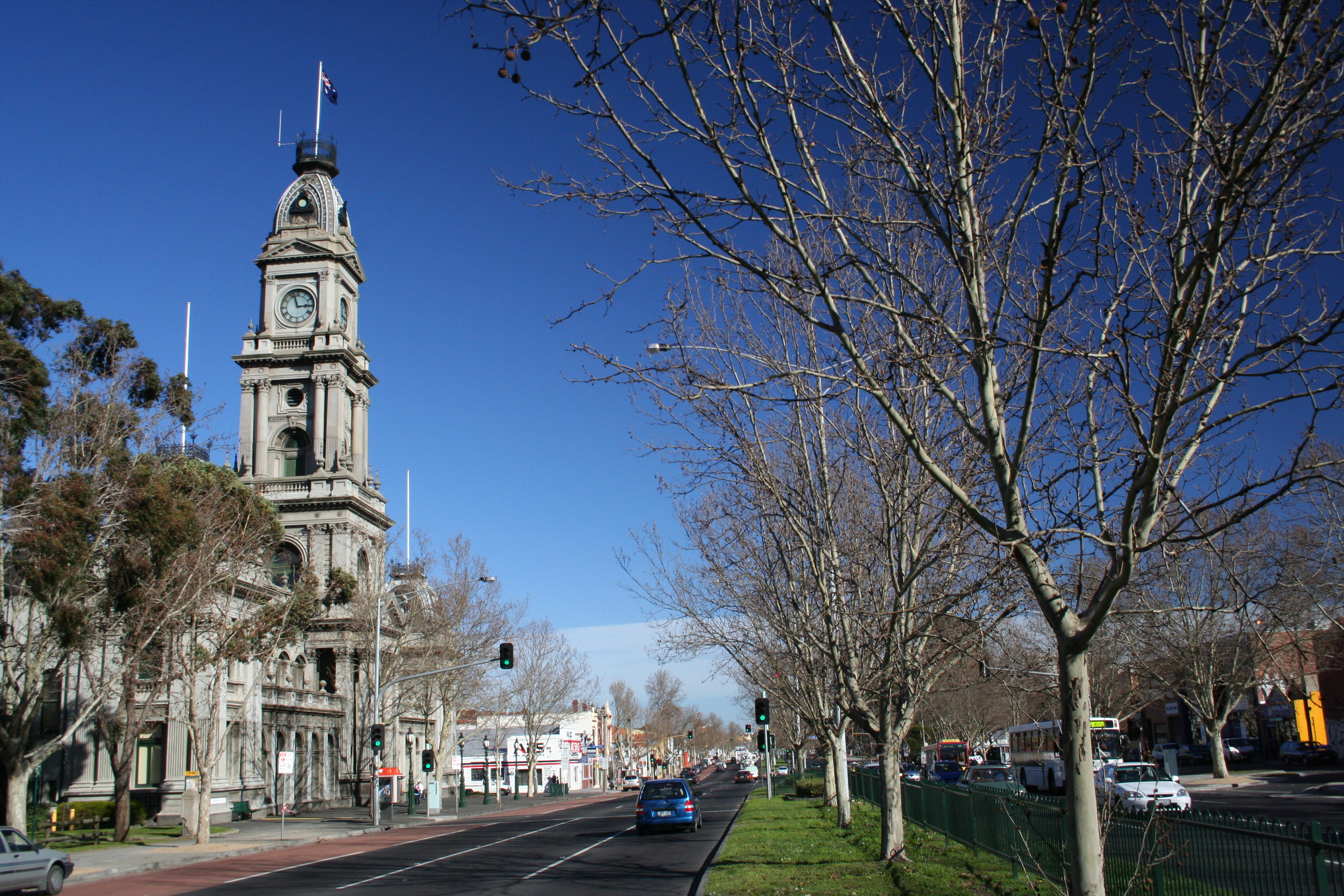
- Hoddle Street looking south, with the Collingwood Town Hall on the left
- Coordinates: 37.785565°S 144.994778°E (North end); 37.881852°S 144.977925°E (South end)

General information
- Type: Highway
- Length: 10.9 km (6.8 mi)
- Gazetted: September 1960 (as Main Road); September 1994 (as State Highway)
- Route number(s): Metro Route 29 (1965–present) Entire route; Concurrencies: Metro Route 3 (1965–present) (through St Kilda Junction)

Major junctions
- North end: High Street; Fitzroy North, Melbourne
- Heidelberg Road; Alexandra Parade; Eastern Freeway; Victoria Street; Swan Street; CityLink; Dandenong Road; St Kilda Road
- South end: Marine Parade; Elwood, Melbourne

Location(s)
- Major suburbs: Collingwood, Abbotsford, Richmond, South Yarra, Prahran, Windsor, St Kilda

Highway system
- Highways in Australia; National Highway • Freeways in Australia; Highways in Victoria

Hoddle Highway is an urban highway in Melbourne linking CityLink and the Eastern Freeway, itself a sub-section of Hoddle Main Road. Both of these names are not widely known to most drivers, as the entire allocation is still best known as by the names of its constituent parts: Hoddle Street, Punt Road and Barkly Street. This article will deal with the entire length of the corridor for sake of completion.

The highway is named after the surveyor Robert Hoddle, who planned central Melbourne's Hoddle Grid.

== Route ==
Hoddle Main Road starts at the intersection with Queens Parade and High Street in Fitzroy North and heads south as Hoddle Street, crossing Eastern Freeway one kilometre later (and from where the Hoddle Highway declaration officially starts). It continues south until the intersection with Wellington Parade and Bridge Road, changing name to Punt Road. It continues south, passing near the Melbourne Cricket Ground, under Citylink in Richmond, across the Yarra River via the Hoddle Bridge through the South Yarra district to where St Kilda Road and Dandenong Road meet at St Kilda Junction (where the highway declaration ends). Hoddle Main Road continues south on the other side of St Kilda Junction as Barkly Street through the St Kilda city centre, to eventually terminate at Marine Parade in Elwood.

== History ==
The elimination of the railway crossing at the Clifton Hill railway gates, where Heidelberg-Eltham Road (known today as Heidelberg Road) crossed the Hurstbridge and Whittlesea (now Mernda) railway lines and then Hoddle Street, was approved by the Victorian government on 19 May 1955, instructing the Country Roads Board to proceed with the construction of a road overpass. The board contracted the project to Lewis Construction Co, estimated to cost A£240,000. Work commenced in February 1956, with the southern portion open to traffic in April 1957, and the remaining sections, including the ramps leading to and from Hoddle Street, opening several weeks later in May 1957.

The passing of the Country Roads Act 1958 (itself an evolution from the original Highways and Vehicles Act 1924) provided for the declaration of State Highways and Main Roads, roads partially financed by the state government through the Country Roads Board. Hoddle Main Road was declared a Main Road on 7 September 1960, from Queens Parade in Fitzroy North, along Hoddle Street through Richmond, along Punt Road through South Yarra, and along Barkly Street to Elwood.

Hoddle Main Road (including all its constituent roads) was signed as Metropolitan Route 29 between Fitzroy North and Elwood in 1965.

The passing of the Transport Act 1983 updated the definition of State Highways. Hoddle Highway was declared a State Highway by VicRoads in September 1994 within Hoddle Main Road, from Victoria Street in Richmond to the St Kilda Junction in St Kilda, later extended north to the interchange with Eastern Freeway in January 1995; all roads were known (and signposted) as their constituent parts.

The passing of the Road Management Act 2004 granted the responsibility of overall management and development of Victoria's major arterial roads to VicRoads: in 2004, VicRoads re-declared the road as Hoddle Highway (Arterial #6080), beginning at the interchange of Hoddle Street with Eastern Freeway at Clifton Hill and ending at St Kilda Road (Nepean Highway) in St Kilda, while re-declaring the remnants between Clifton Hill and Elwood as Hoddle Main Road (Arterial #5880); as before, all roads are still known (and signposted) as their constituent parts.

=== 1969 Melbourne Transportation Plan ===
The Hoddle Street – Punt Road – Barkly Street corridor was designated in the 1969 Melbourne Transportation Plan as the F2 Freeway. Part of the F2 Freeway would have connected St Kilda Junction to the Metropolitan Ring Road at the Hume Freeway (Craigieburn Bypass), via the Hoddle Highway and Merri Creek.

== Hoddle Street massacre ==
In 1987, Hoddle Street was the site of a deadly shooting spree. The perpetrator, 19-year-old army recruit Julian Knight, killed seven people and injured 19 others during his rampage. Knight was sentenced to serve seven consecutive terms of life imprisonment.

== Major intersections ==
LGA	Location	km	mi	Destinations	Notes
Yarra	Clifton Hill–Fitzroy North boundary	0.0	0.0	High Street (Metro Route 29 northeast) – Northcote, Reservoir, Epping; Queens Parade (southwest) - Fitzroy North	Northern terminus of road, northern end of Hoddle Street; Metro Route 29 continues northeast along High Street
Yarra	Clifton Hill–Fitzroy North boundary	0.2	0.12	Heidelberg Road (Metro Route 46) - Fitzroy North, Ivanhoe, Greensborough, Diamond Creek	Westbound and eastbound entry to Heidelberg Road northbound only, westbound exit from Heidelberg Road southbound only
Yarra	Clifton Hill–Collingwood–Abbotsford tripoint	1.1	0.68	Alexandra Parade (Metro Route 83 west) – Carlton, Parkville; Eastern Freeway (M3 east) - Ringwood, Dandenong, Frankston	No access to Eastern Freeway westbound from Hoddle Street southbound Northern terminus of Hoddle Highway (declared)
Yarra	Collingwood–Abbotsford boundary	1.6	0.99	Johnson Street – Carlton, Kew, Ringwood	
Yarra–Melbourne boundary	Collingwood–Abbotsford–East Melbourne–Richmond quadripoint	2.7	1.7	Victoria Parade (Metro Route 32 west) - North Melbourne; Victoria Street (Metro Route 32 east) – Kew, Forest Hill, Montrose	
Yarra–Melbourne boundary	East Melbourne–Richmond boundary	3.6	2.2	Wellington Parade (Metro Route 30 west) – City; Bridge Road (Metro Route 30 east) – Camberwell	Southern end of Hoddle Street, northern end of Punt Road
Yarra–Melbourne boundary	East Melbourne–Melbourne–Richmond tripoint	4.2	2.6	Brunton Avenue – East Melbourne	
Yarra–Melbourne boundary	Melbourne–Richmond boundary	4.3	2.7	Gippsland railway line	
Yarra–Melbourne boundary	Melbourne–Richmond–Cremorne tripoint	4.4	2.7	Olympic Boulevard (Metro Route 20 west) – Southbank; Swan Street (Metro Route 20 east) – Burnley, Camberwell	
Yarra–Melbourne boundary	Melbourne–Cremorne boundary	4.9	3.0	CityLink (M1) - Kooyong, Chadstone, Narre Warren	Westbound exit from CityLink northbound only, eastbound entry to CityLink southbound only
Yarra River		5.0	3.1	Hoddle Bridge	
Melbourne–Stonnington boundary	South Yarra	5.1	3.2	Alexandra Avenue (Tourist Route 2) – Southbank, Burnley	
Melbourne–Stonnington boundary	South Yarra	6.0	3.7	Toorak Road (Metro Route 26) - Albert Park, Kooyong, Burwood East, Ferntree Gully	
Melbourne–Stonnington boundary	South Yarra–Melbourne–Prahran boundary	6.8	4.2	Commercial Road – Glen Iris, The Alfred Hospital	
Melbourne–Port Phillip–Stonnington tripoint	Melbourne–Prahran–Windsor boundary	7.3	4.5	High Street (Metro Route 24) - Albert Park, Glen Iris, Glen Waverley, Wantirna South	
Port Phillip–Stonnington boundary	St Kilda–Windsor boundary	7.9	4.9	St Kilda Road (Metro Route 3 north) – City; Queens Way (National Alt Route 1 east) – Oakleigh, Dandenong, Narre Warren	No access to St Kilda Road: one way southbound Northern terminus of concurrency with Metro Route 3
Port Phillip	St Kilda	8.0	5.0	St Kilda Road (Metro Route 3 north) – City; Queens Road (National Alt Route 1 west) – Southbank; Fitzroy Street – St Kilda	Westbound entry to Queens Road northbound only Southern terminus of Hoddle Highway (declared); Southern end of Punt Road, northern end of Barkly Street
Port Phillip	St Kilda	8.2	5.1	St Kilda Road (Metro Route 3 south) – Mordialloc, Frankston, Dromana, Portsea	No right turn from Barkly Street to St Kilda Road southbound Southern terminus of concurrency with Metro Route 3
Port Phillip	St Kilda	8.4	5.2	Princes Street (west) – St Kilda; Alma Road (east) - Caulfield North	
Port Phillip	St Kilda	8.9	5.5	Grey Street (west) – St Kilda; Inkerman Street (east) - Caulfield North	
Port Phillip	St Kilda	9.2	5.7	Carlisle Street - St Kilda, Balaclava, Caulfield East	
Port Phillip	Elwood	10.8	6.7	Glen Huntly Road - Elsternwick, Glen Huntly, Carnegie	
Port Phillip	Elwood	10.9	6.8	Marine Parade (Metro Route 33 north) - St Kilda, Port Melbourne; Ormond Esplanade (Metro Route 33 southeast) - Brighton, Sandringham, Mordialloc	Southern terminus of road and Metro Route 29; Southern end of Barkly Street
1.000 mi = 1.609 km; 1.000 km = 0.621 mi: Incomplete access; Route transition
