= Swan Street =

Street in Melbourne, Victoria, Australia

Swan Street Olympic Boulevard Victoria
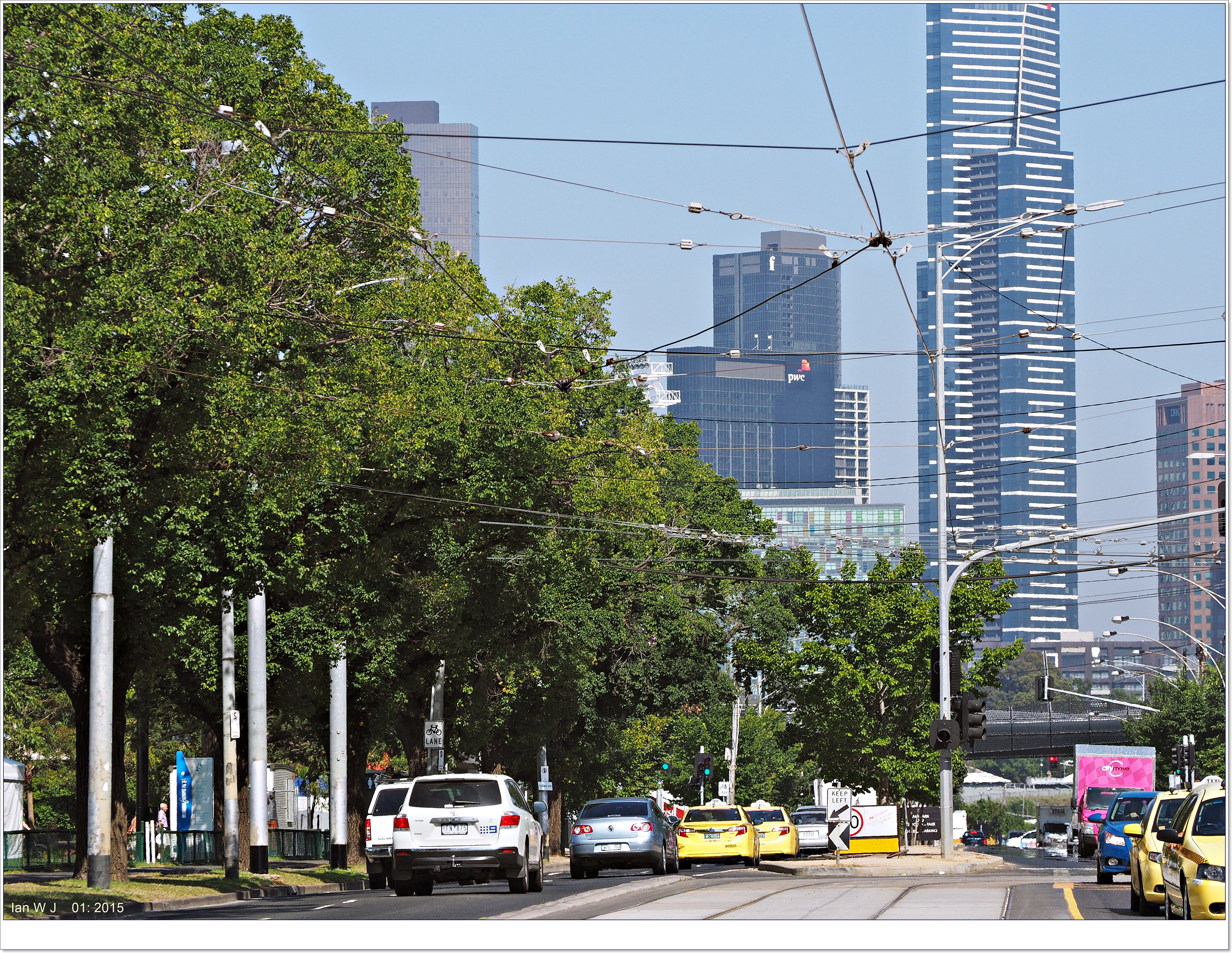
- Looking west along Olympic Boulevard east of Melbourne Park, just before the tram tracks diverge off-street
- Coordinates: 37°49′23″S 144°58′35″E (West end); 37°49′36″S 145°01′22″E (East end)

General information
- Type: Road
- Length: 4.2 km (2.6 mi)
- Route number(s): Metro Route 20 (1989–present) Entire route; Concurrencies: Metro Route 21 (1965–present) (through Burnley)
- Former route number: M1 (1997–2000); National Route 1 (1988–1997) (through Melbourne)

Major junctions
- West end: Alexandra Avenue; Melbourne
- Batman Avenue; Punt Road; Church Street; Burnley Street; Madden Avenue
- East end: Warren Road; Hawthorn, Melbourne

Location(s)
- Major suburbs: Richmond, Burnley

Swan Street (and its western section as Olympic Boulevard) is a major street running through the Melbourne suburbs of Richmond, Cremorne and Burnley. The street was named after the White Swan Hotel, built in 1852 on the corner of Swan and Church Streets.

== Route ==
Olympic Boulevard starts at the intersection with Alexandra Avenue on the southern bank of the Yarra River, heading east as a four-lane single-carriageway road and immediately crossing the river over the Swan Street Bridge, heading east through Melbourne Park and Olympic Park precinct, before meeting with Punt Road in Richmond. It changes name to Swan Street and becomes a restaurant and cafe precinct around Richmond station, including the historic Corner Hotel, followed by a retail section between Richmond and Cremorne including the Dimmey's department store, before becoming a factory seconds area towards Burnley. It continues east over the Lilydale and Belgrave railway lines, meets with Madden Grove in Burnley, before crossing the Yarra River again and ends at Wallen Road in Hawthorn on its northern bank. The road supports surface tram tracks just east of Melbourne Park all the way to Hawthorn, carrying the route 70 service.

== History ==
Swan Street was signed as Metropolitan Route 20 between Melbourne and Hawthorn in 1989. Metropolitan Route 21 runs concurrent along Swan Street from Madden Grove at Burnley to Wallen Road at Hawthorn from 1965.

The passing of the Road Management Act 2004 granted the responsibility of overall management and development of Victoria's major arterial roads to VicRoads: in 2004, VicRoads declared Swan Street (Arterial #5287) beginning at Yarra Bank Highway (Alexandra Avenue) in Melbourne and ending at Burnley-Kew Road (Madden Grove) in Burnley; this declaration formally includes today's Olympic Boulevard, but signposts along this section have kept its original name.

The western section of the road between Alexandra Avenue and Punt Road was renamed to Olympic Boulevard in November, 2006 in tribute to the 1956 Melbourne Olympics. The bridge over the railway lines was rebuilt in 1969 as part of a project to increase the number of tracks below.

=== Swan Street Bridge ===
Swan Street Bridge
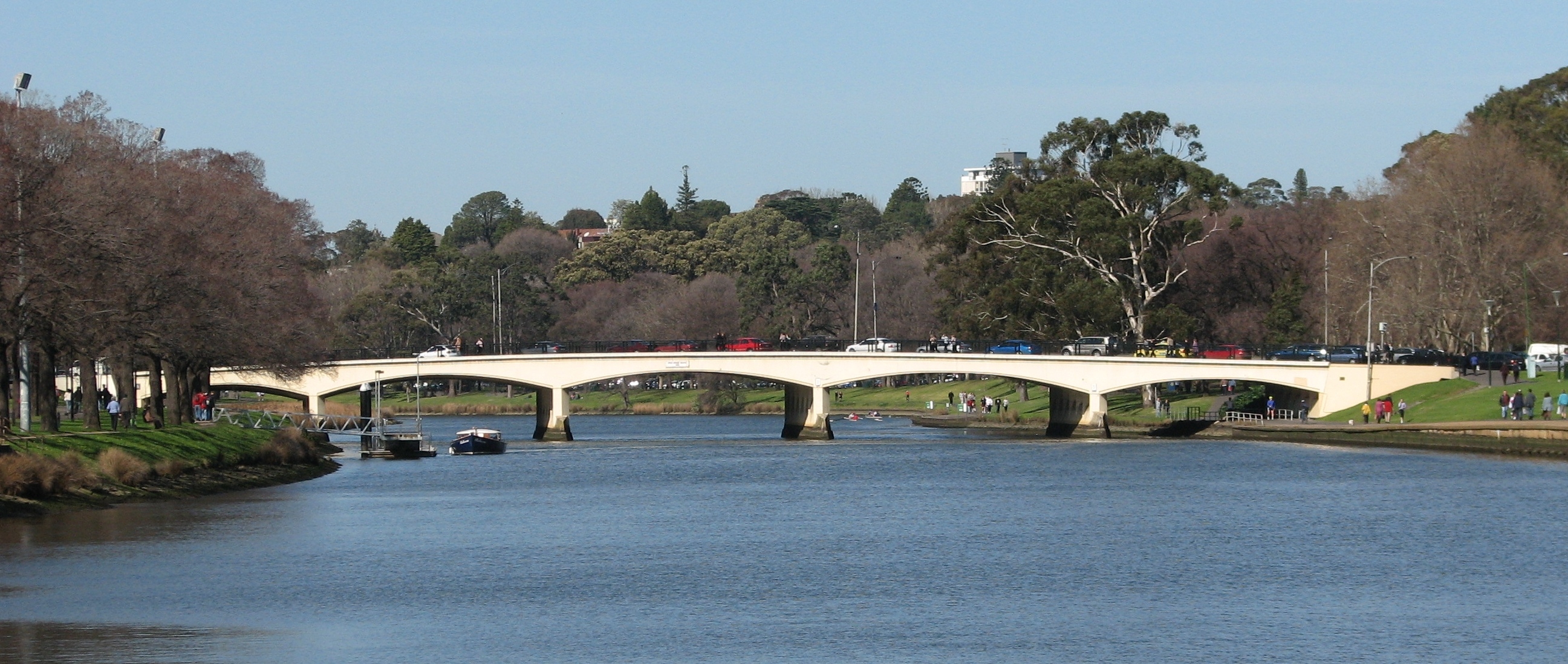
- The bridge before the 2017-8 upgrade
- Coordinates: 37°49′24″S 144°58′38″E
- Carries: Olympic Boulevard; pedestrians; cyclists
- Crosses: Yarra River
- Begins: Alexandra Gardens / Kings Domain
- Ends: Melbourne Park
- Owner: VicRoads
- Preceded by: Morell Bridge
- Followed by: Princes Bridge

Characteristics
- Design: Arch bridge
- Material: Steel
- Pier construction: Concrete
- Piers in water: 4

History
- Built: September 1946–April 1952
- Opened: August 1952; 74 years ago
- Rebuilt: September 2018

Statistics
- Daily traffic: 30,000 vehicles (2019)

The Swan Street Bridge still retains its name, despite the fact that it is no longer part of Swan Street.

Construction on the bridge started on 24 September 1946, with Commissioner of Public Works Pat Kennelly driving the first pile. The Country Roads Board tendered a contract for the building of the piers as the first stage of construction; the contractor commenced operations, but difficulties regarding supplies, both of materials and labour, eventually forced them to ask to be relieved of the contract; the Board proceeded to carry out the work with direct labour. Towards the end of January 1947, the shortage of steel became acute, followed by greater still reduction in the amount of cement available. As the Board considered it essential not to hamper river traffic more than absolutely necessary, and due to the shortage of materials, it was decided to close the job down temporarily for a year. By June 1948, 76 concrete piles had been completed, and further works constructing piers 3 and 4 were underway. By June 1950, one abutment and three river piers had been completed, and one-third of the formwork had been erected, however while material supplies were again satisfactory, progress had been badly hampered by a continuing shortage of labour, exacerbated by an industrial dispute in 1951 which held up work for a further four months, and the fact one-third of the workforce did not return to the site after the dispute had been settled. Despite this, work had progressed by June 1951 that all five piers had been completed and the formwork for the main span had been half-completed. The super-structure was declared completed in April 1952, with the placing of hand-rails, completion of the deck surface and removal of temporary river supports finished four months later.

It was opened for traffic six years later in August 1952.

The bridge was upgraded to carry an extra lane of eastbound traffic and new walking and cycling paths in March 2017, including demolishing and replacing the existing outer beams on the northern and southern side of the bridge, relocation of a critical gas main, and installation of feature lighting. Originally expected to be completed in September 2017, the project had to be re-designed when the 70-year-old plans for the bridge, specifically its technical drawings, were found to be incorrect. The bridge opened to five lanes' traffic in April 2018, and all remaining major works were eventually completed in September 2018. The upgraded bridge now caters for 30,000 vehicles per day, and later won an urban design commendation at the Victorian Architecture Awards in June 2019.

== See also ==
- Crossings of the Yarra River

| Next crossing upstream | Yarra River | Next crossing downstream |
| Morell Bridge (pedestrians; cyclists) | Swan Street | Princes Bridge (trams; vehicles; pedestrians; cyclists) |
