= Alphington, Victoria =

Alphington
- Suburb
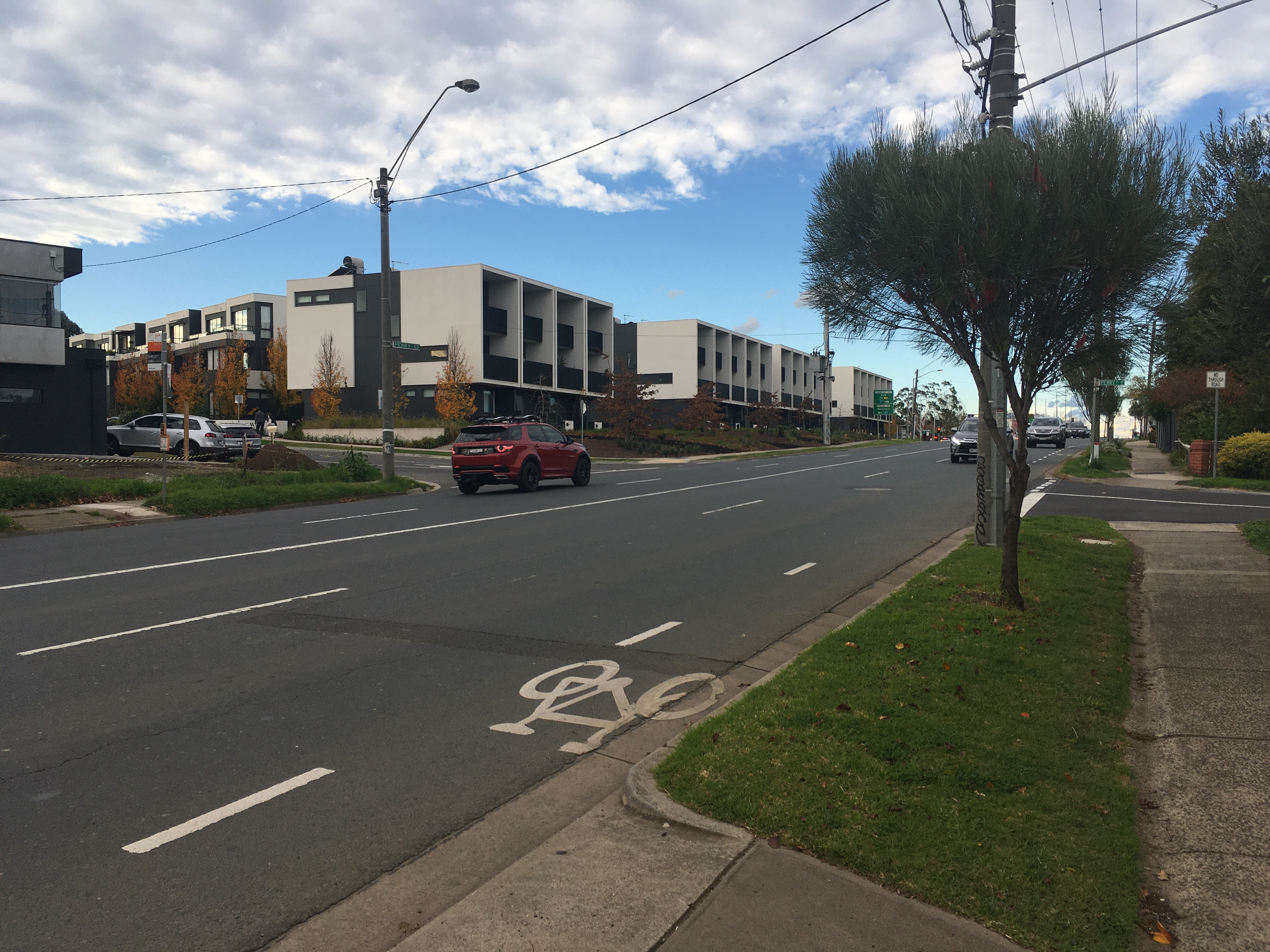
- Heidelberg Road, Alphington

- Interactive map of Alphington
- Coordinates: 37.780°S 145.023°E
- Country: Australia
- State: Victoria
- City: Melbourne
- LGAs: City of Darebin; City of Yarra
- Location: 7 km (4.3 mi) NE of Melbourne

Government
  - State electorate: Northcote
  - Federal division: Cooper

Area
  - Total: 2.8 km^{2} (1.1 sq mi)
- Elevation: 37 m (121 ft)

Population
  - Total: 5,702 (2021 census)
  - Density: 2,040/km^{2} (5,270/sq mi)
- Postcode: 3078
Suburbs around Alphington
Thornbury	Thornbury	Ivanhoe
Fairfield	Alphington	Ivanhoe
Fairfield; Kew	Kew	Kew East

Alphington (/ælfɪŋtən/ ALF-ing-tən) is a suburb in Melbourne, Victoria, Australia, 7 km (4.3 mi) north-east of Melbourne's Central Business District, located within the Cities of Darebin and Yarra local government areas. Alphington recorded a population of 5,702 at the 2021 census.

Alphington shares a postcode with neighbouring suburb Fairfield, and is bounded by the Yarra River in the south and the Darebin Creek in the east.

== History ==
Darebin Creek area is the traditional country of the Wurundjeri-willam people who are part of the Woiworung clan of the Kulin Nation, who are traditional owners of the country from west of Melbourne along to the Darebin Creek and to outer eastern Melbourne. For the Wurundjeri-willam people, the fertile Alphington region provided fresh water from the Darebin Creek and seasonal fish, tubers and shoots from water plants; while birds and animals provided clothing and food, trees and plants provided food and tools.

The genesis of Alphington was the Bridge Hotel and Darebin Creek Bridge on Heidelberg Road, both commenced in the 1840s, with a new stone arch bridge erected in 1864.

Alphington was named by Sir William Manning after his birthplace, Alphington in Devon, England. Alphington is a suburb in the English city of Exeter.

Alphington Post Office opened on 2 February 1858.

Alphington was originally part of the Jika Jika Parish, bounded by Rathmines Street to the west, Darebin Creek to the east, and the Yarra River to the south.

The character of Alphington East is dominated by detached housing, garden settings, Edwardian and inter-war houses. This area has little remaining industrial or commercial development and relied on easy access to railway lines and coach ways such as Heidelberg Road.

As with Richmond, most of the subdivision of this area arose in the boom era of the late 19th century but with only a few Victorian-era houses evident now.

The Yarra-side and hillside allotments could still, however, attract those gentlemen who owned a carriage. Hence when C.B. James and Percy Dobson released their Fulham Grange estate (the former Perry Brothers' orchards), they proclaimed that the acre lots on the Yarra were 'ideal for Gentlemen's Residences'. The St James Park estate, formed around Alphington St and Park Crescent, was also launched in the late Victorian-era.

Meanwhile, gas companies distributed their domestic gas supply over an ever wider area: the Northern Gas Co. was floated in 1887 and the Heidelberg Gas Co. commenced laying mains, in 1889, as the Heidelberg, Ivanhoe, Alphington and Fairfield Gas Co. Reticulated water was extended to Alphington in 1887. The bulk of housing development arose once efficient and cheap public transport was provided by the upgrade of the Heidelberg railway line in the Edwardian-era.

The Clifton Hill to Alphington railway line, isolated as it was from the main system, was built in 1883 but this was the only gesture from a Government which had been extending lines in every other direction across the Colony. It was not until 1889, near the end of the land boom, that a branch railway line was extended from Royal Park to Preston and later to Whittlesea, as well as across to the marooned 'Nowhere to Nowhere' line from Clifton Hill to Alphington. A new line was built from Clifton Hill to Princes Bridge in 1901 to allow more direct rail access from Alphington and Fairfield (as well as Collingwood, Abbotsford and West Richmond) to the growing City of Melbourne and its industrial heartland in Richmond and Collingwood. Hence it was the Edwardian-era that allowed the potential for houses to be built in the Alphington area, often in the Queen Anne or Federation Bungalow Styles.

This was followed by the short-lived catch-up house boom, after World War I, in the Californian Bungalow style when emerging use of the motor car allowed less residential density further from main centres of industrial and commercial employment.

The small commercial group at the Yarralea Street and Heidelberg Road corner is part of a village that once had a church, hall and church school, bakery (in the City of Darebin) and the nearby Tower Hotel as its key structures. The two-storey stone shop & residence and the old butcher's shop in Heidelberg Road are contemporary with the stone church and form the beginning of a commercial area that today reflects the key period of development in that area, as also reflected by the housing to the south, with its early 20th century shops.

== Parks and open space ==
Alphington has tracts of green open space, such as the Darebin Parklands and Alphington Park. The suburb also features the Latrobe Golf Club. The area around Alphington railway station contains a stand of river red gum trees, the oldest of which (closest to Platform 1) likely predates European settlement. These areas have been revegetated with indigenous plantings by local residents and the local Council beginning in the late 1990s and are now characterized by vigorous young Red Gum growth and the return of native fauna such as tawny frogmouths. Sightings of echidnas have been reported.

A notable location in the part of Alphington to the south of Heidelberg Road is the revegetated wetlands. This area abuts the Yarra River, and includes the disused modification to the river bank once referred to as the Alphington Swimming Pool.

The Melbourne Innovation Centre is located just to the north east of the railway station and adjacent to the shallow valley of the Darebin Creek. There is no pedestrian access along the train bridge over the creek.

== Industry ==
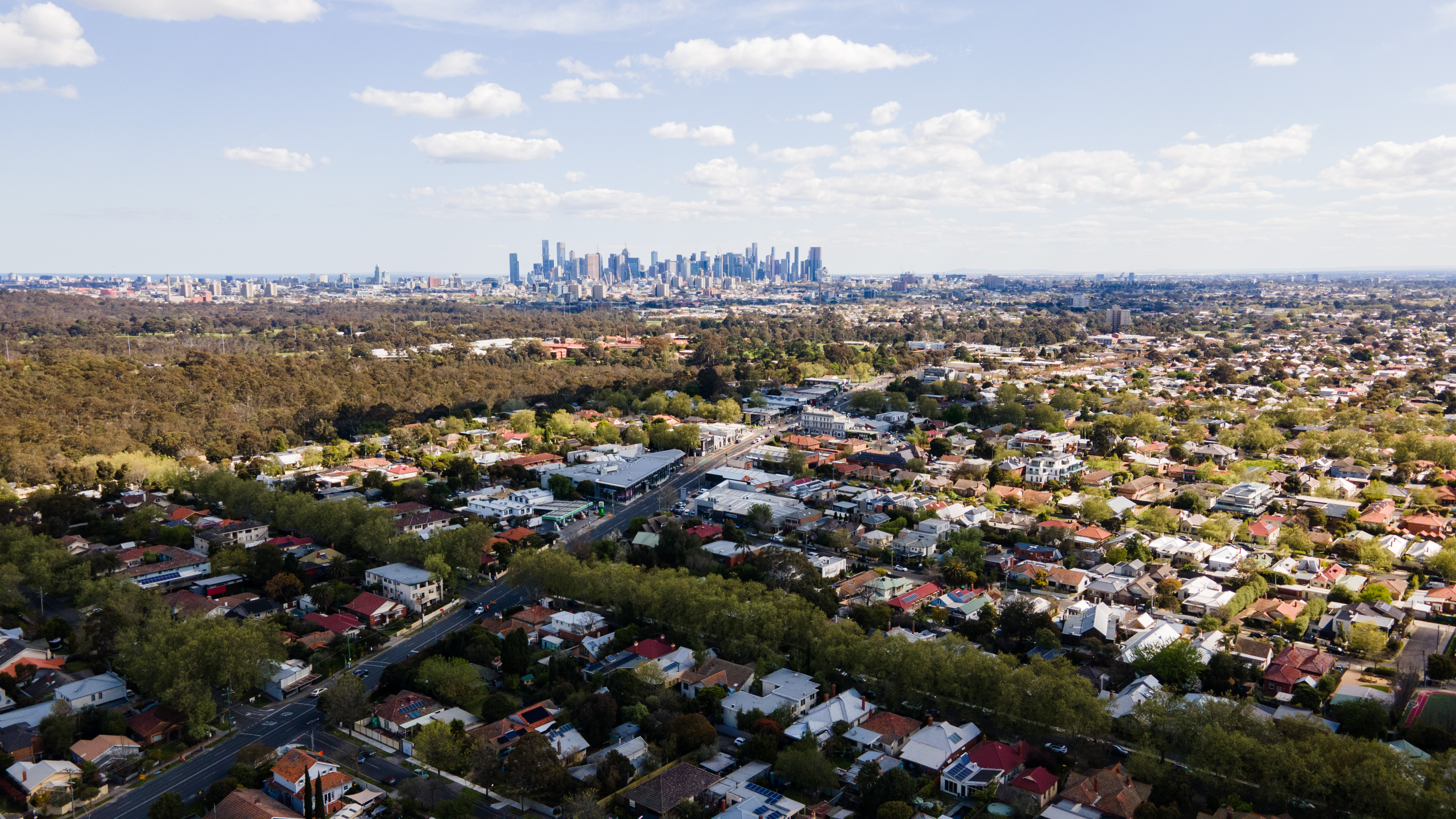
View above Alphington towards the Melbourne CBD

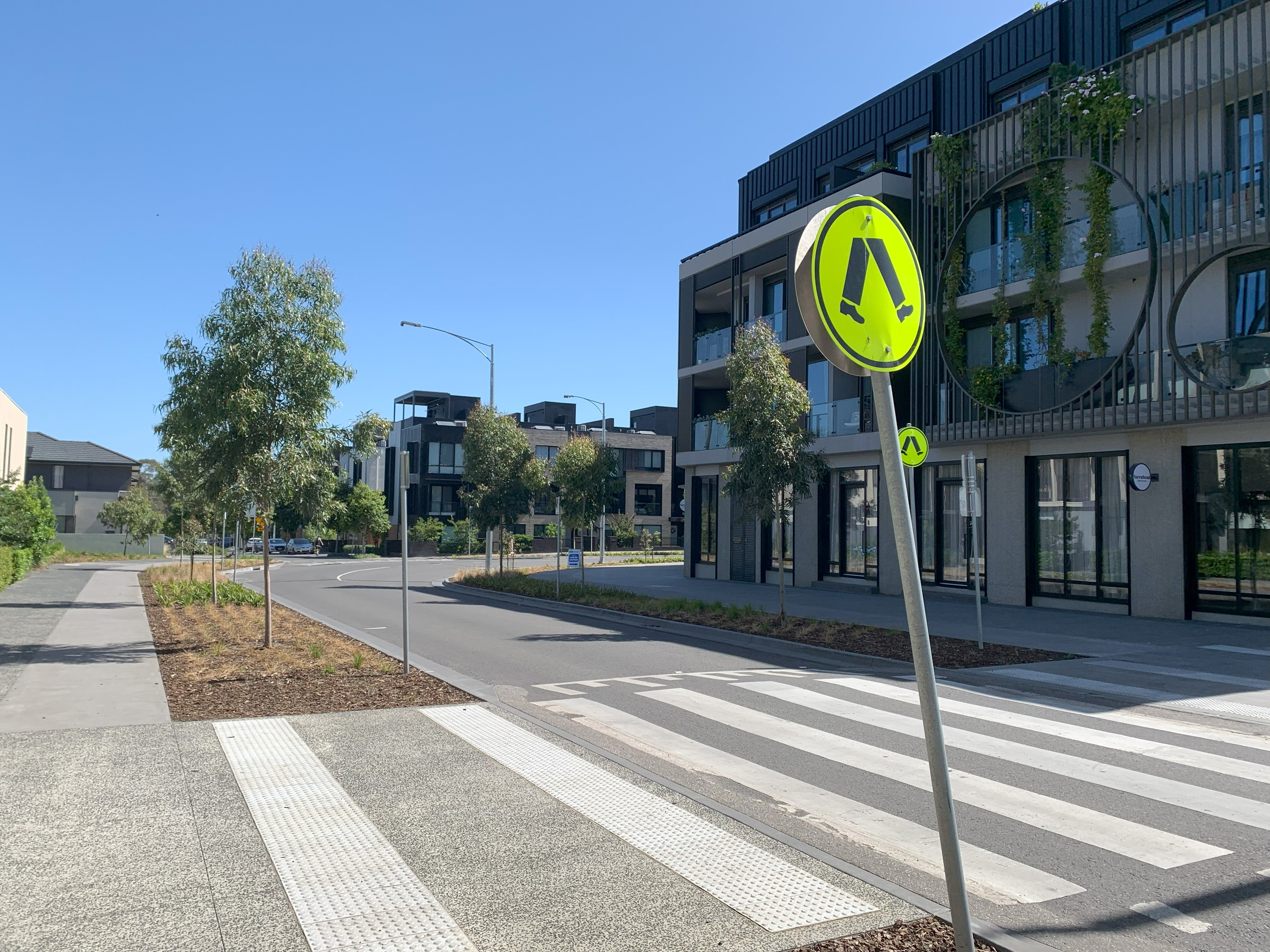
YarraBend housing development

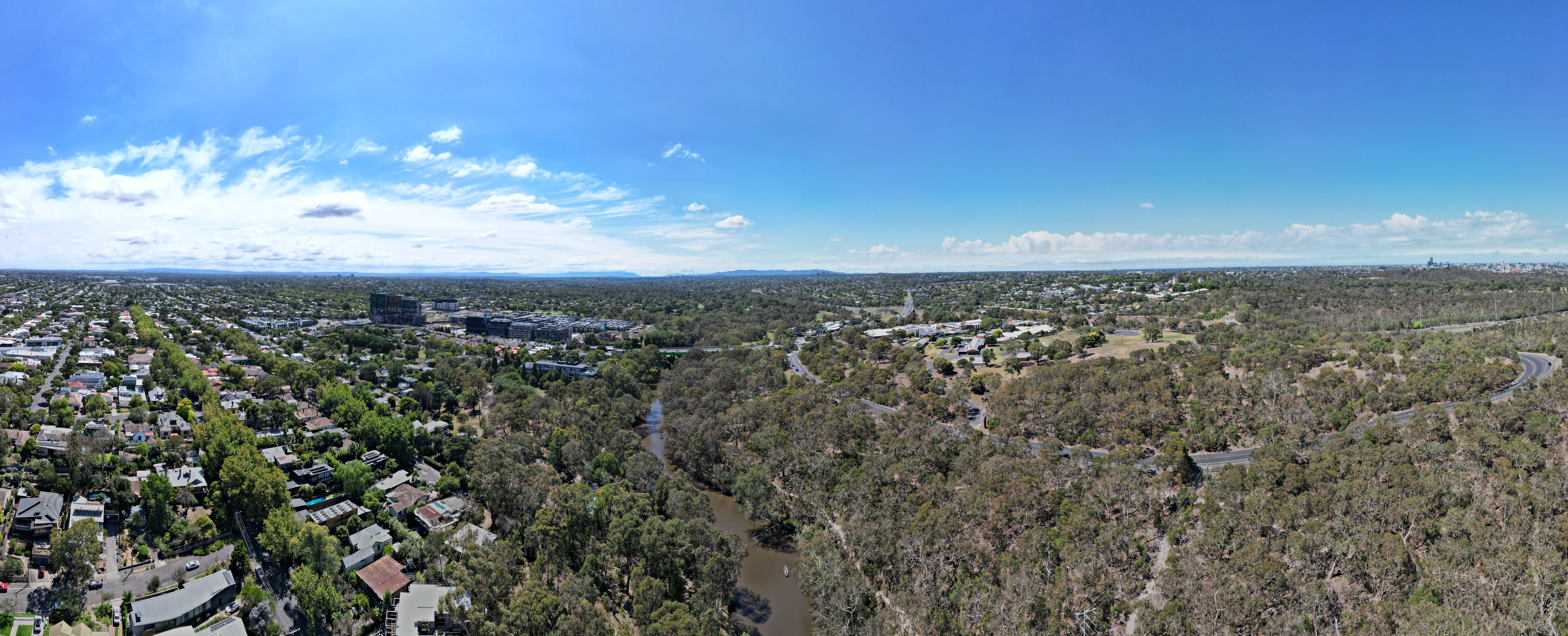
Alphington aerial panorama facing east to the Dandenong Ranges

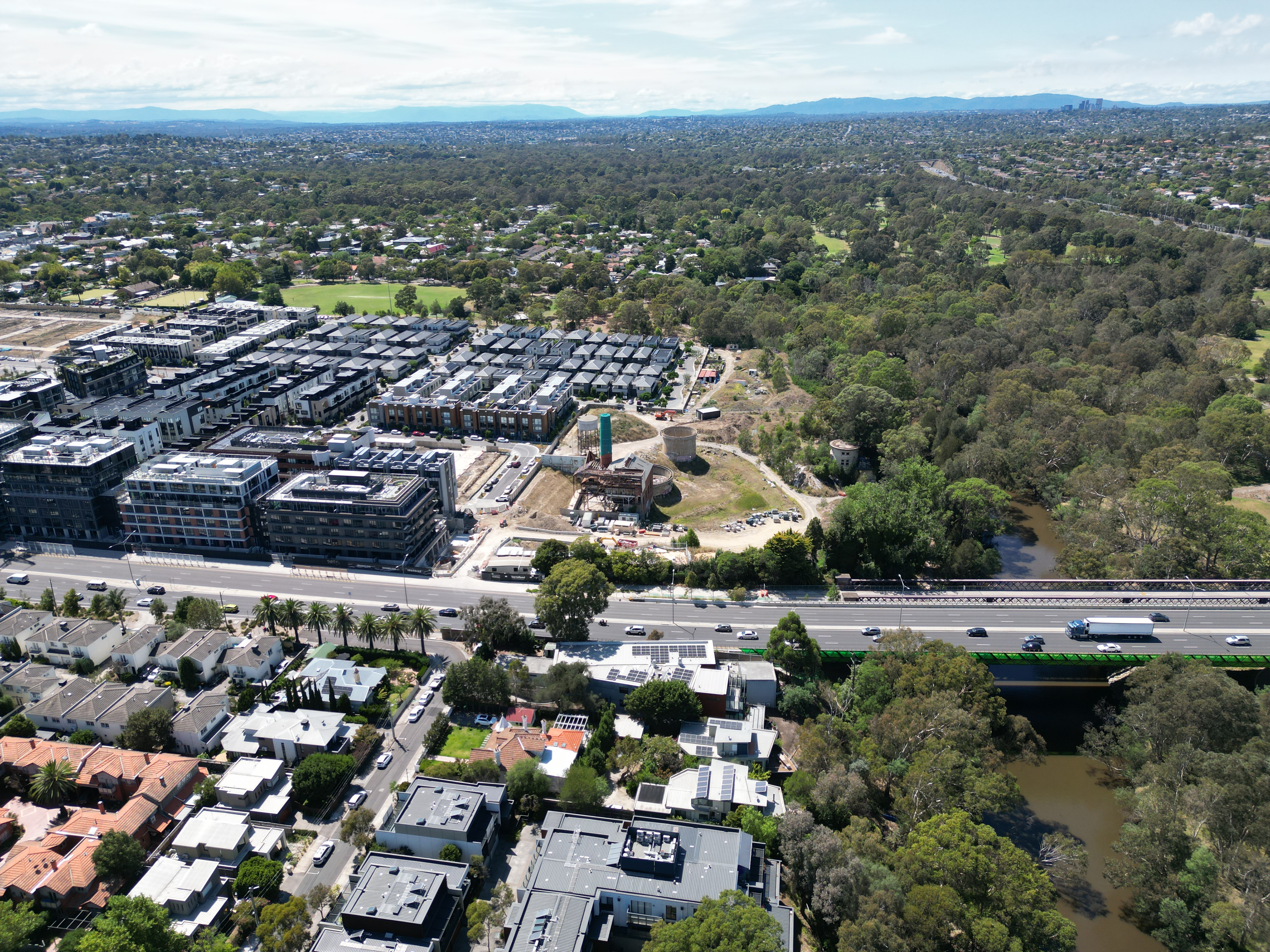
The old Alphington paper mill from above

Amcor, a major paper production plant, operated a Paper Mill in Alphington between 1919 and 2012, after which the land was sold to become a 16.5-hectare (41-acre) residential development. The mill was demolished in 2017.

Amcor had been found guilty of polluting Alphington's environment on at least three occasions; in 2001 for odour, in 2007 for discharging paper pulp into the Yarra and in 2008, Amcor was convicted for releasing oil into the Yarra from its Alphington plant and fined $80,000. In 2013, the company ceased operations at the Alphington plant.

An EPA air monitoring station can be found next to the railway station just to the north.

== Education ==
Local schools include Alphington Grammar School, Alphington Primary School, and St Anthony's Primary School. However, Alphington residents north of Wingrove Street are within the zone for Fairfield Primary School.

== Transport ==
=== Bus ===
Six bus routes service Alphington:

- 250 : Melbourne CBD (Queen Street) – La Trobe University (Bundoora Campus). Operated by Kinetic Melbourne.
- 350 : Melbourne CBD (Queen Street) – La Trobe University (Bundoora Campus) via the Eastern Freeway. Operated by Kinetic Melbourne.
- 508 : Alphington station – Moonee Ponds Junction via Northcote and Brunswick. Operated by Dysons.
- 510 : Essendon station – Ivanhoe station via Brunswick West, Moreland station, Thornbury and Fairfield. Operated by Kinetic Melbourne.
- 546 : Heidelberg station – Queen Victoria Market via Clifton Hill, Carlton and the University of Melbourne. Operated by Dysons.
- 609 : Hawthorn station – Fairfield via Kew. Operated by Dysons.

=== Road ===
The Chandler Highway runs from Heidelberg Road in Alphington, across a new six-lane bridge over the Yarra River. Its total length is less than 2 kilometres, leading to its claim as "the shortest highway in the world".

=== Train ===
One railway station services Alphington: Alphington, on the Hurstbridge line.

== Sporting clubs ==
- Parkside Football Club, an Australian Rules football team, competes in the Victorian Amateur Football Association and are based at Pitcher Park.
- Alphington Bowls Club, located in the north west corner of Alphington Park, was founded on 11 September 1921.
- Alphington Netball Club competes in the Banyule and Darebin competitions and has 19 teams across aged groups, from under 9s to Open.
- The Alphington Football Club (soccer) Blue Tongues play out of Alphington Park. Founded in 2003.
- The Northcote United Cricket Club is based at Alphington Park.
- The North Alphington Cricket Club (nicknamed NACCers) is a part of the Parkside Sports Club, based at Pitcher Park.
- Golfers play at the course of the Latrobe Golf Club on Farm Road, Alphington.
- The Parkside Netball Club was founded in May 2014, and since its creation it has quickly grown to 13 teams, including one open age team competing during the week.

== Notable residents ==
- Rick Amor – artist
- Julian Burnside – Queen's Counsel, barrister, human rights and refugee advocate, and author
- Sam Groth – former professional tennis player, current world record holder of world's fastest serve
- Paul Licuria – AFL player (Collingwood)
- Angie McMahon – singer-songwriter and musician. She won a Telstra competition in 2013 to open for Bon Jovi on the Australian leg of their Because We Can tour.
- Richard Minifie – First World War Fighter Ace
- Anthony Rocca – AFL Player (Collingwood)
- Lindsay Tanner – former federal MP for the Division of Melbourne
- Darcy Moore- AFL player

== Filming locations ==
The main shopping strip was used to film the 2003 Australian movie, Take Away, featuring Vince Colosimo and Stephen Curry. In 2011, the Australian television drama The Slap, based on the novel of the same name, was filmed on location in an Alphington house.

Bonds filmed their Show Your Glow ad in Parkview Road's last original house during September 2015.

== See also ==
- City of Northcote – Alphington was previously within this former local government area.
