= Burnley, Victoria =

Burnley
- Suburb
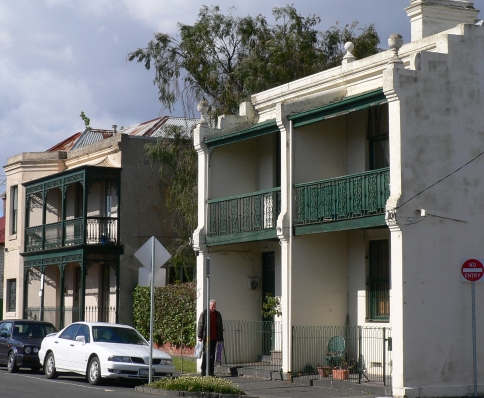
- Terrace housing in Burnley

- Interactive map of Burnley
- Coordinates: 37.825°S 145.012°E
- Country: Australia
- State: Victoria
- City: Melbourne
- LGA: City of Yarra
- Location: 4 km (2.5 mi) from Melbourne

Government
  - State electorate: Richmond
  - Federal division: Melbourne

Area
  - Total: 1.7 km^{2} (0.66 sq mi)
- Elevation: 16 m (52 ft)

Population
  - Total: 794 (2021 census)
  - Density: 467/km^{2} (1,210/sq mi)
- Postcode: 3121
Suburbs around Burnley
Richmond	Richmond	Hawthorn
Richmond	Burnley	Hawthorn
South Yarra	Toorak	Toorak

Burnley is an inner-city suburb in Melbourne, Victoria, Australia, 4 km east of the Melbourne central business district, located within the City of Yarra local government area. Burnley recorded a population of 794 at the 2021 census. It has historically been part of the larger Richmond area due to its proximity and small size.

Burnley has the Yarra River as its southern and eastern boundaries. The other boundaries are Burnley Park to the north and Park Grove along with the south end of Burnley Street to the west.

== History ==
The Kulin people were the first people to live in the Burnley area. According to the notes of Alfred Howitt, the area was known as Koϊ-wirip in Woiwurrung language, which refers to the ti trees. The scarred trees in Burnley Park such as the Corroboree Tree are a sign of Kulin use of the area.

In 1838 the area approximating Burnley's present open space lying in a loop of the Yarra River was reserved as the Survey Paddock. It is bisected by Swan Street (1880s), trisected by railway lines diverging at Burnley (to Hawthorn, 1861 and to Glen Iris, 1890), and skirted on its eastern edge by the Yarra Boulevard (1930s) and on its southern edge by the Monash Freeway (1962).

The area was named after William Burnley, pioneer land purchaser in Richmond, local councillor and parliamentarian.

Burnley was developed in the 1850s as part of the wider Richmond district as Melbourne expanded eastwards to the Dandenong Ranges. Industrial development followed in the 1860s with workers' housing established within walking distance of the many local factories manufacturing everything from clothing to pipe organs.

The Horticultural Society of Victoria was granted 12 ha. in the Survey Paddock in 1862 for experimental gardens, mainly for acclimatization of exotic fruits, vegetables and flowers. The site was taken over by the State Department of Agriculture in 1891. The balance of the Survey Paddock became Richmond Park, containing the Pic Nic railway station, east of the present Burnley station, as the entry to a landscaped pleasure ground.

Burnley's industrial area was in its south-west corner next to the river. Basalt quarries were worked south of Coppin Street. One of them has been opened up to the river by the cutting of a channel to improve stream velocity to clear upstream floodwaters from Kew. The quarry hole became a dock depot for silt-dredging craft, and the channel also resulted in the formation, mid-stream, of Herring Island. The Richmond Abattoirs were near the old quarries, and municipal dignity was improved with Barkly Gardens (1865).

There were two ferries across the river, one being the Twickenham ferry. It was replaced by the MacRobertson Bridge (1935).

On 22 January 1885, St Bartholomew's Anglican Church was opened after land had been granted by the Victorian Government in 1870.

In 1887, the first State primary school was opened; the primary school was demolished in the 1970s to become the Golden Square Bicentennial Park. A temporary primary school in Burnley Park closed in 1987. Quite near the site of the temporary school is a remnant dead tree, evidence of the traditional Aboriginal inhabitants. It may have been a marker tree for ritual events or a tree from which bark was taken for a canoe or shelter. Separated from these areas by the railway line is a section of Burnley Park set aside for travelling circuses and outdoor music events called Reunion Park.

Burnley Post Office opened on 21 March 1887.

In the southernmost part of the Survey Paddock, through which the freeway passes, there is a public golf course and sports facilities comprising the Kevin Bartlett Sporting and Recreation Complex. Kevin Bartlett was a Richmond footballer.

In 1991 the adjacent horticultural college celebrated its centenary, by when it was famed for the training of career horticulturists and as the metropolitan venue for demonstrations for amateur gardeners. In its grounds is an ornamental garden area of several hectares, among the best of Melbourne's passive recreation areas.

Following the construction of the CityLink road on its southern boundary, one its two tunnels was named for the suburb.

== Local landmarks ==
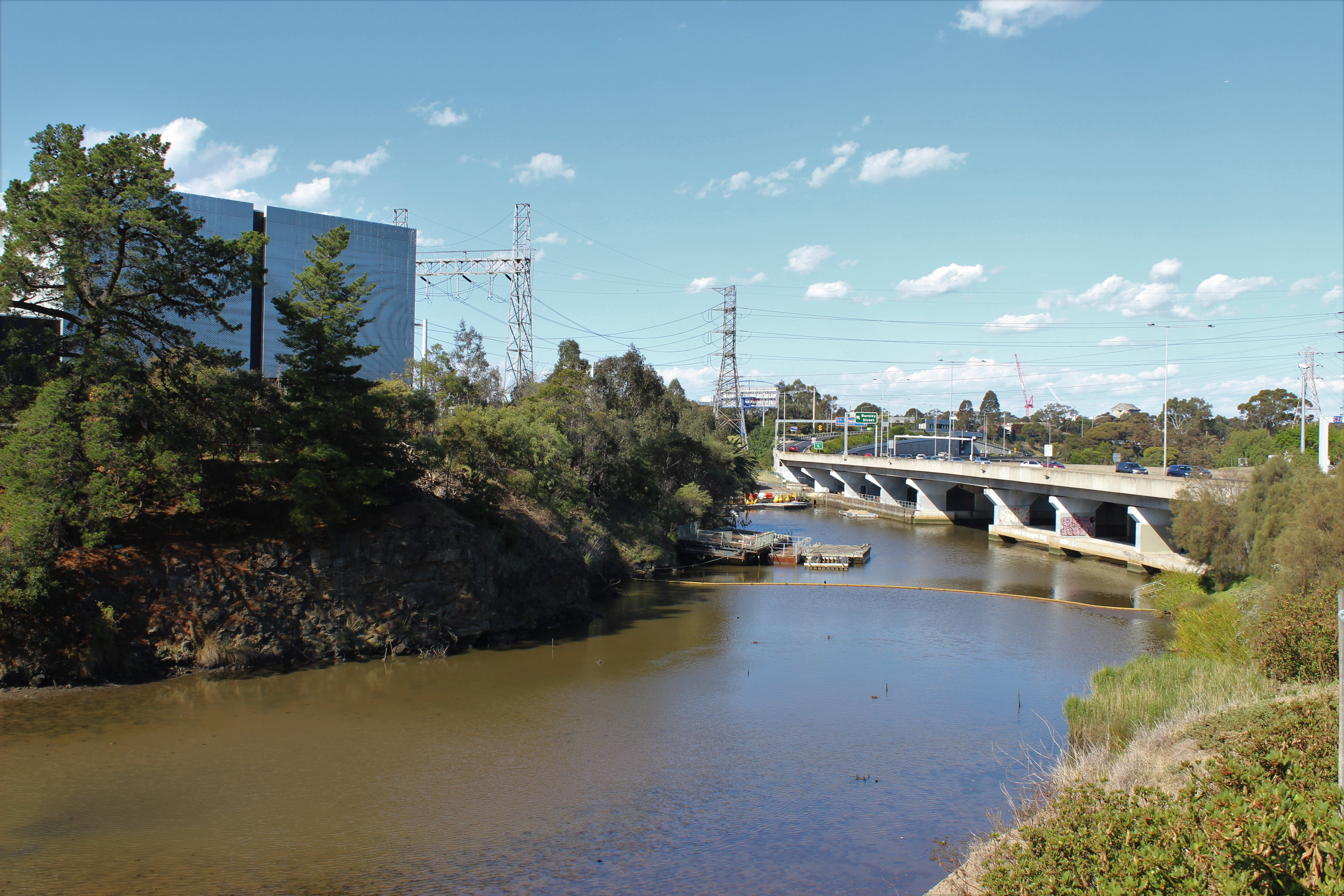
View of Burnley Harbour, created in the 1930s when a new channel was cut for the Yarra River.

With a large number of historic small homes in narrow streets, Burnley has a diverse range of residential architecture as well as many public buildings including churches, hotels, shops and factories including the former factory and workshop of the pipe organ building firm of George Fincham & Sons, Australia's most prolific pipe organ builder from the 1862 until the late 20th century. George Fincham established his business in Stawell Street, Burnley, in 1862.

Burnley has three major parks: Ryan's Reserve, on Swan Street, is a centre for tennis and netball; Golden Square Bicentennial Park is the former site of the Burnley Primary School, which was merged with Cremorne Primary School and Richmond Primary School; Burnley Park houses Burnley Oval, near Yarra Boulevard and Melbourne Girls College.

Kevin Bartlett Reserve (named after former Australian rules footballer Kevin Bartlett) houses a number of playing fields and a sporting complex.

Burnley Public Golf Course services local residents and other Melburnians.

== Education ==
Burnley is the home of the horticulturally focused Burnley campus of the University of Melbourne, which began as the Richmond Survey Paddock in 1850. It is best known by its longtime name Burnley College.

Melbourne Girls' College, a public school for girls also located in Burnley, uses the land of the former Richmond High School, which was the site of controversial protests in 1993 when it was closed by the Kennett Government.

== Sport ==
Burnley is home to Richmond Soccer Club which play in the Victorian State League Division 1. They play their home matches at Kevin Bartlett Reserve. Collingwood City Soccer Club are also locate at Kevin Bartlett Reserve.

== Industry ==
Burnley houses the studios of radio station 1116 SEN and until 2011, it was the home of television studios of GTV-9, on Bendigo Street. The GTV-9 site was re-developed by Lendlease to create new residences in 2013. A light industrial park opened in the early 2000s (decade), housing General Electric Australia and Amrad Pharmaceutical Research. In 2006, the headquarters of the Metropolitan Fire Brigade was built adjacent to the exit of the Burnley Tunnel.

More recently commercial business park Botanicca was constructed on Swan Street in the 2010s to house the head offices of David Jones and Country Road along with Harris Scarfe and Forever New. In early 2024, David Jones relocated its head office to Docklands.

== Demographics ==
In the 2016 census, there were 769 people in Burnley. 74.8% of people were born in Australia and 83.6% of people spoke only English at home. The most common responses for religion were No Religion 50.2% and Catholic 18.0%.

== Transport ==
Burnley is serviced by train, with the Burnley railway station located near the corner of Swan Street and Burnley Street and parallel with Madden Grove. Friday 19 December 2008 saw the station re-opened as a Premium station, staffed first train to last.

Burnley is also serviced by the tram route 70 along Swan Street, and Kinetic Melbourne bus route 603 to Brighton Beach.

Burnley gives its name to the Burnley Tunnel, which has an outbound exit in Burnley, leading to Barkly Avenue and Burnley Street. The final section of CityLink was opened in December 2000.

There is also an inbound/outbound entry from the Monash Freeway, at Yarra Bend Boulevard and another inbound entry at the Barkly Avenue, Gibdon Street and Twickenham Grove intersection.

== See also ==
- City of Richmond – Burnley was previously within this former local government area.
