= List of bridges in Melbourne =

This is a list of major bridges in Melbourne, Victoria, Australia:

- Bolte Bridge
- Charles Grimes Bridge
- Church Street Bridge
- Cremorne Railway Bridge
- Darebin Creek Bridge
- Evan Walker Bridge
- Flinders Street Viaduct
- Hawthorn Bridge
- Hawthorn Railway Bridge
- Hoddle Bridge
- Jim Stynes Bridge pedestrian bridge
- King Street Bridge
- MacRobertson Bridge
- Maribyrnong River Viaduct
- Montague Street Bridge
- Morell Bridge
- Princes Bridge
- Queens Bridge
- Sandridge Bridge
- Seafarers Bridge
- Spencer Street Bridge
- Swan Street Bridge
- Victoria Bridge
- West Gate Bridge

== See also ==
- List of bridges in Australia
