= George Cornwell =

British railway engineer

- Born: c. 1825; Cambridgeshire, England, UK
- Died: c. 1900; Melbourne, Victoria, Australia
- Spouse: Jemima Ridpath
- Engineering career
- Discipline: engineer
- Projects: Melbourne Grammar School, Hawthorn Railway Bridge, Jack's Magazine, Melbourne and Suburban Railway Victoria

George Cornwell (c. 1825 – c. 1900) was a British railway engineer and building contractor working in Melbourne, Victoria, Australia in the second half of the nineteenth century. Among his prominent works, were the Hawthorn Railway Bridge built in 1861, with a span of about 60 metres (200 ft), being one of the last major items of permanent way to be completed on the fledgling Melbourne and Suburban Railway. Under the name 'George Cornwell and Co.' Cornwell had previously been involved as contractor in many other major construction works including the Melbourne Grammar School, the Model School, Coppin's Haymarket Theatre, the Sunbury railway goods shed and other Melbourne and Suburban Railway works. Subsequently, he was a contractor on Parliament House, Albert Park Station, Jack's Magazine and the Wallaby Creek water supply.

Hawthorn Railway Bridge, Melbourne, built by George Cornwell

His work also extended to New South Wales, where he won the construction contract for the Wagga Wagga to Albury section of the Great Southern Railway on 14 February 1878, in partnership with F Mixner.

== Family and connections ==
Cornwell married in 1850 Jemima Ridpath. The family was wealthy and well connected. His eldest daughter Alice Ann Cornwell was born in 1852 and she married and then left John Whiteman MLA. She became independently wealthy due to investing in mines. She went to England and bought The Sunday Times newspaper. His youngest daughter Kathleen Clarice Louise Cornwell (1872–1954) was a prolific writer first married to the music critic Herman Klein, and her daughter, Denise Robins, and her granddaughter, Patricia Robins, also became popular novelists.

Cornwell, however, was also prone to arguments and litigation. In 1883, McColl, a 65-year-old Member of the Victorian Legislative Assembly, took him to court for alleged assault but the action was unsuccessful.
