= Crossings of the Yarra River =

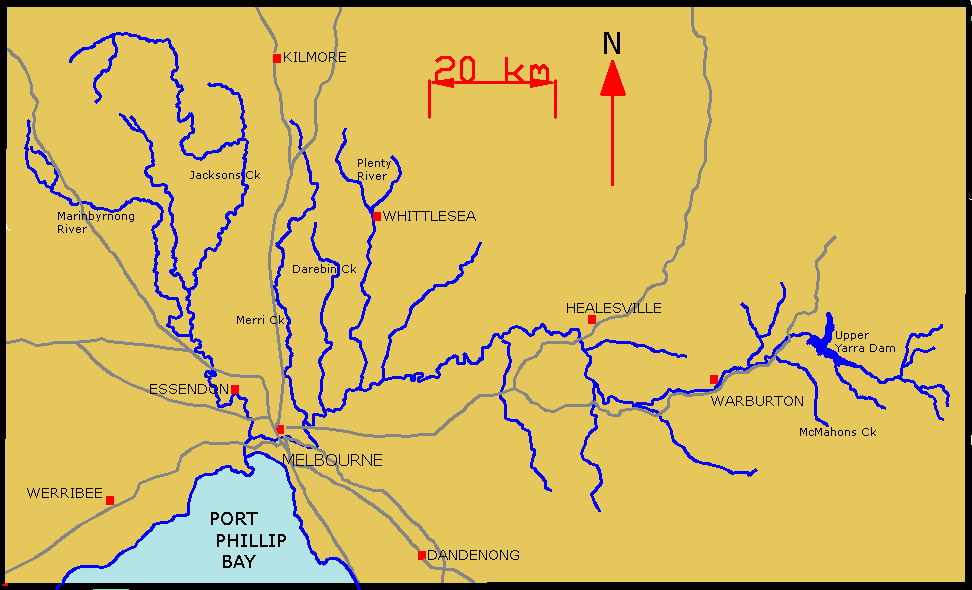
A map of the Yarra River and its tributaries

The Yarra River is a river in southern Victoria, Australia that flows through the city of Melbourne. Over the river's 242-kilometre (150 mi) length there are many structures that bridge the river.

== Crossings ==
The following is a partial list of structures have spanned the Yarra River in order of closest to the mouth of the river in Hobsons Bay.

Name	Image	Use	Year built	Location	Notes
Transmission line		Transmission		Spotswood; Port Melbourne	Transmits from Newport Power Station
Spotswood sewer tunnel		Sewer	189	Spotswood; Port Melbourne	Flooded in 1895 during construction, six deaths
West Gate Bridge		Vehicles	1978	Spotswood; Port Melbourne	Second longest bridge in Australia
Transmission line		Transmission		Docklands; Port Melbourne	Connects to Fishermans Bend Terminal; 56 m (184 ft) high
Bolte Bridge		Vehicles; Tollway	1999	Docklands; Port Melbourne	Tower height 140 m (460 ft)
Webb Bridge		Pedestrians	1986	Docklands	Built as part of the Webb Dock rail link; rails removed in the late 1990s; reconstructed at the south end in 2004 for pedestrian use
Charles Grimes Bridge		Vehicles	1975	Docklands	First bridge built in 1975, reconstructed in 2001; 3–4 m (9.8–13.1 ft) high
Seafarers Bridge		Pedestrians; Cyclists	2009	World Trade Centre; MCEC	
Spencer Street Bridge		Vehicles; Trams; Pedestrians	1930	Melbourne; Southbank	2–3 m (6 ft 7 in – 9 ft 10 in) high
King Street Bridge		Vehicles; Pedestrians	1961	Melbourne; Southbank	Southern end offramps altered 1997 for the development of Crown Casino; 2–3 m (6 ft 7 in – 9 ft 10 in) high
Queens Bridge		Vehicles; Trams	1889	Melbourne; Southbank	Originally the site of a timber footbridge built in 1860; 2–3 m (6 ft 7 in – 9 ft 10 in) high
Sandridge Bridge		Pedestrians; Cyclists	1888	Melbourne; Southbank	First bridge built 1853, second bridge built 1858, current bridge built 1888; former rail bridge for the Port Melbourne and St Kilda railway lines, first rail crossing of the Yarra, converted to pedestrian use in 2006
Evan Walker Bridge		Pedestrians	1992	Melbourne; Southbank	Renamed in 2015 in honour of Evan Walker
Princes Bridge		Vehicles; Trams	1888	Melbourne; Southbank	First bridge built 1844; second bridge built 1850; current bridge built 1888
Swan Street Bridge		Vehicles	1952	Melbourne	
Burnley Tunnel		Vehicles; Tollway	1997	Melbourne	Eastbound CityLink tunnel from Southbank to Burnley
Domain Tunnel		Vehicles; Tollway	1997	Melbourne	Westbound CityLink tunnel from Southbank to Richmond
Morell Bridge		Pedestrians	1899	Melbourne	Former roadway closed when CityLink built, now pedestrian bridge
Hoddle Bridge		Vehicles	1938	Cremorne	Former punt river crossing site, now carries Hoddle Highway
Cremorne Railway Bridge		Rail	1946	Cremorne; South Yarra	Carries Sandringham, Frankston, Pakenham and Cranbourne railway lines; first bridge built in 1860, current bridge built 1946
Church Street Bridge		Vehicles; Trams	1923	Richmond; South Yarra	First bridge built in 1857; current bridge built 1923
Transmission line		Transmission	-	Richmond; South Yarra	First of five crossings of the same line
Transmission line		Transmission	-	Burnley; Toorak	Second of five crossings of the same line
Transmission line		Transmission	-	Burnley; Toorak	Third of five crossings of the same line
MacRobertson Bridge		Vehicles	1934	Burnley; Toorak	First crossing was a punt opened in 1880, current bridge built 1934
Transmission line		Transmission		Burnley; Toorak	Fourth of five crossings of the same line
Heyington Bridge		Rail; Pedestrians	-	Burnley; Toorak	Glen Waverley railway line
Transmission line		Transmission		Burnley; Toorak	Fifth of five crossings of the same line
Gardiners Creek Bridge		Pedestrians; Cyclists	-	Burnley; Toorak	Carries Gardiners Creek Trail
Monash Freeway		Vehicles	1960s	Burnley; Toorak	Relocation of the river
Wallen Road Bridge		Vehicles; Trams	1882	Burnley; Hawthorn	Strengthened and widened in 1916 and 1938
Hawthorn Railway Bridge		Rail	1861	Burnley; Hawthorn	Alamein, Belgrave & Lilydale lines
Hawthorn Bridge		Vehicles; Trams	1861	Richmond; Hawthorn	Widened in 1890, renovated in 1931
Victoria Bridge		Vehicles; Trams	1884	Richmond; Kew	Widened in 1890; strengthened and widened in 1915; reconditioned and further widened in 1933
Walmer Street Bridge		Pedestrians; Cyclists	1892	Abbotsford; Kew	First bridge built in 1891; washed away one month after construction; current bridge is a whipple truss design; carries Main Yarra Trail
Collins Bridge		Pedestrians; Cyclists	2025	Abbotsford; Kew	Connects Gipps St to Main Yarra Trail and Yarra Boulevard; rebuilt in 2025
Johnston Street Bridge		Vehicles	1858	Burnley; Hawthorn	
Kane's Bridge, Studley Park		Footbridge	1928	Fairfield; Kew	Opened in 1928 to link Kew with the golf course; destroyed by floods in 1934; replaced by a single-span suspension bridge in 1935
Zig Zag Bridge		Demolished	1864	Fairfield; Kew	Originally built by John Young to transport stone for the building of Kew Asylum; later a pedestrian connection between the Yarra Bend Asylum and Kew Asylum; repaired in 1877; rebuilt in 1891; alterations in 1910 and 1926; demolished in 1929; earmarked for rebuilding; located in the Bellbird picnic area
Eastern Freeway		Vehicles	1977	Fairfield; Kew	Dual-carriageway concrete road bridges with 4-5 lanes; construction involved the relocation of the river
Fairfield Pipe Bridge		Pedestrians	1878	Fairfield; Kew	The original bridge was built in 1878 to carry water from the Yan Yean Reservoir to Kew; washed away in the floods of 1934; a new pipe bridge was built close to the site; the pylons of the original bridge were later demolished and no signs remain of the first pipe bridge
Old Chandler Highway Bridge		Pedestrians; Cyclists	1890; 2019	Alphington; Kew	1890 bridge carried the Outer Circle railway; then the Chandler Highway; and the Main Yarra Trail since 2019
Chandler Highway Bridges		Vehicles	2019	Alphington; Kew	Six-lane dual carriageway bridge carries the Chandler Highway
Footbridge		Pedestrians; Cyclists	-	Ivanhoe; Kew East	Main Yarra Trail
Burke Road		Vehicles	-	Ivanhoe; Kew East	
Transmission line		Transmission		Bulleen	First of eight crossings in Bulleen of the same line
Banksia Street		Vehicles	-	Heidelberg; Bulleen	
Transmission line		Transmission		Lower Plenty; Templestowe Lower	Seventh of eight crossings of the same line
Odyssey House; Finns Reserve		Pedestrians	-	Lower Plenty; Templestowe Lower	
Transmission line		Transmission		Lower Plenty; Templestowe Lower	Eighth of eight crossings of the same line
Westerfolds Park		Pedestrians; Cyclists	-	Lower Plenty; Templestowe Lower	Main Yarra Trail
Fitzsimons Lane		Vehicles	-	Eltham; Templestowe	
Transmission line		Transmission		Eltham; Templestowe	Separate line joining the above-mentioned line
-		Pedestrians	-	Eltham; Templestowe	
Transmission line		Transmission		Eltham; Templestowe	
Warrandyte Bridge		Vehicles	1952	Warrandyte; North Warrandyte	First bridge built 1861, current bridge built in 1952
The Heritage Golf Club		Vehicles	-	Christmas Hills; Chirnside Park	
Transmission line		Transmission		Christmas Hills; Chirnside Park	
Private road		Vehicles	n/a	Christmas Hills; Chirnside Park	
Healesville railway		Rail	-	Yering	
Melba Highway		Vehicles	-	Yering	
Proposed Melba Highway bypass		Vehicles	-	Yering	
Maxwells Road		Vehicles	-	Coldstream; Healesville	
Maroondah Highway		Vehicles	-	Coldstream; Healesville	
Healesville–Koo Wee Rup Road		Vehicles	-	Launching Place	
Former Healesville–Koo Wee Rup Road		Vehicles	-	Launching Place	
Don Road		Vehicles	-	Launching Place	
Private road		Vehicles	n/a	Launching Place	
Station Road		Vehicles	-	Wesburn	
Dee Road		Vehicles	-	Millgrove	
McKenzie–King Drive		Vehicles	-	Millgrove	
Mayer Bridge		Vehicles	1993	Warburton	Connects Warburton Highway to Dammans Road
Swing Bridge		Pedestrians	-	Warburton	Connects Story Reserve to Dammans Road
Brisbane Bridge		Vehicles	-	Warburton	Connects Warburton Highway to Dammans Road
Bramich Footbridge		Pedestrians	1993	Warburton	Re-opened on 30 May 1993
Redwood Bridge		Pedestrians	2000	Warburton	Constructed by 22 Construction Regiment, 4 Combat Engineer Regiment and members of the Warburton Advancement League
Signs Bridge		Vehicles	-	Warburton	Carries the Warburton Highway
Woods Point Road		Vehicles	-	East Warburton	
Hazelwood Road		Vehicles	-	East Warburton	
Cement Creek Road		Vehicles	-	East Warburton	
O'Shannassy Reservoir (access road)		Vehicles	-	East Warburton	
Peninsula Road		Vehicles	-	McMahons Creek	Culvert crossing dry river bed drained by Big Peninsula Tunnel
Big Peninsula Tunnel walking track		Pedestrians	-	McMahons Creek	Concrete stepping stones
Woods Point Road		Vehicles	-	Reefton	
Upper Yarra Dam		Dam	1957	Reefton	

- There are also a number of ferries that cross the Yarra at various points such as the West Gate Ferry and Herring Island Punt.

== See also ==
- Geography of the Yarra River
