= Cremorne Bridge =

Cremorne Bridge may refer to:

- Battersea Railway Bridge, properly called the Cremorne Bridge, across the River Thames in London, England
- Cremorne Railway Bridge, across the Yarra River, southeast of Melbourne, Australia
