= Wallen Road Bridge =

Heritage-listed road bridge in Melbourne, Victoria, Australia

- Coordinates: 37°49′12″S 145°0′55″E
- Carries: Wallen Road: Road; –
- Crosses: Yarra River
- Locale: Melbourne, Victoria, Australia
- Begins: Richmond, City of Yarra
- Ends: Hawthorn, City of Boroondara
- Other names: Richmond Park Bridge; Swan Street Bridge
- Preceded by: Hawthorn Railway Bridge
- Followed by: Monash Freeway bridges; Gardiners Creek Trail Footbridge

Characteristics
- Design: Girder bridge
- Material: Wrought iron; cast iron; bricks; steel
- Trough construction: Steel (1881-1936); Reinforced concrete (1938)
- Pier construction: Wrought and cast iron; steel
- Total length: 73 m (240 ft) (since 1938)
- Width: 15 m (50 ft) (since 1938)
- No. of spans: 5

Rail characteristics
- No. of tracks: 2 (tram)
- Track gauge: 1,435 mm (4 ft 8.5 in) standard gauge
- Electrified: 21 June 1916 (tbc)

History
- Designer: Temperley, Edwards and Jenkins
- Engineering design by: Public Works Department
- Constructed by: Johnson & Co Tyne Foundry
- Fabrication by: H. Wallace and Son Engineers (1916)
- Built: 1881–1882
- Construction cost: £5,493 (1882)
- Opened: August 1882; 144 years ago
- Rebuilt: 1916, 1936–1938
- Closed: 1936–1938 (for repairs)

Victorian Heritage Register
- Official name: Wallen Road Bridge
- Type: Registered place
- Designated: 14 June 2007
- Reference no.: VHR H0380
- Heritage overlay nos.: HO287; HO487
- Categories: Transport – Road; Transport - Tramways

Location
- Interactive map of Wallen Road Bridge

The Wallen Road Bridge is a girder bridge that crosses the Yarra River, five kilometres (3.1 mi) east of the city centre of Melbourne, Victoria, Australia. Completed in 1881, the bridge connects Swan Street in Richmond with Wallen Road in Hawthorn. The bridge carries vehicular traffic and Melbourne tram route 70.

Built between 1881 and 1882 on the traditional lands of the Wurundjeri people, the bridge was added to the Victorian Heritage Register on 14 June 2007 in recognition of its historical, scientific (technical), and aesthetic significance; and various elements were also added to a non-statutory list by the Victorian branch of the National Trust from 1964.

== History ==
The Wallen Road Bridge was designed by Temperley, George H. Edwards, and J. S. Jenkins and erected by the Johnson & Co Tyne Foundry, Melbourne between 1881 and 1882. Opened in August 1882 as the Richmond Park Bridge, eight months later than expected, and later sometimes known as the Swan Street Bridge until there was discussion over the construction of the Swan Street Bridge during the 1930s, the bridge was jointly funded by the Victorian government, the Borough of Hawthorn, and the City of Richmond as a transport link between the industrial inner suburbs and the developing eastern suburbs. A design competition was held with the condition that the cost would be limited to £5,000. The utilitarian engineering evident in bridges on this part of the Yarra contrasts with the aesthetic design of bridges along the Yarra closer to the city; and The Argus reported upon the opening of the bridge that "… efficiency is combined with economy, and it is by far the cheapest iron bridge yet erected over the Yarra."

The bridge was strengthened and widened by three metres (ten feet) in 1916 for use by electric trams operated by the Hawthorn Tramways Trust, a municipal undertaking comprising the councils of Melbourne, Richmond, Hawthorn and Camberwell. This was an extension of its tramway connecting Hawthorn and Camberwell to the city. The work involved an additional row of piers on each side carrying riveted mild steel girders of one-metre-deep (four-foot) web plates. The size and shape of the pier cylinders matched the original form along with similar angle steel cross bracing. The brick abutments and wing walls were also reconstructed. In this period the Hawthorn Tramways Trust erected a decorative steel gantry over the roadway to carry overhead wires for the trams. The gantry, along with those on the Hawthorn Bridge which it closely resembles, was manufactured by H. Wallace and Son Engineers.

During major flooding of the Yarra in December 1934 there were concerns that the bridge would be damaged beyond repair, following significant damage to the bridge's bricked western abutment. However, sandbagging to strengthen the bridge and efforts to fill the cavity were successful and after a short closure, the bridge was reopened to tram and vehicular traffic.

After being weakened by floods, between 1936 and 1938 the bridge was again strengthened. At the same time an additional span was created on the Richmond side to accommodate the Yarra Boulevard which was constructed as part of an unemployment relief scheme during the Depression. The length of the bridge increased by nine metres (thirty feet) to seventy-three metres (two hundred and forty feet); and its width increased by two metres (six feet) to fifteen metres (fifty feet). Other works included the replacement of the deck with reinforced concrete on a series of RSJ beams over the 1916 piers. New mild steel RSJ girders replaced the 1916 riveted steel girders and a new two-metre-wide (six-foot), cantilevered reinforced concrete footway built integral with the deck. The abutments and wing walls were again reconstructed in Hawthorn brick with the western abutment being relocated a further nine metres (thirty feet) from the river and a new pier of mild steel cylinders. Welding was used extensively for the new components and to reinforce the existing structure.

== Description ==
The bridge has cast iron and riveted wrought iron columns for the piers, riveted wrought iron box and plate girders for the main spans and a later 1938 reinforced concrete deck. The bridge has changed in appearance but retains its original basic form with the deep plate girder presenting a similar profile to the original box girders, the latter remaining as inner girders.

The ornamental tramway overhead gantry comprises A-framed steel uprights on either side of the road and a lightly curved main cross member of steel T-section. The internal corners are decorated with curved steel strap to form spandrels which are in filled with decorative circles. The centre point of the cross member is decorated with an acroterion of steel strap in similar style. Small cantilevers on the outside carrying power lines are braced with a triangular steel web pierced with circular holes. Electric lights have been attached to the gantry.

== See also ==
- Crossings of the Yarra River
- Hawthorn tram depot
- List of places on the Victorian Heritage Register in the City of Boroondara
- List of places on the Victorian Heritage Register in the City of Yarra
- Timeline of trams in Melbourne

Next crossing upstream	Yarra River	Next crossing downstream
Hawthorn railway bridge (railway)	Wallen Road Bridge	Monash Freeway bridges (vehicles); Gardiners Creek Trail Footbridge (pedestrians and cyclists)
