= Denise Robins =

English novelist (1897–1985)

- Born: Denise Naomi Klein; 1 February 1897; London, England^{1}
- Died: 1 May 1985 (aged 88); England
- Citizenship: British
- Occupations: Journalist, Novelist
- Spouse(s): (1) Arthur Robins (1918–1938) (2) O'Neill Pearson (1939–19??)
- Children: (1) Eve Louise Robins (2) Patricia Robins (a.k.a. Claire Lorrimer) (3) Anne Eleanor Robins
- Relatives: K. C. Groom (mother), Herman Klein (father); Adrian Klein (brother); Daryl Klein (brother)
- Writing career
- Pen name: Denise Chesterton, Eve Vaill, Anne Llewellyn, Denise Robins, Hervey Hamilton, Francesca Wright, Ashley French, Harriet Gray, Julia Kane
- Period: 1918–1985
- Genres: Gothic romance, Romantic novelist
- Website: deniserobins.com

Denise Robins (née Denise Naomi Klein; 1 February 1897 – 1 May 1985) was a prolific English romantic novelist and the first President of the Romantic Novelists' Association (1960–1966). She wrote under her first married name and under the pen-names: Denise Chesterton, Eve Vaill, 'Anne Llewellyn', Hervey Hamilton, Francesca Wright, Ashley French, Harriet Gray and Julia Kane, producing short stories, plays, and about 170 Gothic romance novels. In 1965, Robins published her autobiography, Stranger Than Fiction. At the time of her death in 1985, Robins's books had been translated into fifteen languages and had sold more than one hundred million copies. In 1984, they were borrowed more than one and a half million times from British libraries.

She was the daughter of the novelist K. C. Groom, and mother of romance novelist Patricia Robins. Some other members of her family are well-known artists.

== Biography ==
=== Personal life ===
Robins was born Denise Naomi Klein on 1 February 1897 in London, England, the daughter of Kathleen Clarice Louise Cornwell, who was also a prolific author who wrote under several names, and of her first husband, Herman Klein, who was a professor of music and journalist. Of Ashkenazi Jewish descent from Riga, he had been born in Norwich in 1856. Her mother Kathleen Clarice had been born in Melbourne, Australia, on 11 March 1872 and was the daughter of George Cornwell and his wife Jemima Ridpath, married in 1850. George Cornwell was a railway guard who became a successful gold prospector in Australia, operating several mines, and a notable building contractor. His eldest daughter, Alice Cornwell, born 1852, was spectacularly rich by the 1890s, returning to England and buying the Sunday Times newspaper.

Her parents had married in 1890. He had a daughter Sibyl Klein, from a previous marriage, and they had two sons: Adrian Bernard Klein (1892–1969) and Daryl Klein (1894), before the birth of Denise Naomi Klein (1897–1985). The childhood of Denise, Adrian and Daryl Klein was far from settled. Kathleen Klein began an affair with a Worcestershire Regiment officer called Herbert Berkeley Dealtry, who was much younger than her husband, and little than herself, and when Hermann Klein became aware of it he filed a petition for divorce, which was granted in December 1901. Kathleen then married Dealtry.

In 1905, the Dealtrys had some serious troubles in connection with the promotion of dog shows, which they had been drawn into by Kathleen's sister Alice Stennard Robinson, a leading member of the Ladies' Kennel Association (founded 1904) and the National Cat Club. Somehow, the money from the first dog show went missing, and the Dealtrys held a second show to pay the prize money owed on the first. After the second show, prize winners sued Dealtry, which led to his being declared bankrupt. The family then lived in America for a few years but, by 1908, Kathleen (or 'Kit') Dealtry was back in London, writing Christian novels. In 1918 she married for a third time and wrote at least three books as Mrs Sydney Groom.

Her eldest brother Adrian Bernard Klein also became a writer, he was an artist and wrote books on photography and cinematography. After serving as an officer in the British Army, he became a Fellow of the Royal Photographic Society and changed his name to Adrian Cornwell-Clyne.

Denise Naomi Klein married firstly Arthur Robins in 1918, a corn broker on the Baltic Exchange, they had three daughters, Eve Louise, Patricia Robins (a.k.a. Claire Lorrimer) who became another best-selling author, and Anne Eleanor. In 1938, the marriage ended in divorce, after Robins met O'Neill Pearson in Egypt, they married in 1939. However, like Agatha Christie, Robins continued to publish most of her books under her first married name.

=== Writing career ===
When she left school, Denise Klein went to work as a journalist for the D. C. Thomson Press, then became a freelance writer. She began to follow in her mother's footsteps when her first novel was published in 1924. Her serial What is Love? ran in The Star from December 1925 to February 1926. Her first play, Heatwave, written in collaboration with Roland Pertwee, was produced at the St James's Theatre, London, in 1929. As a writer of fiction, Denise Klein wrote under a variety of pen-names, including Denise Chesterton, Francesca Wright, Ashley French, Harriet Gray, Hervey Hamilton and Julia Kane. After marrying Arthur Robins, many of her books were written under her married name.

Robins had been writing fiction and getting it published for ten years when in 1927 she met Charles Boon, of Mills & Boon, and she entered her first contract with his firm the same year. Under the terms of this, she was to be paid an advance of thirty pounds for three novels, plus ten per cent terms. Her next contract, for a further six books, delivered an advance of twenty-five pounds for each book, while her third contract, for four more books, paid one hundred pounds for each, plus terms of twelve and a half per cent.

The colourful dust wrappers of Mills & Boon's books were becoming one of their biggest selling points. As an example, the cover of Robins's Women Who Seek (1928) showed a glamorous flapper checking her make-up.

Robins became not only Mills & Boon's most prolific writer, but also their best paid. A contract she signed in 1932 paid her £2,400 for eight books, which were those from Shatter the Sky (July 1933) to How Great the Price (June 1935). This was, however, her last work for the firm, as she was then 'poached' by a new publisher, Nicholson & Watson. Of this development, Arthur Boon wrote:

Denise Robins, one of our greatest authors, knew she could sell on her name more than other authors could. She was a superstar, and she knew it. Our problem was to find a way to satisfy the superstar. What could Mills & Boon offer a superstar? Superstars weren't grateful.

Robins gave her version of events in her autobiography:

Suddenly a young man named Ivor Nicholson came along – a clever, charming journalist who, with the wealth of Bernard Watson to back his new venture, launched a new publishing house – Ivor Nicholson & Watson. They wanted my name on their list. They tempted me with what was the biggest offer I had ever received from any literary quarter, a cheque for one thousand pounds, free, gratis, and for which I need do no work. It was merely for signing the contract! I did not go behind Charles Boon's back. I told him the facts. Unfortunately he was so annoyed by Ivor Nicholson's offer that he refused to compete and at once released me from my contract with his firm. Somewhat reluctantly I left my old publishers and became the new Nicholson & Watson 'star' author.

The first book Robins wrote for Nicholson was Life and Love (1935), which was launched with a huge publicity campaign. Robins's first photo opportunity was a visit to Liverpool to open a new lending library, and the slogan 'Robins for Romance' was posted on London buses.

In 1965, Robins published her autobiography, Stranger Than Fiction, summarised thus: "Apart from writing nearly two hundred novels that have brought her millions of fans throughout the world, Denise Robins led a remarkable life. Her unhappy childhood did not sour her belief in love. Here is her own story."

== Recognition ==
Robins was elected as President of the Romantic Novelists' Association in 1961.

== Legacy ==
During her long career as a writer, from about 1917 until her death in 1985, Robins certainly wrote more than one hundred and sixty books. She was dubbed by the Daily Graphic "the queen of romantic fiction". Joseph McAleer has described Robins as "the recognised mistress of the punishing kiss device.

At the time of her death in 1985, Robins's books had been translated into fifteen languages and had sold more than one hundred million copies. In 1984, they were borrowed more than one and a half million times from British libraries. Among her best-selling works were House of the Seventh Cross, Khamsin and Dark Corridor. In October 2011 the first dozen of her novels were released in e-book format. The novel Emily by Jilly Cooper has been compared to Robins' works.

== Bibliography ==
Some of her novels have been reedited under different titles or as Denise Robins

=== As Denise Chesterton ===
==== Novels ====
- Love's Broken Idol (1918)
- Christmas Roses (1942)
- What Wendy Did (1942)
- When Love Called (1942)
- Queen of the Roses (1943)

=== As Eve Vail ===
==== Novels ====
- Honour's Price (1929)

=== As Denise Robins ===
==== Novels ====
- Sealed Lips (1924) a.k.a. Illusion of Love (1924)
- The Marriage Bond (1925)
- The Triumph of the Rat (1927) a.k.a. Gilded Cage
- The Inevitable End (1927)
- Jonquil (1927)
- Desire is Blind (1928) a.k.a. Bride of Revenge
- The Passionate Flame (1928)
- White Jade (1928)
- Women Who Seek (1928)
- The Dark Death (1929)
- The Enchantress (1929)
- The Enduring Flame (1929)
- Heavy Clay (1929)
- Love Was a Jest (1929)
- And All Because (1930)
- It Wasn't Love (1930)
- Heat Wave (1930)
- Swing of Youth (1930)
- Crowns, Pounds, and Guineas (1931)
- Fever of Love (1931)
- Lovers of Janine (1931)
- Second Best (1931)
- The Wild Bird (1931)
- Blaze of Love (1932)
- The Boundary Line (1932)
- There Are Limits (1932) a.k.a. For the Sake of Love
- The Secret Hour (1932)
- Strange Rapture (1932)
- Gay Defeat (1933)
- Life's a Game (1933)
- Men Are Only Human (1933)
- Shatter the Sky (1933)
- Brief Ecstasy (1934)
- Never Give All (1934)
- Slave-Woman (1934)
- Sweet Love (1934)
- All This for Love (1935)
- Climb to the Stars (1935)
- How Great the Price (1935)
- Life and Love (1935)
- Murder in Mayfair (1935)
- Love Game (1936)
- Those Who Love (1936)
- Were I Thy Bride (1936) a.k.a. Betrayal
- Kiss of Youth (1937)
- Set Me Free (1937)
- The Tiger in Men (1937)
- The Woman's Side of It (1937)
- Restless Heart (1938)
- Since We Love (1938)
- You Have Chosen (1938)
- Dear Loyalty (1939)
- Gypsy Lover (1939) a.k.a. Romany Lover a.k.a. Chain of Love
- I, Too, Have Loved (1939)
- Officer's Wife (1939)
- Dust of Dreams (1940)
- Island of Flowers (1940)
- Little We Know (1940)
- Sweet Sorrow (1940) a.k.a. Forget That I Remember
- To Love is to Live (1940)
- Winged Love (1940)
- If This Be Destiny (1941)
- Love Is Enough (1941)
- Set the Stars Alight (1941)
- What Matters Most (1941)
- This One Night (1942)
- War Marriage (1942) a.k.a. Let Me Love
- The Changing Years (1943)
- Daughter Knows Best (1943)
- Escape to Love (1943)
- This Spring of Love (1943)
- War changes Everything (1943)
- Desert Rapture (1944)
- Give Me Back My Heart (1944)
- How to Forget (1944)
- Never Look Back (1944)
- Love so Young (1945)
- All for You (1946)
- Greater Than All (1946)
- Separation (1946)
- The Story of Veronica (1946)
- Forgive Me, My Love (1947)
- More Than Love (1947)
- Could I Forget (1948)
- The Feast is Finished (1948) a.k.a. The Lonely Heart
- Khamsin (1948)
- Love Me No More! (1948)
- The Hard Way (1949)
- To Love Again (1949)
- The Uncertain Heart (1949)
- Love Hath an Island (1950) a.k.a. The Cyprus Love Affair
- The Madness of Love (1950)
- Heart of Paris (1951)
- Infatuation (1951)
- Only My Dreams (1951) a.k.a. Only in My Dreams
- Second Marriage (1951)
- Something to Love (1951)
- The Other Love (1952)
- Strange Meeting (1952)
- The First Long Kiss (1953)
- My True Love (1953)
- The Long Shadow (1954)
- Two Loves (1954)
- The Unshaken Loyalty (1954)
- Venetian Rhapsody (1954)
- Bitter-Sweet (1955)
- Meet Me in Monte Carlo (1955)
- When a Woman Loves (1955)
- All That Matters (1956)
- Enchanted Island (1956)
- The Noble One (1957)
- The Seagull's Cry (1957)
- Chateau of Flowers (1958)
- The Untrodden Snow (1958)
- Do Not Go, My Love (1959)
- We Two Together (1959)
- Arrow in the Heart (1960)
- The Unlit Fire (1960)
- I Should Have Known (1961)
- A Promise is for Ever (1961) a.k.a. A Promise is Forever
- Put Back the Clock (1962)
- Mad is the Heart (1963)
- Nightingale's Song (1963)
- Reputation (1963)
- Moment of Love (1964)
- Loving and Giving (1965)
- The Strong Heart (1965)
- The Crash (1966)
- Lightning Strikes Twice (1966)
- O Love! O Fire! (1966)
- House of the Seventh Cross (1967) a.k.a. House by the Watch Tower
- Wait for Tomorrow (1967)
- Laurence, My Love (1968) a.k.a. Lawrence My Love
- The Price of Folly (1968)
- Love and Desire and Hate (1969)
- A Love Like Ours (1969)
- Sweet Cassandra (1970)
- Forbidden (1971)
- The Snow Must Return (1971)
- The Other Side of Love (1973)
- Twice Have I Loved (1973)
- Dark Corridor (1974)
- Australian Opal Safari (1974)
- Come Back, Yesterday (1976)
- Love's Triumph (1983)
- Masquerade of Love (1985)

==== Omnibus ====
- Love Poems, and others (1930)
- One Night in Ceylon, and others (1931)
- Love, Volume I (1980)
- Love, Volume II: To Love is to Live / You Have Chosen / The Changing Years (1980)
- Love, Volume III: Lightning Strikes Twice / Forbidden / A Love Like Ours (1980)
- Love, Volume IV : Loving and Giving / The Noble One / Brief Ecstasy (1980)
- Love, Volume V: The Cyprus Love Affair / The Wild Bird / Shatter the Sky / The Unlit Fire (1980)
- Love, Volume VI: The Other Side of Love / Climb to the Stairs / Sweet Cassandra (1980)
- Love, Volume VII: Gypsy Lover / The Strong Heart (1980)
- Love, Volume VIII: Those Who Love / Arrow in the Heart (1980)
- Love, Volume IX (1980)
- Love, Volume X: Strange Rapture / A Promise is for Ever (1980)
- Love, Volume XI (1981)
- Love, Volume XII (1981)
- Love, Volume XIII (1981)
- Love, Volume XIV (1981)
- Love, Volume XV (1981)
- Love, Volume XVI (1981)

==== Collections ====
- Heat Wave... (1930) (with Roland Pertwee)
- Tree Fairies... (1945) (with Franke Rogers)
- Light the Candles... (1957) (with Michael Pertwee)
- Woman's Weekly Fiction Series: Volume 4, Number 7 (1977) (with Rachel Murray)
- Woman's Weekly Fiction Series: Volume 5, Number 2 (1978) (with Rachel Murray)
- Woman's Weekly Fiction Series: Volume 7, Number 12 (1980) (with Joanna Logan)
- Woman's Weekly Fiction Series: Volume 7, Number 13 (1980) (with Pat Lacey)
- Woman's Weekly Fiction Series: Volume 7, Number 21 (1980) (with Joanna Logan)
- Woman's Weekly Images of Love: Volume 10, Number 20 (1983) (with Briony Tedgle)
- Woman's Weekly Images of Love: Volume 5, Number 6 (1988) (with Rachel Murray)

==== Anthologies edited ====
- The World of Romance (1964)

==== Autobiography ====
- Stranger Than Fiction (Hodder & Stoughton, 1965)

=== As Hervey Hamilton ===
==== Novels ====
- Family Holiday (1937)
- Figs in Frost (1946)

=== As Francesca Wright ===
==== Novels ====
- The Loves of Lucrezia (1953) a.k.a. Lucrezia (reedited as Denise Robins)
- She Devil (1970) Jezebel (reedited as Denise Robins)

=== As Ashley French ===
==== Novels ====
- Once is Enough (1953)
- The Bitter Core (1954)
- Breaking Point (1956)

=== As Harriet Gray ===
==== Fauna Trilogy ====
1. Gold for the Gay Masters (1954)
2. Bride of Doom (1956) a.k.a. Bride of Violence (1957)
3. The Flame and the Frost (1957)
- Fauna (omnibus)

==== Single Novels ====
- Dance in the Dust (1959)
- My Lady Destiny (1961)

=== As Julia Kane ===
==== Novels ====
- Dark, Secret Love (1962)
- The Sin Was Mine (1964)
- Time Runs Out (1965)

== See also ==
- List of best-selling fiction authors
