= MacRobertson Bridge =

Road bridge in Melbourne, Victoria, Australia

- Coordinates: 37°49′50″S 145°00′45″E
- Carries: Grange Road; (Vehicles, pedestrians)
- Crosses: Yarra River; Monash Freeway; Main Yarra / Capital City trails
- Locale: Melbourne, Victoria, Australia
- Begins: Toorak (south)
- Ends: Burnley (north)
- Named for: Sir Macpherson Robertson (MacRobertson's)
- Preceded by: Heyington Rail Bridge
- Followed by: Church Street Bridge

Characteristics
- Design: Truss bridge
- Material: Steel
- Pier construction: Concrete
- No. of spans: 2
- No. of lanes: 4; (2 in each direction)

History
- Opened: 31 October 1934; 91 years ago
- Rebuilt: 1969; 1997

Location
- Interactive map of MacRobertson Bridge

The MacRobertson Bridge is a truss bridge across the Yarra River and the Monash Freeway that carries Grange Road from Toorak on the south bank into Burnley, in Melbourne, Victoria, Australia.

== History ==
The first river crossing at the site was Twickenham Ferry, which conveyed passengers and was founded by waterman, Jesse Barrow, in 1880. It was named for the Twickenham Ferry in London. The ferry survived until 1934, when it was replaced by the MacRobertson Bridge, financed by philanthropist and confectioner, Sir Macpherson Robertson, as part of a A£100,000 gift to the celebrate the centenary of European settlement in Victoria.

The bridge was opened on 31 October 1934, although a plaque on the bridge places this date as 5 November in the same year. When built the bridge was one of two bridges in the world to be the first to use welded steel trusses.

When built, the bridge spanned the Yarra River. However, in 1967 the South Eastern Arterial was built, running under the northernmost span. In 1997, minor upgrades were made to the bridge when the freeway was widened as part of the CityLink project.

== Description ==
The MacRobertson Bridge is a steel truss bridge that crosses the Yarra River. It features two spans supported by concrete piers, each with two arched openings. The Monash Freeway passes beneath the northern span. At each end of the bridge, rendered pillars and low walls mark the entrances from Richmond and South Yarra. Four additional pillars, two on each side, are positioned along the bridge. These square pillars taper upwards and sit on stepped Art Deco bases, topped with decorative cast-iron and glass lanterns.

The Main Yarra Trail and the Capital City Trail pass underneath the northern and southern abutments.

== See also ==
- Crossings of the Yarra River

Next bridge upstream	Yarra River	Next bridge downstream
Heyington Rail Bridge (railway)	MacRobertson Bridge	Cremorne railway bridge (vehicles; pedestrians; cyclists)
