= Charles Klein (playwright) =

American dramatist

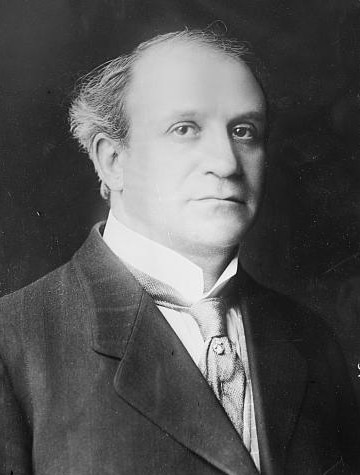
- Klein in 1907
- Born: January 7, 1867; London, England, U.K.
- Died: May 7, 1915 (aged 48); RMS Lusitania, Atlantic Ocean
- Occupations: Playwright, actor
- Spouse: Lillian Gottlieb (m. 1888)
- Children: 2

Charles Klein (January 7, 1867 – May 7, 1915) was an English-born playwright and actor who emigrated to America in 1883. After moving to New York City in 1883, Klein began acting. He began writing by 1890, soon working for producer Charles Frohman. Among his works was the libretto of John Philip Sousa's operetta, El Capitan (1896). He wrote melodrama and dramatic plays in the first 15 years of the 20th century.

Klein's talented siblings included composer Manuel, actor Alfred, and critic Herman Klein. He drowned during the sinking of the RMS Lusitania in 1915.

== Biography ==
Klein was born in London, England, to Hermann Klein and his wife Adelaide (née Soman). Apparently, the elder Klein emigrated from Riga, Latvia. Once in Norwich, Hermann became a professor of foreign languages at the King Edward VI Grammar School, and Adelaide taught dance. The younger Klein's five brothers included Max, a violinist; Manuel, a composer; Herman, a music critic and music teacher; Alfred, an actor; and Philip. They had a sister, Adelaide. He was educated at North London College.

Klein moved to New York City in 1883 and began his theatrical career by appearing in Little Lord Fauntleroy and other juvenile roles such as The Messenger from Jarvis Section and The Romany Rye. He married actress Lillian Gottlieb in Manhattan on July 10, 1888. They had two sons, Philip Klein, a screenwriter and producer (1888–1935), and John V. Klein (born 1908).

Klein first wrote for the theater in 1890, when he was commissioned to revise The Schatchen, in which he was then appearing. This was followed by a collaboration with Charles Coote on A Mile a Minute (1890). Nine of his early works were financed by a New York tailor, J. B. Doblin; these included The District Attorney and the libretto to John Philip Sousa's best remembered and most revived operetta, El Capitan, premiered in 1896. He came into prominence as a dramatist in 1897 with the Charles Frohman production of Heartsease, of which he was co-author with Joseph I. C. Clarke, which played long seasons and annual revivals for seven years, starring Henry Miller. For a time he was play censor for Frohman; meanwhile, he wrote another success, The Hon. John Grigsby for Sol Smith Russell.

Klein's melodramas were among the most successful of the first decade of the twentieth century, primarily because of their focus on themes of contemporary life in the United States. In The Auctioneer (1901) and The Music Master (1904), actor David Warfield had great successes. Klein's best-regarded drama, The Lion and the Mouse (1905), was prompted by a visit to the U.S. Senate. The story concerns a young woman taking on a powerful business tycoon. One of the corporate figures in the play was made to look like one of John D. Rockefeller's partner H. H. Rogers. His 1909 play, The Third Degree was adapted for film more than once.

Klein died, along with Frohman, during the sinking of the RMS Lusitania in 1915, at the age of 48.

== Selected plays ==
- A Mile a Minute (1890)
- By Proxy (1892)
- The District Attorney (1895)
- El Capitan (1896)
- Two Little Vagrants (1896)
- Heartsease (1897)
- The Charlatan (1898)
- A Royal Rogue (1900)
- The Auctioneer (1901)
- The Hon. John Grigsby (1902)
- Mrs. Pickwick (1903)
- Red Feather (1903, opera libretto)
- The Music Master (1904)
- The Lion and the Mouse (1905)
- The Daughters of Men (1906)
- The Step-Sister (1907)
- The Third Degree (1908) (In London this was titled "Find the Woman")
- The Next of Kin (1909)
- The Gamblers (1910)
- Maggie Pepper (1911)
- The Outsiders (1911)
- The Ne'er Do Well (1912)
- Potash and Perlmutter (1913)
- The Money Makers (1914)
