= K. C. Groom =

British writer

- Born: Kathleen Clarice Louise Cornwell; 11 March 1872; Melbourne, Australia
- Died: 29 April 1954 (aged 82); Hove, Sussex, England
- Occupations: Novelist, screenwriter
- Spouse(s): Herman Klein (1890–1901), Herbert Arthur Berkeley Dealtry (1902–19??), Sydney H. Groom (1918–19??)
- Children: Adrian Bernard Klein (1892–1969), Daryl Klein (1894–19??), Denise Naomi Klein (1897–1985)
- Relatives: Patricia Robins (granddaughter)
- Writing career
- Pen name: Clarice Klein, Kit Dealtry, C. Groom, Mrs. Sydney Groom, K. C. Groom
- Period: 1895–1952
- Genre: romance

Kathleen Clarice Groom (née Cornwell; 11 March 1872 – 29 April 1954) was a British writer of short-stories and novels from 1907 to 1952, she signed under different pen names: Clarice Klein, Kit Dealtry, C. Groom, Mrs. Sydney Groom, and K. C. Groom (playing with her different names and surnames).

She started a dynasty of popular writers; her eldest son Adrian Bernard Klein, changed his name to Adrian Cornwell-Clyne, and became an artist, who wrote books on photography and cinematography, her daughter Denise Naomi Klein also followed in her footsteps and became the popular romance writer Denise Robins, who was the first president of the Romantic Novelists' Association (1960–1966), and her granddaughter Patricia Robins (a.k.a. Claire Lorrimer), who is Denise Robins' daughter, is also a popular romance writer.

== Biography ==
=== Personal life ===
Groom was born Kathleen Clarice Louise Cornwell on 11 March 1872 in Melbourne, Australia, the daughter of Jemima Ridpath, and her husband George Cornwell, married in 1850.

On 19 February 1890, at 17, Kathleen Clarice became the second wife of Herman Klein (1856–1934), an English musical author, teacher and critic, who was 16 years older than she was. He had a daughter Sibyl Klein, from a previous marriage, and they had two sons: Adrian Bernard Klein (1892–1969) and Daryl Klein (1894) and a daughter Denise Naomi Klein (1897–1985). During her marriage with Klein, she began an affair with a young man, Herbert Arthur Berkeley Dealtry (1878–1915), who was a Worcestershire Regiment officer. When Herman Klein became aware of it he filed a petition for divorce, which was granted in December 1901. After the divorce Kathleen Clarice married with Dealtry in 1902. The marriage was going through financial difficulties and Dealtry had to declare bankruptcy in 1905, and they left for America with her daughter, Denise Naomi.

Some years later, Kathleen Clarice returned to London, and in 1918, she married for a third time with Sydney H. Groom, while her daughter Denise married for the first time and also started to write.

Kathleen Clarise started a saga of popular writers; her eldest son Adrian Bernard Klein, changed her name to Adrian Cornwell-Clyne, and became an artist, who wrote books on photography and cinematography, her daughter Denise Naomi Klein also followed in her footsteps and became the popular romance writer Denise Robins, who was the first president of the Romantic Novelists' Association (1960–1966), and her granddaughter Patricia Robins (a.k.a. Claire Lorrimer), who is Denise Robin's daughter, is also a popular romance writer.

Kathleen Clarise died in the Hove area, Brighton on 29 April 1954, aged 82.

=== Writing career ===
Kathleen Clarise started writing very young short stories; later wrote several serial thrillers for a Scottish newspaper. She wrote several short stories in Magazines and novels under different pseudonyms (playing with her different names and surnames). She is known as a prolific writer and screenwriter, but it is difficult to know how many pennames she used and how many books she wrote. She wrote as Kit Dealtry (her second married name) at least four short stories by the All-Story Magazine (1907–1908) and two novels (1908–1909). As C. Groom (her third married name), she wrote at least two novels (1918–1919). She signed at least four novels as Mrs. Sydney Groom (1920–1924). And some of her latest tree novels were signed as K. C. Groom (1947–1952).

== Bibliography ==
=== As Clarice Klein ===
==== Short story collection ====
- The Paving of Hell (Perth, Scotland: Cowan & Co., 1895) and (London: Dean & Co., 1895)

=== As Kit Dealtry ===
==== Short stories in magazines ====
- "The Voice in the Dark" in The All-Story Magazine (1907/May)
- "The Cipher Skull" in The All-Story Magazine (1907/Aug)
- "Shadowed" in The All-Story Magazine (1908/Feb)
- "Pearls and Perfidy" in The All-Story Magazine (1908/Dec)

==== Novels ====
- Under the Mistletoe Bough (1908)
- Ill-Gotten Gain (1909)

=== As C. Groom ===
==== Novels ====
- Love in the Darkness (1918)

=== As Mrs. Sydney Groom ===
==== Novels ====
- Shadows of Desires (1919)
- The Mystery of Mr Bernard Brown (1920)
- Greatheart (1921)
- The Knight Errant (1922)
- Sylvia Shale, Detective (1924)

=== K. C. Groom ===
==== Novels ====
- Phantom Fortune (1945)
- The Folly of Fear (1947)
- The Recoil (1952)

== See also ==
- List of people with surname Groom
