= Alice Cornwell =

British industrialist and publisher (1852–1932)

Alice Ann Cornwell
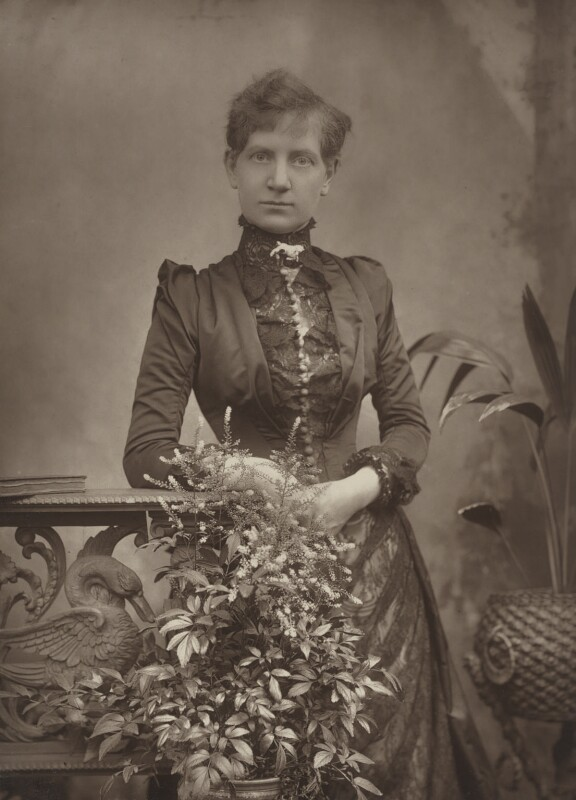
- Born: 1 January 1852; West Ham
- Died: 7 January 1932 (aged 80); Hove
- Other names: Alice Robinson, Alice Whiteman
- Education: Royal Academy of Music
- Occupations: mine and newspaper owner
- Spouses: John Whiteman; "Phil" Robinson

Alice Ann Cornwell (1 January 1852 – 7 January 1932) was a British goldmining industrialist and newspaper proprietor. She made her fortune from gold and floated her company on the London Stock Exchange. She was a confident business person investing in several companies including owning the Sunday Times.

== Life ==
Cornwell was born in West Ham in 1852 to Jemima and George Cornwell. She and her family emigrated to New Zealand when she was nine. Her father was an engineer.

Her first marriage was to the much older John Whiteman, a politician and publican. This marriage resulted in a legal separation before she left for England, but it was not ended until Whiteman died.

Her fortune was made when she returned from England to Australia after education at the Royal Academy of Music. Her father was a successful engineer who was prospecting but not making a profit. Cornwell studied his ground and convinced others that a major find lay beneath his land. Shafts were created where she had indicated and gold was reputedly found within 30 centimetres of where she had predicted.

In 1886 she returned to London as a reputed millionaire, although this may have been an exaggeration. Despite not being able to enter London's club's because of her gender she floated the "Midas Mine" on the London Stock Exchange. Moreover she also created the British and Australian Mining Trust and Investment Company to allow people to invest money directly in Australian mines.

Cornwell bought the Sunday Times in 1887 from Colonel George FitzGeorge, an illegitimate member of the Royal Family. Her purpose was to promote her new company and the newspaper was in effect a gift to her lover Phil Robinson. In 1888 her friend Fergus Hume wrote a novel, "Madame Midas" about a "Mrs Villiers" which was obviously based on Cornwell.

Cornwell sold the Sunday Times in 1893 to Frederick Beer, who already owned Observer. Beer appointed his wife, Rachel Sassoon Beer, as editor.

Cornwell's estranged first husband died in 1893 and she took Robinson's name in 1894. Robinson was judicially separated from his wife Sarah, rather than divorced, and never legally married Cornwell. He assumed the name Frederick Stennard Robinson and Alice assumed the name Mrs Ann Stennard Robinson. They had an illegitimate daughter, Myrtle Dorothy Robinson.

Cornwell died in 1932 in Hove.
