= Herman Klein =

English music critic, author and singing teacher

Herman Klein

Herman Klein (born Hermann Klein; 23 July 1856 – 10 March 1934) was an English music critic, author and teacher of singing. Klein's famous brothers included Charles and Manuel Klein. His second wife was the writer Kathleen Clarice Louise Cornwell, and one of their children was the writer Denise Robins.

For thirteen years, Klein was a vocal teacher at the Guildhall School of Music in London, becoming a lifelong proponent of the methods of Manuel Garcia and helping to edit Garcia's book on the subject. In 1876 he took up musical journalism, writing for The Sunday Times from 1881–1901, among other publications. He also contributed prolifically to The Musical Times. From 1901 to 1909, Klein lived and taught singing in New York City, where he wrote for The New York Herald. He was one of the first critics to take notice of the gramophone and was appointed "musical adviser" to Columbia Records in 1906 in New York. He returned to England in 1909.

Klein wrote over half a dozen books about music and singers, as well as English translations of operas and art songs. He was a noted authority on Gilbert and Sullivan. In 1924 he began writing for The Gramophone and was in charge of operatic reviews, as well as contributing a monthly article on singing, from then until his death.

== Biography ==
=== Personal life ===
Klein was born in Norwich, Norfolk, East Anglia, England the son of Hermann Klein senior and his wife Adelaide (née Soman). Apparently, the elder Klein emigrated from Riga, Latvia, then part of the Russian Empire, and home to a large community of German-speaking Jews such as the Kleins. Once in Norwich, his father became a professor of foreign languages at the King Edward VI Grammar School, and his mother taught dance. The younger Klein's five brothers were Max, a violinist, Charles, a dramatist; Manuel, a composer; Alfred, an actor; and Philip. They had a sister, Adelaide. He was the uncle of the producer Philip Klein (1888–1935).

Although his forename was frequently spelled as "Hermann" until World War I, he "deprecated any foreign pronunciation of it and was proud of his British citizenship and upbringing". The musical activities of Norwich, particularly its Festival and the Cathedral services, impressed him as a boy. He was educated in Norwich and later in London.

Klein was married three times. His first wife was Emily May Brown, a ballerina, with whom he had a daughter, Sibyl Klein, who became an actress; they divorced. On 19 February 1890, he married a 17-year-old Australian-born heiress Kathleen Clarice Louise Cornwell, later a popular writer, at the West London Synagogue. Their children included three writers: Adrian Bernard L. Klein (1892–1969), who changed his name to Adrian Cornwell-Clyne, the historian and poet Daryl Klein (b. 1894), and Denise Naomi Klein (1897–1985), who under her first married name, Denise Robins, became a romance novelist and was the first president of the Romantic Novelists' Association (1960–1966). Robins' daughter, Patricia Robins, was also a romance writer under the name Claire Lorrimer. During her marriage to Klein, Kathleen Clarice began an affair with a young man, Herbert Arthur Berkeley Dealtry (b. 1878), who was a Worcestershire Regiment officer. When Klein became aware of it, he filed a petition for divorce, which was granted in December 1901. He was still affiliated with the West London Synagogue in 1901, the year of his divorce and his departure for New York. Klein's third wife was Helene Fox, a Christian Science practitioner of Boston, Massachusetts, whom he married in 1905.

Klein died in London, aged 77.

=== Career ===
For thirteen years, Klein was a vocal teacher at the Guildhall School of Music in London and also trained many professional singers privately. He wrote songs and short works for piano. In 1874, Klein returned to Norwich temporarily to help his ailing mother. That year Manuel Garcia also moved into the same house as Klein at 1 Bentinck Street in London. Klein became his student for four years and was closely associated with him for another six years. The friendship became a transformative experience for Klein, who would recall Garcia and his singing principles in many of his writings throughout his life. He helped edit Garcia's book on his singing method, published in English in 1872 (later revised by Klein and published as Hints on Singing in 1894).

In 1876 Klein took up musical journalism. He began writing for The Examiner in 1879, and then for The Sunday Times (1881–1901), The Illustrated London News, The Citizen, and the Lady's Pictorial. He was for many years a musical correspondent of The Manchester Guardian and The Scotsman and also contributed prolifically to The Musical Times.

From 1901 to 1909, He lived in New York City, where he wrote for The New York Herald, taught singing, and was a founder and first chairman of the National Association of Teachers of Singing. He was one of the first critics to take notice of the gramophone. He was appointed "musical adviser" to Columbia Records in 1906 in New York and was responsible for introducing David Bispham, Anton van Rooy, Lillian Blauvelt and Ruth Vincent and others to the recording studio. Klein eventually came to hold an unfavourable view of American musical life and returned to Britain in May 1909, continuing to teach and write. He wrote over half a dozen books about music and singers, as well as English translations of operas and art songs. In 1924 he began writing for The Gramophone and was in charge of operatic reviews, as well as contributing a monthly article on singing, from then until his death.

Among his other activities, Klein listed "Inventor of the Phono-Vocal Method of learning singing with the aid of a gramophone" and "Past Grand Organist of Grand Lodge of Freemasons". He was a member of the Critics' Circle, of which he was president and also chairman of its musical committee.

== Publications ==
In addition to publishing several books containing his criticism or music commentary, in which he left "vivid pictures of the great singers whose art he studied in the opera house", Klein translated several operas, including Carmen, and poems of over seventy songs by Schubert, Schumann and Brahms. He was an authority on Gilbert and Sullivan, having, as a young man, known Arthur Sullivan well and worked with him on musical committees. Klein arranged for Sullivan to provide incidental music for Henry Irving's 1888 production of Macbeth. He later contributed articles on Gilbert and Sullivan to The Gramophone. For The Musical Times, he wrote on subjects including Music Festivals, the Royal Albert Hall, the Royal Choral Society, Camille Saint-Saëns, Richard Wagner and Nellie Melba.

Books

- Klein, Herman (1887–1890). Musical notes: annual critical record of important musical events. London: Carson and Comerford. – 4 volumes
- Garcia, Manuel (1894). Hints on Singing (New and revised ed.). London: Ascherberg, Hopwood and Crew. (Klein was an editor)
- Klein, Herman (1903). Thirty Years of Musical Life in London, 1870–1900. New York: Century.
- Klein, Herman (1909). The Hermann Klein phono-vocal method: based upon the famous School of Manuel Garcia. New York: E. Schuberth.
- Klein, Herman (1910). Unmusical New York; a brief criticism of triumphs, failures, & abuses. London; New York: John Lane.
- Klein, Herman (1920). The Reign of Adelina Patti. New York: The Century Co.
- Klein, Herman (1923). The bel canto, with particular reference to the singing of Mozart. London: Oxford University Press.
- Klein, Herman (1925). Musicians and Mummers. London: Cassell.
- Klein, Herman (1931). Great Woman-Singers of My Time. London: Routledge.
- Klein, Herman (1933). The Golden Age of Opera. London: G. Routledge & Sons.
- Klein, Herman (1990). Moran, William R. (ed.). Herman Klein and The Gramophone. Portland, OR: Amadeus Press. ISBN 0-931340-18-7. – compilation of articles from The Gramophone
