= Jack's Magazine =

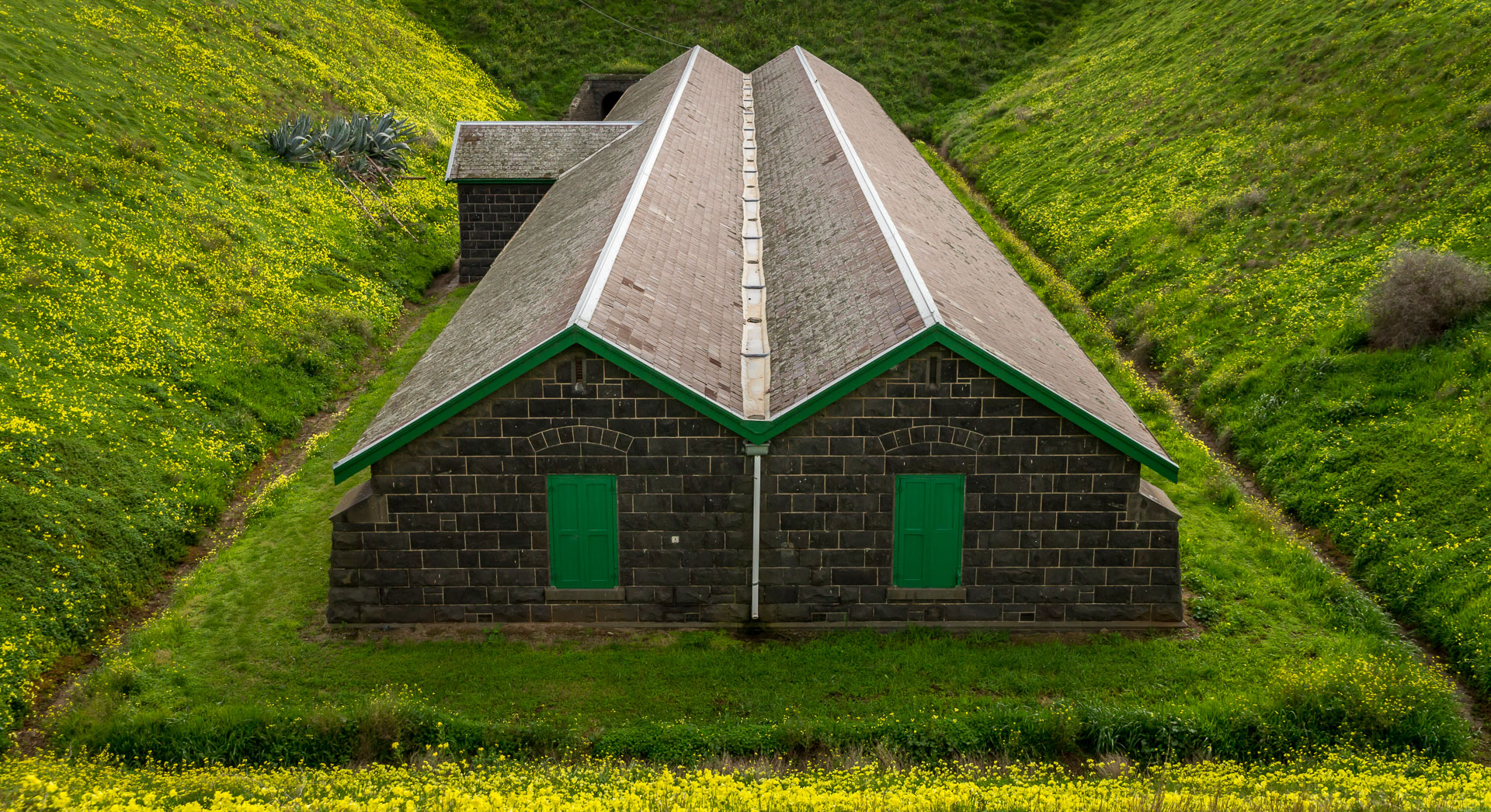
- The magazine in 2016

- Location within Melbourne
- Alternative names: Saltwater River Gunpowder Magazine
- Etymology: Wally Jack (keeper, WWI–1943)

General information
- Type: Gunpowder magazine
- Location: Maribyrnong, Melbourne, Victoria, Australia
- Coordinates: 37°46′55″S 144°53′43″E
- Year built: 1876–1878
- Completed: 1878; 148 years ago
- Opened: c. 2026 (as a tourist site)
- Closed: 1993 (as a magazine)
- Client: Colony of Victoria
- Owner: Colony of Victoria (1876–1901); Australian Government (1901–c. 2004); Victorian Government (since c. 2004)
- Operator: Working Heritage

Technical details
- Material: Bluestone; bricks
- Size: 6 ha (15 acres)

Design and construction
- Architect: William Wardell
- Architecture firm: Public Works Department
- Main contractor: George Cornwell

Website
- workingheritage.com.au

Victorian Heritage Register
- Official name: Jack's Magazine
- Type: Registered place
- Designated: 18 April 1996
- Reference no.: H1154
- Heritage overlay no.: HO45
- Categories: Military; Transport - Water

Register of the National Estate
- Official name: Jacks Magazine
- Type: Defunct register
- Designated: 30 June 1992
- Reference no.: 5477

The Jack's Magazine, also known as the Saltwater River Gunpowder Magazine, is a gunpowder magazine located on the western banks of the Maribyrnong River, off La Scala Avenue, (Note: Also listed as 1 Gordon Street.) in Maribyrnong, an inner-western suburb of Melbourne, in Victoria, Australia. Built in 1878 to provide safe storage for bonded gunpowder and explosives imported into the Colony of Victoria, the structure was decommissioned in 1993. Managed by Working Heritage, the site has been open to the public since 2026.

Located on the traditional lands of the Wurundjeri Woi Wurrung, the site was added to the Victorian Heritage Register on 18 April 1996 in recognition of its historical, architectural and scientific significance; and was added to non-statutory heritage lists by the Victorian branch of the National Trust on 6 August 1997, the City of Maribyrnong on an unknown date, and various elements to other non-statutory heritage curtails. The site was also added to the now defunct Register of the National Estate on 30 June 1992.

== Etymology ==
Formally known as the Saltwater River Gunpowder Magazine, the facility became popularly known as Jack’s Magazine in recognition of Wally Jack who served as depot foreman and keeper of the magazine from World War I until 1943.

== Description ==
Jack's Magazine is a virtually intact complex of 19th century, twin bluestone-vaulted and gunpowder storage buildings, that are concealed behind high earth mound blast walls, and a tall bluestone wall, with a canal connecting it to the river. The six-hectare (fifteen-acre) site also contains tunnels, tramways, service buildings, and a loading dock. The twin 64-metre-long (210 ft) and 11-metre-wide (35 ft) tunnels were approved in 1875, designed by government architect, William Wardell, as Inspector General of the Public Works Department, and built by contractor George Cornwell between 1876 and 1878, commissioned by the Victorian colonial government.

On the Federation of Australia, the complex passed to the Australian Government, which built several brick magazines between 1908 and 1921, and became part of the former Footscray Ammunition Factory from the 1920s. The Footscray Ammunition Factory was mostly demolished and redeveloped for the Edgewater estate by Delfin Lend Lease.

== Decommission and subsequent use ==
Jack's Magazine was decommissioned from 1993 and it was proposed that the site be redeveloped for a commercial use. Following several calls for expressions of interests it was decided that public ownership was the only practical management for the historic site. Jack's Magazine was transferred from the Commonwealth to the Victorian government in c. 2004. It has been managed by Working Heritage – a committee appointed by the Victorian Government to manage heritage properties on Crown land, and after ten years of remediation and short-term/temporary open days, it opened as a tourist site in 2026.

In an interview aired in 2020 on the SBS TV series Secrets of Our Cities, Peter Haffenden, a local resident, asserted that, from Jack's Magazine, "all the bullets, all the .303s bullets used in Gallipoli, in Egypt, in the Somme, in Amiens" were all made by the munition company, whose main factory was based at Jack's Magazine.

== See also ==
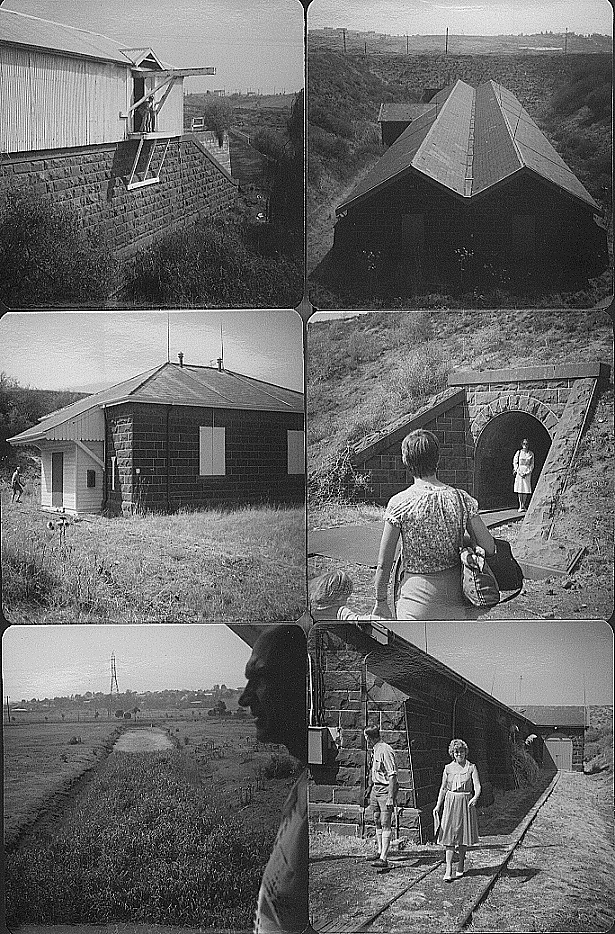
Various views of Jacks Magazine courtesy of the Footscray Historical Society

- Architecture of Melbourne
- List of places on the Victorian Heritage Register in the City of Maribyrnong
