= Manuel Klein =

English-American composer (1876–1919)

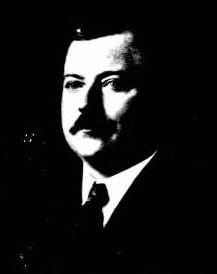
Passport photograph, 1915

Manuel Joachim Klein (6 December 1876 – 1 June 1919) was an English-born composer of musical theatre and incidental music who worked primarily in New York City.

== Biography ==
Klein was born in London, to parents Herman and Adelaide (née Soman). Apparently, the elder Klein emigrated from Riga, Latvia. Once in Norwich, Hermann became a professor of foreign languages at the King Edward VI Grammar School, and Adelaide taught dance. The younger Klein's five brothers included Max, a violinist; Charles, a playwright; Herman, a music critic and music teacher; Alfred, an actor; and Philip. They had a sister, Adelaide. He was the uncle of producer Philip Klein (1888–1935). Klein was educated in London and at Tivoli House Academy, Gravesend, Kent, England.

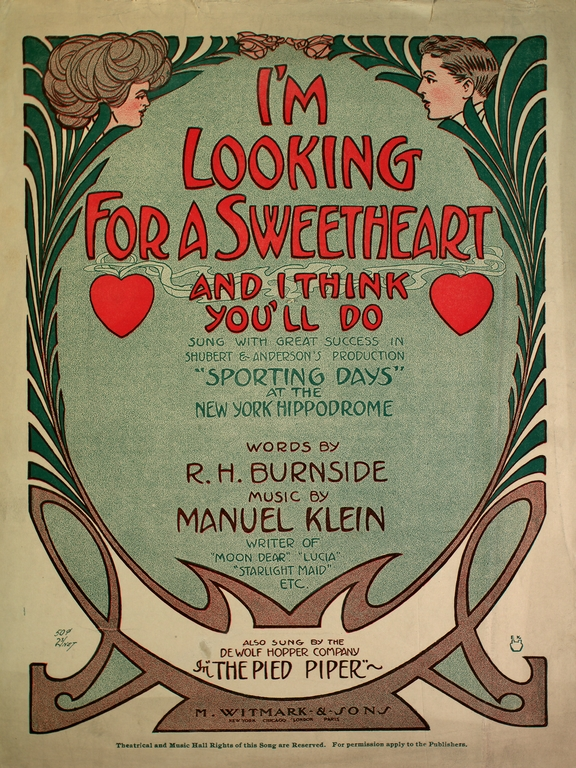
Sheet music (1908)

=== Career ===
Klein moved to the US on 11 April 1896. He was the music director for David Belasco's theatre company in New York City for several years before devoting himself to composing. His first Broadway success was the musical Mr. Pickwick, starring De Wolf Hopper. Grant Stewart wrote the lyrics, and Klein's brother Charles wrote the book. He also conducted for Charles Frohman, with whom Klein's brother, Charles, was later killed on the RMS Lusitania, among others.

Tin Pan Alley songwriter and publisher Gus Edwards helped Klein to obtain the position of musical director of the prestigious New York Hippodrome theatre in 1905. Klein was soon composing songs and music for numerous spectacles presented at the Hippodrome consisting of different acts, each one with their own thematic musical concept. He collaborated with L. Frank Baum on The Tik-Tok Man of Oz, beginning in 1909, which was finally produced in 1913 without Klein's music. He left the Hippodrome in 1915 after a disagreement with its manager, Jacob J. Shubert, over the orchestra. Shubert asked Klein to send some drums, trumpets and other instruments over to the Winter Garden Theater, where he was producing another show. Klein refused to send them, as he needed them for his own orchestra. After an argument, Klein offered his resignation, and Shubert accepted it. The Hippodrome company sided with Klein, and Shubert was forced to sell his interest. Klein went back to England the same year and became music director of the Gaiety Theatre, London. He suffered a trauma at the bombing of the theatre during World War I by the Zeppelins and never fully recovered.

Klein returned to New York and died in Yonkers, New York, on 1 June 1919, as a result of the earlier trauma. After his death, the Klein family sued the German government for the loss of Manuel and his brother Charles (a victim of the sinking of the RMS Lusitania).

=== Family life ===
Klein married his wife, Helen (born 16 September 1884 in Cincinnati, Ohio), in approximately 1905. They had a daughter, Marjorie, born 28 March 1909 and a son, Gerald, born 18 March 1912. Klein became a naturalised American citizen on 9 August 1910.

As of the 1930 United States Federal Census, his family had moved to Beverly Hills, California. Helen was working as a teacher, Marjorie as a stenographer for the movie industry, and Gerald as a radio repairman.

== List of works ==
Music by Klein except as noted:

- 1899 Zaza
- 1899 Hope On!
- 1903 Mr. Pickwick (including "Boys Will Be Boys")
- 1903 Captain Barrington
- 1905 A Yankee Circus on Mars / The Raiders / Tomorrowland
- 1905 A Society Circus (including "Moon Dear"). Words by Manual Klein
- 1905 "I Want to Go Home Now". Words by John Kendrick Bangs
- 1906 The Man from Now (including "The Dainty Music Maid"). Words by Bangs
- 1906 Pioneer Days / Circus Events
- 1906 Neptune's Daughter including "Lucia" ("My Italian Maid"). Words by Manuel Klein
- 1906 The Only Way to Love
- 1907 The Top O' Th' World
- 1907 The Auto Race. Words by Manuel Klein
- 1907 O'Neill of Derry
- 1907 If You Are True to Me
- 1907 Starlight Maid
- 1908 Sporting Days. Words by Manuel Klein
- 1908 The Battle in the Skies. Words by Manuel Klein
- 1908 The Pied Piper (including "I'm Looking For a Sweetheart, and I Think You'll Do" and "Tell Me, Whose Little Girl Are You"?)
- 1909 A Ballet of Jewels
- 1909 A Trip to Japan
- 1909 "Meet Me When the Lanterns Glow". Words and music by Klein.
- 1910 Ragged Robin
- 1910 The International Cup / Ballet of Niagra / The Earthquake
- 1910 "Love is Like a Rainbow". Words and music by Klein
- 1910 Loving ("Love Comes at Morning, Love Comes at Noon")
- 1911 It's a Long Lane That Has No Turning
- 1911 Bow Sing
- 1911 Around the World
- 1911 Undine. Words and music by Klein
- 1912 Under Many Flags (including "Sweetheart (Let's Go A-Walking)"). Words and music by Klein.
- 1912 "Home is Where the Heart Is". Words and music by Klein
- 1912 Fishing
- 1913 The Hippodrome Tango
- 1913 America (including "The Girl in the Gingham gown")
- 1913 Hop o' My Thumb
- 1914 The Wars of the World
- 1914 "In Siam". Words and music by Klein
- 1914 You're Just the One I've Waited For
- 1919 High and Dri
- 1920 It's Up to You (revised version of High and Dri)

== Legacy ==
Although many individual songs by Klein were published, much of his incidental music remains in manuscript. Since he worked "for hire" at the Hippodrome, Charles Frohman and later R. H. Burnside retained his music manuscripts. They now form part of the Burnside collection of American theater music manuscripts in the Music Division of The New York Public Library for the Performing Arts.
