= Alfred Klein =

American actor and singer

- Born: May 12, 1861; Norwich, England
- Died: March 4, 1926 (aged 64); Amityville, New York, United States
- Spouse: Rachel

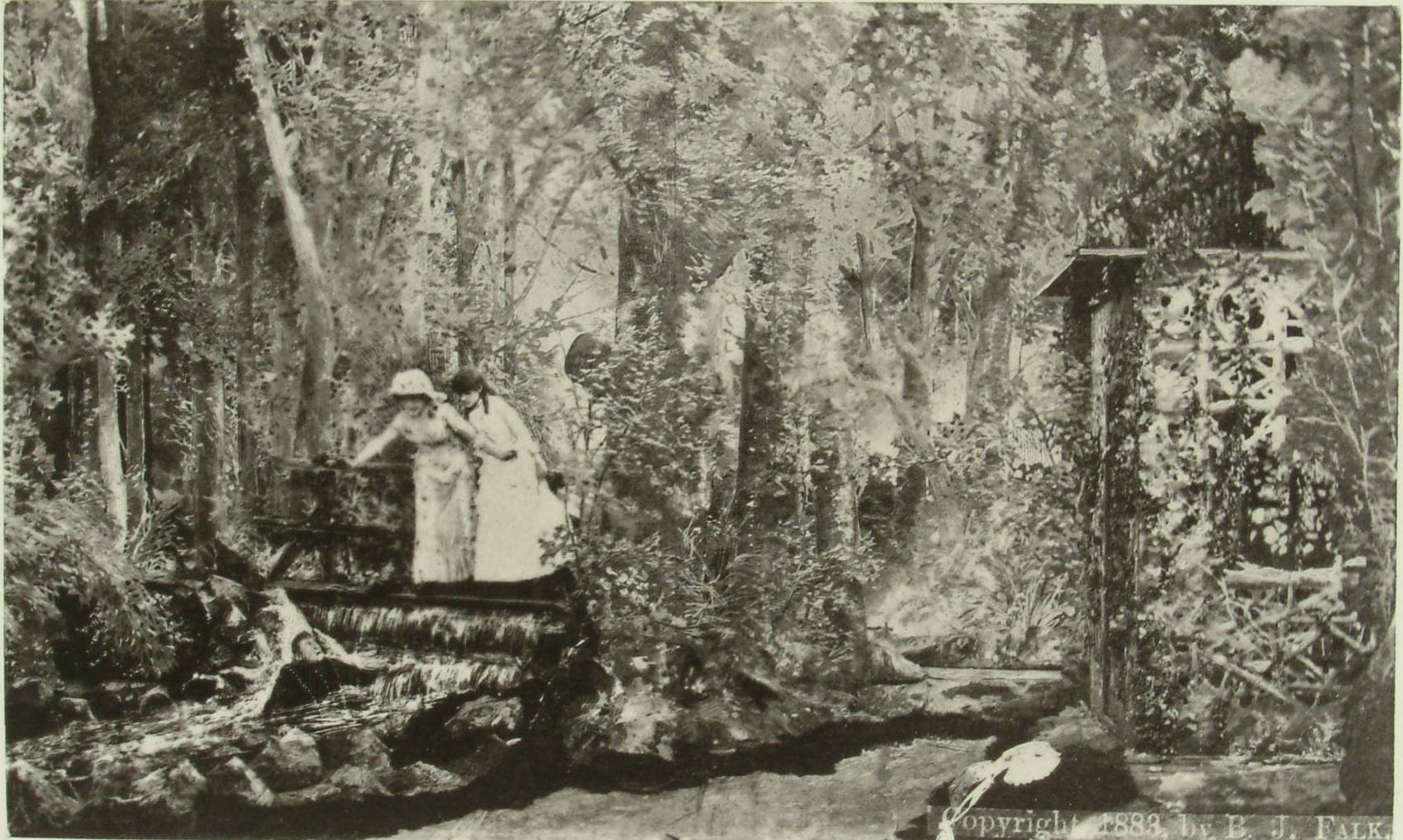
Klein falling into a brook in the 1883 play The Rajah.

Alfred Asher Klein (May 12, 1861 – February 21, 1904) was an English-born stage actor, singer and comedian who appeared in operettas and musical theatre in America in the late 19th century.

== Life and career ==
Klein was born in Norwich, England in 1861, and emigrated to the United States as a young man. He had five brothers: the dramatist Charles, the composer Manuel, the music critic Herman, the violinist Max, and Philip. They had a sister, Adelaide. His first appearances on stage included Sir Joseph in a juvenile production of H.M.S. Pinafore in 1879, and a role with the traveling company of Only a Farmer's Daughter around 1881.

Small in stature, Klein's notable roles included Buttons in The Rajah in 1883, where he had to fall into a tank of water in the third act. In 1891, he appeared in the musical Wang with DeWolf Hopper, and in 1896 in the operetta El Capitan.

Klein died in Amityville, New York, on February 21, 1904, after a three-year illness, survived by his wife and two children.

== Selected performances ==
- Only a Farmer's Daughter (c. 1881)
- Falka
- The Rajah as Buttons (1883)
- Wang as Pepat (1891)
- El Capitan as Señor Amabile Pozzo (1896)
