= Patricia Robins =

British author of short stories and novels (1921-2016)

- Born: Patricia Denise Robins; 1 February 1921; Hove, Sussex, England
- Died: 4 December 2016 (aged 95); Kent, England
- Occupation: Novelist
- Spouse: Donald Clark
- Partner: Mel Hack
- Children: 3
- Relatives: Denise Robins (mother), K. C. Groom (grandmother), Herman Klein (grandfather)
- Writing career
- Pen name: Patricia Robins, Claire Lorrimer, Susan Patrick
- Period: 1934–2016
- Genres: romance, gothic
- Website: clairelorrimer.co.uk

Patricia Robins (1 February 1921 – 4 December 2016) was a British writer of short stories and over 80 novels, mainly romance, from 1934 to 2016. She also signed under the pseudonym Claire Lorrimer; she had sold more than ten million copies. She served as Women's Auxiliary Air Force officer during World War II tracking Nazi bombers.

Robins came from an artistic family. Her mother was the popular romance writer Denise Robins, who sold more than one hundred million copies and was the first president of the Romantic Novelists' Association (1960–1966). Her maternal grandmother was the writer K. C. Groom and her maternal grandfather was Herman Klein, a musician. Her maternal uncle was Adrian Cornwell-Clyne, who wrote books on photography and cinematography, another uncle was an artist, as is her daughter.

== Biography ==
Patricia Denise Robins was born on 1 February 1921 in Hove, Sussex, England, the second daughter of Arthur Robins, a corn broker on the Baltic Exchange and Denise Robins, a prolific author, who sold more than one hundred million copies, and the first president of the Romantic Novelists' Association (1960–1966). She had two sisters, Eve Louise and Anne Eleanor. She was educated at Parents' National Educational Union at Burgess Hill, Sussex, and also in Switzerland and Germany.

Her mother encouraged her to write, and at 12 she published her first children's novella in 1934. She worked as junior editor in a woman's magazine editorial and published short stories.

Thanks to her knowledge of German, she served as Women's Auxiliary Air Force officer during World War II. She tracked Nazi bombers with the fledgling British radar system in a top-secret RAF filter room. Not until 2013 did she receive recognition, due to the confidential nature of her work.

During the war she also went on to write contemporary romance novels like her mother. She also published some children's stories.

In 1947, she married former RAF pilot Donald Clark, they had three children, Ian, Nicky and Graeme. Because of her husband's job, the family lived in many countries, including Libya. After their divorce, she started a relationship with Mel Hack and moved to a 400-year-old former barn in rural Kent.

In the 1967 she started to use the pseudonym Claire Lorrimer to write Gothic romances, and later family sagas. Some of her early novels were reedited under different titles and as Clare Lorrimer.

In her late years, she devoted more time to her eight grandchildren, Emily, Jemma, Polly, Charlotte, Thomas, Arthur, Max and Tilly, but she continued writing until her death.

In 2007, she published her autobiography You Never Know as Claire Lorrimer.

Yes, after every book is finished I decide it is the last one, and then I get an idea in my head and it germinates and before I know it I've started typing and we are off again.

In March 2016, she was given the Outstanding Achievement Award at the Romantic Novelists' Association. She died on 4 December 2016 in Hove.

== Bibliography ==
Some of her novels have been reedited under different titles or as Clare Lorrimer.

=== As Patricia Robins ===
==== Children's books ====
===== Single titles =====
- The Adventures of the Three Baby Bunnies (1934)
- The Heart of a Rose (1947)
- The One Hundred Pound Reward (1966)

===== Peter and Angela Series =====
1. Tree Fairies (1945)
2. Sea Magic (1946)

==== Romance Novels ====
===== Single titles =====
- To the Stars (1944)
- See No Evil (1945)
- Awake My Heart (1950)
- Beneath the Moon (1951) aka The Legend
- Leave My Heart Alone (1951) aka An Open Door
- The Fair Deal (1952)
- So This Is Love (1953)
- Heaven in Our Hearts (1954)
- One Who Cares (1954)
- Love Cannot Die (1955) aka Never Say Goodbye
- The Foolish Heart (1956)
- Give All to Love (1956) aka For Always
- Where Duty Lies (1957)
- He Is Mine (1957) aka The Faithful Heart
- Love Must Wait (1958)
- Lonely Quest (1959) aka The Search for Love
- Lady Chatterley's Daughter (1961) aka Connie's Daughter
- The Last Chance (1961)
- Seven Loves (1962) aka Fulfilment
- The Long Wait (1962)
- The Runaways (1962)
- With All My Love (1963)
- The Constant Heart (1964)
- Any Time at All (1964)
- The Night Is Thine (1964)
- Second Love (1964) aka Second Chance
- No More Loving (1965)
- Topaz Island (1965)
- There Is But One (1965)
- The Uncertain Joy (1966)
- Love Me Tomorrow (1966)
- The Man Behind the Mask (1967) aka Forever
- Sapphire in the sand (1967)
- Forbidden (1967)
- Return to Love (1968)
- No Stone Unturned (1969)
- Laugh on Friday (1969)
- Under the Sky (1970) aka Beneath the Sun
- Cinnabar House (1970)
- The Crimson Tapestry (1971) aka The Woven Thread
- Play Fair with Love (1972)
- None But He (1973)
- Forsaken (re-edition)

===== Bainbury Saga =====
1. Three Loves (1949) aka The Reunion
2. Heart's Desire (1953) aka The Reckoning

=== As Claire Lorrimer ===
==== Single novels ====
===== Gothic Romance =====
- A Voice in the Dark (1967)
- The Shadow Falls (1974)
- The Secret of Quarry House (1976)
- Relentless Storm (1979)

==== Women of Fire Saga ====
1. Mavreen (1976) aka Scarlett
2. Tamarisk (1978) aka Antoinette
3. Chantal (1980)

==== Rochford Trilogy ====
1. The Chatelaine (1978)
2. The Wilderling (1982)
3. Fool's Curtain (1994)

===== Short story =====
- The Garden (1980)

===== Historical Novels =====
- Last Year's Nightingale (1984)
- Frost in the Sun (1986)
- The Spinning Wheel (1991)
- The Silver Link (1993)
- Deception (2003)
- Troubled Waters (2004)
- Truth to Tell (2007)
- Obsession (2013)
- Georgia (2013)
- Live the Dream (2016)

==== Ortolans ====
Ortolans (1990)

1. Eleanor (1994)
2. Sophia (1994)
3. Emma (1994)

===== Mavreen (Audio) =====
1. The Full Moon (1995)
2. Harvest Moon (1995)
3. The New Moon (1995)

===== Tamarisk (Audio) =====
1. The Fledgling (1996)
2. The Skylark (1996)

===== Murder Mysteries =====
- Over My Dead Body (2003)
- Dead Centre (2005)
- Infatuation (2007)
- Dead Reckoning (2009)
- Trust Me (2015)

==== Collections ====
- Variations: The Snake Belt / One in Three / The WhiteDoves / The Angel and the Witch or Miss Tansley's Easter Play / Trust Me / Once a Year / Goat's Loose / The Patient in Number Twenty-Two / Comfortand Joy / Two Sides to a Coin / Old Toys Wanted / A True Story / PoorLittle Rich Girl / Progress / The Garden (1991)
- Emotions (2008)

==== Non-fiction ====
- House of Tomorrow (Biography) (1987)
- You Never Know (Autobiography) (2007)
