= 1 Bentinck Street =

House in the City of Westminster, London

Coordinates: 51.5173°N 0.1495°W

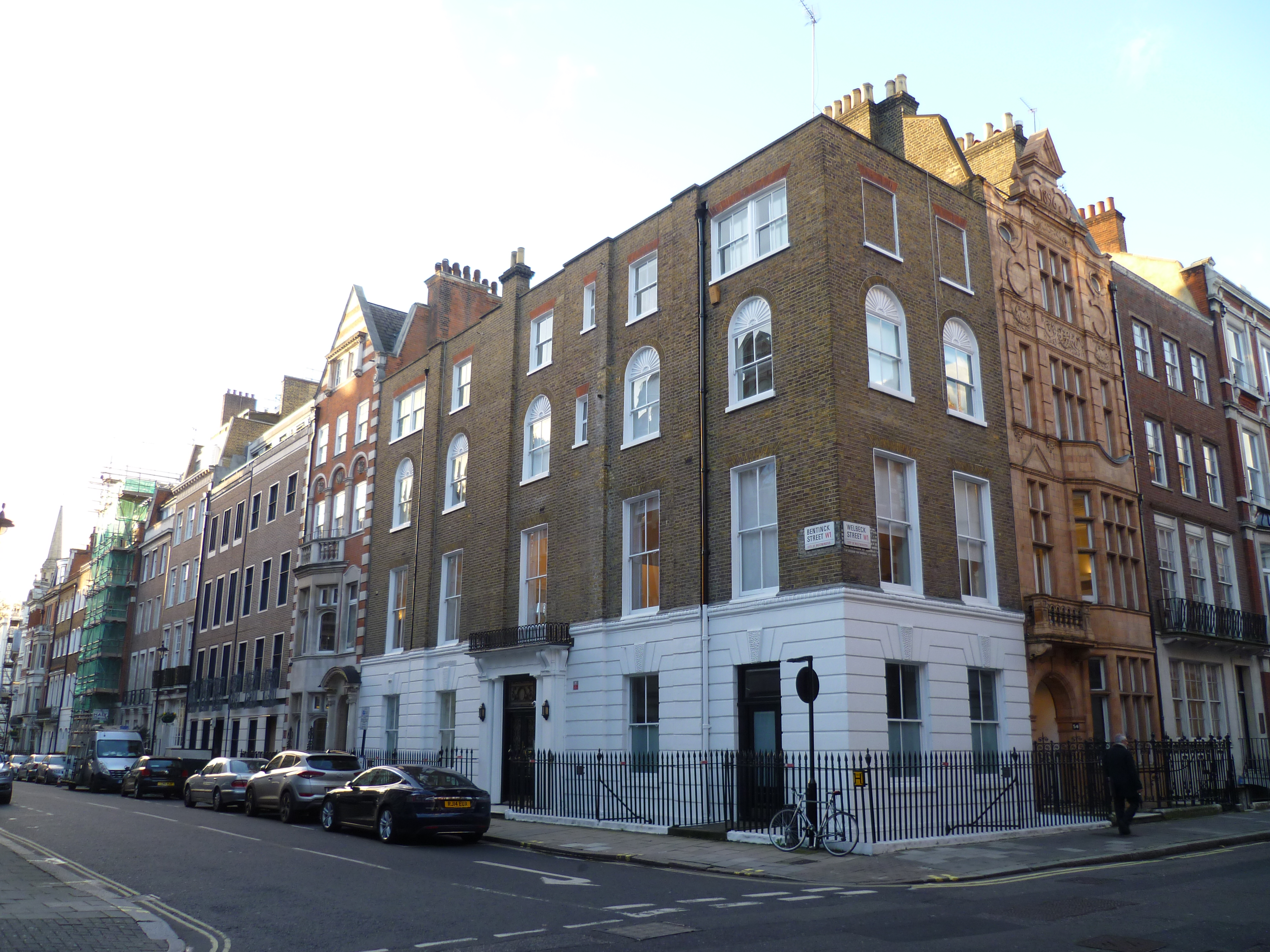
1 Bentinck Street in 2016

1 Bentinck Street is a grade II listed house in Bentinck Street, in the City of Westminster, London. The house was completed around 1800. It is on the corner with Welbeck Street.

The house retains many original Georgian architectural features. These include a stuccoed façade, a central doorway with a decorative fanlight, and original sash windows on both floors.
