= Hoddle Bridge =

Arch bridge in Melbourne, Victoria, Australia

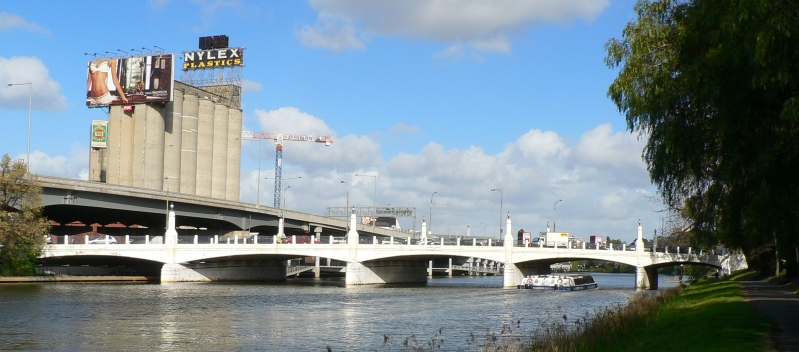
- Coordinates: 37°49′49″S 144°59′16″E
- Carries: Punt Road; vehicles, pedestrians, cyclists
- Crosses: Yarra River
- Locale: Melbourne, Victoria, Australia
- Begins: Richmond
- Ends: South Yarra
- Other name: Punt Road Bridge (former)
- Named for: Robert Hoddle
- Owner: VicRoads
- Preceded by: Cremorne railway bridge
- Followed by: Morell Bridge

Characteristics
- Design: Arch bridge (T-beam)
- Material: Continuous reinforced concrete

History
- Built: 1937–1938
- Construction cost: A£77,009
- Opened: 22 December 1938; 87 years ago

Location
- Interactive map of Hoddle Bridge

The Hoddle Bridge is an arch bridge that carries Punt Road across the Yarra River, connecting Richmond and South Yarra in Melbourne, Victoria, Australia. The bridge was completed in 1938 and is situated at the junction of the Melbourne City, Yarra City, and Stonnington local government areas.

== History ==
A punt was established at this point in the river in 1842, the name soon being attached to the north-south road leading to it through Richmond, and to the road through South Yarra across the river to the south, which did not align. In 1895, a footbridge was constructed joining the two roads in connection with a new sewer line that was to cross the river, utilising steel Pratt trusses. The trusses were later reused for a stock bridge over the Maribyrnong River. (Note: Now known as the Angliss Stock Bridge.)

In 1934, Melbourne City Council advocated for the construction of a road bridge and an agreement was reached with the Victorian Government in 1936. The Country Roads Board began construction of the bridge in late 1937, with tenders for sub-contracted work (involving driving 240 concrete piles and the construction of four river piers) released. During 1937, the contractor drove all the piles and completed one pier, but owing to the slow rate of progress the contract was concluded and the work completed by direct labour under the Board's engineers. As no satisfactory tender was received for the construction of the abutments and super-structure, the work put in hand by the Board by direct labour. Total cost was A£77,009.

Before construction of the bridge began, the nearest crossing for traffic was at the Morell Bridge, some eight hundred metres (0.5 mi) downstream. Traffic conditions at this narrow bridge were very congested, as a considerable proportion of traffic which came down from the north along Punt Road was compelled to swing to the west to cross the river and thence again to the east for an extra 1.6 kilometres (1 mi). Comparisons of traffic measurements taken in the vicinity before and after the bridge had opened had shown not only a decrease in total distance in crossing the river, but an increase of traffic of 17.38%.

== Etymology ==
The bridge was originally referred to as Punt Road Bridge, and was named after the surveyor Robert Hoddle upon opening by the Premier of Victoria Albert Dunstan on 22 December 1938.

== Description ==
It is a five-lane road bridge with footpaths on either side. It is constructed of reinforced concrete, supported on transverse piers aligned with the river but at an angle to the road, with five segmental arched spans of continuous T-beam construction, supported on, topped by concrete cross-beams supporting the roadway.

Decorative features are in the Art Deco style, namely wrought iron balustrade, and the pylons above each pier end, topped by Victorian-styled lamps.

== See also ==
- Crossings of the Yarra River

== Notes ==
Next crossing upstream	Yarra River	Next crossing downstream
Cremorne railway bridge (railway)	Hoddle Bridge	Morell Bridge (pedestrians; cyclists)
