= Hawthorn Railway Bridge =

Railway bridge in Melbourne, Victoria, Australia

- Coordinates: 37°49′32.4″S 145°01′03″E
- Carries: Burnley Group: Lilydale; Belgrave; Alamein lines
- Crosses: Yarra River
- Locale: Melbourne, Victoria, Australia
- Begins: Burnley (west)
- Ends: Hawthorn (east)
- Named for: Hawthorn
- Preceded by: Hawthorn Bridge
- Followed by: Wallen Road Bridge (also called Swan Street Bridge) (Note: Not to be confused with the Swan Street Bridge.)

Characteristics
- Design: Truss bridge
- Material: Steel
- Pier construction: Bluestone
- Total length: 100 m (330 ft)
- Width: 17 m (56 ft)
- Longest span: 40 m (130 ft)

Rail characteristics
- No. of tracks: 1 (1861–1882); 2 (1882–1971); 3 (since 1971)

History
- Designer: Francis Bell
- Constructed by: George Cornwell and Co
- Opened: 13 April 1861; 165 years ago
- Rebuilt: 1882 (duplication); 1912 (2nd bridge); 1939 (new west span); 1971 (third track)

Location
- Interactive map of Hawthorn Railway Bridge

The Hawthorn Railway Bridge is a steel truss bridge that crosses the Yarra River 5 kilometres (3.1 mi) east of Melbourne, in Victoria, Australia. The bridge carries the Burnley Group between Burnley and Hawthorn stations on the Alamein, Belgrave and Lilydale lines. Completed in 1861 by the Melbourne and Suburban Railway Company, it is the oldest extant railway bridge over the Yarra River.

The Main Yarra Trail passes underneath the western abutment of the bridge.

== Description ==
Completed in 1861, Hawthorn Railway Bridge was designed by Francis Bell. The opening had been delayed due to delays in completion of the bridge with the original iron trusses having been lost at sea. With a span of approximately 60 metres (200 ft), it was one of the last major items of permanent way to be built on the fledgling railway. The contractors were George Cornwell and Co. (Note: Not Goldsack & Co as recorded in Leo Harrigan's Victorian Railways to '62, account of the history of railways in Victoria.)

Cornwell had previously been involved as contractor in many other major construction works including the Melbourne and Suburban Railway as a whole, as well as Melbourne Grammar School, the Model School, Coppin's Haymarket Theatre, and the Sunbury railway goods shed. Subsequently, he was a contractor on Parliament House, Albert Park Station, Jack's Magazine and the Wallaby Creek water supply.

It is likely that Alexander Kennedy Smith, who had designed the Cremorne Railway Bridge for the Melbourne and Suburban Railway Co, was also involved in the design of the Hawthorn Bridge, but was perhaps out of his depth. He ordered trusses which were inadequate for the job, and had to shorten them, suggesting he did not understand the design.

The opening of the bridge on 13 April 1861 allowed the Melbourne and Suburban Railway Company to extend its line from Pic Nic railway station (east of Burnley) to Hawthorn. The earliest views of the bridge show it to consist of a deck lattice girder with five intersects. The main span over the river was flanked by segmental bluestone arch spans on either side, detailed in an Italianate style. The construction of the railway bridge and line to Hawthorn advanced the rapid growth of the suburb.

The bridge was duplicated in 1882 by the Railways Construction Branch, and minor works to the bearings and girder ends were made in 1887–8 to lower the levels of its girders by 6 in (150 mm). A new double-track bridge using large double Warren trusses was built on its north side in 1912. One of the previous wrought iron lattice trusses was left in place.

The bridge was extended westwards in 1938–39 when a new span was added to cross the Yarra Boulevard, which was constructed by sustenance workers during the Depression as a scenic drive. In 1971, the original piers were strengthened and a metal girder span added to accommodate a third track.

== See also ==
- Crossings of the Yarra River

== Notes ==
Next bridge upstream	Yarra River	Next bridge downstream
Hawthorn Bridge (trams; vehicles; pedestrians; cyclists)	Hawthorn Railway Bridge	Swan Street / Wallen Road Bridge (vehicles; pedestrians; cyclists)
