= Church Street Bridge =

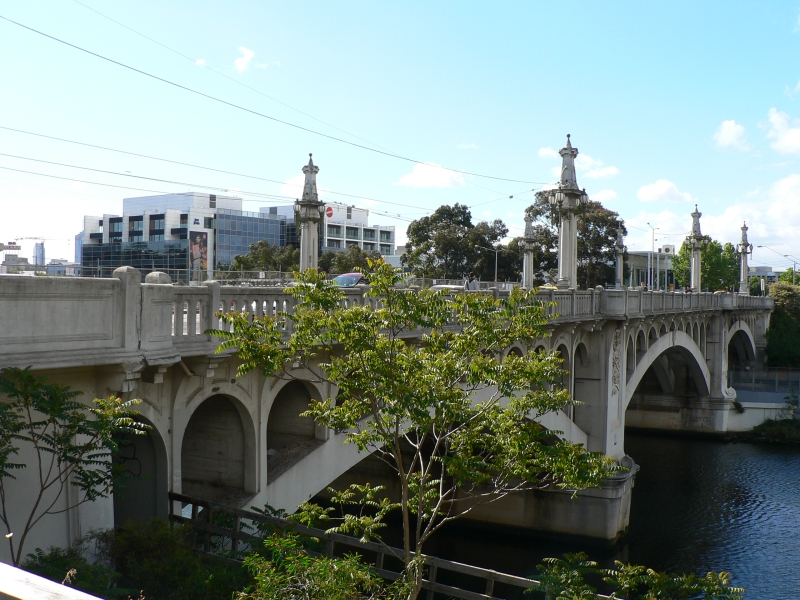
- The bridge in 2006
- Coordinates: 37°50′3″S 144°59′48″E
- Carries: Motor vehicles; Pedestrians / cyclists; –
- Crosses: Yarra River; Monash Freeway; Main Yarra / Capital City trails
- Locale: Melbourne, Victoria, Australia
- Begins: Chapel Street, South Yarra
- Ends: Church Street, Richmond / Cremorne
- Owner: VicRoads
- Preceded by: MacRobertson Bridge
- Followed by: Cremorne railway bridge

Characteristics
- Design: Arch bridge
- Material: Reinforced concrete
- Width: 20 m (66 ft)
- No. of spans: 3
- Piers in water: 1

History
- Architect: Harold Desbrowe Annear
- Designer: John Albert Laing
- Constructed by: Reinforced Concrete and Monier Pipe Construction Company
- Construction end: 1923
- Opened: 8 July 1924; 102 years ago
- Rebuilt: 1960s; 1990s; 2007
- Replaces: 1857 structure

Victorian Heritage Register
- Official name: Church Street Bridge
- Type: Registered place
- Designated: 9 August 2001
- Reference no.: H1917
- Category: Transport - Road
- Heritage overlay nos.: HO19, HO239

Location
- Interactive map of Church Street Bridge

The Church Street Bridge is a reinforced concrete arch bridge over both the Yarra River and Monash Freeway, located in the inner-eastern suburbs of Melbourne, in Victoria, Australia. Completed in 1923, the bridge links Church Street in Richmond, on the north bank of the river, with Chapel Street in South Yarra, on the south. The bridge carries motor vehicles, trams, pedestrians, and cyclists.

The bridge was added to the Victorian Heritage Register on 9 August 2001 in recognition of its historical and architectural significance.

== History ==
=== First bridge ===
The crossing between Chapel Street and Church Street was negotiated by a punt until a narrow single span iron box girder bridge was built in 1857. Purchased from the British government at the end of the Crimean War, this bridge had a 64-metre (210 ft) span with side trusses being solid riveted iron 3.0 metres (10 ft) high, designed to prevent Russian snipers from killing British troops. The bridge was dismantled and reconstructed with stone buttresses on the site. By the early twentieth century, the bridge was inadequate in terms of structure and traffic capacity, and an upgrade was needed to provide a connection for trams to cross the river.

=== Current bridge ===
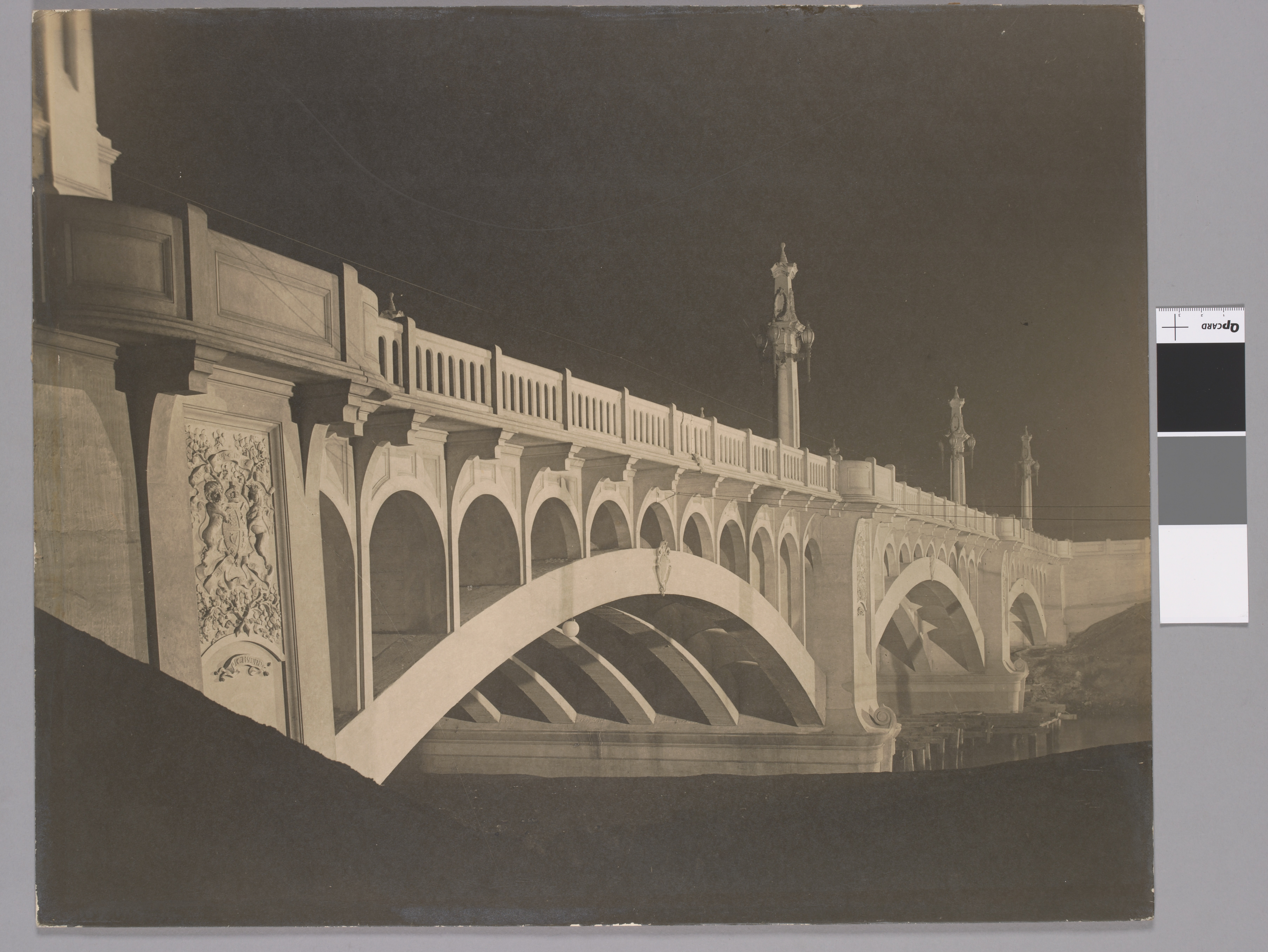
The bridge in 1924

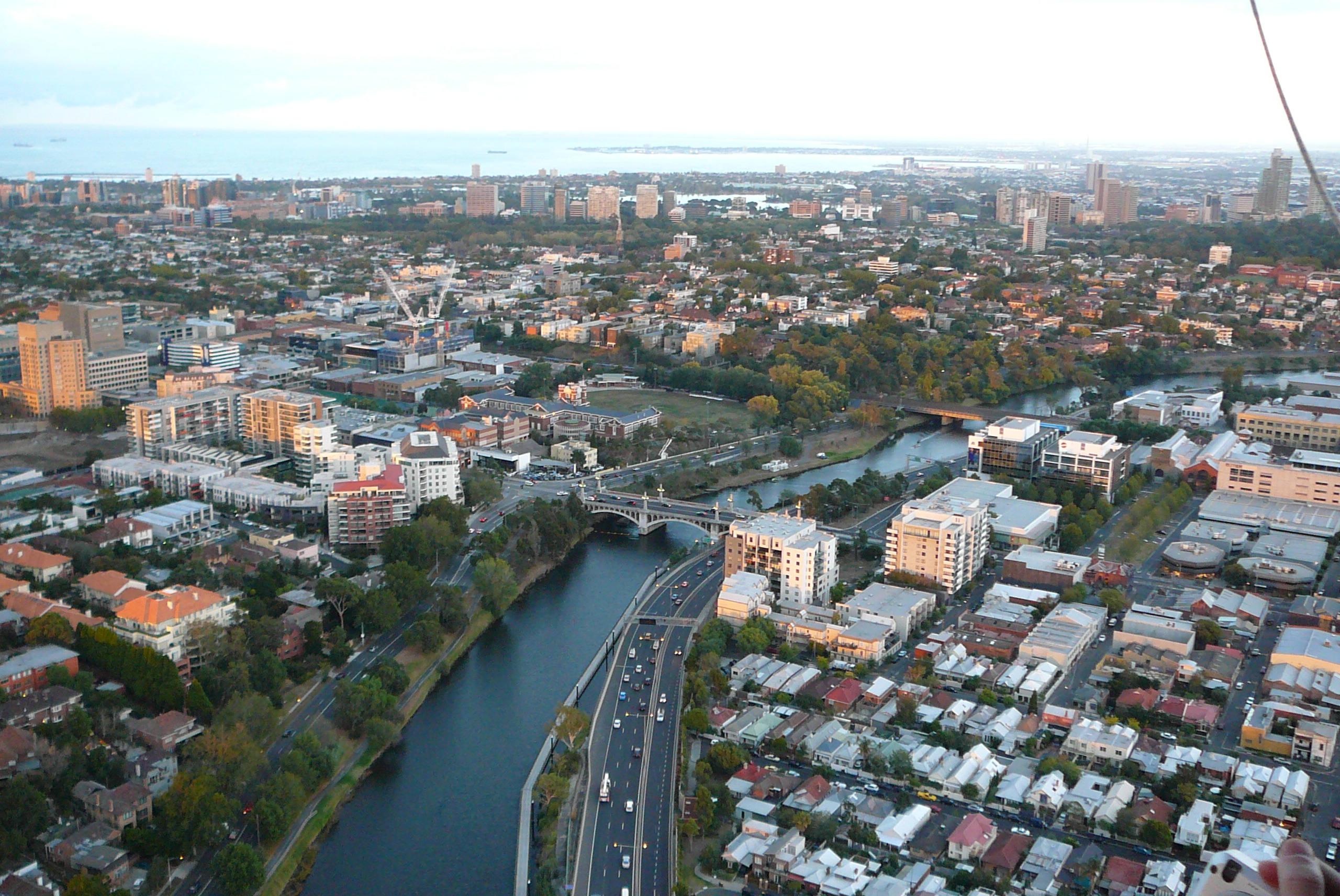
An aerial view of the bridge, looking downstream, with the Cremorne railway bridge in the background, 2007

Funded by contributions from the Prahran, Richmond and Melbourne City local government authorities, the Melbourne & Metropolitan Tramways Board, and the Victorian Government, the bridge was constructed under contracts issued jointly by the Prahran and Richmond Councils. Modelled on the Princes Bridge, the triple-arch bridge was designed by Harold Desbrowe-Annear, John Albert Laing was the supervising engineer, and was built by the Reinforced Concrete and Monier Pipe Construction Company. Three reinforced concrete arches were supported by piled foundations.

The bridge was officially opened by the Governor on 8 July 1924.

In the 1960s, the arches of northern span were rebuilt as part of the construction of the South Eastern Arterial. The river was diverted away from under the northern span, and the four-lane road was built there instead. As a result, the clearance available to traffic on the road underneath was reduced. In the late 1990s, the arch elements of this span were removed, and replaced by new structural elements that were 0.6 metres (2 ft 0 in) higher at the crown and 1.2 metres (3 ft 11 in) higher at either end. Specialised monitoring was required during the process to manage the changing loads on the elements of the bridge.

In January 2007 rehabilitation work was carried out by VicRoads, including waterproofing the concrete deck, replacing the tram tracks, and general resurfacing, and the bridge was closed to both vehicles and trams. Further work commenced in April 2007 and involved replacement of balustrades and new traffic barriers at the kerbs.

== Description ==
At the time of its construction, the bridge was 20 metres (66 ft) wide with a 13-metre-wide (44 ft) carriageway and two 3.4-metre-wide (11 ft) footpaths. The waterway was 91 metres (300 ft) wide to accommodate projected flood levels. When constructed, all three ribbed arch spans crossed the river, with the central span slightly wider for visual balance. The piers carry the coats of arms for both the State of Victoria and the City of Melbourne. The abutments carried the coats of arms for both the Prahran and Richmond local government authorities; however, were subsequently removed. Above each of the piers and abutments are lamp standards, which also support the overhead power supply for the tram line. Wreaths decorate the Ionic columns on the bridge's deck.

The bridge is traversed by Melbourne tram route 78.

The Main Yarra Trail and Capital City Trail pass underneath the northern and southern abutments of the bridge.

== See also ==
- Crossings of the Yarra River

Next bridge upstream	Yarra River	Next bridge downstream
MacRobertson Bridge (vehicles; pedestrians; cyclists)	Church Street Bridge	Cremorne railway bridge (railway)
