= Secrets of Our Cities =

Secrets of Our Cities is an Australian factual television show that looks at the history of Australian suburbs and towns. This observational documentary series began on the SBS on 26 September 2017. It follows Greig Pickhaver (also known as HG Nelson) uncovering the hidden history and unsung residents who have helped shape suburbs and towns into the places they are today. A second series began 22 February 2020.

== Episodes ==
=== Season 1 ===
- Season 1 Ep 1 "Fitzroy"
- Season 1 Ep 2 "Bondi"
- Season 1 Ep 3 "Fremantle"

=== Season 2 ===
- Season 2 Ep 1 "Gold Coast"
- Season 2 Ep 3 "Footscray"
- Season 2 Ep 2 "Kalgoorlie"
