= Zig Zag Bridge, Kew =

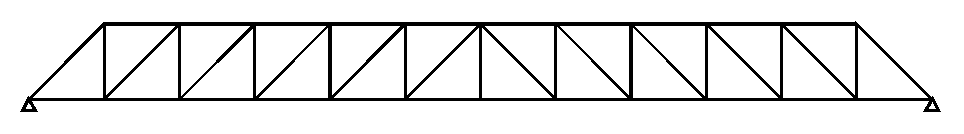
- Coordinates: 37.79591°0′0″S 145.0179°0′0″E
- Carried: Tramway, Pipeline and Pedestrians
- Crossed: Yarra River
- Locale: Melbourne, Australia

Characteristics
- Design: Howe Truss
- Material: Main span - Oregon (North American softwood) supported by piers of Mount Macedon hardwood.
- Total length: 238 metres (781 ft). A 40 metre main span connected to a 180m long viaduct on the Fairfield side.
- Width: 3.6 metres (12 ft)}

History
- Opened: 1864 (Tramway Bridge)
- Rebuilt: 1891 (Pedestrian Bridge)
- Demolished: 1929

Location
- Interactive map of Zig Zag Bridge, Kew

The Zig Zag Bridge was one of two successive bridges spanning the Yarra River between Kew and Fairfield, five kilometres (3.1 mi) east of Melbourne, Victoria, Australia.

Over a 65-year period, the two bridges served different purposes, largely connected to the nearby Kew Asylum —later known as Willsmere.

== Tramway bridge (1864-1870) ==
To assist with the building of Kew Asylum, a tramway was established to connect the bluestone quarries of Yarra Bend to the enormous building project in Kew.

The tramway was conceived by John Young (building contractor) and ran for approximately 2.5 km.

At the Yarra River, a Howe truss bridge crossed the water in a single span. The tramway was carried on a timber deck 17 metres above the normal river level. An American design partly of American timber, it is considered unusual for 1860s Melbourne.

== Pedestrian bridge and pipeline (1870-1891) ==
After the completion of Kew Asylum, the bridge served as a pedestrian link between the new institution and the one it intended to replace, Yarra Bend Asylum.

During the 1870s, the bridge also carried the first town water to Kew Asylum via Yarra Bend, however, this became redundant after the construction of the Fairfield Pipeline Bridge (1878).

The 'Great Flood' of 1891 brought significant damage to the already deteriorating bridge. It was removed and then replaced by a new design in early 1892.

== Zig Zag Bridge (1892-1929) ==
The Public Works Department designed a new bridge in the same location to a significantly different form.

The sole function was now pedestrians moving between the two institutions - Yarra Bend Asylum and Kew Asylum although it may have also been used by residents of Collingwood.

The deck height was about six metres lower than its predecessor and this necessitated a flight of stairs on the Kew side to reach the top of the bank. The lower Fairfield bank required three flights of stairs located inside a rectangular pier. This connected to a low level gangway.

The multiple flights of stairs and changes of direction resulted in the epithet "Zig Zag Bridge". Alterations occurred in 1910.

== Demise ==
After heavy damage in the flood of 1923, the final dismantling of Zig Zag bridge seems to have occurred in 1929 through the use of dynamite.

Subsequent landscaping and repurposing has removed almost all traces of the early bridges in addition to the original tramway.

== Revival ==
Zig Zag Bridge has been earmarked for rebuilding but so far never realised.

The 4.6 km stretch between Kane’s Bridge and the Pipeline Bridge is the longest absence of pedestrian connection between Port Phillip Bay and Ivanhoe.

In 1990, a government document - The Middle Yarra Concept Plan - detailed a rationale for revival.

In this report, the formation of a “Yarra Boulevard Trail” was proposed to run from the Fairfield Pipeline bridge to Collins Bridge (Gipps Street). The trail mainly on the Kew side also necessitated a link to the Yarra Bend side.

The report stated that a brand new bridge “would replace a historic bridge known as the Zig Zag bridge which was swept away by floodwaters. It should be constructed above the 1% flood level so that it would withstand flood flows without impeding them”.

On Map 20 and 22 of the report, a brand new “Zig Zag Bridge” was indicated about 250 metres upstream from its original location. The idea was to provide “limited access across the river” – “pedestrians and bicycles”.
