= Arthur Robins =

English footballer

Personal information
- Date of birth: 1888
- Place of birth: Northampton, England
- Date of death: 12 March 1924 (aged 35)
- Place of death: Pontefract, England
- Position: Outside right

Senior career*
Years	Team	Apps	(Gls)
- Raunds St Peters
1908–1910	Sheffield United	7	(0)
1910–1915	Castleford Town		
1919–1920	Castleford Town		

Managerial career
- 1911–1915: Castleford Town
- 1919–1924: Castleford Town
- * Club domestic league appearances and goals as of 16:24, 4 January 2012 (UTC)

Arthur Robins (1888 – 12 March 1924) was an English footballer who played as an Outside right for Sheffield United in the Football League.

== Career ==
Born in Northampton Robins begun his career at Raunds St Peters before transferring to The Blades in 1910. He was a regular for the reserves whilst at Bramall Lane but failed to make the breakthrough into the first team, making only a handful of appearances.

After being released by United he moved to Castleford Town, becoming player manager from 1911. With the outset of World War I and with Castleford dissolved for the duration he made a number of wartime guest appearances back at Sheffield United as well as appearing for Goole Town and Luton Town.

Following the war he returned to the re-formed Castleford Town in 1919 where he played a further season as player manager before retiring from playing in 1920 to remain as manager until his death in 1924.
