= Morell Bridge =

Bridge in Melbourne, Victoria, Australia

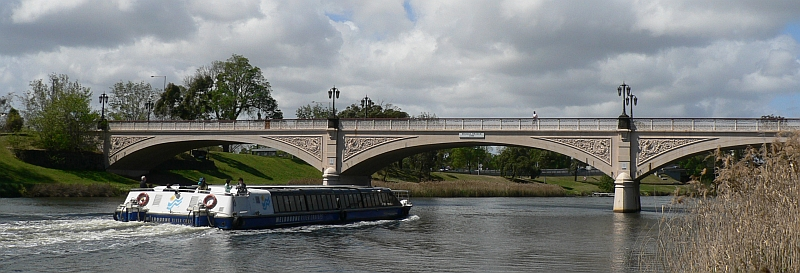
- Coordinates: 37°49′39.6″S 144°59′6″E
- Carries: Pedestrians and cyclists
- Crosses: Yarra River
- Locale: Melbourne, Victoria, Australia
- Begins: Royal Botanic Gardens
- Ends: Olympic Park
- Other name: Anderson Street bridge
- Named for: Sir Stephen Morell
- Preceded by: Hoddle Bridge
- Followed by: Swan Street Bridge

Characteristics
- Design: Arch bridge
- Material: Reinforced concrete
- Pier construction: Concrete
- No. of spans: 3

History
- Designer: W. G. Baltzer
- Contracted lead designer: Carter Gummow & Co.
- Engineering design by: John Monash; John Anderson
- Opened: 1899; 127 years ago

Victorian Heritage Register
- Official name: Morell Bridge
- Type: Registered place
- Designated: 20 August 1982
- Reference no.: H1440
- Heritage overlay no.: HO395
- Category: Transport – Road

Register of the National Estate
- Official name: Morell Road (sic.) Bridge
- Type: Defunct register
- Designated: 21 March 1978
- Reference no.: 5231

Location
- Interactive map of Morell Bridge

The Morell Bridge is an arch bridge over the Yarra River in South Yarra, Melbourne, Victoria, Australia. Completed in 1899 by John Monash and John Anderson, it is notable as the first bridge in Victoria that was built using reinforced concrete.

The bridge was added to the Victorian Heritage Register on 20 August 1982 in recognition of its architectural, aesthetic and historical significance; and, on 21 March 1978, was added to the now defunct Register of the National Estate.

== Description ==
It features decorations on the three arch spans, including large dragon motifs and ornamental Victorian lights. The gutters on the bridge are cobbled bluestone, with a single lane bitumen strip running down the middle.

Originally known as the Anderson Street bridge, it was named the Morell Bridge in 1936 after Sir Stephen Morell, a prominent Victorian businessman and Lord Mayor of Melbourne between 1926 and 1928.

On 7 June 1998 the bridge was closed to motor vehicles as part of the CityLink project. It is currently used by cyclist and pedestrian traffic, connecting the Royal Botanic Gardens to the Olympic Park precinct.

In 2009, Engineers Australia awarded the bridge an Engineering Heritage Marker as part of its Engineering Heritage Recognition Program.

== See also ==
- Crossings of the Yarra River

Next bridge upstream	Yarra River	Next bridge downstream
Hoddle Bridge (vehicles; pedestrians; cyclists)	Morell Bridge	Swan Street Bridge (vehicles; pedestrians; cyclists)
