= Cremorne Railway Bridge =

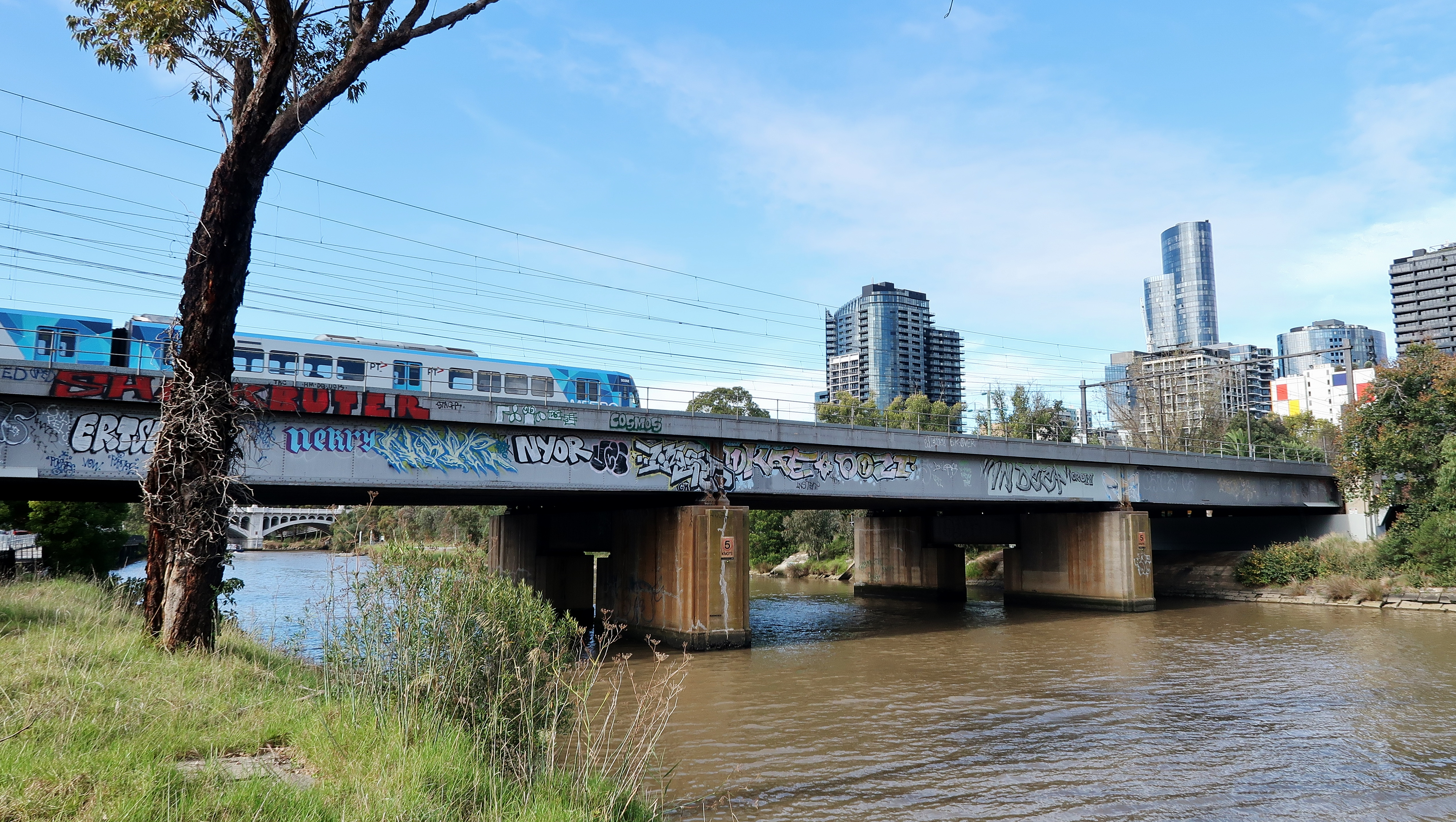
- The bridge in 2022
- Coordinates: 37°50′1″S 144°59′36″E
- Carries: – Frankston, Pakenham, Cranbourne, Sandringham lines
- Crosses: Yarra River
- Locale: Melbourne, Victoria, Australia
- Begins: South Yarra
- Ends: Richmond
- Named for: Cremorne
- Owner: Department of Transport and Planning
- Preceded by: Church Street Bridge
- Followed by: Hoddle Bridge

Characteristics
- Design: Girder bridge
- Material: Steel

Rail characteristics
- No. of tracks: 6
- Track gauge: Standard gauge

History
- Designer: Melbourne and Suburban Railway Company
- Opened: 1946; 80 years ago
- Replaces: 1860 and 1886 bridges

Location
- Interactive map of Cremorne Railway Bridge

The Cremorne Railway Bridge is a girder railway bridge that carries the Melbourne railway network across the Yarra River and connects the Richmond and South Yarra stations in the inner-eastern suburbs of Melbourne, in Victoria, Australia. Completed in 1946, the Frankston, Pakenham, Cranbourne, and Sandringham railway lines all use the bridge.

== History ==
Former bridges

The first bridge on the site was an imposing wrought iron lattice double-track girder bridge, built by the Melbourne and Suburban Railway Company and opened on 22 December 1860. In 1886, the bridge was duplicated as a second double-track bridge was opened alongside the first, thereby allowing a four-track section of line to be provided between Richmond and South Yarra.

The cost of the bridges, together with the cost of the Hawthorn Railway Bridge, were contributing factors that eventually led to the financial demise of the Melbourne and Suburban Railway Company.

Current bridge

The present bridge was opened in 1946. It accommodated three pairs of tracks between Richmond and South Yarra, although the two extra tracks were not constructed until 1960.

== Gallery ==
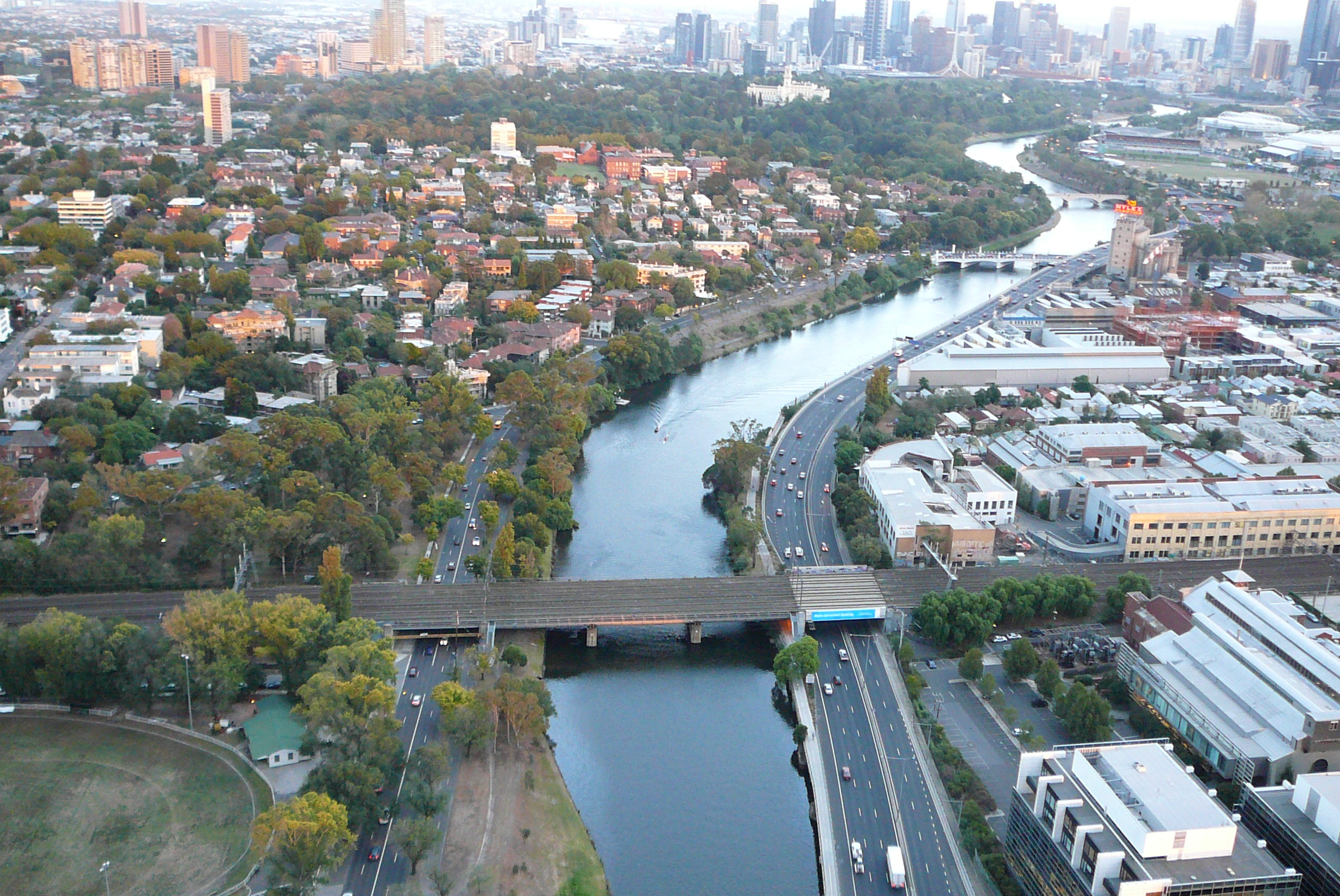
An aerial view of the bridge, looking downstream, with the Hoddle and Morell bridges in the mid-ground, 2007

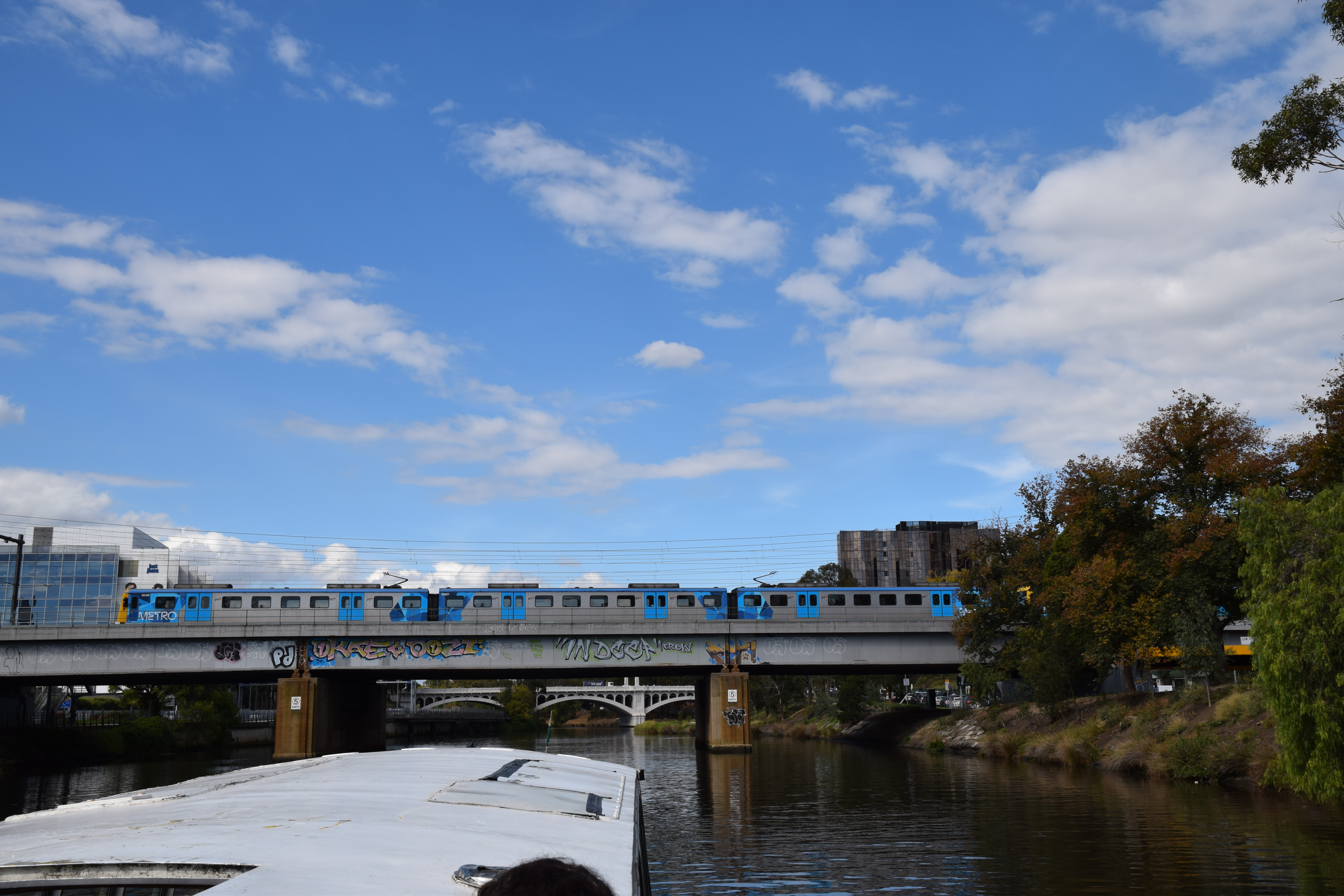
A Siemens Nexas suburban 3-car train on the bridge, 2016

== See also ==
- Crossings of the Yarra River

Next bridge upstream	Yarra River	Next bridge downstream
Church Street Bridge (trams; vehicles; pedestrians; cyclists)	Cremorne Railway Bridge	Hoddle Bridge (vehicles; pedestrians; cyclists)
