= Results of the 2022 Tasmanian local elections =

This is a list of local government area results for the 2022 Tasmanian local elections.

== Break O'Day ==
2022 Tasmanian local elections: Break O'Day
Party	Candidate	Votes	%	±%
Independent	Mick Tucker (elected)	1,267	26.63	
Independent	Janet Drummond (elected)	711	14.95	
Independent	Gary Barnes (elected)	376	7.90	
Greens	Liz Johnstone (elected)	329	6.92	
Independent	Kristi Chapple (elected)	289	6.08	
Independent	Ian Carter (elected)	271	5.70	
Independent	Vaughan Oldham (elected)	227	4.77	
Independent Labor	Kylie Wright (elected)	209	4.39	
Independent	Barry LeFevre (elected)	202	4.25	
Independent	Stephen Walley	187	3.93	
Independent	Lesa Whittaker	160	3.36	
Independent	Tim Gowans	141	2.96	
Independent	Cindy Kurtukoff	120	2.52	
Independent	John LeFevre	85	1.79	
Independent	Russell Montgomery	76	1.60	
Independent	Rosina Gallace	45	0.95	
Independent	Bob Hoogland	31	0.65	
Independent	Randy James Wilson	31	0.65	
Total formal votes		4,757	97.14	
Informal votes		140	2.86	
Turnout		4,897	84.50	

== Brighton ==
2022 Tasmanian local elections: Brighton
Party	Candidate	Votes	%	±%
Independent Liberal	Leigh Gray (elected)	3,053	29.41	
Independent	Barbara Curran (elected)	1,561	15.04	
Independent	Phil Owen (elected)	1,471	14.17	
Independent	Greg Irons (elected)	885	8.53	
Independent One Nation	Tennille Murtagh (elected)	864	8.32	
Independent Labor	Aaron De La Torre (elected)	701	6.75	
Independent	Michael Whelan (elected)	458	4.41	
Independent	Peter Geard (elected)	380	3.66	
Independent	Kellyanne Williams	363	3.50	
Independent	John McMaster (elected)	330	3.18	
Greens	Jack Cavanagh	315	3.03	
Total formal votes		10,381	96.86	
Informal votes		336	3.14	
Turnout		10,717	78.41	

== Burnie ==
2022 Tasmanian local elections: Burnie
Party	Candidate	Votes	%	±%
Independent	Teeny Brumby (elected)	2,201	18.55	
Independent Labor	Steve Kons (elected)	1,573	13.26	
Independent	Giovanna Simpson (elected)	1,318	11.11	
Independent	Trent Aitkin (elected)	1,061	8.94	
Independent Labor	Chris Lynch (elected)	1,000	8.43	
Independent	David Pease (elected)	917	7.73	
Independent Labor	Amina Keygan (elected)	749	6.31	
Independent	Ken Dorsey (elected)	699	5.89	
Independent	Alvwyn Boyd	608	5.12	
Independent	Justin Grave (elected)	565	4.76	
Independent	Craig Hensley	395	3.33	
Independent	Ryan Gilmour	286	2.41	
Greens	Ceilidh Newbury	255	2.15	
Independent	Jarrod Boys	240	2.02	
Total formal votes		11,867	97.06	
Informal votes		359	2.94	
Turnout		12,226	80.84	
Party total votes
Independent		8,290	69.87	
Independent Labor		3,322	27.99	
Greens		255	2.15	

== Central Coast ==
2022 Tasmanian local elections: Central Coast
Party	Candidate	Votes	%	±%
Independent	Cheryl Fuller (elected)	2,611	17.97	
Independent Liberal	Garry Carpenter (elected)	2,386	16.42	
Independent	Casey Hiscutt (elected)	822	5.66	
Independent Labor	Amanda Diprose (elected)	716	4.93	
Independent	Michael Smith (elected)	706	4.86	
Independent	John Beswick (elected)	647	4.45	
Independent	Philip Viney (elected)	606	4.17	
Greens	Darren Briggs	602	4.14	
Independent	Kate Wylie (elected)	536	3.69	
Independent JLN	Sophie Lehmann (elected)	521	3.59	
Independent	Patrick Fabian	517	3.56	
Independent	Greg Wing	471	3.24	
Independent	Ariele Ackland	429	2.95	
Independent	Andrew van Rooyen	424	2.92	
Independent	Damien McCulloch	387	2.66	
Independent	Micheline Andrews	352	2.42	
Independent	Stephen Jackson	300	2.06	
Independent	Bill Hutcheson	257	1.77	
Independent	Lyndon O'Neil	207	1.42	
Independent	Dianne Kurrle	206	1.42	
Independent	Matt Kelly	150	1.03	
Independent	Gaye Bryan	139	0.96	
Independent	Justine Brooks	137	0.94	
Independent	Darrell Jeffrey	129	0.89	
Independent	Garth Johnston	115	0.79	
Independent	Adam Moller	83	0.57	
Independent	David Robinson	73	0.50	
Total formal votes		14,529	95.75	
Informal votes		645	4.25	
Turnout		15,174	85.25	

== Central Highlands ==
2022 Tasmanian local elections: Central Highlands
Party	Candidate	Votes	%	±%
Independent	Loueen Triffitt (elected)	728	36.18	
Independent	Jim Allwright (elected)	298	14.81	
Independent	Tony Bailey (elected)	159	7.90	
Independent	John Hall (elected)	143	7.11	
Independent	Robert Cassidy (elected)	134	6.66	
Independent	David Meacheam (elected)	112	5.57	
Independent	Julie Honner (elected)	109	5.42	
Independent	Rob Wilkinson	106	5.27	
Independent	Scott Bowden (elected)	104	5.17	
Independent	Yvonne Miller (elected)	75	3.73	
Independent	Anthony Archer	44	2.19	
Total formal votes		2,012	96.27	
Informal votes		78	3.73	
Turnout		2,090	83.63	

== Circular Head ==
2022 Tasmanian local elections: Circular Head
Party	Candidate	Votes	%	±%
Independent	Gerard Blizzard (elected)	828	18.12	
Independent	Anette Dawes (elected)	800	17.51	
Independent Liberal	John Oldaker (elected)	550	12.04	
Independent	Sally Collins (elected)	376	8.23	
Independent	Ashley Popowski (elected)	361	7.90	
Independent	Steve Pilkington (elected)	313	6.85	
Independent JLN	Rodney Flowers (elected)	271	5.93	
Independent	Mark Dabner (elected)	227	4.97	
Independent	Tony Hine (elected)	225	4.92	
Independent	Melissa Wells	225	4.92	
Independent	John McNab	219	4.79	
Independent	Isaac Long	128	2.80	
Independent	Ian Heres	47	1.03	
Total formal votes		4,570	97.58	
Informal votes		113	2.41	
Turnout		4,683	82.24	

== Clarence ==
2022 Tasmanian local elections: Clarence
Party	Candidate	Votes	%	±%
Independent	Tony Mulder (elected)	4,114	11.57	
Better Clarence	Brendan Blomeley (elected)	4,078	11.47	
Independent Labor	Heather Chong (elected)	3,015	8.48	
Better Clarence	Allison Ritchie (elected)	2,698	7.59	
Greens	Beth Warren (elected)	2,332	6.56	
Independent	Wendy Kennedy (elected)	2,257	6.35	
Independent	Bree Hunter (elected)	1,813	5.10	
Greens	Jade Darko (elected)	1,738	4.89	
Independent Labor	Daniel Hulme (elected)	1,376	3.87	
Independent	Richard James (elected)	1,254	3.53	
Independent One Nation	Emma Goyne (elected)	1,201	3.38	
Independent	John Peers	1,094	3.08	
Independent Liberal	James Walker (elected)	997	2.80	
Independent Labor	Kate Rainbird	977	2.75	
Independent Local	Anna Bateman	930	2.61	
Independent	Matt Combey	871	2.45	
Independent	Simon Walker	663	1.86	
Independent	Dave Tilley	609	1.71	
Independent	Andrew Jenner	583	1.64	
Independent	Sharyn von Bertouch	566	1.59	
Independent	Hans Willink	547	1.54	
Independent	BJ Walker	520	1.46	
Independent	Jimmy Collins	450	1.27	
Better Clarence	Kaye McPherson	295	0.83	
Better Clarence	Anthony James	271	0.76	
Independent	Mike Figg	208	0.58	
Better Clarence	Noelle Harb	110	0.31	
Total formal votes		35,567	95,27	
Informal votes		1,765	4.73	
Turnout		37,332	83.51	
Party total votes
Independent		15,549	43.72	
Better Clarence		7,452	20.95	
Independent Labor		5,368	15.09	
Greens		4,070	11.45	
Independent One Nation		1,201	3.38	
Independent Liberal		997	2.80	
Independent Local		930	2.61	

== Derwent Valley ==
2022 Tasmanian local elections: Derwent Valley
Party	Candidate	Votes	%	±%
Independent Labor	Michelle Dracoulis (elected)	1,508	23.51	
Independent	Luke Browning (elected)	780	12.16	
Independent	Jessica Cosgrove (elected)	462	7.20	
Independent Liberal	Peter Binny (elected)	456	7.11	
Independent	Phillip Bingley (elected)	401	6.25	
Independent Liberal	Justin Derksen (elected)	397	6.19	
Independent	Matt Hill (elected)	334	5.21	
Independent	James Graham	302	4.71	
Independent	Phillip Bigg	295	4.60	
Independent	Sara Lowe (elected)	293	4.57	
Greens	Heather Chaplin	250	3.90	
Independent	Wayne Shoobridge	209	3.26	
Independent	Brody Wiggins	169	2.63	
Independent	Natasha Woods	138	2.15	
Independent Labor	Deb Carnes	122	1.90	
Independent Labor	Liz Virtue	121	1.89	
Independent Labor	Brett Maryniak	117	1.82	
Independent	Eve Nelson	60	0.94	
Total formal votes		6,414	95.92	
Informal votes		273	4.08	
Turnout		6,687	80.10	
Party total votes
Independent		3,443	53.68	
Independent Labor		1,868	29.12	
Independent Liberal		853	13.30	
Greens		250	3.90	

== Devonport ==
2022 Tasmanian local elections: Devonport
Party	Candidate	Votes	%	±%
Independent National	Steve Martin (elected)	3,093	20.42	
Independent	Alison Jarman (elected)	2,461	16.25	
Independent Liberal	Leigh Murphy (elected)	1,548	10.22	
Independent	Gerard Enniss (elected)	1,503	9.92	
Independent	Damien Viney (elected)	1,203	7.94	
Independent Liberal	Stacey Sheehan (elected)	1,024	6.76	
Independent	Alison Moore (elected)	932	6.15	
Independent	Peter Hollister (elected)	885	5.84	
Independent	Janene Wilczynski (elected)	848	5.60	
Greens	Tammy Milne	673	4.44	
Greens	Petra Wildren	532	3.51	
Independent	Kent Townsend	446	2.94	
Total formal votes		15,148	95.95	
Informal votes		640	4.05	
Turnout		15,788	79.62	
Party total votes
Independent		8,278	54.65	
Independent National		3,093	20.42	
Independent Liberal		2,572	16.98	
Greens		1,205	7.95	

== Dorset ==
2022 Tasmanian local elections: Dorset
Party	Candidate	Votes	%	±%
Independent Liberal	Greg Howard (elected)	1,159	25.25	
Independent	Beth Donoghue (elected)	653	14.23	
Independent	Kahlia Simmons (elected)	400	8.71	
Independent	Anna Coxen (elected)	317	6.91	
Independent	Edwina Powell (elected)	300	6.54	
Independent	Jerrod Nichols (elected)	293	6.38	
Independent	Dale Jessup (elected)	289	6.30	
Independent	Leonie Stein (elected)	261	5.69	
Independent	Nick Bicanic	208	4.53	
Independent	Mervyn Chilcott (elected)	159	3.46	
Independent	Wendy McLennan	157	3.42	
Independent	Karlene Cuthbertson	140	3.05	
Independent	Jan Hughes	105	2.29	
Independent	James Cashion	93	2.03	
Independent	Vincent Teichmann	56	1.22	
Total formal votes		4,590	97.56	
Informal votes		115	2.44	
Turnout		4,705	84.97	

== Flinders ==
2022 Tasmanian local elections: Flinders
Party	Candidate	Votes	%	±%
Independent	Rachel Summers (elected)	251	35.75	
Independent	Carol Denise Cox (elected)	100	14.25	
Independent	Peter Rhodes (elected)	94	13.39	
Independent	Vanessa Grace (elected)	79	11.25	
Independent	Aaron Burke (elected)	50	7.12	
Independent	Garry Blenkhorn (elected)	48	6.84	
Independent	Ken Stockton (elected)	41	5.84	
Independent	Linda Nicol	22	3.13	
Independent	Chris Rhodes	17	2.42	
Total formal votes		702	99.29	
Informal votes		5	0.71	
Turnout		707	84.77	

== George Town ==
2022 Tasmanian local elections: George Town
Party	Candidate	Votes	%	±%
Independent Liberal	Greg Kieser (elected)	794	17.36	
Independent	Simone Lowe (elected)	693	15.15	
Independent	Greg Dawson (elected)	507	11.09	
Independent	Tim Harris (elected)	391	8.55	
Independent	Winston Mason (elected)	346	7.57	
Independent	Heather Barwick (elected)	342	7.48	
Independent	Jason Orr (elected)	293	6.41	
Independent	Winston Archer (elected)	213	4.66	
Independent	Heather Ashley (elected)	199	4.35	
Independent	Brent Daire	176	3.85	
Independent	Dean Gibbons	151	3.30	
Independent	Peter Parkes	137	3.00	
Independent	Ann Williams-Fitzgerald	86	1.88	
Independent	Quade Geale	82	1.79	
Independent	Bec Sarah Jane Stuttard	60	1.31	
Independent	Peter Schultz	45	0.98	
Independent	David Griffiths	43	0.94	
Independent	Ven Grollmus	15	0.33	
Total formal votes		4,573	96.35	
Informal votes		173	3.65	
Turnout		4,879	85.45	

== Glamorgan–Spring Bay ==
2022 Tasmanian local elections: Glamorgan–Spring Bay
Party	Candidate	Votes	%	±%
Independent	Cheryl Arnol (elected)	729	19.27	+6.34
Independent	Michael Symons (elected)	546	14.43	+2.39
Independent	Jenny Woods (elected)	516	13.64	+9.57
Independent	Robert Forbes-Young (elected)	498	13.16	
Independent	Neil (Teddy) Edwards (elected)	349	9.22	
Independent	Greg Luck (elected)	301	7.95	
Independent	Rob Churchill (elected)	193	5.10	+3.36
Independent Labor	Carole McQueeney (elected)	190	5.02	
Independent	Annie Browning	151	3.99	−0.44
Independent	Kenneth Gregson	128	3.38	+1.84
Independent	Richard Parker	112	2.96	+1.53
Independent	Pat Gadd	71	1.88	
Total formal votes		3,784	97.28	
Informal votes		106	2.72	
Turnout		3,890	88.88	

== Glenorchy ==
2022 Tasmanian local elections: Glenorchy
Party	Candidate	Votes	%	±%
Independent	Bec Thomas (elected)	7,465	29.27	+26.81
Independent	Sue Hickey (elected)	3,932	15.42	
Independent	Kelly Sims (elected)	2,191	8.59	+6.31
Greens	Molly Kendall (elected)	1,412	5.54	
Independent Liberal	Josh Cockshutt (elected)	943	3.70	
Independent	Jan Dunsby (elected)	851	3.34	+1.49
Independent	Harry Quick (elected)	803	3.15	+0.72
Independent	Morris Malone	803	3.15	
Independent	Aris Grafanakis	714	2.80	
Independent	Shane Alderton	687	2.69	
Independent	Stuart Slade (elected)	643	2.52	
Independent	Steven King (elected)	631	2.47	−0.72
Independent	Ali Sawyer	628	2.46	
Independent	Russell Yaxley (elected)	586	2.30	
Independent	Jenny Branch-Allen	555	2.18	+0.28
Independent	Peter Ridler	487	1.91	
Independent	Bhavika Sharma	379	1.49	
Independent	Nic Edmondson	378	1.48	
Independent	Mala Crew	336	1.32	
Independent	Michael Hangan	315	1.24	−0.40
Independent	Md Imadul Islam Rahat	237	0.93	
Independent	Tim Marks	227	0.89	
Independent	Matt Haubrick	155	0.61	
Independent	Philip Fraser	148	0.58	
Total formal votes		25,506	94.84	+0.11
Informal votes		1,388	5.16	−0.11
Turnout		26,894	82.73	+27.94

== Hobart ==
2022 Tasmanian local elections: Hobart
Party	Candidate	Votes	%	±%
Your Hobart Independents	Anna Reynolds (elected)	4,266	13.89	
Independent	John Kelly (elected)	4,067	13.24	
Independent	Marti Zucco (elected)	2,150	7.00	
Independent	Louise Elliot (elected)	1,824	5.94	
Greens	Helen Burnet (elected)	1,529	4.98	
Independent Liberal	Louise Bloomfield (elected)	1,473	4.80	
Independent Liberal	Simon Behrakis (elected)	1,448	4.72	
Your Hobart Independents	Mike Dutta (elected)	1,230	4.01	
Greens	Bill Harvey (elected)	1,219	3.97	
Independent Labor	Ryan Posselt (elected)	1,016	3.31	
Independent	Ben Lohberger (elected)	936	3.05	
Independent	Jax Fox	838	2.73	
Your Hobart Independents	Zelinda Sherlock (elected)	656	2.14	
Your Hobart Independents	Kate Kelly	646	2.10	
Independent	Jeff Briscoe	605	1.97	
Our Hobart	Marcus Bai	572	1.86	
Your Hobart Independents	Brian Corr	500	1.63	
Independent Liberal	Will Coats	486	1.58	
Independent	Damon Thomas	459	1.49	
Greens	Gemma Kitsos	428	1.39	
Your Hobart Independents	Matt Etherington	373	1.21	
Independent	Steven Phipps	350	1.14	
Greens	Bec Taylor	321	1.05	
Greens	Nathan Volf	281	0.92	
Independent	Debra Thurley	270	0.88	
Independent	Edwin Johnstone	268	0.87	
Your Hobart Independents	Juniper Shaw	258	0.84	
Independent Liberal	James McKee	256	0.83	
Our Hobart	Ron Christie	241	0.78	
Independent	Yang Liu	225	0.73	
Independent	Sam Campbell	213	0.69	
Your Hobart Independents	Raj Chopra	169	0.55	
Ind. Liberal Democrat	Duncan Spender	157	0.51	
Independent	Tiina Sexton	137	0.45	
Our Hobart	Lili Christie	131	0.43	
Independent Liberal	Daniel Geng	127	0.41	
Independent Liberal	Stefan Vogel	115	0.37	
Independent	Jono Stagg	108	0.35	
Independent	Michael Jackson	99	0.32	
Our Hobart	Ling Ling Gao	76	0.25	
Independent	Joe Grech	72	0.23	
Our Hobart	Owen Davies	42	0.14	
Our Hobart	Karen Rothery	39	0.13	
Independent	Cadence Mitchell	32	0.10	
Total formal votes		30,708	96.70	
Informal votes		1,047	3.30	
Turnout		31,755	82.38	
Party total votes
Independent		12,653	41.21	
Your Hobart Independents		8,098	26.37	
Independent Liberal		3,905	12.72	
Greens		3,778	12.30	
Our Hobart		1,101	3.59	
Independent Labor		1,016	3.31	
Independent Liberal Democrat		157	0.51	
Party total seats			Seats	±
Independent			4	
Your Hobart Independents			3	
Greens			2	
Independent Liberal			2	
Independent Labor			1	

== Huon Valley ==
2022 Tasmanian local elections: Huon Valley
Party	Candidate	Votes	%	±%
Independent Labor	Toby Thorpe (elected)	1,534	13.47	
Independent	Sally Doyle (elected)	1,453	12.76	
Greens	Paul Gibson (elected)	1,250	10.98	
Independent	Debbie Armstrong (elected)	709	6.23	
Independent	Mike Wilson (elected)	648	5.69	
Independent	Mark Jessop (elected)	614	5.39	
Independent	Marshall Callaghan	570	5.01	
Independent	David O'Neill	508	4.46	
Greens	Jenny Chambers-Smith (elected)	460	4.04	
Independent	Cathy Temby (elected)	450	3.95	
Independent	Malcolm Thomas	412	3.62	
Independent	Denny Bryan	401	3.52	
Independent	Geoffrey Swan	398	3.50	
Independent	Amy Robertson	285	2.50	
Independent	Joshua Bowling	277	2.47	
Independent	Andrew Burgess	263	2.31	
Independent	Shane Johnson	232	2.04	
Greens	Lukas Mrosek	179	1.57	
Independent	John Ryan	178	1.56	
Independent	Cameron Smith	134	1.34	
Independent	Carol Hurst	111	0.97	
Ind. Animal Justice	Mary Coulson	98	0.86	
Independent	Sarah Horner	95	0.83	
Independent	Amanda Richter	69	0.61	
Independent	Janine Koefoed	58	0.58	
Total formal votes		11,386	95.42	
Informal votes		547	4.58	
Turnout		12,209	86.14	

== Kentish ==
2022 Tasmanian local elections: Kentish
Party	Candidate	Votes	%	±%
Independent	Kate Haberle (elected)	1042	24.93	
Independent	Penny Lane (elected)	843	20.17	
Independent	Phillip Richards (elected)	569	13.62	
Independent	Don Thwaites (elected)	526	12.59	
Independent	Rodney Blenkhorn (elected)	331	7.92	
Independent	Linda Cassidy (elected)	284	6.80	
Independent	Terry Hughes (elected)	181	4.33	
Independent	Simone Haigh (elected)	170	4.07	
Independent	Phil Dickinson (elected)	137	3.28	
Independent	Bob Simmons	96	2.30	
Total formal votes		4,179	96.20	
Informal votes		165	3.80	
Turnout		4,439	86.41	

== King Island ==
One vacancy was not filled and a by-election was held on 27 October 2022.

2022 Tasmanian local elections: King Island
Party	Candidate	Votes	%	±%
Independent	Ian Allan (elected)	unopposed		
Independent	Marcus Blackie (elected)	unopposed		
Independent	David Bowden (elected)	unopposed		
Independent	Ira Cooke (elected)	unopposed		
Independent	Gina Green (elected)	unopposed		
Independent	Sarina Laidler (elected)	unopposed		
Independent	Duncan McFie (elected)	unopposed		
Independent	Vernon Philbey (elected)	unopposed		
Registered electors		1,179		

== Kingborough ==
2022 Tasmanian local elections: Kingborough
Party	Candidate	Votes	%	±%
Independent Labor	Paula Wriedt (elected)	5,503	23.67	+16.34
Independent	Aldo Antolli (elected)	2,438	10.49	
Independent	Mark Richardson (elected)	2,155	9.27	
Greens	Gideon Cordover (elected)	2,063	8.88	+6.32
Kingborough Thrives	Clare Glade-Wright (elected)	1,946	8.37	
Independent	Kaspar Deane (elected)	1,936	8.33	
Greens	Amanda Midgley (elected)	1,079	4.64	−0.42
Independent	Christian Street (elected)	941	4.05	+0.97
Independent	David Bain (elected)	911	3.92	
Independent	Flora Fox (elected)	877	3.77	−0.62
Kingborough Thrives	Jill Hickie	803	3.45	
Kingborough Thrives	Di Carter	767	3.30	
Independent	David McQuillan	592	2.55	
Independent	Kate Lucas	493	2.12	+0.96
Independent	Michael Rowan	461	1.98	
Independent	Alex Jensen	279	1.20	
Total formal votes		23,244	96.58	+1.40
Informal votes		824	3.42	−1.40
Turnout		24,068	86.32	+28.67

== Latrobe ==
2022 Tasmanian local elections: Latrobe
Party	Candidate	Votes	%	±%
Independent	Peter Freshney (elected)	2,915	36.21	−3.75
Independent	Vonette Mead (elected)	930	11.55	+0.94
Independent	Graeme Brown (elected)	899	11.17	+0.36
Independent	Sommer Metske (elected)	492	6.11	−4.12
Independent Liberal	Jacki Martin (elected)	438	5.44	
Independent	Gerrad Wicks (elected)	392	4.87	+0.16
Independent	Claudia Baldock (elected)	325	4.04	
Independent	Gina Timms	286	3.55	
Independent	David Fidler (elected)	268	3.33	
Independent	Lucy Gorniak	234	2.91	
Independent	Garry Sims (elected)	228	2.83	−0.94
Independent	Chris Hawkins	192	2.38	
Independent	Lesley Young	169	2.10	−0.25
Independent	Grant Goodwin	162	2.01	
Independent	Ralph Brinkmann	121	1.50	
Total formal votes		8,051	96.83	−0.46
Informal votes		264	3.17	+0.46
Turnout		8,315	87.06	+27.11

== Launceston ==
2022 Tasmanian local elections: Launceston
Party	Candidate	Votes	%	±%
Independent	Danny Gibson (elected)	5,894	15.68	+11.09
Independent	Matthew Garwood (elected)	3,387	9.01	
Independent	George Razay (elected)	2,538	6.75	
Independent	Joe Pentridge (elected)	2,494	6.64	
Independent	Tim Walker (elected)	1,729	4.60	+1.86
Independent	Hugh McKenzie (elected)	1,665	4.43	+1.06
Independent	Alan Harris (elected)	1,642	4.37	+1.55
Independent	Andrea Dawkins (elected)	1,593	4.24	−0.50
Independent	Lindi McMahon (elected)	1,576	4.19	
Independent	Susie Cai (elected)	1,570	4.18	
Independent	Andrew Palmer (elected)	1,444	3.84	
Greens	Cecily Rosol	1,227	3.27	
Independent	Alex Britton (elected)	1,030	2.74	
Independent	Jacob Gelston	993	2.64	
Independent	Paul Spencer	936	2.49	−0.98
Independent	Thane Brady	835	2.22	−1.01
Independent	Tenille Pentland	740	1.97	
Independent	Bob Salt	739	1.97	−0.07
Independent	Krista Preece	624	1.66	+0.44
Independent	Bruce Potter	525	1.40	−0.82
Independent	Geoff Brayford	516	1.37	
Independent	Ross Marsden	503	1.34	
Independent	Kirsten Ritchie	431	1.15	
Independent	Tim Gunton	401	1.07	
Independent	Owen Tilbury	393	1.05	
Independent	Andrew Lovitt	379	1.01	
Independent	Steve Saunders	366	0.97	
Independent	Sam Hay	351	0.93	
Independent	Adrian Barrett	256	0.68	
Independent	Nelson Tabe	254	0.68	
Independent	Jarad Murray	236	0.63	
Independent	John Suitor	203	0.54	
Independent	Fenella Edwards	108	0.29	
Total formal votes		37,578	94.86	+2.83
Informal votes		2,036	5.14	−2.83
Turnout		39,614	82.32	+28.85

== Meander Valley ==
2022 Tasmanian local elections: Meander Valley
Party	Candidate	Votes	%	±%
Independent	Wayne Johnston (elected)	2,961	23.15	−0.03
Independent	Lochie Dornauf (elected)	1,655	12.94	
Independent Liberal	Stephanie Cameron (elected)	1,431	11.19	+1.55
Independent Labor	Ben Dudman (elected)	792	6.19	
Independent	Anne-Marie Loader (elected)	673	5.26	
Independent	Barry Lee (elected)	671	5.25	
Independent	Daniel Smedley	634	4.96	
Independent	Kevin House (elected)	609	4.76	
Independent	John Temple (elected)	513	4.01	−1.96
Independent	Rodney Synfield	458	3.58	+0.57
Independent	Michael Kelly (elected)	422	3.30	−4.66
Independent	Linda Poulton	372	2.91	
Greens	Mitch Houghton	312	2.44	
Independent	Deborah White	310	2.42	−3.43
Independent	Elizabeth Douglass	202	1.58	+0.50
Independent	Richie Fellows	175	1.37	
Independent	Christine Cronshaw	158	1.24	−0.10
Independent	James Redgrave	139	1.09	
Independent	Peter Wileman	132	1.03	
Independent	Dan Probert	88	0.69	
Independent	Justin Robinson	86	0.67	
Total formal votes		12,793	95.31	−1.51
Informal votes		629	4.69	+1.51
Turnout		13,422	86.30	+30.49

== Northern Midlands ==
2022 Tasmanian local elections: Northern Midlands
Party	Candidate	Votes	%	±%
Independent	Mary Knowles (elected)	1,007	11.37	−4.40
Independent	Richard Archer (elected)	836	9.44	
Independent	Janet Lambert (elected)	685	7.74	−3.92
Independent	Richard Goss (elected)	641	7.24	−3.59
Independent	Andrew McCullagh (elected)	604	6.82	
Independent	Dick Adams (elected)	592	6.69	−11.89
Independent	Alison Andrews (elected)	563	6.36	
Independent	Matthew Brooks (elected)	549	6.20	+2.22
Independent	Paul Terrett (elected)	524	5.92	
Independent	Michael Polley	391	4.42	−3.01
Independent	Rochelle Galloway	377	4.26	
Independent	Joanne Clarke	370	4.18	+2.56
Independent	Leisa Gordon	272	3.07	+0.51
Independent	Ian Goninon	223	2.52	−0.83
Independent	Jess Froude	189	2.13	
Independent	Kim Peart	180	2.03	+0.82
Independent	Russell Redmond	176	1.99	
Independent	Lisa Green	156	1.76	
Independent	Adam Barnett	138	1.56	
Independent	Jennifer Bolton	132	1.49	+0.51
Independent	Jan Davis	125	1.41	−12.00
Independent	Simon Froude	125	1.41	
Total formal votes		8,855	95.98	−0.74
Informal votes		371	4.02	+0.74
Turnout		9,226	88.62	+26.84

== Sorell ==
2022 Tasmanian local elections: Sorell
Party	Candidate	Votes	%	±%
Independent	Kerry Vincent (elected)	2,456	24.01	
Independent	Charles Wooley (elected)	2,292	22.40	
Independent	Natham Reynolds (elected)	1,009	9.86	
Independent	Marisol Miro Quesada Le Roux (elected)	867	8.47	
Independent	Meg Brown (elected)	575	5.62	
Independent	Carmel Torenius (elected)	510	4.98	
Independent	Melinda Reed (elected)	474	4.63	
Independent	Janet Gatehouse (elected)	368	3.60	
Independent	Shannon Campbell (elected)	300	2.93	
Independent	Daniel Bryan	195	1.91	
Independent	Geoffrey Jackson	178	1.74	
Independent	Vlad Gala	177	1.73	
Independent	Chris Hannan	175	1.71	
Independent	Scott Rawson	146	1.43	
Independent	Beth Nichols	124	1.21	
Independent	Ben Shaw	118	1.15	
Independent	Marc Michalsky	106	1.04	
Independent	Ryan McPherson	94	0.92	
Independent	Karl Spouse	67	0.65	
Total formal votes		10,231	96.74	
Informal votes		345	3.26	
Turnout		10,576	83.51	

== Southern Midlands ==
2022 Tasmanian local elections: Southern Midlands
Party	Candidate	Votes	%	±%
Independent	Karen Dudgeon (elected)	901	22.34	
Independent Labor	Edwin Batt (elected)	876	21.72	
Independent	Donna Blackwell (elected)	445	11.03	
Independent	Tony Bisdee (elected)	392	9.72	
Independent	Donald Frank Fish (elected)	365	9.05	
Independent	Rowena McDougall (elected)	354	8.78	
Independent	Bob Campbell	351	8.70	
Independent	Fraser Miller (elected)	349	8.65	
Total formal votes		4,033	97.13	
Informal votes		119	2.87	
Turnout		4,152	85.67	

== Tasman ==
2022 Tasmanian local elections: Tasman
Party	Candidate	Votes	%	±%
Independent	Rod Macdonald (elected)	573	26.19	
Independent	Kelly Spaulding (elected)	460	21.02	
Independent	Maria Stacey (elected)	313	14.31	
Greens	Angela Knott (elected)	220	10.05	
Independent	Hannah Fielder (elected)	170	7.77	
Independent	David Beard (elected)	163	7.45	
Independent	Daniel Kelleher (elected)	121	5.53	
Independent	Alan John Hull	103	4.71	
Independent	Jim Sharman	65	2.97	
Total formal votes		2188	97.85	
Informal votes		48	2.15	
Turnout		2,236	82.66	

== Waratah-Wynard ==
2022 Tasmanian local elections: Waratah-Wynyard
Party	Candidate	Votes	%	±%
Independent	Kevin Hyland (elected)	1,875	20.93	+13.73
Independent	Mary Duniam (elected)	1,815	20.26	+13.38
Independent	Dillon Roberts (elected)	1,078	12.04	
Independent	Celisa Edwards (elected)	1,055	11.78	+3.89
Independent	Michael Johnstone (elected)	717	8.00	
Independent	Gary Bramich (elected)	552	6.16	+2.74
Independent	Leanne Raw (elected)	435	4.86	
Independent	Andrea Courtney (elected)	322	3.59	−1.93
Independent	Kenneth Ewington	261	2.91	+0.36
Independent	Nina O'Leary	230	2.57	
Independent	Ryan Wilson	229	2.56	
Independent	Maureen Bradley	203	2.27	−0.54
Independent	Ruth Gordon	135	1.51	
Independent	Warwick Lloyd Mauger	50	0.56	
Total formal votes		8,957	96.67	−1.26
Informal votes		309	3.33	+1.26
Turnout		9,266	86.78	+25.76

== West Coast ==
2022 Tasmanian local elections: West Coast
Party	Candidate	Votes	%	±%
Independent	Shane Pitt (elected)	527	22.29	+10.79
Independent	Lindsay Newman (elected)	325	13.75	−4.58
Independent	Robert Butterfield (elected)	286	12.10	
Independent	Vikki Iwanicki (elected)	249	10.53	
Independent	Annie McKay (elected)	224	9.48	
Independent	Dwayne K A Jordan (elected)	152	6.43	
Independent	Liz Hamer (elected)	132	5.58	
Independent	Nick Maher	104	4.40	
Independent	Scott Stringer (elected)	102	4.31	−3.34
Independent	Terry Shea	75	3.17	−3.07
Independent	Kerry Graham (elected)	72	3.05	−0.10
Greens	Matthew Ryan-Sykes	71	3.00	−1.83
Independent	Colin Wilson	45	1.90	
Total formal votes		2,364	96.33	−0.67
Informal votes		90	3.67	+0.67
Turnout		2,454	82.16	+17.42

== West Tamar ==
2022 Tasmanian local elections: West Tamar
Party	Candidate	Votes	%	±%
Independent	Christina Holmdahl (elected)	2,969	19.12	−12.15
Independent	Rick Shegog (elected)	2,088	13.44	+8.34
Independent	Jess Greene (elected)	1,465	9.43	+5.42
Independent	Joshua Manticas (elected)	1,064	6.85	
Independent	Geoff Lyons (elected)	1,015	6.54	−1.04
Independent	Peter Kearney	909	5.85	+1.12
Independent	Lynden Ferguson (elected)	818	5.27	−0.85
Independent	Julie Sladden (elected)	769	4.95	
Independent	Joy Allen (elected)	766	4.93	−1.56
Independent	Richard Ireland (elected)	733	4.72	−0.32
Independent	Jim Collier	571	3.68	−0.43
Independent	Jorden Gunton	520	3.35	+0.99
Independent	Tim Woinarski	435	2.80	−2.63
Independent	Caroline Larner	406	2.61	
Independent	Dane Edwards	339	2.18	+0.50
Independent	Victoria Wilkinson	260	1.67	−0.07
Independent	Sven Wiener	147	0.95	−0.57
Independent	Peter Stoops	122	0.79	
Independent	Mark Price	90	0.58	−0.28
Independent	Malcolm Carey	44	0.28	
Total formal votes		15,530	95.59	+0.12
Informal votes		716	4.41	−0.12
Turnout		16,246	87.18	+33.99
