= Results of the 2008 New South Wales local elections =

- 13 September 2008

This is a list of local government area results for the 2008 New South Wales local elections.

== Results by LGA ==
=== LGAs by region ===
- Results of the 2008 New South Wales local elections in Central West
- Results of the 2008 New South Wales local elections in Hunter
- Results of the 2008 New South Wales local elections in Illawarra
- Results of the 2008 New South Wales local elections in Inner Sydney
- Results of the 2008 New South Wales local elections in Mid North Coast
- Results of the 2008 New South Wales local elections in Murray and Far West
- Results of the 2008 New South Wales local elections in New England
- Results of the 2008 New South Wales local elections in Northern Rivers
- Results of the 2008 New South Wales local elections in Orana
- Results of the 2008 New South Wales local elections in Outer Sydney
- Results of the 2008 New South Wales local elections in Riverina
- Results of the 2008 New South Wales local elections in South Coast and Southern Inland

=== Individual LGAs ===
- Results of the 2008 City of Sydney election
- Results of the 2008 City of Newcastle election

== Statewide results ==
Party	Votes	%	Swing	Seats	Change
Independents					
Liberal					
Labor					
Greens					
Independent Liberal					
Independent National					
Wake Up Warringah					
Clover Moore Independent Team				5	
Independent Labor					
Unity					
Christian Democrats				1	
Residents First Woollahra				5	
Australia First				0	
Community First Alliance					
Residents Action For Auburn					
No Parking Meters				1	▲1
Democratic Labor					
Albury Citizens and Ratepayers					
Parramatta Better Local Government					
Total		100.0	–	–	–
