= Results of the 2016 Victorian local elections =

This is a list of local government area results for the 2016 Victorian local elections.

== Ballarat ==
2016 Victorian local elections: Ballarat
Party	Votes	%	Seats	Change
Independent	27,257	46.39	2	▲1
Independent Liberal	16,043	27.31	4	▲1
Labor	7,925	13.49	2	Steady
Greens	7,527	12.81	1	Steady
Formal votes	58,752	100.0		

=== Central ===
2016 Victorian local elections: Central Ward
Party	Candidate	Votes	%	±%
Independent	Mark Harris	6,077	30.14	+15.88
Greens	Belinda Coates	4,301	21.33	+2.17
Independent Liberal	Samantha McIntosh	4,092	20.30	−5.8
Independent	William Bennett	2,086	10.35	
Labor	Ron Egeberg	1,711	8.49	
Independent	Gary Fitzgerald	960	4.76	+1.63
Independent	Glen Crompton	934	4.63	−3.38
Turnout		20,806	74.22	
Independent gain from Independent Liberal		Swing	+15.88	
Independent Liberal hold		Swing	−5.8	
Greens hold		Swing	+2.17	

=== North ===
2016 Victorian local elections: North Ward
Party	Candidate	Votes	%	±%
Independent Liberal	Amy Johnson	5,520	27.52	+7.22
Independent Liberal	Grant Tillet	2,929	14.60	
Independent	Vicki Coltman	2,214	11.04	−14.75
Independent	John Philips	2,156	10.75	−10.27
Labor	Daniel Moloney	2,089	10.42	−4.65
Greens	Angus McAlpine	2,005	10.00	
Independent	Rob Edward Smith	1,593	7.94	
Independent	Pauline Fay	902	4.50	
Independent	Jeni Eastwood	649	3.24	
Turnout		20,869	77.7	
Independent Liberal gain from Independent		Swing	+14.60	
Independent Liberal hold		Swing	+7.22	
Labor hold		Swing	−4.65	

=== South ===
2016 Victorian local elections: South Ward
Party	Candidate	Votes	%	±%
Labor	Des Hudson	4,125	22.26	−4.36
Independent Liberal	Ben Taylor	3,502	18.90	−0.23
Independent	Jim Rinaldi	2,785	15.03	−0.46
Independent	Peter Innes	1,768	9.54	−6.72
Greens	Tony Goodfellow	1,221	6.59	
Independent	Dave Armstrong	1,149	6.20	
Independent	Dianne Colbert	1,006	5.43	
Independent	Merle Hathaway	889	4.80	
Independent	Nick Shady	845	4.56	
Independent	Tim Powell	653	3.52	
Independent	Brian Pola	396	2.14	
Independent	Koby Lance Bunney	195	1.05	
Turnout		19,421	75.58	
Labor hold		Swing	−4.36	
Independent Liberal hold		Swing	−0.23	
Independent hold		Swing	−0.46	

== Moreland ==
2016 Victorian local elections: Moreland
Party	Votes	%	Seats	Change
Independent	25,164	36.49	4	▲2
Greens	20,582	29.84	4	▲3
Labor	19,728	28.60	2	▼1
Socialist Alliance	3,249	4.71	1	Steady
Formal votes	39,365	100.0		

=== North-East ===
2016 Victorian local elections: North-East Ward
Party	Candidate	Votes	%	±%
Greens	Natalie Abboud	5,640	22.62	
Socialist Alliance	Sue Bolton	3,249	13.03	
Labor	Annaliva Carli Hannan	2,805	11.25	
Independent	Ali Irfanli	2,154	8.64	
Labor	Anthony Helou	1,406	5.64	
Labor	Danny Michell	1,373	5.51	
Independent	Helen Pavlidis	1,120	4.49	
Labor	Katerina Angelopoulos	975	3.91	
Labor	Afshan Mian	956	3.83	
Independent	Francesco Timpano	840	3.37	
Independent	George Georgiou	822	3.30	
Independent	Paul Failla	713	2.86	
Labor	David Nunns	603	2.42	
Independent	Imogen Jubb	550	2.21	
Independent	Kevin Hong	494	1.98	
Independent	Antonio Bonifazio	370	1.48	
Greens	Adam Pulford	300	1.20	
Greens	Alex McGilvray	300	1.20	
Independent	Darcey Kelleher	206	0.83	
Independent	Gordon Gartside	58	0.23	
Turnout		29,466	65.09	

=== North-West ===
2016 Victorian local elections: North-West Ward
Party	Candidate	Votes	%	±%
Independent	Oscar Yildiz	7,331	28.44	
Greens	Dale Martin	4,044	15.69	
Independent	John Kavanagh	3,554	13.79	
Independent	Helen Davidson	2,798	10.86	
Labor	Alice Judith Pryor	1,617	6.27	
Labor	Mark O'Brien	1,117	4.33	
Labor	Milad El-Halabi	975	3.78	
Independent	Shaun Minehan	876	3.40	
Labor	Parsu Sharma Luital	874	3.39	
Independent	Raju Shakya	772	3.30	
Independent	Tonty Astuto	706	2.74	
Independent	Mohamad Elmustapha	496	1.92	
Greens	Sian Nelson	386	1.50	
Independent	Alesio Mulipola	227	0.88	
Turnout		29,338	64.90	

=== South ===
2016 Victorian local elections: South Ward
Party	Candidate	Votes	%	±%
Greens	Samantha Ratnam	9,259	50.71	
Labor	Lambros Tapinos	2,599	14.23	
Labor	Meghan Hopper	2,175	11.91	
Labor	Chris Hansen	987	5.41	
Labor	Joe Caputo	808	4.42	
Labor	Ray Pastoor	458	2.51	
Independent	Melissa Yuan	442	2.42	
Greens	Mark Riley	378	2.07	
Independent	Kelly Maree Smith	328	1.80	
Greens	Jess Dorney	275	1.51	
Independent	Dave O'Brien	199	1.09	
Independent	Vijay Bhusal	108	0.59	
Turnout		19,948	55.47	

== Melbourne ==
=== Leadership Team ===
2016 Victorian local elections: Melbourne (Leadership Team)
Party	Candidate	Votes	%	±%
Team Doyle	Robert Doyle; Arron Wood	31,743	44.62	+3.86
Greens	Olivia Ball; Roxane Ingleton	15,131	21.27	+6.48
Phil Cleary Means Business	Phil Cleary; Junxi Su	7,745	10.89	+10.89
Together Melbourne	Ken Ong; Sue Morphet	7,391	10.39	+10.39
Team Morgan - A City That Works	Gary Morgan; Michael O'Brien	4,830	6.79	−4.53
Strengthening Melbourne	Ron Hunt; Doone Clifton	2,548	3.58	+3.58
The Light On The Hill Team	Anthony van der Craats; Yunli Han	1,749	2.46	+2.46
Total formal votes		71,137	96.40	+0.75
Informal votes		2,658	3.60	−0.75
Turnout		73,795	55.15	−4.79
After distribution of preferences
Team Doyle	Robert Doyle; Arron Wood	36,974	51.98	−0.44
Greens	Olivia Ball; Roxane Ingleton	18,481	25.98	+0.91
Phil Cleary Means Business	Phil Cleary; Junxi Su	15,682	22.04	+22.04
Team Doyle hold		Swing	N/A	

=== Councillors ===
2016 Victorian local elections: Melbourne (Councillors)
Party	Candidate	Votes	%	±%
Quota		7,240		
Team Doyle	1. Kevin Louey (elected 1); 2. Nicholas Reece (elected 3); 3. Tessa Sullivan (elected 5); 4. Susan Riley (elected 9); 5. Beverley Pinder-Mortimer; 6. Sue Stanley; 7. Hope Wei	27,116	37.45	−0.03
Greens	1. Rohan Leppert (elected 2); 2. Cathy Oke (elected 4); 3. Apsara Sabaratnam; 4. Jenny Pitts; 5. Ben Curnow	14,593	20.16	+4.54
Together Melbourne	1. Philip Le Liu (elected 6); 2. Tony Penna; 3. Barbara Yerondais; 4. Alice Poon	6,578	9.09	+9.09
Phil Cleary Means Business	1. Michael Caiafa; 2. Suzanne Vale; 3. Sebastian Saggio	5,667	7.83	+7.83
Stephen Mayne T.I.A.E.	1. Stephen Mayne; 2. Johanna Maxwell	3,666	5.06	−0.95
Team Morgan - A City That Works	1. Jackie Watts (elected 7); 2. Michael Kennedy; 3. Farida Fleming	3,557	4.91	−4.69
Strengthening Melbourne	1. Robin Matthews; 2. Wesa Chau; 3. Roger Smith	1,905	2.63	+2.63
Animal Justice	1. Bruce Poon; 2. Fiona Creedy	1,770	2.44	+2.44
Listening To Locals	1. Richard Foster; 2. Bridie Walsh	1,718	2.37	+2.37
An Indigenous Voice On Council	~~1. Brooke Wandin~~; 2. Nicolas Frances Gilley (elected 8)	1,534	2.12	+2.12
Serving Melbourne With Integrity	1. Marcus Fielding; 2. Sallyann Wilson	1,519	2.10	+2.10
The Light On The Hill Team	1. Jim Ward; 2. Sergey Sizenko	960	1.33	+1.33
The Heritage Agenda	1. Adam Munro Ford; 2. Luke Downing	816	1.13	+1.13
Melburnian Voice	1. Joseph Sarraf; 2. Miroslav Zverina	808	1.12	+1.12
Science	Luke James	82	0.11	
Independent	Neil Pringle	57	0.11	
Independent	Jing Li	62	0.07	
Total formal votes		72,398	98.04	+0.2
Informal votes		1,451	1.96	−0.2
Turnout		73,849	55.19	−4.82
