= 2020 Melbourne City Council election =

2020 Australian local government election

- 24 October 2020
- Leadership team
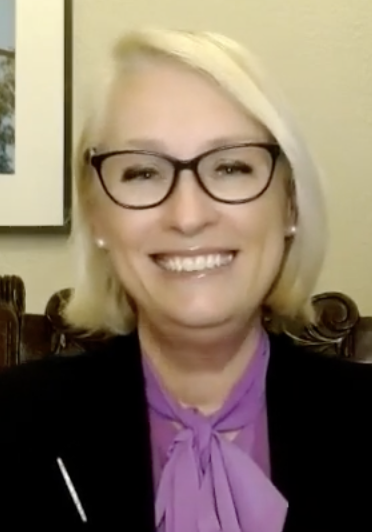

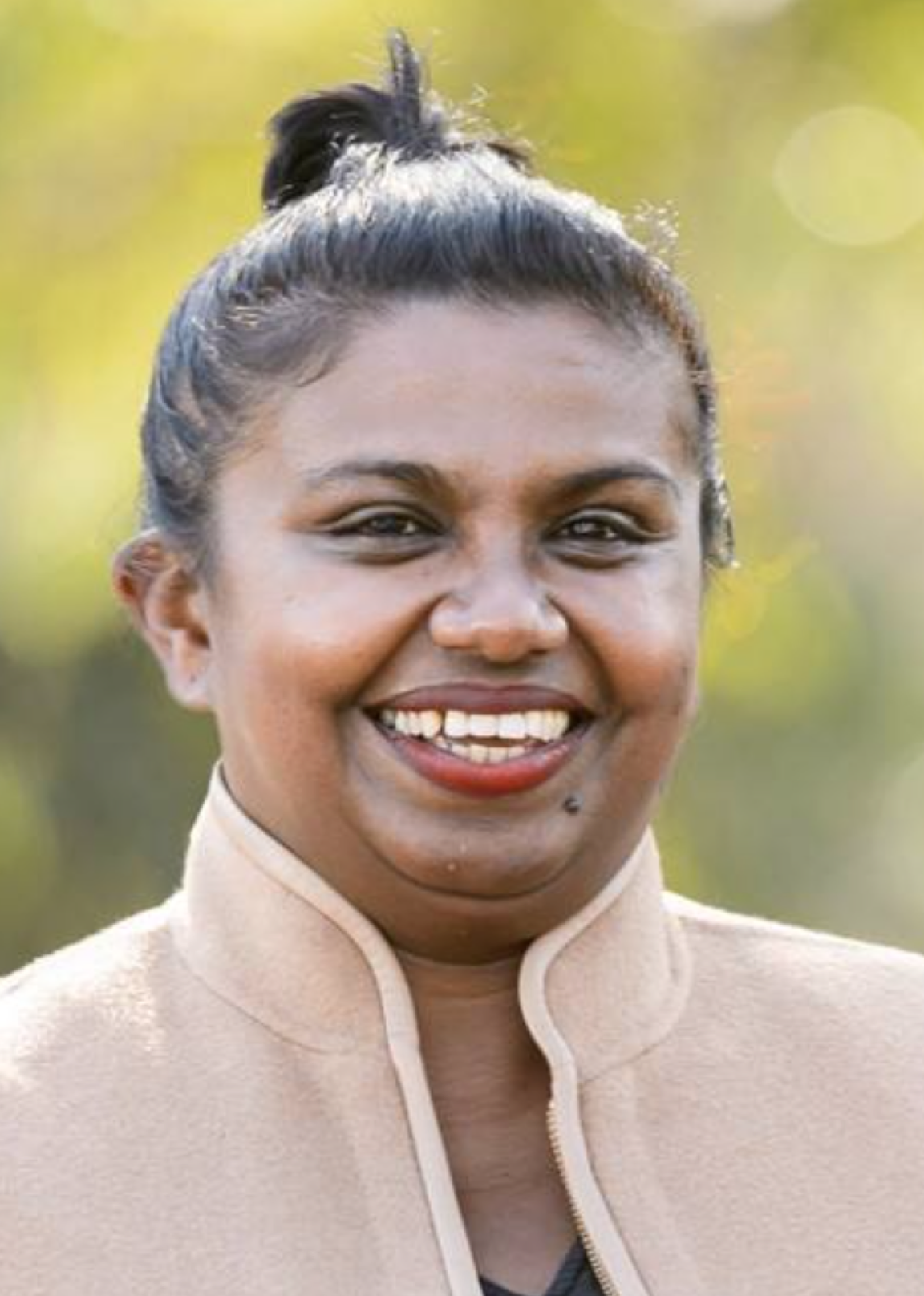

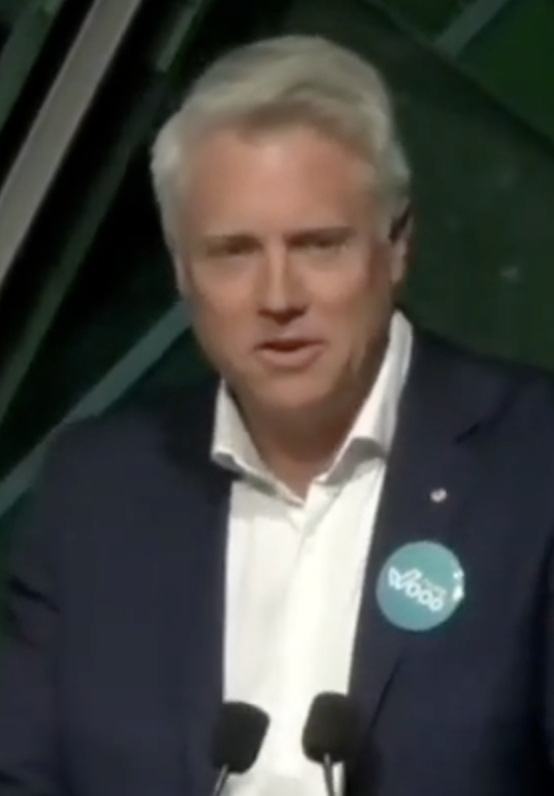
| Candidate | Sally Capp | Apsara Sabaratnam | Arron Wood |
| Party | Team Sally Capp | Greens | Team Wood |
| Running mate | Nicholas Reece | Roxane Ingleton | Lisa Teh |
| Primary vote | 27,949 | 14,753 | 13,497 |
| Percentage | 31.60% | 16.68% | 15.26% |
| 2CP | 53.44% | | 46.56% |
Lord Mayor before election
Sally Capp
Team Sally Capp
Elected Lord Mayor
Sally Capp
Team Sally Capp
- Councillors
- All 9 seats in the Melbourne City Council; 5 seats needed for a majority
| Party | Leader | Vote % | Seats | +/– |
|---|---|---|---|---|
| Independents | — | 60.57 | 6 | −1 |
| Greens | Rohan Leppert | 16.00 | 2 | 0 |
| Labor | Davydd Griffiths | 11.64 | 1 | +1 |
This lists parties that won seats. See the complete results below.

The 2020 Melbourne City Council election was held in October 2020 to elect nine councillors and a leadership team (consisting of a lord mayor and deputy lord mayor) to the City of Melbourne. The election was held as part of the statewide local government elections in Victoria, Australia.

Incumbent lord mayor Sally Capp, who was first elected at a 2018 by-election, won a second term, defeating incumbent deputy lord mayor Arron Wood.

== Key dates ==
Key dates in relation to the election are:

- Thursday, 28 August 2020 – Close of electoral rolls (4pm)
- Tuesday, 22 September 2020 – Close of nominations (12 noon)
- Tuesday, 6 October 2020 – Mail out of postal ballots commences
- Friday, 23 October 2020 – Close of voting (6pm)
- Friday, 30 October 2020 – Last day for receipt of postal votes (12 noon)
- Friday, 13 November 2020 – Declaration of result

== Electoral system ==
At the 2020 election, the Melbourne City Council electoral roll was composed of 55.1% business and out-of-the-area property owners, with local residents making up the remaining 44.9%.

== Candidates ==
A total of 77 candidates nominated for the election, an increase of 19 from 2016.

18 candidates ran for the Leadership Team positions of Lord Mayor and Deputy Lord Mayor running on 9 tickets, up from 14 candidates on 7 tickets in 2016.

59 candidates nominated for councillor positions, up from 44 in 2016.

=== Leadership Team ===
Incumbent Lord Mayor and Deputy Lord Mayor are shown in bold text. Successful candidates are highlighted in the relevant colour.

| Socialists | Bring Back Melbourne | Team Zorin | Labor | Greens |
|---|---|---|---|---|
| Kath Larkin; Daniel Nair Dadich | Nick Russian; Michael Burge | Wayne Tseng; Gricol Yang | Phil Reed; Wesa Chau | Apsara Sabaratnam; Roxane Ingleton |
| Team Arron Wood | Team Sally Capp | Back To Business | Morgan-Watts Team | |
| **Arron Wood**; Lisa Teh | **Sally Capp**; Nicholas Reece | Jennifer Yang; Sandra Gee | Gary Morgan; Mary-Lou Howie | |

=== Councillors ===
Incumbent councillors are shown in bold text. Tickets that elected at least one councillor are highlighted in the relevant colour. Successful candidates are identified by an asterisk (*).

| Labor | Bring Back Melbourne | Team Arron Wood | Your Melbourne Team Get It Done | Sustainable Australia | Team Hakim |
|---|---|---|---|---|---|
| 1. Davydd Griffiths*; 2. Mary Delahunty; 3. Hamdi Ali | 1. Elizabeth Mary Doidge*; 2. Charles Pick; 3. Moti Visa; 4. Bedri Sainovski | 1. Jason Chang*; 2. Peter Clarke; 3. **Beverley Frances Pinder**; 4. Abdirahman I. Ali; 5. Beverley Honig | 1. Mary Poulakis; 2. Fiona Sweetman | 1. Richard Belcher; 2. Bettina Terry | 1. Jamal Hakim*; 2. Safaa Hakim |
| Team Sally Capp | Animal Justice | Artemis Pattichi - Independent Local Voice | Liberal Democrats | Residents First | Melbourne - We All Matter |
| 1. **Kevin Louey***; 2. Roshena Campbell*; 3. Mark David McMillan; 4. Tania Davidge; 5. James Young; 6. Tina Kuek | 1. Rabin Bangaar; 2. Rod Whitfield | 1. Artemis Pattichi; 2. Adriana Mendieta Nino | 1. Paul Silverberg; 2. Faith Newman | 1. Janette Corcoran; 2. Mary Masters; 3. Samantha Tran | 1. Sainab Sheikh; 2. Fatuma Ali |
| Innovate Melbourne - Startup The City | Morgan-Watts Team | Bring Back Melbourne | Greens | Socialists | It Will Be Okay Melbourne |
| 1. Andrew Rowse; 2. John Daniell | 1. **Jackie Watts**; 2. Michael Kennedy; 3. Haya Aldaghlas; 4. Dashi Zhang | 1. **Philip Le Liu***; 2. Serena Lu Jiang; 3. Lauren Sherson; 4. Darin Schade | 1. **Rohan Leppert***; 2. Olivia Ball*; 3. Emily Corcoran; 4. David Jeffery; 5. Nakita Thomson; 6. Charlotte George | 1. Christopher di Pasquale; 2. Jesse Lambourn | 1. Joseph Burke; 2. Michael Mach |
Ungrouped
Scott Robson (Ind); Luke Downing (Ind); Philip Jonathan Bateman (Ind); Andrew Ward (Ind)

== Results ==
=== Leadership Team ===
2020 Victorian local elections: Melbourne (Leadership Team)
| Party | Candidate | Votes | % | ±% |
|---|---|---|---|---|
| Team Sally Capp | Sally Capp; Nicholas Reece | 27,949 | 31.60 | +6.22 |
| Greens | Apsara Sabaratnam; Roxane Ingleton | 14,753 | 16.68 | −4.59 |
| Team Arron Wood | Arron Wood; Lisa Teh | 13,497 | 15.26 | +15.26 |
| Bring Back Melbourne | Nick Russian; Michael Burge | 8,975 | 10.15 | +10.15 |
| Labor | Phil Reed; Wesa Chau | 8,355 | 9.45 | +9.45 |
| Back To Business | Jennifer Yang; Sandra Gee | 8,219 | 9.29 | +9.29 |
| Victorian Socialists | Kath Larkin; Daniel Nair Dadich | 2,911 | 3.29 | +3.29 |
| Morgan-Watts Team | Gary Morgan; Mary-Lou Howie | 2,446 | 2.77 | −4.02 |
| Team Zorin | Wayne Tseng; Gricol Yang | 1,329 | 1.50 | +1.50 |
| Total formal votes | | 88,434 | 96.62 | +0.22 |
| Informal votes | | 3,096 | 3.38 | −0.22 |
Two-candidate-preferred result
| Team Sally Capp | Sally Capp; Nicholas Reece | 47,256 | 53.44 | +0.39 |
| Team Arron Wood | Arron Wood; Lisa Teh | 41,178 | 46.56 | +46.56 |
| Team Sally Capp hold | | Swing | N/A | |

=== Councillor election ===
2020 Victorian local elections: Melbourne (councillors)
| Party | Candidate | Votes | % | ±% |
|---|---|---|---|---|
| Team Sally Capp | 1. Kevin Louey (elected 1); 2. Roshena Campbell (elected 5); 3. Mark David McMillan; 4. Tania Davidge; 5. James Young; 6. Tina Kuek | 24,395 | 26.73 | +26.73 |
| Greens | 1. Rohan Leppert (elected 2); 2. Olivia Ball (elected 6); 3. Emily Corcoran; 4. David Jeffery; 5. Nakita Thomson; 6. Charlotte George | 14,602 | 16.00 | −4.16 |
| Team Arron Wood | 1. Jason Chang (elected 3); 2. Peter Clarke; 3. Beverley Frances Pinder; 4. Abdirahman I. Ali; 5. Beverley Honig | 12,187 | 13.35 | +13.35 |
| Labor | 1. Davydd Griffiths (elected 4); 2. Mary Delahunty; 3. Hamdi Ali | 10,626 | 11.64 | +11.64 |
| Bring Back Melbourne | 1. Philip Le Liu (elected 7); 2. Serena Lu Jiang; 3. Lauren Sherson; 4. Darin Schade | 6,683 | 7.32 | −1.77 |
| Back To Business | 1. Elizabeth Mary Doidge (elected 9); 2. Charles Pick; 3. Moti Visa; 4. Bedri Sainovski | 6,572 | 7.18 | +7.18 |
| Liberal Democrats | 1. Paul Silverberg; 2. Faith Newman | 5,064 | 5.55 | +5.55 |
| Morgan-Watts Team | 1. Jackie Watts; 2. Michael Kennedy; 3. Haya Aldaghlas; 4. Dashi Zhang | 1,541 | 1.69 | −3.22 |
| Victorian Socialists | 1. Christopher di Pasquale; 2. Jesse Lambourn | 1,441 | 1.58 | +1.58 |
| Sustainable Australia | 1. Richard Belcher; 2. Bettina Terry | 1,361 | 1.49 | +1.49 |
| Animal Justice | 1. Rabin Bangaar; 2. Rod Whitfield | 1,251 | 1.37 | −1.07 |
| Residents First | 1. Janette Corcoran; 2. Mary Masters; 3. Samantha Tran | 1,110 | 1.21 | +1.21 |
| Innovate Melbourne | 1. Andrew Rowse; 2. John Daniell | 817 | 0.89 | +0.89 |
| Team Hakim | 1. Jamal Hakim (elected 8); 2. Safaa Hakim | 379 | 0.41 | +0.41 |
| Melbourne - We All Matter | 1. Sainab Sheikh; 2. Fatuma Ali | 374 | 0.41 | +0.41 |
| Artemis Pattichi - Independent Local Voice | 1. Artemis Pattichi; 2. Adriana Mendieta Nino | 351 | 0.38 | +0.38 |
| Ungrouped | Scott Robson; Luke Downing; Philip Jonathan Bateman; Andrew Ward | 332 | 0.36 | +0.10 |
| Your Melbourne Team Get It Done | 1. Mary Poulakis; 2. Fiona Sweetman | 291 | 0.32 | +0.32 |
| It Will Be Okay Melbourne | 1. Joseph Burke; 2. Michael Mach | 203 | 0.22 | +0.22 |
| Total formal votes | | 88,434 | 96.62 | −1.42 |
| Informal votes | | 1,686 | 3.38 | +1.42 |
| Turnout | | 91,531 | 66.73 | +11.54 |
