= 2004 Sydney City Council election =

Sydney City Council election

- 27 March 2004
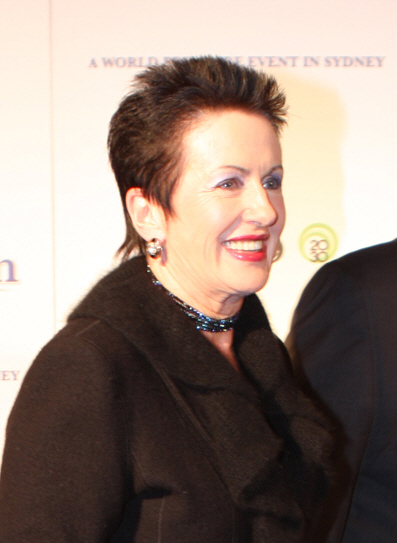

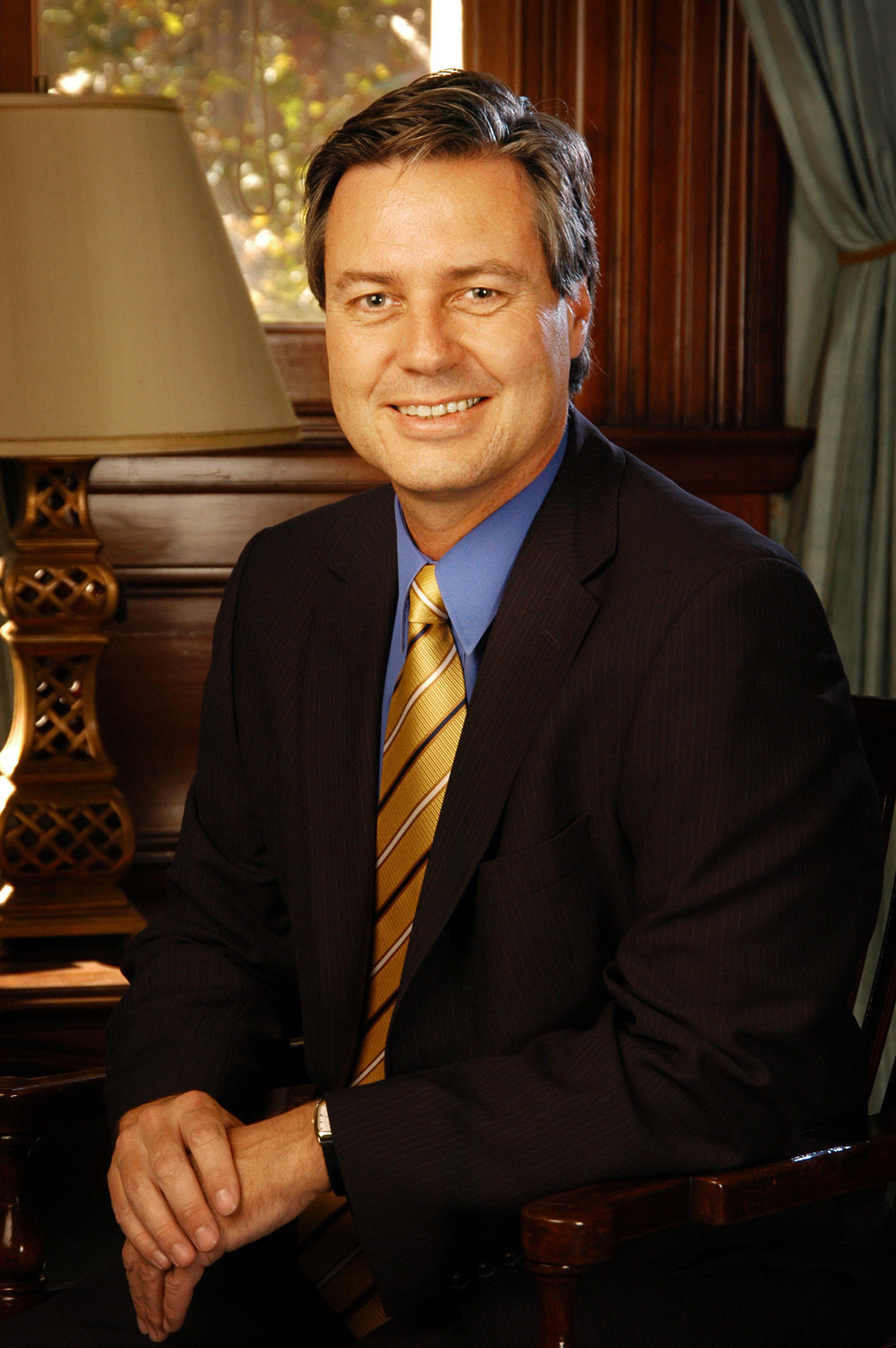

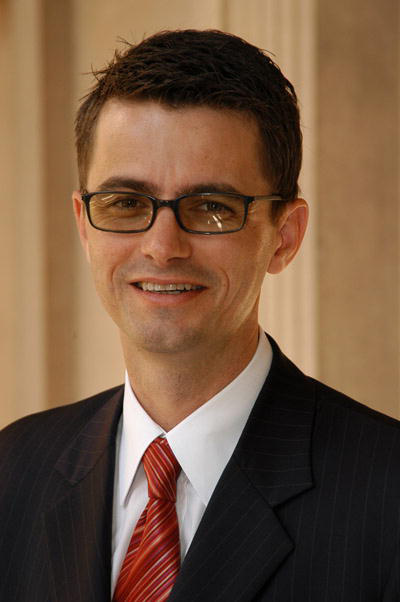

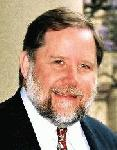

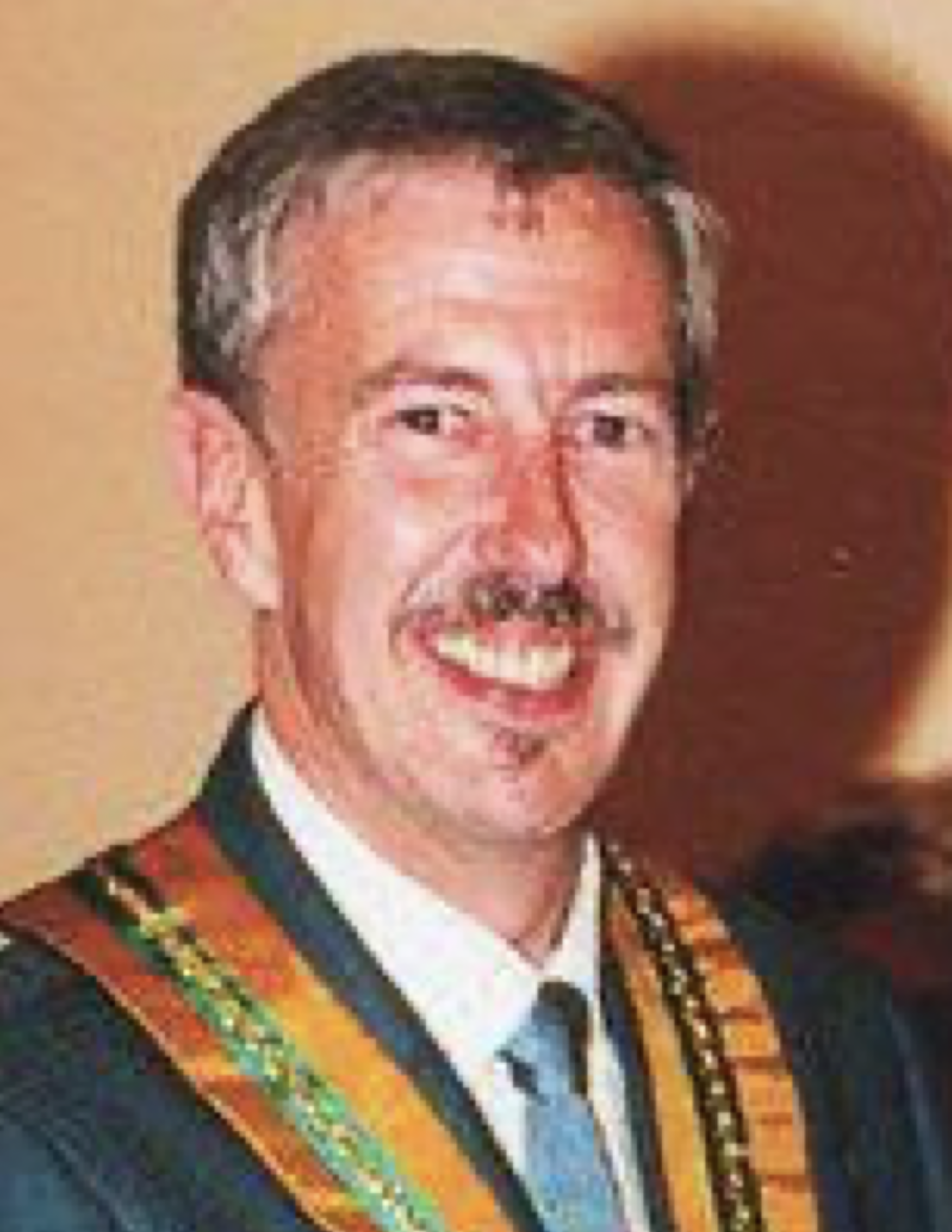
| | First party | Second party | Third party |
|---|---|---|---|
| Candidate | Clover Moore | Michael Lee | Shayne Mallard |
| Party | Team Clover | Labor | Liberal |
| | Fourth party | Fifth party | Sixth party |
| | | | IND |
| Candidate | Chris Harris | John Fowler | Peter Collins |
| Party | Greens | Sydney Inds | Ind. Liberal |
Lord Mayor before election
Lucy Turnbull
Living Sydney
Subsequent Lord Mayor
Clover Moore
Team Clover
- Councillors
- All 10 seats on the City Council (including the lord mayor); 5 seats needed for a majority
| Party | Leader | Vote % | Seats | +/– |
|---|---|---|---|---|
| Team Moore | Clover Moore | | 5 | +5 |
| Labor | Michael Lee | | 3 | |
| Liberal | Shayne Mallard | | 1 | +1 |
| Greens | Chris Harris | | 1 | +1 |
This lists parties that won seats. See the complete results below.

The 2004 Sydney City Council election was held on 27 March 2004 to elect nine councillors and a lord mayor to the City of Sydney. The election was held as part of the statewide local government elections in New South Wales, Australia.

The election followed the amalgamation of Sydney with the neighbouring City of South Sydney. Independent MP Clover Moore was elected lord mayor, becoming the first popularly elected female Lord Mayor of Sydney.

== Background ==
In 2002, parts of the City of South Sydney and Leichhardt were proposed to be merged with the City of Sydney. In 2003, Potts Point, Elizabeth Bay, Kings Cross, Darlinghurst, Chippendale, Ultimo and parts of Rushcutters Bay, Camperdown and Darlington were transferred from South Sydney to the City of Sydney. As the financial viability of the residual City of South Sydney was under threat as a result, the City of Sydney and the City of South Sydney were combined by proclamation on 6 February 2004. The 2003 merger was perceived as an attempt to bring more working class Labor Party voters into the City of Sydney.

== Candidates ==
A total of 67 candidates stood for election, including 14 lord mayoral candidates.

Lord mayoral candidates are listed in the order they appeared on the ballot:

| Party | Candidate | Background |
|---|---|---|
| Liberal | Shayne Mallard | Former South Sydney councillor |
| Democrats | Spencer Wu | Former Ashfield councillor who ran in the 1999 state election as leader of the Voice of the People Party |
| Independent | Dixie Coulton | Sydney councillor |
| Independent Liberal | Peter Collins | Former Leader of the Opposition of New South Wales |
| Socialist Alliance | Susan Price | Unionist |
| Independent | Phillip Daley | |
| Greens | Chris Harris | |
| Sydney Independents | John Fowler | Former South Sydney mayor |
| Independent | Tony Spanos | Ferrymaster |
| Labor | Michael Lee | Former federal MP |
| Independent | Beverly Baker | Former NSW Parents and Citizens Association president |
| Team Clover | Clover Moore | Independent MP for Bligh |
| Independent | Ormond McDermott | |
| Independent | Matt Laffan | Lawyer and disability advocate |

=== Team Clover ===
On 24 February 2004, independent MP Clover Moore announced she would run for lord mayor, labelling the council's sacking a "cynical grab for power." Despite her ideological differences with Turnbull, she also sharply denounced the sacking of a democratically elected mayor.

Moore formed the Clover Moore Independent team, which included six other candidates.

=== Labor ===
Former federal MP Michael Lee contested as Labor's lord mayoral candidate. He officially announced his candidacy on 3 March 2004.

=== Liberal ===
Former South Sydney councillor Shayne Mallard contested the election as the first-ever endorsed Liberal Party lord mayoral candidate.

=== Others ===
The Greens contested the lord mayoralty for the first time, with Chris Harris as their candidate. The Australian Democrats and Socialist Alliance both endorsed candidates.

Incumbent Sydney councillor Dixie Coulton, a former Living Sydney and Sydney Independents member, was one of six independent candidates.
