= Community First Alliance =

- Abbreviation: CFA; Community First
- President: Sonya Phillips
- Founder: Sonya Phillips
- Founded: 2004
- Dissolved: Late 2008
- Baulkham Hills Shire Council: 2 / 12 (2004−2008)
- Sutherland Shire Council: 2 / 15 (2008)
- Warringah Council: 1 / 10 (2008)

The Community First Alliance (CFA), also known simply as Community First (CF), was an Australian political party that contested local government elections in New South Wales.

== History ==
Community First was founded by Sonya Phillips ahead of the 2004 local government elections. At the elections, the party only contested Baulkham Hills Shire, where two of its candidates (including Phillips) were elected.

In 2008, the party expanded to contest Sutherland Shire and Warringah Council as well as Baulkham Hills, although Phillips did not seek re-election. During the campaign, Labor Party members in Kiama contested on an unregistered ticket also called "Community First". As a result, Phillips made a formal complaint to the New South Wales Electoral Commission.

At the elections, Community First won two seats in Sutherland and one seat in Warringah. However, it faded away following the elections.
