= 2016 Melbourne City Council election =

- 22 October 2016
- Registered: 133,801
- Turnout: 73,795 ▼4.79%
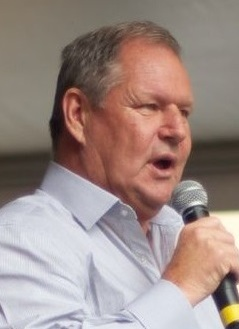

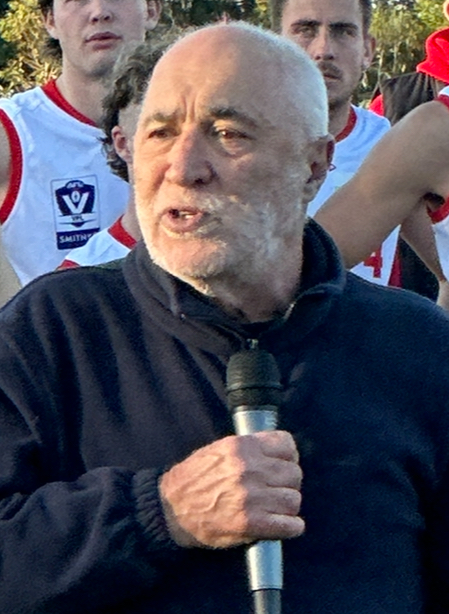
Candidate	Robert Doyle	Olivia Ball	Phil Cleary
Deputy candidate	Arron Wood	Roxane Ingleton	Junxi Su
Voting ticket	Independent	Greens	Independent
First round	31,743	15,131	7,745
First round (%)	44.62%	21.72%	10.89%
Final round	36,974	18,481	15,682
Final round (%)	51.98%	25.98%	22.04%
Lord Mayor of Melbourne before election
Robert Doyle
Independent
Elected Lord Mayor
Robert Doyle
Independent

Elections to the City of Melbourne were held via postal ballot in 2016 to elect 9 councillors to the council, as well as the direct election of the Lord Mayor and Deputy Lord Mayor of Melbourne. Independent Robert Doyle was re-elected as Lord Mayor for a third term.

Following the resignation of councillor-elect Brooke Wandin, a full recount of councillor ballots was ordered by the Victorian Civil and Administrative Tribunal on 14 March 2017.

== Results ==
=== Leadership Team ===
2016 Victorian local elections: Melbourne (Leadership Team)
Party	Candidate	Votes	%	±%
Team Doyle	Robert Doyle; Arron Wood	31,743	44.62	+3.86
Greens	Olivia Ball; Roxane Ingleton	15,131	21.27	+6.48
Phil Cleary Means Business	Phil Cleary; Junxi Su	7,745	10.89	+10.89
Together Melbourne	Ken Ong; Sue Morphet	7,391	10.39	+10.39
Team Morgan - A City That Works	Gary Morgan; Michael O'Brien	4,830	6.79	−4.53
Strengthening Melbourne	Ron Hunt; Doone Clifton	2,548	3.58	+3.58
The Light On The Hill Team	Anthony van der Craats; Yunli Han	1,749	2.46	+2.46
Total formal votes		71,137	96.40	+0.75
Informal votes		2,658	3.60	−0.75
Turnout		73,795	55.15	−4.79
Team Doyle	Robert Doyle; Arron Wood	36,974	51.98	−0.44
Greens	Olivia Ball; Roxane Ingleton	18,481	25.98	+0.91
Phil Cleary Means Business	Phil Cleary; Junxi Su	15,682	22.04	+22.04
Team Doyle hold		Swing	N/A	

=== Councillors ===
#	Councillor	Party
1	Kevin Louey	Independent
2	Rohan Leppert	Greens
3	Nicholas Reece	Independent
4	Cathy Oke	Greens
5	Tessa Sullivan	Independent
6	Philip Le Liu	Independent
7	Jackie Watts	Independent
8	Nicolas Frances Gilley	Independent
9	Susan Riley	Independent

2016 Victorian local elections: Melbourne (Councillors)
Party	Candidate	Votes	%	±%
Quota		7,240		
Team Doyle	1. Kevin Louey (elected 1); 2. Nicholas Reece (elected 3); 3. Tessa Sullivan (elected 5); 4. Susan Riley (elected 9); 5. Beverley Pinder-Mortimer; 6. Sue Stanley; 7. Hope Wei	27,116	37.45	−0.03
Greens	1. Rohan Leppert (elected 2); 2. Cathy Oke (elected 4); 3. Apsara Sabaratnam; 4. Jenny Pitts; 5. Ben Curnow	14,593	20.16	+4.54
Together Melbourne	1. Philip Le Liu (elected 6); 2. Tony Penna; 3. Barbara Yerondais; 4. Alice Poon	6,578	9.09	+9.09
Phil Cleary Means Business	1. Michael Caiafa; 2. Suzanne Vale; 3. Sebastian Saggio	5,667	7.83	+7.83
Stephen Mayne T.I.A.E.	1. Stephen Mayne; 2. Johanna Maxwell	3,666	5.06	−0.95
Team Morgan - A City That Works	1. Jackie Watts (elected 7); 2. Michael Kennedy; 3. Farida Fleming	3,557	4.91	−4.69
Strengthening Melbourne	1. Robin Matthews; 2. Wesa Chau; 3. Roger Smith	1,905	2.63	+2.63
Animal Justice	1. Bruce Poon; 2. Fiona Creedy	1,770	2.44	+2.44
Listening To Locals	1. Richard Foster; 2. Bridie Walsh	1,718	2.37	+2.37
An Indigenous Voice On Council	~~1. Brooke Wandin~~; 2. Nicolas Frances Gilley (elected 8)	1,534	2.12	+2.12
Serving Melbourne With Integrity	1. Marcus Fielding; 2. Sallyann Wilson	1,519	2.10	+2.10
The Light On The Hill Team	1. Jim Ward; 2. Sergey Sizenko	960	1.33	+1.33
The Heritage Agenda	1. Adam Munro Ford; 2. Luke Downing	816	1.13	+1.13
Melburnian Voice	1. Joseph Sarraf; 2. Miroslav Zverina	808	1.12	+1.12
Science	Luke James	82	0.11	
Independent	Neil Pringle	57	0.11	
Independent	Jing Li	62	0.07	
Total formal votes		72,398	98.04	+0.2
Informal votes		1,451	1.96	−0.2
Turnout		73,849	55.19	−4.82

== Aftermath ==
On 8 November, councillor-elect Brooke Wandin stood down from her position amid an investigation by the Local Government Investigations and Compliance Inspectorate into her eligibility. Wandin and former councillor Richard Foster were later charged with electoral fraud, with prosecutors alleging Wandin did not live at the Kensington address she had nominated when registering for election. Both parties plead guilty to charges of electoral fraud; Foster received a 12-month good behaviour bond, while Wandin was placed onto a diversion program.

As a result of Wandin standing down from the council, on 5 December 2016 the Municipal Electoral Tribunal ordered a countback of votes cast. The Victorian Electoral Commission appealed this decision to the Victorian Civil and Administrative Tribunal, seeking a full recount. On 14 March 2017, the Tribunal ruled in the Commission's favour. A full recount elected Nicolas Frances Gilley and Susan Riley as the eighth and ninth councilors respectively, displacing Michael Caiafa who would have been retained in a vote countback. Gilley and Riley were sworn into council on 21 March 2017.
