= 2022 Hobart City Council election =

Local election in Tasmania, Australia

- 3–25 October 2022

All 12 seats on Hobart City Council 7 seats needed for a majority
- Lord Mayor
- Turnout: 83.02%
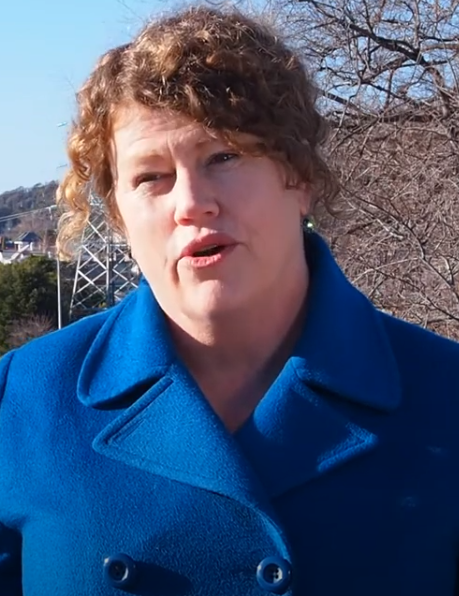
	First party	Second party	Third party
		IND	IND
Candidate	Anna Reynolds	John Kelly	Marti Zucco
Party	Your Hobart	Independent	Independent
Primary vote	9,015	6,190	3,676
Percentage	28.78%	19.76%	11.73%
TCP	53.41%	46.59%
Lord Mayor before election
Anna Reynolds
Your Hobart Independents
Elected Lord Mayor
Anna Reynolds
Your Hobart Independents
- Deputy Lord Mayor
- Turnout: 83.02%
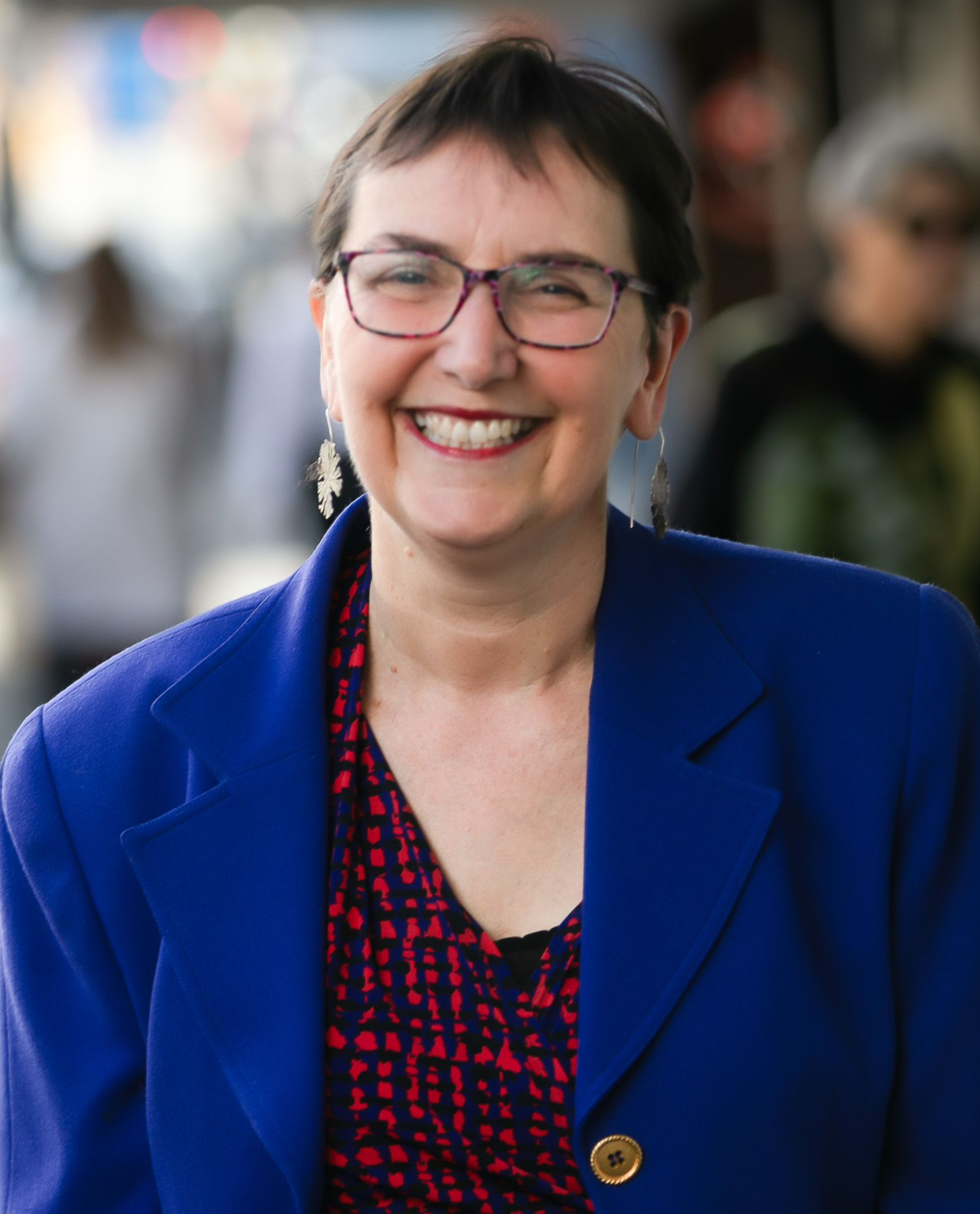
	First party	Second party	Third party
		IND	YHI
Candidate	Helen Burnet	Simon Behrakis	Mike Dutta
Party	Greens	Ind. Liberal	Your Hobart
Primary vote	8,203	5,261	4,557
Percentage	26.38%	16.92%	14.65%
TCP	61.13%	38.87%
Deputy Lord Mayor before election
Helen Burnet
Greens
Elected Deputy Lord Mayor
Helen Burnet
Greens
- Councillors
Party	Leader	Vote %	Seats	+/–
Independents	N/A	41.21	4	
Your Hobart	Anna Reynolds	26.37	3	
Ind. Liberal	N/A	12.72	2	
Greens	Bill Harvey	12.30	2	
Ind. Labor	N/A	3.31	1	
This lists parties that won seats. See the complete results below.
Results by ward

The 2022 Hobart City Council election was held in October 2022 to elect a lord mayor, deputy lord mayor and 12 councillors to the City of Hobart. The election was held as part of the statewide local elections in Tasmania, Australia.

Anna Reynolds was re-elected lord mayor with 53.41% of the vote after preferences, while Helen Burnet was re-elected deputy lord mayor.

An elector poll was also held with the question of 'Do you support the University of Tasmania’s proposal to relocate the Sandy Bay campus into Hobart’s central business district?' with 7,797 (25.62%) yes votes and 22,631 (74.38%) no votes.

Like all other local government areas in Tasmania, voting was compulsory for the first time.

== Candidates ==
Incumbent lord mayor Anna Reynolds announced in June 2022 that she would seek re-election.

Former Liberal Democrats senator Duncan Spender contested the deputy lord mayoral election.

== Results ==
=== Lord Mayor ===
2022 Tasmanian mayoral elections: Hobart
Party	Candidate	Votes	%	±%
Your Hobart Independents	Anna Reynolds	9,015	28.78	
Independent	John Kelly	6,190	19.76	
Independent	Marti Zucco	3,676	11.73	
Independent	Louise Elliot	3,593	11.47	
Greens	Bill Harvey	3,481	11.11	
Independent Liberal	Louise Bloomfield	3,025	9.65	
Our Hobart	Marcus Bai	1,176	3.75	
Independent Liberal	Will Coats	1,161	3.70	
Total formal votes		31,317	97.87	
Informal votes		684	2.13	
Turnout		32,001	83.02	
Two-candidate-preferred result
Your Hobart Independents	Anna Reynolds	14,571	53.41	
Independent	John Kelly	12,711	46.59	
Your Hobart Independents hold		Swing		

=== Deputy Lord Mayor ===
2022 Tasmanian deputy mayoral elections: Hobart
Party	Candidate	Votes	%	±%
Greens	Helen Burnet	8,203	26.38	
Independent Liberal	Simon Behrakis	5,261	16.92	
Your Hobart Independents	Mike Dutta	4,557	14.65	
Independent	Jeff Briscoe	4,538	14.59	
Independent Labor	Ryan Posselt	2,816	9.05	
Independent	Damon Thomas	2,315	7.44	
Our Hobart	Ron Christie	1,453	4.67	
Ind. Liberal Democrat	Duncan Spender	1,043	3.35	
Independent	Michael Jackson	470	1.51	
Our Hobart	Owen Davies	432	1.38	
Total formal votes		31,088	97.15	
Informal votes		914	2.85	
Turnout		32,002	83.02	
Two-candidate-preferred result
Greens	Helen Burnet	16,068	61.13	
Independent Liberal	Simon Behrakis	10,216	38.87	
Greens hold		Swing		

=== Councillors ===
2022 Tasmanian local elections: Hobart
Party	Candidate	Votes	%	±%
Your Hobart Independents	Anna Reynolds (elected)	4,266	13.89	
Independent	John Kelly (elected)	4,067	13.24	
Independent	Marti Zucco (elected)	2,150	7.00	
Independent	Louise Elliot (elected)	1,824	5.94	
Greens	Helen Burnet (elected)	1,529	4.98	
Independent Liberal	Louise Bloomfield (elected)	1,473	4.80	
Independent Liberal	Simon Behrakis (elected)	1,448	4.72	
Your Hobart Independents	Mike Dutta (elected)	1,230	4.01	
Greens	Bill Harvey (elected)	1,219	3.97	
Independent Labor	Ryan Posselt (elected)	1,016	3.31	
Independent	Ben Lohberger (elected)	936	3.05	
Independent	Jax Fox	838	2.73	
Your Hobart Independents	Zelinda Sherlock (elected)	656	2.14	
Your Hobart Independents	Kate Kelly	646	2.10	
Independent	Jeff Briscoe	605	1.97	
Our Hobart	Marcus Bai	572	1.86	
Your Hobart Independents	Brian Corr	500	1.63	
Independent Liberal	Will Coats	486	1.58	
Independent	Damon Thomas	459	1.49	
Greens	Gemma Kitsos	428	1.39	
Your Hobart Independents	Matt Etherington	373	1.21	
Independent	Steven Phipps	350	1.14	
Greens	Bec Taylor	321	1.05	
Greens	Nathan Volf	281	0.92	
Independent	Debra Thurley	270	0.88	
Independent	Edwin Johnstone	268	0.87	
Your Hobart Independents	Juniper Shaw	258	0.84	
Independent Liberal	James McKee	256	0.83	
Our Hobart	Ron Christie	241	0.78	
Independent	Yang Liu	225	0.73	
Independent	Sam Campbell	213	0.69	
Your Hobart Independents	Raj Chopra	169	0.55	
Ind. Liberal Democrat	Duncan Spender	157	0.51	
Independent	Tiina Sexton	137	0.45	
Our Hobart	Lili Christie	131	0.43	
Independent Liberal	Daniel Geng	127	0.41	
Independent Liberal	Stefan Vogel	115	0.37	
Independent	Jono Stagg	108	0.35	
Independent	Michael Jackson	99	0.32	
Our Hobart	Ling Ling Gao	76	0.25	
Independent	Joe Grech	72	0.23	
Our Hobart	Owen Davies	42	0.14	
Our Hobart	Karen Rothery	39	0.13	
Independent	Cadence Mitchell	32	0.10	
Total formal votes		30,708	96.70	
Informal votes		1,047	3.30	
Turnout		31,755	82.38	
Party total votes
Independent		12,653	41.21	
Your Hobart Independents		8,098	26.37	
Independent Liberal		3,905	12.72	
Greens		3,778	12.30	
Our Hobart		1,101	3.59	
Independent Labor		1,016	3.31	
Independent Liberal Democrat		157	0.51	
Party total seats			Seats	±
Independent			4	
Your Hobart Independents			3	
Greens			2	
Independent Liberal			2	
Independent Labor			1	
