= Results of the 2008 New South Wales local elections in Mid North Coast =

Results of the 2008 New South Wales local elections in the Mid North Coast
- 13 September 2008

These are the results of the 2008 New South Wales local elections in the Mid North Coast region.

== Coffs Harbour ==
2008 Coffs Harbour City Council election
- 13 September 2008

All 9 seats on Coffs Harbour City Council
- Mayor
	First party	Second party	Third party
	IND		IND
Candidate	Keith Rhoades	Mark Graham	John Arkan
Party	Independent	The Greens NSW	Independent
Primary vote	13,610	8,176	6,626
Percentage	36.7%	22.0%	17.9%
Elected Mayor
Keith Rhoades
Independent
- Councillors
- All 8 Councillors (out of 9 seats) on Coffs Harbour City Council
- Turnout: 80.6%
Party	Vote %	Seats	+/–
Independents	79.8	6	
Greens	18.4	2	
This lists parties that won seats. See the complete results below.

Keith Rhoades was once again elected mayor.

=== Coffs Harbour mayoral results ===
2008 New South Wales local elections: Coffs Harbour City Council
Party	Candidate	Votes	%	±%
Independents (Group D)	1. ~~Keith Rhoades~~ (elected mayor); 2. Kerry Hines (elected 1); 3. Denise Knight (elected 6); 4. Paul Templeton(elected 8)	8,390	27.1	
Greens NSW (Group E)	1. Mark Graham (elected 2); 2. Rodney Degens (elected 7); 3. Jaben Golledge; 4. Aina Ranke; 5. Joanne Renfrey	5,697	18.4	
Independents (Group C)	1. John Arkan (elected 3); 2. Annet Mavin; 3. Sue Hereford-Ashley; 4. Bob Lenehan	4,707	15.2	
Independents (Group F)	1. Jennifer Bonfield (elected 4); 2. Ian Ovens; 3. Fiona Barden; 4. George Cecato	4,218	13.6	
Unaligned (Group B)	1. Bill Palmer (elected 5); 2. Bill Fisher; 3. Jesse Young; 4. Stephen Millward	3,734	12.1	
Independents (Group C)	1. Tony Scholes; 2. David Quinn; 3. Bea Ballangarry; 4. Lena Lawrence; 5. Luisa Jackson	1,331	4.3	
Independents (Group H)	1. John Fitzroy; 2. Richard McLaughlin; 3. Judi Coward; 4. Mary Fitzroy; 5. Brian Davitt	975	3.2	
Independent	Deborah Lions	702	2.3	
Australia First (Group G)	1. Darrell Wallbridge; 2. Alex Parker; 3. Greg Bailey; 4. Richard Hedditch; 5. Kevin Baldwin	548	1.8	
Independent	John Hearne	170	0.5	
Total formal votes		30,928		
Informal votes		2,620		
Turnout		33,548		

=== Coffs Harbour mayoral results ===
2008 New South Wales local elections: Coffs Harbour Mayor
Party	Candidate	Votes	%	±%
Independent	Keith Rhoades	13,610	36.7	
Greens	Mark Graham	8,176	22.0	
Independent	John Arkan	6,626	17.9	
Unaligned	Bill Palmer	6,444	17.4	
Independent	John Fitzroy	2,255	6.1	
Total formal votes		37,111	95.6	
Informal votes		1,694	4.4	
Turnout		38,805	82.2	
Two-candidate-preferred result
Independent	Keith Rhoades	17,251	58.6	
Greens	Mark Graham	12,193	41.4	
Keith Rhoades hold		Swing		
