= 2011 Shellharbour and Wollongong local elections =

Elections in New South Wales, Australia

The 2011 Shellharbour and Wollongong local elections were held on 3 September 2011 to elect the councils of the City of Shellharbour and the City of Wollongong in New South Wales.

Wollongong City Council was sacked in March 2008 amid a corruption inquiry, and the same happened to Shellharbour City Council in July 2008 because of continual failures with the council's code of conduct committee. This meant electors in both councils did not vote at the 2008 local elections.

Both councils also faced a proposed merger, which was later abandoned.

Shellharbour has single ward with seven councillors, while Wollongong has a popularly-elected mayor, along with three wards that have four councillors each.

== Results ==
=== Wollongong ===
Council party totals
Party	Votes	%	Seats	Change
Liberal			4	
Labor			4	
Independent			2	
Greens			2	

== Aftermath ==
Under the Local Government (Shellharbour and Wollongong Elections) Act 2011, which passed the New South Wales Parliament on 9 May 2011, councillors were elected to hold office until the 2016 local elections, meaning they skipped the 2012 local elections. However, as a result of delays caused by amalgamation proposals, both councils went to the polls in 2017 instead.

In 2014, Shellharbour councillors began to investigate the costs of a referendum that would allow voters to directly elect their mayor (as was the case before 2008) and increase the number of councillors from seven to nine. Both proposals later passed at a 2017 referendum, with four wards created with two councillors each, plus the mayor.
