= Dan Gleeson (politician) =

Australian politician

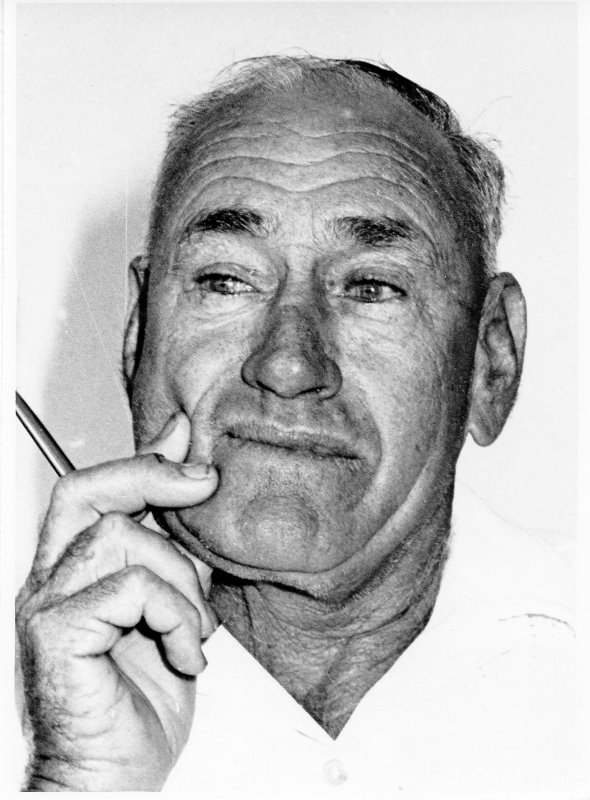
Dan Gleeson, OBE

Daniel Gleeson OBE (11 November 1914 - January 1994), a politician of North Queensland Australia, was the first Mayor of the Former City of Thuringowa.

== Personal ==
Mr Gleeson was the fourth child of three pioneering families who came to North Queensland in the late 1800s. He left school and started working for Northern Cars and Tractors before he turned 14. Northern Cars and Tractors did not survive the Great Depression and Mr Gleeson worked in wood-cutting, labouring, cane-cutting and cooking in the Johnstone Shire and in Townsville and Thuringowa. During World War II he was a member of the Civil Construction Corps was helped in the construction of runways in Cairns, Townsville and Thuringowa.

After the war, Gleeson became second-in-charge of the Main Roads Workshops until his retirement in 1955. Mr Gleeson then became a partner in Earthmoving Contractors which operated until 1983.

Dan Gleeson's wife was Daisy Gleeson, they had four children together. Dan died after a long illness in January, 1994.

== Political career ==
In 1970 Gleeson was approached to accept nomination for the Thuringowa Shire Council but he declined. He was again asked in 1973 and agreed to fill one of two positions on offer in Division Four. Within three years Gleeson became the Chairman of the Shire Council.

Gleeson was awarded the Order of the British Empire (OBE) in the 1984 Queen's Birthday Honours List for his "contribution to local government and his role in the field of water resource development in North Queensland". Under his administration the Thuringowa administration building was moved from City of Townsville City out to Thuringowa. Gleeson spearheaded a move which saw Thuringowa become a city on 1 January 1986 and was elected as the first Mayor of Thuringowa in 1986 and served until April 1991 when he was defeated by, Les Tyrell, who had been his deputy for two terms.

After his passing the "Dan Gleeson Memorial Gardens" were dedicated to the memory of Gleeson by his successor Mayor Les Tyrell.

The then Labor Member for Thuringowa Ken McElligott has since stated, that a deal was done before the 1986 state election whereby Minister for Local Government Russ Hinze would declare Thuringowa a city in return for Gleeson (then shire chairman) who was running as an independent delivering his preferences to the National Party's Peter Arnold. McElligott states that this deal was explained to him by Arnold after the election and that it has never been denied by the National Party. His chairmanship and mayoralty of Thuringowa has been described as colourful but well-connected (within the State Government), he has also been described as 'a political chameleon' for having been previously a member of the Labor Party.
