= 2008 New South Wales local elections =

- 13 September 2008

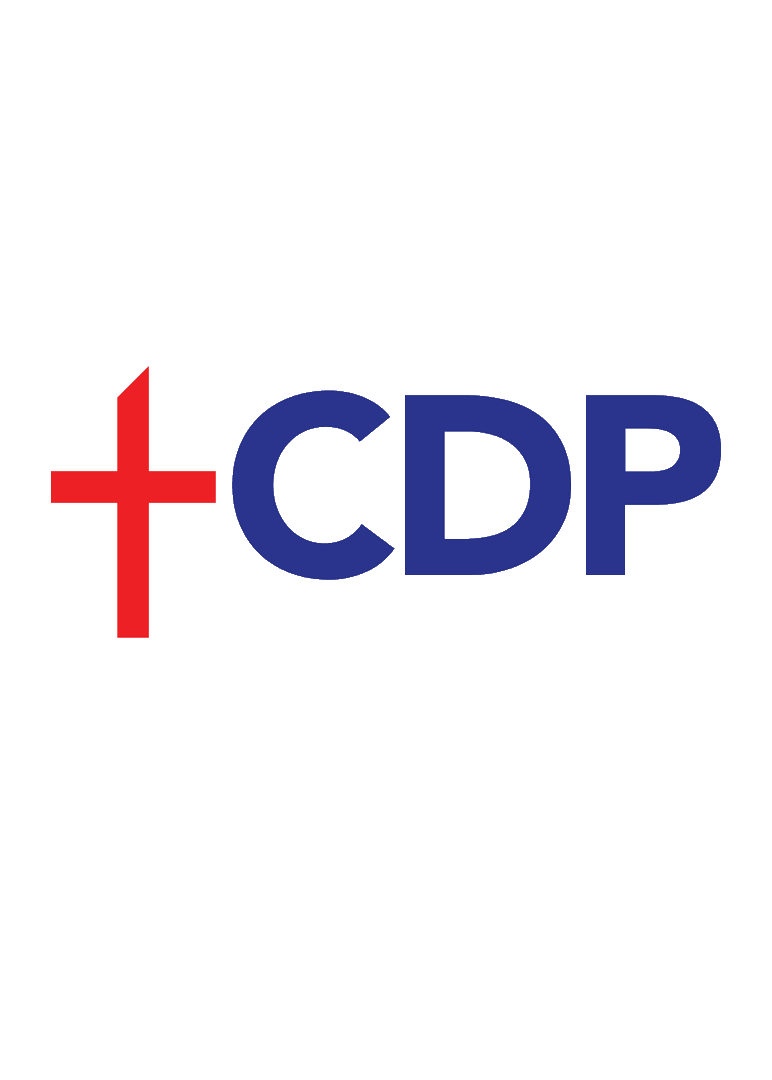
	First party	Second party	Third party
	IND
Leader	N/A	N/A	N/A
Party	Independents	Liberal	Labor
	Fourth party	Fifth party	Sixth party
		UNI
Leader	No leader	No leader	Fred Nile
Party	Greens	Unity	Christian Democrats
Seats before			0
Seats won			1
	Seventh party	Eighth party
	NPM	DLP
Leader	Charles Matthews	No leader
Party	No Parking Meters	Democratic Labor
Last election	Did not exist
Seats before	0
Seats won	1
Seat change	▲1

The 2008 New South Wales local elections were held on 13 September 2008 to elect the councils of 150 of the 152 local government areas (LGAs) of New South Wales. Several councils also held mayoral elections and/or referendums.

No elections were held in Shellharbour or Wollongong, as both councils had been sacked earlier in the year. The two councils would later hold elections in 2011.

== Results ==
Party	Votes	%	Swing	Seats	Change
Independents					
Liberal					
Labor					
Greens					
Independent Liberal					
Independent National					
Wake Up Warringah					
Clover Moore Independent Team				5	
Independent Labor					
Unity					
Christian Democrats				1	
Residents First Woollahra				5	
Australia First				0	
Community First Alliance					
Residents Action For Auburn					
No Parking Meters				1	▲1
Democratic Labor					
Albury Citizens and Ratepayers					
Parramatta Better Local Government					
Total		100.0	–	–	–
