= Simon Behrakis =

Australian politician

The Honourable Simon Behrakis MP

Parliamentary Secretary to the Premier
- In office 11 April 2024 – 19 July 2025
- Premier: Jeremy Rockliff

Parliamentary Secretary for Housing and Planning
- In office 11 April 2024 – 19 July 2025
- Minister: Felix Ellis

Member of the Tasmanian House of Assembly for Clark
- In office 24 October 2023 – 19 July 2025
- Preceded by: Elise Archer
- Succeeded by: Marcus Vermey

Alderman of the City of Hobart
- In office November 2018 – 24 October 2023

Personal details
- Born: 16 October 1989 (age 36) Hobart, Tasmania, Australia
- Party: Liberal Party

Simon Behrakis (born 16 October 1989) is an Australian politician, previously serving as a member for Clark in the Tasmanian House of Assembly.

Behrakis ran as a Liberal Party candidate at the 2018 and 2021 state elections. He was elected as an alderman to Hobart City Council at the 2018 local government elections, later being re-elected in 2022.

He was elected to parliament via a recount on 24 October 2023 after the resignation of former Attorney-General Elise Archer.

He was elected in his own right at the 2024 Tasmanian state election for the Tasmanian Liberal Party.

He was defeated at the 2025 Tasmanian state election by fellow Liberal candidate Marcus Vermey.
