= Charles Wooley =

Australian politician and former journalist

Lord Mayor of Hobart
- Incumbent
- Assumed office 30 October 2026
- Preceded by: Anna Reynolds

Deputy Mayor of Sorell
- In office 2022–2025
- Leader: Kerry Vincent; Janet Gatehouse
- Preceded by: Natham Reynolds
- Succeeded by: Michael Larkins

Personal details
- Born: 12 October 1948 (age 78) Isle of Arran, Scotland
- Occupation: Journalist; reporter; writer; TV personality; radio presenter; narrator; politician
- Known for: This Day Tonight; Nationwide; Four Corners; 60 Minutes

Charles Wooley (born 12 October 1948) is an Australian politician and former journalist. He started with ABC before joining the Nine Network, where he was a reporter for the news magazine program 60 Minutes. In October 2026, he was elected Lord Mayor of Hobart.

== Biography ==
=== Early life ===
Wooley was born on the Isle of Arran in Scotland, and moved to Launceston, Tasmania, aged three. At the age of 16 Wooley moved to Hobart where he gained an honours degree in history from the University of Tasmania. While he was studying he developed his journalistic skills by editing the university's student newspaper, Togatus, and was a member of the student theatre group, the Old Nick Company.

=== Career ===
Wooley returned to Launceston in 1970 to work as a cadet with The Examiner.

Two years later he joined ABC Radio and moved to Perth. He soon moved to television working on This Day Tonight, Nationwide, and Four Corners. He then served as the ABC's European correspondent based in London.

In 1986 he joined the Nine Network where he worked on Sunday and then A Current Affair. Wooley joined 60 Minutes in 1993.

His 2018 interview with New Zealand Prime Minister Jacinda Ardern was described as 'sexist' and 'creepy'.

== Politics ==
Wooley was elected as Deputy Mayor and Councillor of the Sorell Council at the 2022 Tasmanian local government elections. He resigned as Deputy Mayor and Councillor of Sorell Council as he had relocated out of the Sorell Council.

Wooley was elected Lord Mayor of Hobart and Councillor at the 2026 Tasmanian local government elections, succeeding Anna Renyolds.

== Author ==
He published a book of stories of his time travelling the world as a reporter called Travelling Tales. Wooley returned to Hobart in 1999 with his second wife Alona to raise their three children.

== Radio ==
From January 2006 until November 2008, Wolley hosted of Macquarie Regional RadioWorks' regional morning program, Charles Wooley Across Australia. The show aired 9 am to 12 pm weekdays on over 40 radio stations across Australia.

As well as presenting his radio show, Wooley continues to work on a casual basis for 60 Minutes and also narrates some television programs for the Nine Network. He is also the author of several books, including an upcoming guide to walks in and around Hobart, Tasmania.

== Personal life ==
Wooley is the father of six children. His daughter Anna Wooley is a documentary film maker.
