= 2004 New South Wales local elections =

Local government elections in Australia

- 27 March 2004

The 2004 New South Wales local elections were held on 27 March 2004 to elect the councils of the local government areas (LGAs) of New South Wales, Australia. Several councils also held mayoral elections.

Just one month before the elections, several councils were abolished and amalgamated.

== Candidates ==
One Nation contested at least five LGAs, although the party's incumbent Campbelltown councillor, Bob Thompson, left the party prior to the 2004 elections.

The Australian Jewish News observed that there was an "unprecedented number" of Jewish candidates contesting the elections.

== Party changes before elections ==
| Council | Ward | Councillor | Former party | New party | Date |
|---|---|---|---|---|---|
| Woollahra | Cooper | Geoff Rundle | Woollahra Action Committee | Residents First Woollahra | 27 September 2003 |

== Aftermath ==
=== Shoalhaven donations ===
Following the elections, The Sydney Morning Herald reported that Shoalhaven Independents Group − which won a majority on Shoalhaven City Council − was "helped by thousands of dollars of developers' money that paid for a television, radio and print election campaign" larger than that of any other candidate. The donations to SIG for the 2004 election totalled $91,017.

In 2008, it was found that SIG's funding declaration failed to disclose four years' worth of political donations, including Watson's unsuccessful campaign for the electorate of South Coast at the 2003 state election.

== See also ==
- 2004 Sydney City Council election
