= Duncan Spender =

Australian politician (born 1975)

Senator for New South Wales
- In office 20 March 2019 – 30 June 2019
- Preceded by: David Leyonhjelm

Personal details
- Born: 18 June 1975 (age 50) Brisbane, Queensland, Australia
- Party: Liberal Democrats

Duncan Peter James Spender (born 18 June 1975) is an Australian former politician. He briefly served as a Senator for New South Wales in 2019, filling a casual vacancy caused by the resignation of Liberal Democrats senator David Leyonhjelm. He had previously been Leyonhjelm's chief of staff.

== Early life ==
Spender was born in Brisbane. He is the son of former Federal Court (and Industrial Court) judge, Jeffrey Spender.

Spender first stood for parliament as an independent at the 1998 federal election, running unsuccessfully in the seat of Brisbane. He was a founding member of the Liberal Democratic Party in 2001. Before his appointment to the Senate, Spender worked as Leyonhjelm's chief of staff and senior adviser, and as the party's treasurer.

== Senate ==
Spender was appointed to the Senate on 20 March 2019, following Leyonhjelm's decision to resign to contest the Legislative Council at the 2019 New South Wales state election. As the Parliament of New South Wales was dissolved for the election, Spender's appointment was made by the Governor, David Hurley, with the appointment to be endorsed by the parliament in its next session. This occurred on 8 May 2019.

Spender's seat was for a term that ended on 30 June 2019. He sat in the Senate for just two days, and Senate Estimates for two days. He was a candidate at the 2019 Australian federal election, but was not successful, ending the LDP's representation in the Senate.

== Post-politics ==
In November 2019 Spender was appointed CEO of the Multicultural Council of Tasmania.

Spender unsuccessfully ran as a candidate in the 2022 Hobart City Council election.
