= Anna Reynolds (Australian politician) =

Australian politician

The Right Honourable The Lord Mayor of Hobart Anna Reynolds
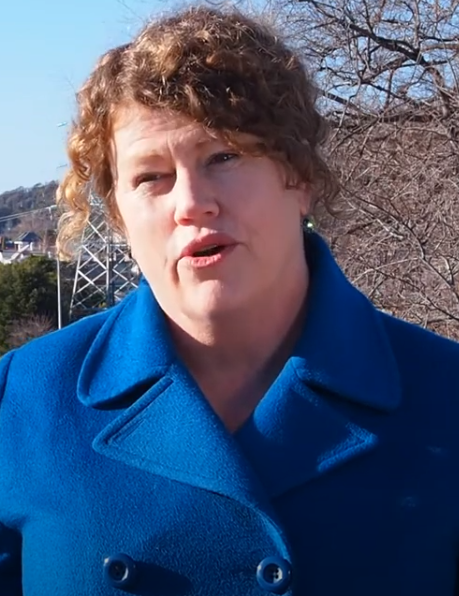
- Reynolds in 2013

Lord Mayor of Hobart
- In office November 2018 – 30 October 2026
- Deputy: Helen Burnet (2018−2024); Zelinda Sherlock (2024−26)
- Preceded by: Ron Christie
- Succeeded by: Charles Wooley

Councillor of the City of Hobart
- In office 2014–2026

Personal details
- Party: Your Hobart Independents (2022−)
- Other political affiliations: Independent (2018−2022); Greens (to 2018)
- Relations: Henry Reynolds (father); Margaret Reynolds (mother)
- Education: Australian National University; University of Technology Sydney

Anna Reynolds is an Australian politician who served as the 56th Lord Mayor of Hobart in Tasmania from November 2018 until October 2026. She was the third woman elected to the position and became the city’s fifth longest‑serving Lord Mayor.

Reynolds ran in the 2022 Hobart City Council election as the leader of the Your Hobart Independents ticket.

== Early life ==
Reynolds is the daughter of historian Henry Reynolds and former Queensland ALP senator Margaret Reynolds.

Reynolds graduated from Australian National University with a Bachelor of Arts in 1987, majoring in Political Science, and completed a Master of Management from the University of Technology Sydney in 1996.

== Career ==
Reynolds began her career establishing a community legal centre in Northern Queensland, before moving into a number of campaigning and advocacy roles. She served as President of the Cairns and far North Environment Centre (CAFNEC) during the 1990s.

After four years with the Australian Conservation Foundation, in 1998 Reynolds founded the Climate Action Network Australia - the Australian environment movement's first collective campaign on climate change.

In 2002, Reynolds moved on to her first of two roles with leading conservation organisation WWF. Between 2002 and 2005, Reynolds established and managed WWF Australia's first climate change program, then from 2005 to 2008, she held a role as Deputy Leader of WWF International's Global Climate Program.

In 2009, Reynolds moved to Hobart to take up an advisory role in the office of Bob Brown, then leader of the Australian Greens. She then became the CEO of the Multicultural Council of Tasmania in 2013.

== Politics ==
=== Early political involvement ===
Reynolds stood for the Greens in the seat of Denison at the 2013 federal election, losing to the incumbent independent MP Andrew Wilkie.

From 2014 to 2018, Reynolds was a Hobart City Council Alderman, with her candidacy backed by the Tasmanian Greens. She was Chair of the Parks and Recreation Committee during her term.

=== Lord Mayor of Hobart (2018-2026) ===
In November 2018, after standing as an independent, Reynolds was elected Lord Mayor of Hobart, securing 63.35% of the vote and beating former Lord Mayor Damon Thomas into second place. The turnout in the 2018 election was the highest since the 1990s, with 61.94% of eligible electors in the City of Hobart turning out to vote. Reynolds' election to Lord Mayor was only the third time a woman had been voted into the position.

During the 2018 campaign, Reynolds promoted a vision of providing "leadership for a more sustainable, caring and creative Hobart."

In 2022, Reynolds was re-elected to the position of Lord Mayor of Hobart, securing 52.41% of the vote and beating first-time candidate John Kelly, former owner of Hobart's State Cinema, into second place.

Renyolds did not contest the 2026 council elections, and was succeeded as Lord Mayor by former journalist Charles Wooley.

== Mayoralty and key initiatives ==
=== City recognition and international positioning ===
During Reynolds' tenure, Hobart was recognised internationally as one of the world's most liveable and interesting small cities, including being listed among the Top 10 Small Cities in a global assessment of urban quality and place-making.

Reynolds was a prominent advocate for increasing Hobart's international profile, supporting initiatives that positioned the city as:

- Australia's City of Science, highlighted in national science media coverage
- An Antarctic Gateway City, reflecting Hobart's long-standing scientific and logistical role
- A UNESCO City of Literature, following its 2023 designation
- A leader in global climate action, including through her role on the Board of the Global Covenant of Mayors for Climate and Energy

=== Urban planning and climate strategy ===
Reynolds oversaw major strategic planning reforms, including the Central Hobart Plan, Tasmania's first precinct-scale structure plan.

She also led the development of Hobart's Climate Change Strategy, which received national recognition for its approach to climate resilience and community engagement.

=== Environmental management and sustainability ===
Under Reynolds' leadership, Hobart became the first Australian jurisdiction to ban single-use plastics, following extensive public consultation and national media attention.

She supported environmental restoration projects including:

- Installation of a major underground litter trap to protect the Hobart Rivulet and its platypus habitat
- A multi-year rewinding program for the New Town Rivulet, involving habitat restoration and community engagement

=== Major city debates and advocacy ===
Reynolds publicly opposed several high-profile development proposals including:

- The proposed Kunanyi/Mount Wellington cable car, citing environmental and cultural concerns
- The proposed Hobart AFL stadium, reflecting community concerns over cost, location and urban planning impacts

=== Infrastructure and investment ===
During her term as Lord Mayor, Reynolds secured federal funding for upgrades to Hobart's ferry terminals and for progressing a visitor centre for Kunanyi/Mount Welington.

== Council relations and controversies ==
A code of conduct panel cautioned Reynolds in late 2023 for making "intentional physical contact" with then-resident (now councillor) Louise Elliot during a 2022 public meeting. The panel found her behavior reflected adversely on the council.

In 2025, Reynolds was found to have breached privacy laws by leaking confidential council information to activists. Reynolds said she was unaware that Councillor Elliot's booking of Hobart Town Hall for an anti-LGBTQI+ event could be defined as "private information". She said she responded to concerns raised by former Tasmanian of the Year Rodney Croome that the event could include discrimination against his community taking place on Council property.

Reynolds second term as Lord Mayor was marked by divisions with an oppositional group of councillors, including Councillor Louise Elliot, who lodged multiple code of conduct complaints against her. Many of these complaints were dismissed, as documented in official reports from the Tasmanian Department of Premier and Cabinet.

In 2024, Councillor Elliot was suspended for two months for behaviour directed at Reynolds and her family, following findings by a separate conduct panel.

== Departure from Office ==
In June 2026, Reynolds announced she would step down as Lord Mayor to take up a role with the Global Solar Council as Director of the 300 Million Solar Homes initiative. The role will see her working with the solar industry and city mayors to scale up deployment of household solar globally.

Civic offices
Preceded by Ron Christie	Lord Mayor of Hobart; 2018–present	Incumbent
