= No Parking Meters Party =

- Leader: Charles Matthews
- Founded: February 2006
- Dissolved: 2013
- Headquarters: Randwick, New South Wales
- Ideology: Anti-taxation; Consumer rights
- Randwick City Council: 1 / 15 (2008–2012)

Website
- noparkingmetersparty.org

The No Parking Meters Party was a minor political party in Australia. The party was registered from 2006 to 2013 with the New South Wales Electoral Commission to contest state and local council elections.

== Founding and policy ==
The party was founded in February 2006 as a single-issue party, seeing parking meters as "an extra tax on the family car". However, they now have broader policies: opposing tolls, pokie taxes, and red tape, among others. Founder and councillor Charles Matthews had a proposal to impose a $50 registration fee on bicycle riders, which would be used to help fund cycleways being built by the council, but it was later rejected by other councillors.

== Representation ==
The party had a representative on the City of Randwick, its founder, Charles Matthews. Matthews served on the Randwick council from 1977 to 2004, and was again elected in 2008. He served as the city's first mayor following its incorporation from 1990 to 1991. Matthews failed to be re-elected at the 2012 New South Wales local elections.

== Deregistration ==
In 2013 the Australian Electoral Commission deregistered No Parking Meters Party for having fewer than 500 members, the required amount for a political party in Australia. A review request by the party with a new member list was rejected after 2 of the 18 alleged members were randomly contacted by the AEC and denied being members of the party.
