= List of local government political parties in Australia =

In addition to political parties registered at the state and national level, a number of political parties and groups compete solely in local government elections in Australia.

Some of these parties are officially registered with electoral commissions in their respective states.

Non-local parties refers to parties in each state or territory that endorse candidates for local elections, but do not exclusively operate at a local level. This differs in each jurisdiction, with the Australian Labor Party and the Liberal Party of Australia only contesting in certain states.

The Australian Greens have endorsed councillors in all states and territories, except South Australia.

== New South Wales ==
=== Parties with representation ===
Political party			Est.	Leader	Seats		Ref.
Political party			Est.	Leader	LGA	Councillors (Note: Including directly-elected mayors (if applicable).)	Ref.
CMIT	—N/a	Clover Moore Independent Team (Note: Also known as Team Clover.)	2004	Clover Moore	Sydney	5 / 10	
CC	—N/a	Community Champions	2023	Kellie Darley	Parramatta	1 / 15	
CFTIP	—N/a	Community First Totally Independent Party	2024	Josh Cotter	Campbelltown	2 / 15	
GRRRP		Georges River Residents and Ratepayers	2021		Georges River	4 / 15	
GFM	—N/a	Good for Manly			Northern Beaches	1 / 15	
LMI	—N/a	Lake Mac Independents	2021		Lake Macquarie	3 / 11	
LCIT		Liverpool Community Independents Team	1994		Liverpool	3 / 13	
LWI	—N/a	Lorraine Wearne Independents		Lorraine Wearne	Parramatta	1 / 15	
OLC		Our Local Community	2013	Paul Garrard	Parramatta	4 / 15	
OLC		Our Local Community	2013	Paul Garrard	Cumberland	3 / 15	
OLC		Our Local Community	2013	Paul Garrard	Canada Bay	2 / 9	
PB	—N/a	Peaceful Bayside	2020 (Note: The party was formed as a local group in 2020, however it wasn't registered with the New South Wales Electoral Commission until 2023.)	Heidi Douglas	Bayside	1 / 15	
RFW		Residents First Woollahra	2003		Woollahra	5 / 15	
SM	—N/a	Serving Mosman		Carolyn Corrigan	Mosman	4 / 7	
SIG	—N/a	Shoalhaven Independents Group		Patricia White	Shoalhaven	4 / 13	
SI	—N/a	Strathfield Independents			Strathfield	1 / 7	
YNBIT	—N/a	Your Northern Beaches Independent Team	2017	Sue Heins	Northern Beaches	7 / 15	
YWI	—N/a	Yvonne Weldon Independents	2023	Yvonne Weldon	Sydney	1 / 10	

=== Parties without representation ===
Some parties are registered for local elections only, even though they may also contest state or federal elections.

Political party		Est.	Leader	LGA	Ref.
AC	Australian Christians	2011	Mike Crichton	Various	
DEM	Australian Democrats	1977	Lyn Allison	Various	
AFP	Australia First Party	1996	Jim Saleam	Various	
AFP	Australian Federation Party	2005	Glenn O'Rourke	Various	
UNI	Australia Multinational Unity INC	2023		Various	
BATT	Battler				
CCH	Central Coast Heart (Note: Known as Save Tuggerah Lakes until 2020.)	2004	Adam Troy	Central Coast	
CVA	Community Voice of Australia	2023			
FFP	Family First Party	2021	Lyle Shelton	Various	
KRA	Kogarah Residents' Association	2011		Georges River	
MI	Manly Independents	1980s	Barbara Aird	Northern Beaches	
SCI	Science Party NSW	2013	Andrea Leong	Various	
ART	The Arts Party NSW	2014	Barry Keldoulis	Various	
LIP	The Local Independent Party	2017		Various	

=== Non-local parties ===
Both the Labor Party and Liberal Party endorse candidates for local elections in a large number of New South Wales LGAs, as do several minor parties.

Political party		Est.	Leader	Councillors	Ref.
AJP	Animal Justice Party	2009		0 / 1,480	
AFP	Australia First Party	1996	Jim Saleam	0 / 1,480	
GRN	Australian Greens	1992	No leader	73 / 1,480	
ALP	Australian Labor Party	1891	Chris Minns	162 / 1,480	
LIB	Liberal Party of Australia	1945	Kellie Sloane	110 / 1,480	
LP	Libertarian Party	2001		10 / 1,480	
SFF	Shooters, Fishers and Farmers Party	1992	Robert Borsak	4 / 1,480	
SA	Socialist Alliance	2001		0 / 1,480	
SAP	Sustainable Australia Party	2010	William Bourke	1 / 1,480	
SBP	The Small Business Party	2017	Eddie Dogramaci	1 / 1,480	

== Northern Territory ==
=== Non-local parties ===
The Territory Labor Party and Country Liberal Party generally do not endorse local government candidates.

Political party		Est.	Leader	Councillors	Ref.
GRN	Australian Greens	1990	No leader	2 / 122	

== Queensland ==
At local elections in Queensland, candidates and incumbent councillors can formally register groups (which operate similarly to parties) with the state electoral commission. These groups often contain members of other political parties, including the ALP and LNP.

=== Parties with representation ===
Political party		Est.	Leader	Seats		Ref.
Political party		Est.	Leader	LGA	Councillors	Ref.
BBI	Better Brighter Ipswich	2024	Marnie Doyle	Ipswich	1 / 9	
UNI	Cairns Unity Team	2012	Terry James	Cairns	3 / 10	
MF	Mackay First (Note: Appeared on ballot as "Jacko's Team - Mackay First".)	2024	Steve Jackson	Mackay	4 / 11	
MICT	Mount Isa Community Team	2020	Danielle Slade	Mount Isa	1 / 7	
TB	Team Barwick	2023	Phil Barwick	Mount Isa	1 / 7	
EDEN	Team Eden	2023	Amy Eden	Cairns	2 / 10	
TGW	Team Greg Williamson	2024	Greg Williamson	Mackay	3 / 11	
TJH	Team Jenny Hill	2012	Jenny Hill	Townsville	4 / 11	
TMR	Team MacRae	2023	Peta MacRae	Mount Isa	1 / 7	
TC	TownsvilleCHANGE (Note: Appeared on ballot as "Change".)	2023	Paul Jacob	Townsville	2 / 11	
YVOE	Your Voice of Experience	2020	Paul Tully	Ipswich	2 / 9	

=== Parties without representation ===
Political party		Est.	Leader	LGA	Ref.
CCC	Community Centred and Connected	2024		Moreton Bay	
CF	Community First	2023	Denis Wall	Cairns	
BTB	Locals United – Back to Basics	2016	David Fletcher	Mount Isa	
NQSA	North Queensland State Alliance	2018	Peter Raffles	Cairns; Townsville	
SNTW	Say NO to WOKE	2023	Nathan Essex	Toowoomba	
TSI	Team Sheila Ireland	2024	Sheila Ireland	Ipswich	
WG	Westgarths	2024	Collective leadership	Toowoomba	
WFOC	Working For Our Community	2024	Steven Purcell; Helen Youngberry	Ipswich	

=== Non-local parties ===
The Queensland Labor Party and Liberal National Party contest Brisbane City Council elections, while several minor parties also endorse candidates across the state.

Political party		Est.	Leader	Councillors	Mayors	Ref.
AJP	Animal Justice Party	2009		0 / 562	0 / 77	
GRN	Australian Greens	1991	No leader	2 / 562	0 / 77	
ALP	Australian Labor Party	1892	Jared Cassidy (on Brisbane City Council)	5 / 562	0 / 77	
LCP	Legalise Cannabis	2020		0 / 562	0 / 77	
LNP	Liberal National Party	2008	Adrian Schrinner (on Brisbane City Council)	18 / 562	1 / 77	
LP	Libertarian Party	2001		0 / 562	0 / 77	
QS	Queensland Socialists	2025	Collective leadership	1 / 562	0 / 77	

== Tasmania ==
According to psephologist Kevin Bonham, tickets formed for Tasmanian local elections are "alliances of convenience that may have an ideological basis," not necessarily parties.

=== Parties with representation ===
Political party		Est.	Leader	Seats		Ref.
Political party		Est.	Leader	LGA	Councillors	Ref.
BC	Better Clarence	2022	Brendan Blomeley	Clarence	2 / 12	
KT	Kingborough Thrives	2020	Clare Glade-Wright	Kingborough	1 / 10	
YHI	Your Hobart Independents	2022	Anna Reynolds	Hobart	3 / 12	

=== Non-local parties ===
The Tasmanian Liberal Party and the Tasmanian Labor Party generally do not endorse local government candidates.

Political party		Est.	Leader	Councillors	Ref.
GRN	Australian Greens	1992	Rosalie Woodruff	9 / 263	

== Victoria ==
=== Parties with representation ===
Political party		Est.	Leader	Seats		Ref.
Political party		Est.	Leader	LGA	Councillors	Ref.
BTB	Back to Basics Team	2024	Rebecca Bourke	Surf Coast	2 / 9	
IM	Innovate Melbourne	2024	Andrew Rowse	Melbourne	1 / 11	
OCI	Our Community Independents	2024	Aidan McLindon	Whittlesea	1 / 11	
PEPP	People Empowering Port Phillip	2024	Serge Thomann	Port Phillip	1 / 9	
ROPP	Residents of Port Phillip (Note: Known as Ratepayers of Port Phillip until 2023.)	2020	None	Port Phillip	3 / 9	
TK	Team Kouta	2024	Anthony Koutoufides	Melbourne	1 / 11	
TM	Team Morgan	2016	Gary Morgan	Melbourne	1 / 11	
TNR	Team Nick Reece	2024	Nick Reece	Melbourne	4 / 11	
TW	Team Wood	2020	Arron Wood	Melbourne	1 / 11	
YFA	Yarra For All	2024	Stephen Jolly	Yarra	4 / 9	
YLI	Your Local Independents	2024	Oscar Yildiz	Merri-bek	2 / 11	

=== Parties without representation ===
Political party		Est.	Leader	Seats		Ref.
Political party		Est.	Leader	LGA	Councillors	Ref.
RUTBL	Rip Up the Bike Lanes!	2024	Anthony van der Craats	Melbourne	0 / 11	
TH	Team Hakim	2020	Jamal Hakim	Melbourne	0 / 11	
TEM	Team Elvis Martin	2024	Elvis Martin	Melbourne	0 / 11	
TP	Team Participate	2024	Asako Saito	Melbourne	0 / 11	
VFM	Voices for Melbourne	2024	Greg Bisinella	Melbourne	0 / 11	
YVMTM	Your Voice Matters to Me	2024	Krystle Mitchell	Melbourne	0 / 11	

=== Non-local parties ===
The Victorian Labor Party contests multiple LGAs with endorsed candidates, as do several minor parties.

Political party		Est.	Leader	Councillors	Ref.
AJP	Animal Justice Party	2009		1 / 656	
FUS	Fusion Party	2021		0 / 656	
GRN	Australian Greens	1992	Ellen Sandell	28 / 656	
ALP	Australian Labor Party	1891	Jacinta Allan	19 / 656	
LIB	Liberal Party	1945	Jess Wilson	1 / 656	
LP	Libertarian Party	2001		2 / 656	
SA	Socialist Alliance	2001		1 / 656	
VS	Victorian Socialists	2018		1 / 656	

== Western Australia ==
Local elections in Western Australia are officially non-partisan, and the vast majority of candidates and councillors are not members of any political party.

=== Non-local parties ===
Political party		Est.	Leader	Councillors	Ref.
GRN	Australian Greens	1990		2 / 1,200	

== Former parties ==
=== Parties with representation ===
Political party		Period	Leader	State	Seats (Note: The party's seats is determined by the party's maximum number of seats acquired during its tenure.)		Ref.
Political party		Period	Leader	State	LGA	Councillors	Ref.
ACRM	Albury Citizens and Ratepayers Movement	20??–2019	Various	NSW	Albury	1 / 9	
AWP	Australian Women's Party	2019–2023	Dai Le	NSW	Fairfield	3 / 13	
BTIT	Bob Thompson's Independent Team	20??–2020	Bob Thompson	NSW	Campbelltown	1 / 15	
BCP	Brisbane Civic Party	1973–1976	John Andrews	QLD	Brisbane	1 / 21	
BHF	Broken Hill First Team	2004–2007	Ron Page	NSW	Broken Hill	2 / 10	
UNI	Cairns Unity Team	1994–2008	Kevin Byrne	QLD	Cairns City		
CRPL	Camberwell Ratepayers' Protection League	1921–1922	A. A. Williams	VIC	Camberwell	2 / 9	
CMO	Citizens' Municipal Organisation	1935–1976	Various	QLD	Brisbane		
CUP	Citizens' United Party	19??–19??	Daniel Connolly	QLD	Warwick		
CRA	Civic Reform Association (Note: Known officially as the Citizens' Reform Association until 1960.)	1920–1991	Various	NSW	Sydney	12 / 20	
CFA	Community First Alliance	2004–2008	Sonya Phillips	NSW	Baulkham Hills	2 / 12	
CFA	Community First Alliance	2004–2008	Sonya Phillips	NSW	Sutherland	2 / 15	
CFA	Community First Alliance	2004–2008	Sonya Phillips	NSW	Warringah	1 / 10	
CFT	Community First Team	2004–2024	Josh Cotter	NSW	Campbelltown	1 / 15	
CSESCK	Community Service Environment; Save Campbelltown Koalas	2012–2018	Sue Dobson	NSW	Campbelltown	1 / 15	
GIP	Glen Iris Progress Association	1920s–1940s		VIC	Camberwell	1 / 9	
GWA	Greg Williamson Alliance	2016–2024	Greg Williamson	QLD	Mackay	7 / 11	
ICV	Independent Community Voice (Note: Known as Burwood Community Voice until 2016.)	1997–2023	Lesley Furneaux-Cook	NSW	Burwood	1 / 7	
ILA	Independent Lake Alliance	????–2021	Greg Piper	NSW	Lake Macquarie	6 / 13	
IRP	Independent Reform Party	1933–19??	John Allman	QLD	Warwick		
JAT	Jayne Arlett's Team (Note: Also known as Team Arlett; appeared on ballot as "Vote 1 Jayne Arlett's Team".)	2015–2016	Jayne Arlett	QLD	Townsville	5 / 11	
KPI	Kerryn Phelps Independents	2018–2021	Kerryn Phelps	NSW	Sydney	1 / 10	
LSI	Living Sydney Independents (Note: Also known as Living City Independents.)	1994–2004	Various	NSW	Sydney		
MF	Melbourne First	1996–20??	Ivan Deveson	VIC	Melbourne		
ML	Melbourne Living	2001–2012	John So (2001–2008); Gary Singer (2012)	VIC	Melbourne		
MPP	Municipal Progressive Party	1920s–1930s	Various	NSW	Auburn	7 / 12	
NBCA	Northern Beaches Community Alliance	2017–2019	Alex McTaggart	NSW	Northern Beaches	1 / 15	
OSF	Our Sustainable Future	20??–2024	Elly Bird	NSW	Lismore	1 / 11	
PBLG	Parramatta Better Local Government Party	2008–2012	Michael McDermott	NSW	Parramatta	1 / 15	
PMLP	Progressive Municipal Labor Party	19??–1944		NSW	Cessnock Municipality	5 / 9	
PP	Progressive Party	19??–19??		QLD	Townsville		
RAGAA	Residents Action Group for Auburn Area	2004–2016		NSW	Auburn	2 / 10	
SWI	Shire Watch Independents	1999–2016	Various	NSW	Sutherland	5 / 15	
SCPA	South Camberwell Progress Association	1930–1933		VIC	Camberwell	1 / 9	
SA	Sydney Alliance	1999–2003	Kathryn Greiner	NSW	Sydney		
SMIT	Sydney Matters Independent Team	2016–2017	Angela Vithoulkas	NSW	Sydney	1 / 10	
SI	Sydney Independents	2003–2004	Dixie Coulton (2003); John Fowler (2004)	NSW	Sydney	1 / 10	
TA	Team Adelaide	2018–2022	Alexander Hyde	SA	Adelaide	7 / 12	
TD	Team Doyle	2008–2018	Robert Doyle	VIC	Melbourne	6 / 11	
TJW	Team Josh Weazel	2020–2020	Josh Weazel	QLD	Woorabinda	3 / 5	
TSC	Team Sally Capp	2020–2024	Sally Capp	VIC	Melbourne	4 / 11	
TT	Team Tyrell	2008–2012	Les Tyrell	QLD	Townsville	12 / 13	
BST	The Ben Shields Team	2020–2022	Ben Shields	NSW	Dubbo	1 / 10	
LST	The Living Sydney Team	2012–2016	Angela Vithoulkas (until 2014)	NSW	Sydney	1 / 10	
TLCP	Totally Locally Committed Party	2004–2024	Fred Borg (2004–16); Warren Morrison (2016–24)	NSW	Campbelltown	2 / 15	
TF	Townsville First	2012–2016	Dale Last	QLD	Townsville	7 / 11	
WI	Woodville Independents	2012–2013	Paul Garrard	NSW	Parramatta	1 / 15	
WI	Woollahra Action Committee	1960s–2004		NSW	Woollahra		
YWP	Your Warringah (Note: Known as Wake Up Warringah until 2012, later became Your Northern Beaches.)	2008–2017	Michael Regan	NSW	Warringah	6 / 10	

=== Parties without representation ===
Political party		Period	Leader	State	LGA	Ref.
ILV	Artemis Pattichi – Independent Local Voice	2020–2020	Artemis Pattichi	VIC	Melbourne	
CBC	Campaign for a Better City	2004–2004	Paul Mees	VIC	Yarra	
CFP	Christian Freedom Party	2023–2024	Milan Maksimovic	NSW	None (Note: Party deregistered in January 2024 and did not contest any elections.)	
CV	Community Voice (Note: Although the ticket was led by the Greens, only three out of eight candidates (including mayoral candidate Jenny Stirling) were Greens members.)	2007–2008	Jenny Stirling	QLD	Townsville	
CI	Cumberland Independents	2018–2018		NSW	Cumberland	
IM	Innovate Melbourne	2020–2020	Andrew Rowse	VIC	Melbourne	
IWBOM	It Will Be Okay Melbourne	2020–2020	Joseph Burke	VIC	Melbourne	
TFT	It's Time for Townsville	2020–2020	Greg Dowling	QLD	Townsville	
LI	Leading Independents	20??–2020		NSW		
LCP	Liberal Civic Party	1967–1967	Des Neylan	QLD	Brisbane	
LTL	Listening To Locals	2016–2016	Richard Foster	VIC	Melbourne	
MWAM	Melbourne – We All Matter	2020–2020	Sainab Sheikh	VIC	Melbourne	
MV	Melburnian Voice	2016–2016	Joseph Sarraf	VIC	Melbourne	
OHCT	Our Hobart Community Team	2022–2022	Marcus Bai	TAS	Hobart	
PCMB	Phil Cleary Means Business	2016–2016	Phil Cleary	VIC	Melbourne	
RF	Residents First	2020–2020	Janette Corcoran	VIC	Melbourne	
RF	Richmond First	2020–2021	David Horseman	VIC	Yarra	
SMWI	Serving Melbourne With Integrity	2016–2016	Marcus Fielding	VIC	Melbourne	
TIAE	Stephen Mayne T.I.A.E.	2016–2016	Stephen Mayne	VIC	Melbourne	
SM	Strengthening Melbourne	2016–2016	Ron Hunt	VIC	Melbourne	
TZ	Team Zorin	2020–2020	Wayne Tseng	VIC	Melbourne	
THA	The Heritage Agenda	2016–2016	Adam Munro Ford	VIC	Melbourne	
LOTH	The Light On The Hill Team	2016–2016	Jim Ward	VIC	Melbourne	
PI	The Parramatta Independents	2008–2012	Paul Dillon	NSW	Parramatta	
UGC	Unite GC	2007–2008	Rob Molhoek	QLD	Gold Coast	
YMTGID	Your Melbourne Team Get It Done	2020–2020	Mary Poulakis	VIC	Melbourne	

== See also ==
- Independent Labor (Australia)
- Independent Liberal (Australia)
- Independent National (Australia)
