= Beverley Pinder =

Beauty pageant winner

Councillor of the City of Melbourne
- In office 2012–2016
- In office 2018–2020

Personal details
- Party: Team Arron Wood (2020)
- Other political affiliations: Team Doyle (2012-2018)
- Spouse: Russell Mortimer
- Education: Elwood High School; Springvale High School
- Occupation: Public Relations Consultant with Rowland Pinder
- Awards: 1978 Miss Universe Australia

Beverley Pinder (born 12 July 1955) is an Australian public relations executive, former civil servant and beauty pageant the titleholder who won 1978 Miss Universe Australia.

== Personal life ==
Beverley Pinder was born on 12 July 1955 in Colombo, Sri Lanka. Pinder, her parents and four siblings moved to Australia from Sri Lanka in the 1960s. She attended Elwood High School.

Pinder is married to businessman and IT entrepreneur Russell Mortimer and has twin stepsons, Jake and Andre.

== Career ==
She is an Australian public relations executive, who was a former civil servant and 1978 Miss Universe Australia. Since 1985, she has been the Managing Director of Rowland Pinder Communication Consultants. Pinder is also a green-belt in Karate.

== Modelling (as a Teenager) ==
Starting out in 1970 with her win in the Junior Miss Victoria Contest (14–16 years). She entered many pageants in her career, from the Victorian Beach Girl, Miss Sportsgirl, Young Teen, Miss Springvale, Waverley Queen of Hearts, Quest of Quests and much more. She was a regular on the front page of the Herald and Sun News Pictorial and even scored a page three in The Age. Her final swansong was the Australian Beauty Queen (1978) with judges Ita Buttrose, Sir Robert Helpmann, Kym Bonython and John Waters. This was the pinnacle for Beverley and the one that lead her to a path of public relations and her business life.

== The Shift from Runways to Boardrooms ==
Pinder founded Beverley Pinder Pty Ltd in 1985. Her acquisition of the Rowland Company's Melbourne office in 1992-93 meant a sudden and welcome expansion, although this was tempered by ‘the recession we had to have'.

Pinder has worked for roughly 40 years in the field of Public Relations. Much of her job as a communicator throughout the years has been work for clients in corporate and marketing communications. She is a specialist in Corporate and Marketing Communications, Reputation Management and Strategic Counsel – with a strong belief in ‘preserving reputation at any cost’.

== City of Melbourne ==
Pinder was a Councillor with the City of Melbourne from October 2012 to 2016, being elected on then Lord Mayor, Robert Doyle's “Team Doyle” ticket. She was the Chair of the Marketing Melbourne portfolio, responsible for guiding Events, Tourism and Marketing for the city and was deputy chair of Arts and Culture at the City of Melbourne.

Pinder returned to the Melbourne City Council on 15 January 2018 on a countback following the resignation of councillor Tessa Sullivan on 15 December 2017. She was the Chair of People City portfolio, and chairs the Homelessness Advisory Committee, the Disability Advisory Committee and the Family and Children's Advisory Committee. Pinder is also the Deputy Chair, Small Business, Retail and Hospitality.

As a Councillor of the City of Melbourne, Pinder is currently the Chair, of the People City portfolio. She is steeped in this portfolio even to the extent of taking to the streets in June 2018 during the City's bi-Annual StreetCount program (a point-in-time count of those people sleeping on the streets). Her deep sense of commitment to family and community saw her vigorously advocate in June 2018 against the abrupt withdrawal of services of a childcare centre in the central CBD; the result of which was a unanimous vote by Councillors to have the Centre open until 21 December 2018, four months after the recommended closure date.

Intending to stand as an independent, she met with Irene Goonan – a former Councillor for City of Melbourne to discuss her prospects. Soon she received a call from sitting Mayor Doyle, offering her the third spot on his ticket: “If I get in, so will you” he said. Pinder was elected to Council in October 2012 as the Chair of the Marketing Melbourne portfolio and Deputy Chair of Arts and Culture. After completing her first term as a councillor in 2016, Pinder returned to attend to her business full-time and to look after her aging mother. She returned to council in January 2018, as the Chair of the People City portfolio and deputy chair of small business, retail, and hospitality.

People City portfolio includes: • Family services: • Children's services • Youth • Community Care: • Aged Care • Disability services • Ethnic services • Emergency management/services • Social and affordable housing • Homelessness • City safety • Health and wellbeing: • Community sports • Recreation services • Multiculturalism • Public space (including streetscapes but excluding parklands and trees) • Diversity and inclusion • Social policy • Community grants • Community engagement relating to the above (11).

== Involvement with Charities ==
Pinder has devoted significant time, energy and effort - over the years to the not-for-profit sector and has been involved in numerous charities such as Harold Blair Aboriginal Children's Holiday Project and Sacred Heart Mission. She has also been involved with the LightHouse Foundation, Crisis Line, Vicdor Living Centres, HELP Sri Lanka and the Gawler Foundation. She currently sits on the Board of the National Institute of Integrative Medicine and is a Patron of the Bob Maguire Foundation. Pinder donated her salary for the first six months of her second term on Council to the Father Bob Mcguire Foundation.

== Portrait ==
Pinder's high school friend and a known artist Rachael Rovay painted her portrait for two Archibald Prize entries: once in 2009 and the other in 2014. Both portraits were hung in the Archibald Prize's Salon des Refusés exhibition.
