= Olivia Ball =

Human rights advocate and city councillor

Councillor of the City of Melbourne
- Incumbent
- Assumed office 2020

Personal details
- Party: Greens
- Education: University of Melbourne, University of London, Monash University
- Occupation: Human rights advocate, politician

Dr Olivia Ball is an Australian human rights advocate and politician. She is serving as a member of the City of Melbourne council in Victoria, Australia.

== Qualifications ==
Ball has a Masters in human rights from London University and a PhD in international human rights law awarded by the Castan Centre for Human Rights Law at Monash University.

== Career ==
In her early career Ball worked as a psychologist before becoming a human rights researcher and activist. Together with Paul Gready she co-authored The No-Nonsense Guide to Human Rights. In 2014, Ball and Nicholas Toonen founded Remedy Australia, a non-government organisation which monitors complaints to the United Nations about Australia's human rights violations and advocates for the right to an effective remedy where UN committees uphold such complaints. The organisation was established on the 20th anniversary of the Toonen Decision.

Ball has worked as a school teacher in Tonga and in the drug outreach program at Fitzroy Legal Service.

== Politics ==
Ball has been a member of the Australian Greens Victoria since 2001. She cites as her inspiration for joining the party “The Greens”, a work by former Australian senator Bob Brown and ethicist Peter Singer. She was involved in several campaigns before being elected to the council of the City of Melbourne in the 2020 election.

=== 2016 Federal Election ===
Ball contested the electorate of Maribyrnong in the 2016 Australian Federal election, losing to incumbent and then leader of the ALP, Bill Shorten.

=== 2016 City of Melbourne Mayoral Election ===
Ball contested the 2016 Mayoral Election in the City of Melbourne. She was the sole female lord mayoral candidate and attracted the support of former Lord Mayors Lecki Ord and Winsome McCaughey. She was the runner-up to incumbent Lord Mayor Robert Doyle.

=== 2020 City of Melbourne Council Election ===
Ball stood in the City of Melbourne Council Election in 2020 as the Victorian Greens' second candidate, winning office along with lead candidate Rohan Leppert.

=== 2024 City of Melbourne Council Election ===
Ball was preselected as the Victorian Greens' lead candidate for the City of Melbourne Council Election in 2024 following the decision by Rohan Leppert not to recontest the election. She was reelected at the October election and is the sole Greens member on council.

== Advocacy ==
Ball opposes the practise of arbitrary detention in Australia and argues that it "falls to us to press our government to do the right thing." She has criticised income tax cuts whilst "our elderly are dying in need of adequate care" and that we "must expect more of our government." She has called on Australia to ratify the UN Treaty on the Prohibition of Nuclear Weapons.

She supports a medically supervised injecting service in the City of Melbourne and advocates for increased naloxone availability across the city as a harm reduction measure.

Ball has called on state & local government to counter radicalisation and extremism, defended the right to protest, and condemned Council's spending on security guards and CCTV. She opposes rates freezes and supports the flexibility to work from home and means testing for $2 pool entry.

== Personal life ==
Ball was born in East Melbourne and lives in the Melbourne suburb of Carlton.
