= Results of the 2024 Victorian local elections in Inner Melbourne =

2024 Victorian local elections (Inner Melbourne)
- October 2024

This is a list of results for the 2024 Victorian local elections in the Inner Melbourne region.

Inner Melbourne covers three local government areas (LGAs) − Melbourne City Council, Port Phillip City Council, and Yarra City Council.

== Melbourne ==
Melbourne City Council is elected in a single multi-member ward which electing nine councillors through single transferable voting and a leadership team (consisting of a lord mayor and deputy lord mayor) through Instant-runoff voting with each team of candidates running as a single unit.

=== Leadership Team ===
2024 Victorian local elections: Melbourne (Leadership Team)
Party	Candidate	Votes	%	±%
Team Nick Reece	Nick Reece (Note: Also a Labor Party member.); Roshena Campbell (Note: Also a Liberal Party member.)	20,523	23.36	−8.24 (Note: Compared with Team Sally Capp at the 2020 election.)
Greens	Roxane Ingleton; Marley McRae McLeod	12,445	14.17	−2.51
Liberal	Mariam Riza; Luke Martin	11,985	13.64	+13.64
Team Kouta	Anthony Koutoufides; Intaj Khan	11,345	12.91	+12.91
Team Wood	Arron Wood; Erin Deering	8,856	10.08	−5.18
Labor	Phil Reed; Virginia Wills	5,930	6.75	−2.70
Team Morgan	Gary Morgan; Liz Ge	4,281	4.87	+2.10
Team Hakim	Jamal Hakim; Esther Anatolitis	3,766	4.29	+4.29
Rip Up the Bike Lanes!	Anthony van der Craats; David Keith Cragg	3,706	4.22	+4.22
Voices for Melbourne	Greg Bisinella; Megan Stevenson	3,079	3.50	+3.50
Animal Justice	Eylem Kim; Bruce Poon	1,936	2.20	+2.20
Total formal votes		87,852	95.02	−1.60
Informal votes		4,603	4.98	+1.60
Turnout		92,455	67.73	+1.00
Two-candidate-preferred result
Team Nick Reece	Nick Reece; Roshena Campbell	54,018	61.49	+8.05 (Note: Compared with Team Sally Capp at the 2020 election.)
Greens	Roxane Ingleton; Marley McRae McLeod	33,834	38.51	+38.51
Team Nick Reece hold		Swing	N/A	

=== Councillors ===
2024 Victorian local elections: Melbourne (councillors)
Party	Candidate	Votes	%	±%
Team Nick Reece	1. Kevin Louey (elected 1); 2. Mark Scott (elected 6); 3. Lisa Teh; 4. Jannine Pattison; 5. Hamdi Ali; 6. Suzanne Stanley; 7. Simone Hartley-Keane	18,558	20.71	–6.02 (Note: Compared with Team Sally Capp at the 2020 election.)
Liberal	1. Owen Guest (elected 2); 2. You Li Liston	12,841	14.33	+14.33
Greens	1. Olivia Ball (elected 3); 2. Aaron Moon; 3. Barry Berih	12,692	14.16	–1.84
Team Kouta	1. Gladys Liu (elected 4); 2. Zaim Ramani; 3. Emma Elizabeth Carney; 4. Olivia Tjandramulia	10,588	11.82	+11.82
Team Wood	1. Philip Le Liu (elected 5); 2. Cathy Oke; 3. Nicolas Paul Zervos; 4. Hala Nur; 5. Michael-Lee Caiafa; 6. Hope Lai Wei; 7. Steve Michelson	9,366	10.45	–2.90
Labor	1. Davydd Griffiths (elected 9); 2. Sainab Abdi Sheikh; 3. Michael Aleisi	6,494	7.25	–4.39
Team Morgan	1. Rafael Camillo (elected 7); 2. William Caldwell	3,654	4.08	+2.39
Rip Up the Bike Lanes!	1. Sandra Gee; 2. Pratap Singh	2,878	3.21	+3.21
Team Hakim	1. Michael Smith; 2. Lawrence Lam; 3. Judy Gao	2,813	3.14	+2.73
Voices for Melbourne	1. Mary Masters; 2. James Vasilev-Robertson	2,689	3.00	+3.00
Animal Justice	1. Aashna Katyal; 2. Rabin Bangaar	1,688	1.88	+0.19
Innovate Melbourne	1. Andrew Rowse (elected 8); 2. Jesse Greenwood	1,547	1.73	+0.84
Your Voice Matters to Me	1. Krystle Mitchell (Note: Also a Libertarian Party member.); 2. Jayden Durbin	1,134	1.27	+1.27
Team Elvis Martin	1. Elvis Martin; 2. Sophy Galbally; 3. Mavi Mujral; 4. Jing Lin; 5. Paul James Moore; 6. Melissa Rymer; 7. James Cullen; 8. Carole Kenny-Sarasa	1,000	1.12	+1.12
Victorian Socialists	1. Daniel Nair Dadich; 2. Ben Fok	500	0.56	–1.02
Team Participate	1. Asako Saito; 2. Sam Janda	461	0.51	+0.51
Ungrouped	Ekaterina Send; Jake Land; Aishwarya Kansakar; Mohamed Yusuf; Callum John French	703	0.78	+0.42
Total formal votes		89,606	97.67	–0.48
Informal votes		2,139	2.33	+0.48
Turnout		91,745	67.21	+0.67

== Port Phillip ==
2024 Port Phillip City Council election
- 26 October 2024

All 9 seats on Port Phillip City Council 5 seats needed for a majority

	First party	Second party	Third party
	IND
Party	Independents	Labor	Greens
Last election	1 seat	2 seats	2 seats
Seats before	1	3	1
Seats won	3	2	0
Seat change	▲2	▼1	▼1
Primary vote	19,090	9,213	9,171
Percentage	36.21%	17.48%	17.40%
Swing	▲21.74	▼6.24	▼3.83
	Fourth party	Fifth party	Sixth party
	RoPP	PEPP	IND
Party	Residents	PEPP	Ind. Liberal
Last election	2 seats	Did not exist	2 seats
Seats before	2	0	2
Seats won	3	1	0
Seat change	▲1	▲1	▼2
Primary vote	8,279	5,465	2,038
Percentage	14.85%	10.37%	3.87%
Swing	▼1.04	▲10.37	▼16.49
- 2024 ward boundaries. Expand the map and click on a ward to see the ward name
Largest party before election
No overall control
Subsequent largest party
TBD

Port Phillip City Council is composed of nine single-member wards. Prior to the 2024 election, it was composed of three multi-member wards with three members each, but the electoral structure changed as a result of the Local Government Act 2020.

=== Port Phillip results ===
2024 Victorian local elections: Port Phillip
Party	Votes	%	Swing	Seats	Change
Independent	19,090	36.21	+21.74	3	▲2
Labor	9,213	17.48	−6.24	2	Steady
Greens	9,171	17.40	−3.83	0	▼2
Residents of Port Phillip	7,279	13.81	−1.04	3	▲1
People Empowering Port Phillip	5,465	10.37	+10.37	1	▲1
Independent Liberal	2,038	3.87	−16.49	0	▼2
Victorian Socialists	461	0.87	+0.87	0	Steady
Formal votes	52,717	97.66	+1.57		
Informal votes	1,262	2.34	−1.57		
Total	53,979	100.0		9	
Registered voters / turnout	74,095	72.85	+7.12		

=== Albert Park ===
2024 Victorian local elections: Albert Park Ward
Party	Candidate	Votes	%	±%
Residents of Port Phillip	Rod Hardy	2,745	41.14	
Independent	Rhonda Small	1,524	22.84	
People Empowering	Beverley Pinder	731	10.96	
Independent Liberal	Lauren Sherson	670	10.04	
Greens	Connor Slattery	619	9.28	
Independent	Joan B. Lamb	195	2.92	
Independent	Ellie Williams	188	2.82	
Total formal votes		6,672	97.76	
Informal votes		153	2.24	
Turnout		6,825	78.91	
After distribution of preferences
Residents of Port Phillip	Rod Hardy	3,502	52.49	
Independent	Rhonda Small	2,088	31.29	
People Empowering	Beverley Pinder	1,082	16.22	
Residents of Port Phillip win		(new ward)		

=== Alma ===
2024 Victorian local elections: Alma Ward
Party	Candidate	Votes	%	±%
Independent	Justin Halliday	1,703	29.80	
Greens	Josie Foster	1,216	21.28	
Residents of Port Phillip	Brendan Perera	1,170	20.48	
Independent	Dick Gross	1,021	17.87	
Labor	Jill Horman	604	10.57	
Total formal votes		5,714	98.03	
Informal votes		115	1.97	
Turnout		5,829	71.44	
Two-candidate-preferred result
Independent	Justin Halliday	3,301	57.77	
Greens	Josie Foster	2,413	42.23	
Independent win		(new ward)		

=== Balaclava ===
2024 Victorian local elections: Balaclava Ward
Party	Candidate	Votes	%	±%
Labor	Libby Buckingham	1,752	27.40	
Greens	Rachel Iampolski	1,712	26.78	
Independent	Berri Wajsbort	801	12.53	
People Empowering	Michelle Di Donna	734	11.48	
Independent	Alex Darton	724	11.32	
Independent	Alex Kats	420	6.57	
Independent Liberal	Jon Webster	250	3.91	
Total formal votes		6,393	97.53	
Informal votes		162	2.47	
Turnout		6,555	71.77	
Two-candidate-preferred result
Labor	Libby Buckingham	3,632	56.81	
Greens	Rachel Iampolski	2,761	43.19	
Labor win		(new ward)		

=== Elwood ===
2024 Victorian local elections: Elwood Ward
Party	Candidate	Votes	%	±%
Greens	Liliana Carranza	1,679	29.76	
Labor	Louise Crawford	1,647	29.20	
People Empowering	Janet de Silva	1,467	26.01	
Independent	Sally Gibson	848	15.03	
Total formal votes		5,641	97.71	
Informal votes		132	2.29	
Turnout		5,773	72.74	
Two-candidate-preferred result
Labor	Louise Crawford	3,015	53.45	
Greens	Liliana Carranza	2,626	46.55	
Labor win		(new ward)		

=== Lakeside ===
2024 Victorian local elections: Lakeside Ward
Party	Candidate	Votes	%	±%
Residents of Port Phillip	Bryan Mears	1,694	32.72	
Greens	Ivy Pierlot	1,168	22.56	
Independent Liberal	Jo McDonald	1,118	21.59	
Labor	Barney Moore	757	14.62	
People Empowering	Levi Silcox	441	8.52	
Total formal votes		5,178	97.18	
Informal votes		150	2.82	
Turnout		5,328	69.92	
Two-candidate-preferred result
Residents of Port Phillip	Bryan Mears	2,950	56.97	
Greens	Ivy Pierlot	2,228	43.03	
Residents of Port Phillip win		(new ward)		

=== Montague ===
2024 Victorian local elections: Montague Ward
Party	Candidate	Votes	%	±%
Independent	Judy Sahayanathan	1,487	27.57	
Independent	Alex Makin	1,466	27.18	
Labor	Peter Martin	1,383	25.64	
Independent	David Knoff	602	11.16	
People Empowering	Chris Schwarze	456	8.45	
Total formal votes		5,394	97.28	
Informal votes		151	2.72	
Turnout		5,545	74.79	
Two-candidate-preferred result
Independent	Alex Makin	2,843	52.71	
Independent	Judy Sahayanathan	2,551	47.29	
Independent win		(new ward)		

=== Port Melbourne ===
2024 Victorian local elections: Port Melbourne Ward
Party	Candidate	Votes	%	±%
Independent	Heather Cunsolo	2,667	42.39	
Independent	Adrian William King	1,617	25.70	
Greens	Richard Whitfield	906	14.40	
Labor	David Wright	784	12.46	
People Empowering	Sabina Sablok	318	5.05	
Total formal votes		6,289	97.99	
Informal votes		129	2.01	
Turnout		6,418	77.07	
Two-candidate-preferred result
Independent	Heather Cunsolo	4,110	65.35	
Independent	Adrian William King	2,179	34.65	
Independent win		(new ward)		

=== South Melbourne ===
2024 Victorian local elections: South Melbourne Ward
Party	Candidate	Votes	%	±%
Residents of Port Phillip	Beti Jay	1,670	29.72	
Labor	Bridget Mullahy	1,472	26.20	
Independent	Trina Lewis	1,378	24.52	
Greens	Earl James	1,099	19.56	
Total formal votes		5,619	97.81	
Informal votes		126	2.19	
Turnout		5,745	72.47	
Two-candidate-preferred result
Residents of Port Phillip	Beti Jay	3,192	56.81	
Labor	Bridget Mullahy	2,427	43.19	
Residents of Port Phillip win		(new ward)		

=== St Kilda ===
2024 Victorian local elections: St Kilda Ward
Party	Candidate	Votes	%	±%
Independent	Jenni Roper	1,528	26.31	
People Empowering	Serge Thomann	1,320	22.73	
Independent	David Blakeley	915	15.75	
Labor	Robbie Nyaguy	812	13.98	
Greens	Tim Baxter	772	13.29	
Victorian Socialists	Colleen Bolger	461	7.94	
Total formal votes		5,808	97.42	
Informal votes		154	2.58	
Turnout		5,962	66.77	
Two-candidate-preferred result
People Empowering	Serge Thomann	2,994	51.55	
Independent	Jenni Roper	2,814	48.45	
People Empowering win		(new ward)		

== Yarra ==
2024 Yarra City Council election
- 26 October 2024

All 9 seats on Yarra City Council 5 seats needed for a majority
- Registered: 68,723
- Turnout: 73.04% (▲3.07)
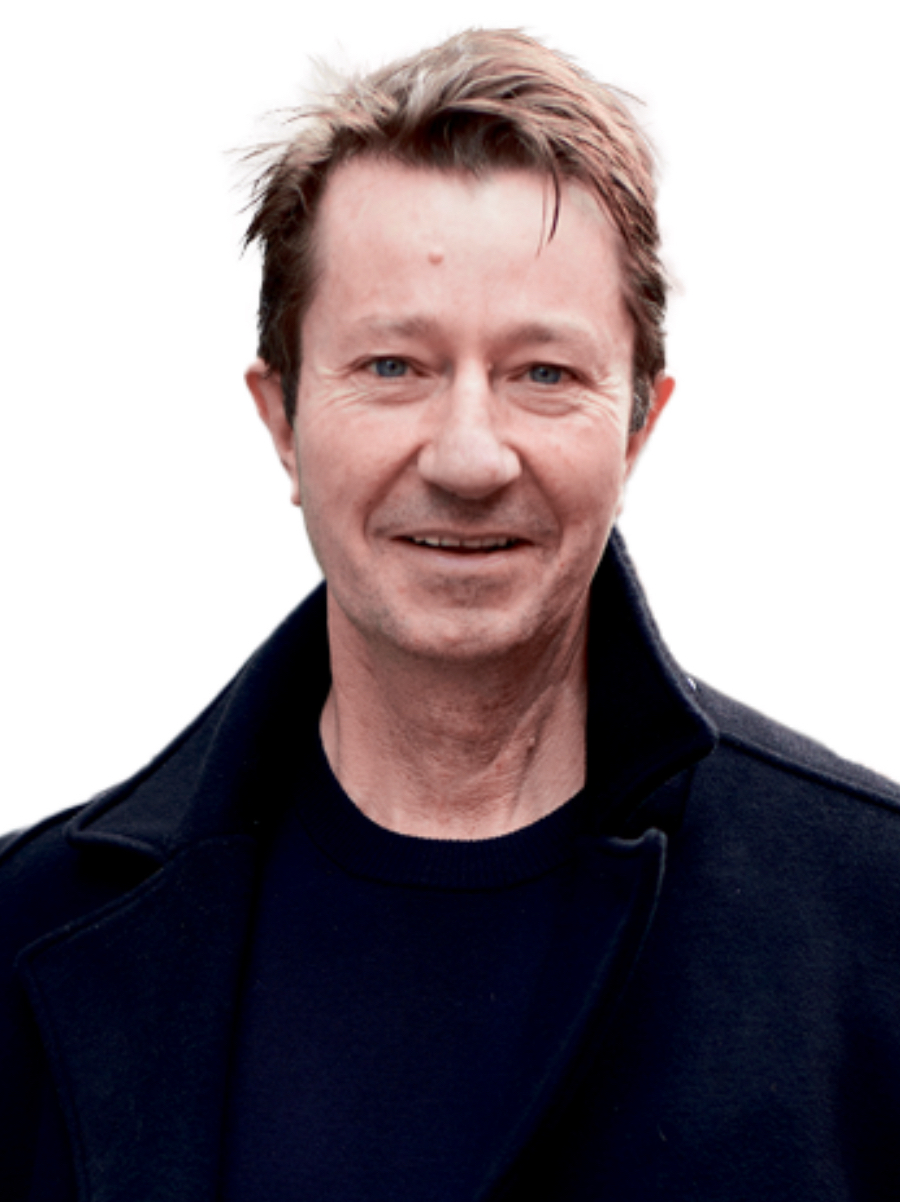

	First party	Second party
Leader	Stephen Jolly	N/A
Party	Yarra For All	Greens
Last election	Did not exist	5 seats
Seats before	3	2
Seats won	4	2
Seat change	▲1	Steady
Primary vote	16,157	13,108
Percentage	32.80%	26.05%
Swing	▲15.85 (Note: Compared to the results of Stephen Jolly (Independent Socialist), Bridgid O'Brien (Independent Socialist) and Michael Glynatis (Independent) in 2020.)	▲0.07
	Third party	Fourth party
	IND
Leader	N/A	N/A
Party	Independents	Labor
Last election	2 seats	0 seats
Seats before	4	0
Seats won	2	1
Seat change	▼2	▲1
Primary vote	12,685	3,491
Percentage	25.75%	7.08%
Swing	▲3.03	▼7.23
- 2024 ward boundaries. Expand the map and click on a ward to see the ward name
Largest party before election
No overall control
Subsequent largest party
Yarra For All

Yarra City Council is composed of nine single-member wards. Prior to the 2024 election, it was composed of three multi-member wards with three members each, but the electoral structure changed as a result of the Local Government Act 2020.

After winning a majority at the 2020 election with five seats, the Greens were left with only two seats ahead of the 2024 election. Amanda Stone and Anab Mohamud resigned from the party in 2023 and 2024 respectively, while Gabrielle De Vietri was elected to the Parliament of Victoria in 2022 and replaced by Michael Glynatis via countback.

In early 2024, Independent Socialist councillor Stephen Jolly formed Yarra For All (YFA) alongside fellow councillors Michael Glynatis and Bridgid O'Brien. A total of 11 YFA candidates contested the elections, with four of those elected.

The Labor Party endorsed three candidates, while the Victorian Socialists endorsed eight.

=== Yarra results ===
2024 Victorian local elections: Yarra
Party	Votes	%	Swing	Seats	Change
Yarra For All	16,157	32.80	+15.85	4	▲2
Greens	13,108	26.61	+0.07	2	▼3
Independents	12,685	25.75	−3.03	2	Steady
Victorian Socialists	3,814	7.74	+7.74	0	Steady
Labor	3,491	7.08	−7.23	1	▲1
Formal votes	49,255	97.90	+3.09		
Informal votes	1,058	2.10	−3.09		
Total	50,313	100.0			
Registered voters / turnout	68,723	73.21	+3.07		

=== Boulevard ===
2024 Victorian local elections: Boulevard Ward
Party	Candidate	Votes	%	±%
Yarra For All	Sharon Harrison	1,725	32.53	+32.53
Independent	Sarah McRitchie	987	18.62	+18.62
Greens	Oscar North	963	18.16	+18.16
Independent	Campbell Watkins	736	13.88	+13.88
Labor	Ned Lindenmayer	506	9.54	+9.54
Victorian Socialists	Annie Toller	385	7.26	+7.26
Total formal votes		5,302	97.59	
Informal votes		131	2.41	
Turnout		5,433	74.64	
Two-candidate-preferred result
Yarra For All	Sharon Harrison	3,071	57.92	+57.92
Independent	Sarah McRitchie	2,231	42.08	+42.08
Yarra For All win		(new ward)		

=== Curtain ===
2024 Victorian local elections: Curtain Ward
Party	Candidate	Votes	%	±%
Greens	Edward Crossland	2,102	35.28	
Yarra For All	Alan Tse	1,478	24.80	
Yarra For All	Peter Sprott	1,049	17.60	
Independent	Anna Spark	665	11.16	
Victorian Socialists	Bronwyn Murphy	664	11.14	
Total formal votes		5,958	98.23	
Informal votes		107	1.77	
Turnout		6,065	72.81	
Two-candidate-preferred result
Greens	Edward Crossland	3,255	54.63	
Yarra For All	Alan Tse	2,703	45.37	
Greens win		(new ward)		

=== Hoddle ===
2024 Victorian local elections: Hoddle Ward
Party	Candidate	Votes	%	±%
Greens	Sophie Wade	1,613	35.73	
Yarra For All	Brielle Pope	853	18.90	
Independent	Tony Lee	813	18.01	
Yarra For All	Michael Glynatis	561	12.43	
Independent	Sharie Harrold	367	8.13	
Victorian Socialists	Holly Cruickshank Medlyn	287	6.36	
Independent	S. Geminder	20	0.44	
Total formal votes		4,514	97.60	
Informal votes		111	2.40	
Turnout		4,625	66.68	
Two-candidate-preferred result
Greens	Sophie Wade	2,450	54.28	
Yarra For All	Brielle Pope	2,064	45.72	
Greens win		(new ward)		

=== Langridge ===
2024 Victorian local elections: Langridge Ward
Party	Candidate	Votes	%	±%
Yarra For All	Evangeline Aston	2,112	40.44	
Greens	Harrison Watt	1,643	31.46	
Independent	Ha Tran	754	14.44	
Victorian Socialists	Angus Fretwell	713	13.65	
Total formal votes		5,222	98.42	
Informal votes		84	1.58	
Turnout		5,305	72.68	
Two-candidate-preferred result
Yarra For All	Evangeline Aston	2,899	55.52	
Greens	Harrison Watt	2,323	44.48	
Yarra For All win		Swing	N/A	

=== Lennox ===
2024 Victorian local elections: Lennox Ward
Party	Candidate	Votes	%	±%
Independent	Andrew Davies	1,718	29.58	
Greens	Sam Poustie	1,261	21.72	
Independent	Peter Razos	1,037	17.86	
Independent	John Bric	655	11.28	
Yarra For All	Theresa Saldanha	653	11.25	
Independent	Vicki Redwood	192	3.31	
Total formal votes		5,807	97.98	
Informal votes		120	2.02	
Turnout		5,927	75.01	
Two-candidate-preferred result
Independent	Andrew Davies	4,006	68.99	
Greens	Sam Poustie	1,801	31.01	
Independent win		(new ward)		

=== MacKillop ===
2024 Victorian local elections: MacKillop Ward
Party	Candidate	Votes	%	±%
Yarra For All	Stephen Jolly	2,757	51.35	
Greens	Charlotte George	1,565	29.15	
Independent	Renee Smith	550	10.24	
Victorian Socialists	Belle Gibson	497	9.26	
Total formal votes		5,369	98.05	
Informal votes		107	1.95	
Turnout		5,476	68.60	
Yarra For All win		(new ward)		

=== Melba ===
2024 Victorian local elections: Melba Ward
Party	Candidate	Votes	%	±%
Independent	Meca Ho	1,151	22.00	
Greens	Karen Hovenga	1,092	20.88	
Labor	Sarah Witty	1,068	20.42	
Yarra For All	Victoria Chipperfield	725	13.86	
Independent	Katarina Radonic	489	9.35	
Independent	Mubarek Imam	439	8.39	
Victorian Socialists	Stella Heffernan	267	5.10	
Independent	Christine Maynard (ineligible) (Note: Candidate was ineligible to contest the election after not completing mandatory candidate training. They still appeared on the ballot as they were only "retired" by the Victorian Electoral Commission after ballot papers had been printed, however they could not serve as a councillor and their votes were distributed to other candidates according to voters' preferences.)	N/A	N/A	
Total formal votes		5,231	97.10	
Informal votes		156	2.90	
Turnout		5,387	72.61	
Two-candidate-preferred result
Independent	Meca Ho	2,780	53.14	
Labor	Sarah Witty	2,451	46.86	
Independent win		Swing	N/A	

=== Nicholls ===
2024 Victorian local elections: Nicholls Ward
Party	Candidate	Votes	%	±%
Yarra For All	Kenneth Gomez	2,284	39.24	
Greens	Thibaut Clamart	1,466	25.19	
Independent	Catherine Noone	1,423	24.45	
Victorian Socialists	Samuel Eggleston	393	6.75	
Independent	Remy Larocca	254	4.36	
Total formal votes		5,820	98.39	
Informal votes		95	1.61	
Turnout		5,915	76.52	
Two-candidate-preferred result
Yarra For All	Kenneth Gomez	3,636	62.47	
Greens	Thibaut Clamart	2,184	37.53	
Yarra For All win		Swing	N/A	

=== Yarra Bend ===
2024 Victorian local elections: Yarra Bend Ward
Party	Candidate	Votes	%	±%
Yarra For All	Bridgid O'Brien	1,960	32.49	
Labor	Sarah McKenzie	1,917	31.78	
Greens	Jill Post	1,403	23.26	
Victorian Socialists	Amaya Castro Williams	608	10.08	
Independent	Leonie Gnieslaw	144	2.39	
Total formal votes		6,032	97.62	
Informal votes		147	2.38	
Turnout		6,179	78.75	
Two-candidate-preferred result
Labor	Sarah McKenzie	3,113	51.61	
Yarra For All	Bridgid O'Brien	2,919	48.39	
Labor win		(new ward)		

== See also ==
- Results of the 2024 Victorian local elections in Eastern Melbourne
- Results of the 2024 Victorian local elections in Northern Melbourne
- Results of the 2024 Victorian local elections in South-Eastern Melbourne
- Results of the 2024 Victorian local elections in Western Melbourne
