= Results of the 2020 Victorian local elections in Inner Melbourne =

2020 Victorian local elections (Inner Melbourne)
- 24 October 2020

This is a list of results for the 2020 Victorian local elections in the Inner Melbourne region.

Inner Melbourne covers three local government areas (LGAs) − Melbourne City Council, Port Phillip City Council, and Yarra City Council.

== Melbourne ==
=== Leadership Team ===
2020 Victorian local elections: Melbourne (Leadership Team)
Party	Candidate	Votes	%	±%
Team Sally Capp	Sally Capp; Nicholas Reece	27,949	31.60	+6.22
Greens	Apsara Sabaratnam; Roxane Ingleton	14,753	16.68	−4.59
Team Arron Wood	Arron Wood; Lisa Teh	13,497	15.26	+15.26
Bring Back Melbourne	Nick Russian; Michael Burge	8,975	10.15	+10.15
Labor	Phil Reed; Wesa Chau	8,355	9.45	+9.45
Back To Business	Jennifer Yang; Sandra Gee	8,219	9.29	+9.29
Victorian Socialists	Kath Larkin; Daniel Nair Dadich	2,911	3.29	+3.29
Morgan-Watts Team	Gary Morgan; Mary-Lou Howie	2,446	2.77	−4.02
Team Zorin	Wayne Tseng; Gricol Yang	1,329	1.50	+1.50
Total formal votes		88,434	96.62	+0.22
Informal votes		3,096	3.38	−0.22
Two-candidate-preferred result
Team Sally Capp	Sally Capp; Nicholas Reece	47,256	53.44	+0.39
Team Arron Wood	Arron Wood; Lisa Teh	41,178	46.56	+46.56
Team Sally Capp hold		Swing	N/A	

=== Councillors ===
2020 Victorian local elections: Melbourne (councillors)
Party	Candidate	Votes	%	±%
Team Sally Capp	1. Kevin Louey (elected 1); 2. Roshena Campbell (elected 5); 3. Mark David McMillan; 4. Tania Davidge; 5. James Young; 6. Tina Kuek	24,395	26.73	+26.73
Greens	1. Rohan Leppert (elected 2); 2. Olivia Ball (elected 6); 3. Emily Corcoran; 4. David Jeffery; 5. Nakita Thomson; 6. Charlotte George	14,602	16.00	−4.16
Team Arron Wood	1. Jason Chang (elected 3); 2. Peter Clarke; 3. Beverley Frances Pinder; 4. Abdirahman I. Ali; 5. Beverley Honig	12,187	13.35	+13.35
Labor	1. Davydd Griffiths (elected 4); 2. Mary Delahunty; 3. Hamdi Ali	10,626	11.64	+11.64
Bring Back Melbourne	1. Philip Le Liu (elected 7); 2. Serena Lu Jiang; 3. Lauren Sherson; 4. Darin Schade	6,683	7.32	−1.77
Back To Business	1. Elizabeth Mary Doidge (elected 9); 2. Charles Pick; 3. Moti Visa; 4. Bedri Sainovski	6,572	7.18	+7.18
Liberal Democrats	1. Paul Silverberg; 2. Faith Newman	5,064	5.55	+5.55
Morgan-Watts Team	1. Jackie Watts; 2. Michael Kennedy; 3. Haya Aldaghlas; 4. Dashi Zhang	1,541	1.69	−3.22
Victorian Socialists	1. Christopher di Pasquale; 2. Jesse Lambourn	1,441	1.58	+1.58
Sustainable Australia	1. Richard Belcher; 2. Bettina Terry	1,361	1.49	+1.49
Animal Justice	1. Rabin Bangaar; 2. Rod Whitfield	1,251	1.37	−1.07
Residents First	1. Janette Corcoran; 2. Mary Masters; 3. Samantha Tran	1,110	1.21	+1.21
Innovate Melbourne	1. Andrew Rowse; 2. John Daniell	817	0.89	+0.89
Team Hakim	1. Jamal Hakim (elected 8); 2. Safaa Hakim	379	0.41	+0.41
Melbourne - We All Matter	1. Sainab Sheikh; 2. Fatuma Ali	374	0.41	+0.41
Artemis Pattichi - Independent Local Voice	1. Artemis Pattichi; 2. Adriana Mendieta Nino	351	0.38	+0.38
Ungrouped	Scott Robson; Luke Downing; Philip Jonathan Bateman; Andrew Ward	332	0.36	+0.10
Your Melbourne Team Get It Done	1. Mary Poulakis; 2. Fiona Sweetman	291	0.32	+0.32
It Will Be Okay Melbourne	1. Joseph Burke; 2. Michael Mach	203	0.22	+0.22
Total formal votes		88,434	96.62	−1.42
Informal votes		1,686	3.38	+1.42
Turnout		91,531	66.73	+11.54

== Port Phillip ==
2020 Port Phillip City Council election
- 24 October 2020

All 9 seats on Port Phillip City Council 5 seats needed for a majority
- Registered: 88,268
- Turnout: 65.73% (▲17.13)

	First party	Second party
Party	Labor	Greens
Last election	2 seats	2 seats
Seats before	2	2
Seats won	2	2
Seat change	Steady	Steady
Primary vote	13,228	11,881
Percentage	23.72%	21.31%
	Third party	Fourth party
	IND	RoPP
Party	Ind. Liberal	Ratepayers
Last election	2 seats	Did not exist
Seats before	2	0
Seats won	2	2
Seat change	Steady	▲2
Primary vote	11,353	8,279
Percentage	20.36%	14.85%
Largest party before election
No overall control
Subsequent largest party
No overall control

Port Phillip City Council is composed of three multi-member wards, each electing three councillors.

=== Port Phillip results ===
2020 Victorian local elections: Port Phillip
Party	Votes	%	Swing	Seats	Change
Labor	13,228	23.72		2	Steady
Greens	11,881	21.31		2	Steady
Independent Liberal	11,353	20.36		2	Steady
Ratepayers of Port Phillip	8,279	14.85	+14.85	2	▲2
Independent	8,068	14.47		1	Steady
Sustainable Australia	1,559	2.79		0	Steady
Ind. Ratepayers of Port Phillip	482	0.86	+0.86	0	Steady
Formal votes	55,752	96.09	+4.12		
Informal votes	2,269	3.91	−4.12		
Total	58,021	100.0			
Registered voters / turnout	88,268	65.73	+17.13		

=== Canal ===
2020 Victorian local elections: Canal Ward
Party	Candidate	Votes	%	±%
Labor	Louise Crawford (elected 1)	4,637	23.30	+10.54
Labor	Dick Gross	3,001	15.08	+0.09
Greens	Tim Baxter (elected 3)	2,733	13.73	−12.14
Ratepayers of Port Phillip	Rhonda Clark (Note: Also a Liberal Party member.) (elected 2)	2,144	10.77	+10.77
Independent Liberal	Jo McDonald	1,834	9.22	+9.22
Independent Liberal	Warwick Cahir	1,527	7.67	+7.67
Greens	Maddy Blay	1,444	7.26	+7.26
Independent	Lesley G. Pianella	1,023	5.14	+5.14
Sustainable Australia	Dennis Bilic	798	4.01	+4.01
Sustainable Australia	Steven Armstrong	761	3.82	+0.02
Total formal votes		19,902	95.67	
Informal votes		901	4.33	
Turnout		20,803	69.85	

=== Gateway ===
2020 Victorian local elections: Gateway Ward
Party	Candidate	Votes	%	±%
Independent Liberal	Marcus Pearl (elected 1)	4,134	21.81	+1.07
Independent	Heather Cunsolo (elected 2)	3,858	20.36	+20.36
Labor	Peter Martin (elected 3)	2,716	14.33	+14.33
Ratepayers of Port Phillip	Sami Maher	2,442	12.89	+12.89
Greens	Earl James	2,285	12.06	+9.73
Independent	Stan Gyles	1,219	6.43	+6.43
Independent	Trina Lewis	1,168	6.16	+6.16
Independent	Cleo Papageorgiou	1,130	5.96	+5.96
Total formal votes		18,952	96.52	
Informal votes		684	3.48	
Turnout		19,636	69.98	

=== Lake ===
2020 Victorian local elections: Lake Ward
Party	Candidate	Votes	%	±%
Greens	Katherine Copsey	5,419	26.77	+0.18
Independent Liberal	Andrew Bond	3,858	20.36	+3.03
Ratepayers of Port Phillip	Christina Sirakoff	3,693	18.25	+18.25
Labor	Robbie Nyaguy	2,874	14.20	+14.20
Independent	Geoffrey Conaghan	1,436	7.09	+7.09
Independent	Bernard Mandile	1,322	6.53	+6.53
Independent	Roger Ward	770	3.80	+3.80
Ind. Ratepayers	Adrian Jackson	482	2.38	+2.38
Total formal votes		20,241	96.65	
Informal votes		702	3.35	
Turnout		20,943	68.83	

== Yarra ==
2020 Yarra City Council election
- 24 October 2020

All 9 seats on Yarra City Council 5 seats needed for a majority
- Registered: 78,795
- Turnout: 70.14% (▲18.99)

	First party	Second party
	IND
Party	Independents	Greens
Last election	2 seats	4 seats
Seats before	3	2
Seats won	2	5
Seat change	▼1	▲3
First preference vote	15,081	13,909
Percentage	28.78%	26.54%
	Third party	Fourth party
		IND
Party	Labor	Ind. Socialist
Last election	2 seats	0 seats
Seats before	2	2
Seats won	0	2
Seat change	▼2	Steady
First preference vote	7,501	7,380
Percentage	14.31%	14.08%
Largest party before election
Independents
Subsequent largest party
Greens

Yarra City Council is composed of three multi-member wards, each electing three councillors.

All five Greens candidates were elected, giving the party a majority − the first time the party had won a majority on any council in Victoria. Two independents and two Independent Socialist candidates were also elected.

The Labor Party endorsed five candidates, including Rowan Payne, who replaced Alicia Carr as one of two candidates in Langridge Ward after she withdrew for family reasons. However, they were unable to win any seats, marking the first time since the council's first election in 1996 that Labor had been without elected representation in Yarra.

The Reason Party endorsed three candidates, while the Liberal Democratic Party and Animal Justice Party had one candidate each. A local group, Richmond First, had two candidates in Melba Ward.

=== Yarra results ===
2020 Victorian local elections: Yarra
Party	Votes	%	Swing	Seats	Change
Independent	15,081	28.78		2	Steady
Greens	13,909	26.54		5	▲1
Labor	7,501	14.31		0	▼2
Independent Socialist	7,380	14.08		2	▲2
Reason	2,609	4.99	+4.99	0	Steady
Independent Liberal	2,217	4.23	+4.23	0	Steady
Richmond First	1,897	3.62	+3.62	0	Steady
Liberal Democrats	1,282	2.45		0	Steady
Animal Justice	524	1.00		0	Steady
Formal votes	52,400	94.81	+2.86		
Informal votes	2,872	5.19	−2.86		
Total	55,272	100.0		9	
Registered voters / turnout	78,795	70.14	+18.99		

=== Langridge ===
2020 Victorian local elections: Langridge Ward
Party	Candidate	Votes	%	±%
Independent Socialist	Stephen Jolly (elected 1)	4,836	26.07	−4.99 (Note: Compared to results as a Socialists candidate at the 2016 election.)
Greens	Anab Mohamud (elected 2)	3,216	17.34	+17.34
Greens	Gabrielle de Vietri (elected 3)	2,206	11.89	+11.89
Labor	Karen Douglas	1,823	9.83	+9.83
Independent Liberal	James Bae	1,725	9.30	+9.30
Independent	Michael Glynatsis	1,503	8.10	+8.10
Reason	Jeremy Cowen	1,311	7.07	+7.07
Independent	Hai Tran	781	4.21	−3.28
Independent	Matoc Mordecai Achol	450	2.43	−4.11 (Note: Compared to results as a Greens candidate at the 2016 election.)
Independent	Peter Hude	432	2.33	+2.33
Labor	Rowan Payne	267	1.44	+1.44
Total formal votes		18,550	95.78	+4.14
Informal votes		817	4.22	−4.14
Turnout		19,367	68.96	+19.06

=== Melba ===
2020 Victorian local elections: Melba Ward
Party	Candidate	Votes	%	±%
Greens	Edward Crossland (elected 1)	2,866	16.82	−7.67
Independent	Claudia Nguyen (elected 2)	2,094	12.29	+12.29
Labor	Sandeep Sarathy	1,825	10.71	−8.44
Independent	Herschel Landes (elected 3)	1,437	8.43	−2.36
Liberal Democrats	Matthew Ford	1,282	7.52	+7.52
Independent	Meca Ho	1,207	7.08	+7.08
Independent	Sarah Witty	1,066	6.26	+6.26
Richmond First	Dora Tsipouras	968	5.68	+5.68
Richmond First	David Horseman	929	5.45	+5.45
Independent	Katarina Radonic	788	4.62	+4.62
Independent	Mitchell Price	562	3.30	+3.30
Labor	Julie Bignell	556	3.26	+3.26
Reason	Penelope Drummond	523	3.07	+3.07
Independent Liberal	Kate Drake	492	2.89	−1.02
Independent	Don Ash	444	2.61	+2.61
Total formal votes		17,039	93.30	+2.84
Informal votes		1,223	6.70	−2.84
Turnout		18,262	69.79	+18.78

=== Nicholls ===
2020 Victorian local elections: Nicholls Ward
Party	Candidate	Votes	%	±%
Greens	Amanda Stone (elected 3)	2,937	17.47	−5.82
Greens	Sophie Wade (elected 2)	2,684	15.97	−2.01
Independent Socialist	Bridgid O'Brien (elected 1)	2,544	15.13	+10.22
Labor	Annabelle Wilson	1,958	11.65	+11.65
Independent	Gerald Fisher	1,545	9.19	+9.19
Independent	Sasha Beitner	1,356	8.07	+8.07
Labor	Debra Thorpe	1,072	6.38	+6.38
Independent	Catherine Noone	944	5.62	+5.62
Reason	Guy Ewan Barker	775	4.61	+4.61
Animal Justice	Amber Anderson	524	3.12	+3.12
Independent	Em Sage	472	2.81	+2.81
Total formal votes		16,811	95.28	+1.49
Informal votes		832	4.72	−1.49
Turnout		17,643	71.89	+19.21
