= James Campbell (journalist) =

Australian journalist (21st century)

- Education: Melbourne Grammar School
- Occupation: Journalist
- Spouse: Roshena Campbell

James Campbell is the national politics editor at the Herald Sun newspaper in Melbourne and a regular commentator on Sky News Australia. He has also written for The Age, The Times newspaper in London, The Punch website, The Spectator and the Institute of Public Affairs Review. He also reported for the BBC on the 2013 Australian federal election.

== Early life and career ==
He attended Melbourne Grammar School. In the 1980s, he also appeared as an extra in Australian television series Neighbours and alongside Dame Joan Sutherland in an Australian production of the opera Lucia di Lammermoor.

Prior to becoming a journalist, Campbell worked as a Liberal staffer, advising Helen Shardey, the Victorian Shadow Minister for Health at the time.

== Career ==
In 2010, Campbell won the Grant Hattam Quill Award for Investigative Journalism in any Medium from the Melbourne Press Club for a story about the conduct of the Victorian Director of Public Prosecutions Jeremy Rapke that led to his resignation.

In 2013, he became the Herald Sun and Sunday Herald Sun's political editor and broke a story based on secret tapes discussing highly sensitive political matters that he says led to the sudden resignation of Victorian Premier Ted Baillieu. Campbell subsequently won the 2013 Monash University Gold Quill and the Walkley Foundation's 2013 "Scoop of the Year" for the story.

== Personal life ==
Campbell is married to Roshena Campbell, a City of Melbourne councilor and former Liberal parliamentary candidate.
