= City of Melbourne =

Local government area in Victoria, Australia

- Local government area
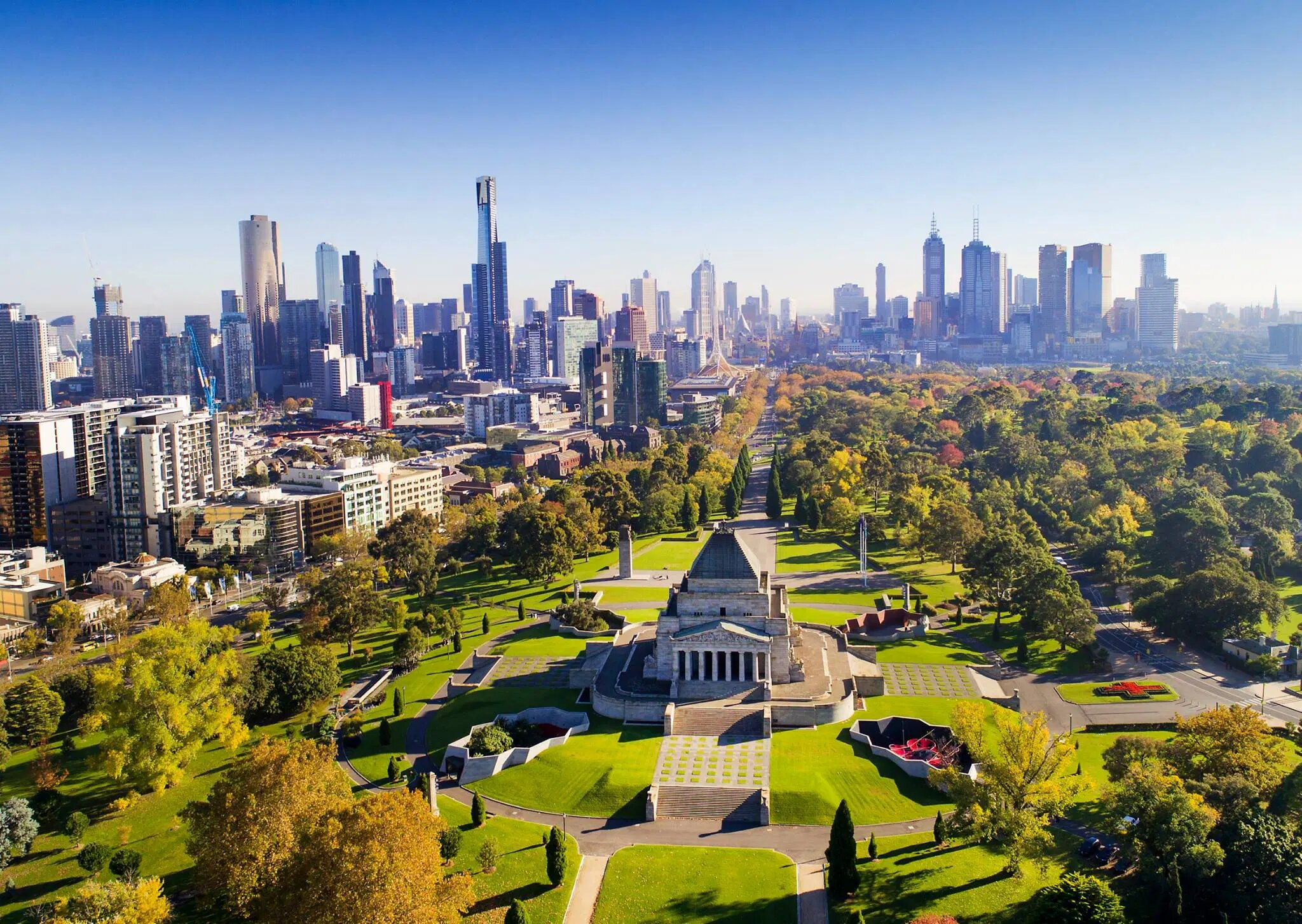
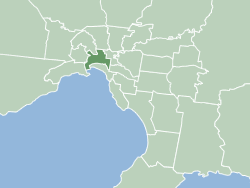
- Aerial view of the Melbourne skyline from Kings Domain, May 2020 Location in Greater Melbourne

- Interactive map of City of Melbourne
- Coordinates: 37°48′49″S 144°57′47″E
- Country: Australia
- State: Victoria
- Region: Greater Melbourne
- City: Melbourne
- Established: 12 August 1842
- Council seat: Melbourne CBD (Town Hall)

Government
  - Lord Mayor: Nicholas Reece
  - State electorates: Albert Park; Brunswick; Essendon; Melbourne; Prahran
  - Federal divisions: Macnamara; Maribyrnong; Melbourne; Wills

Area
  - Total: 37.7 km^{2} (14.6 sq mi)

Population
  - Total: 149,615 (2021 census)
  - Density: 3,969/km^{2} (10,279/sq mi)
- Time zone: UTC+10 (AEST)
  - Summer (DST): UTC+11 (AEDT)
- County: Bourke
- Website: City of Melbourne
LGAs around City of Melbourne
Moonee Valley	Merri-bek	Darebin
Maribyrnong	City of Melbourne	Yarra
Hobsons Bay	Port Phillip	Stonnington

The city flag of Melbourne.

The Melbourne City coat of arms

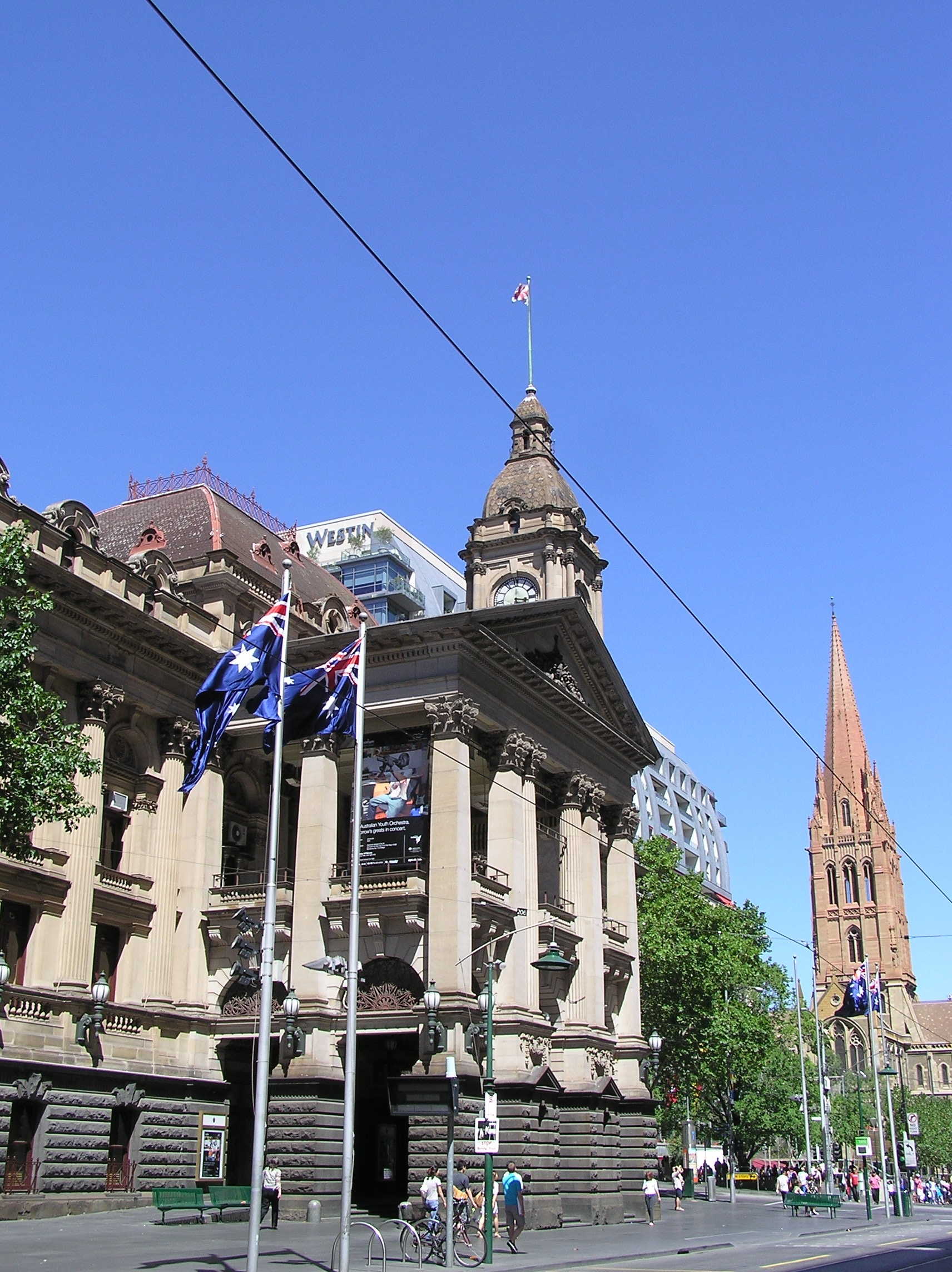
Melbourne Town Hall on Swanston Street built 1870–1887

The City of Melbourne is a local government area in Victoria, Australia, which constitutes the inner city area of Melbourne. In 2021, the city had an area of 37.7 square kilometres (14.6 sq mi) and a population of 149,615. The city's motto is "vires acquirit eundo" which means "we gather strength as we go".

The current Lord Mayor is Nicholas Reece, who replaced Sally Capp on 2 July 2024. The Melbourne City Council (MCC) is the city’s local governing authority and is based out of Melbourne Town Hall.

== History ==
=== 19th century ===
Melbourne was founded in 1835, during the reign of King William IV, following the arrival of the schooner Enterprize near the present site of the Queen's Wharf. Unlike other Australian capital cities, Melbourne did not originate under official auspices, instead owing its origins to non-indigenous settlers from Tasmania.

Having been a province of New South Wales from its establishment in 1835, affairs of the settlement had been administered by the Parliament of New South Wales. With the growth of the settlement there had been an increasing demand by the inhabitants for greater autonomy over their own affairs. On 12 August 1842, Melbourne was incorporated as a town by Act 6 Victoria No. 7 (NSW) of the Governor and Legislative Council of New South Wales.

The town of Melbourne was raised to the status of a city by Letters Patent of Queen Victoria dated 25 June 1847, five years after its incorporation as a town. The Letters Patent also constituted the Anglican Diocese of Melbourne and declared Melbourne a cathedral city. A motion was tabled at a meeting of the Town Council to alter the style and title of Melbourne from a town to a city, a draft bill was approved and transmitted to the Government for introduction to the Legislature. On 3 August 1849, Act 13 Victoria No. 14 (NSW) was finally assented to as "An Act to effect a change in the Style and Title of the Corporation of Melbourne rendered necessary by the erection of the Town of Melbourne to a City".

The city's initial boundaries, as set down in Act 8 Victoria No. 12 (NSW) (19 December 1844) extended from Point Ormond in Elwood up Barkly Street and Punt Road to the Yarra River, along the river to Merri Creek at Abbotsford, then west along Brunswick Road to Moonee Ponds Creek, then south past Flemington Bridge to Princes Pier in Port Melbourne. The Act imposed on the Mayor a duty to set up "permanent and conspicuous boundary marks of iron, wood, stone or other durable material" along or near the line of the Town's boundaries—this was undertaken by Mayor James Frederick Palmer and Town Clerk John Charles King on 4 February 1846.

During the 1850s, Collingwood, Fitzroy and Richmond seceded from Melbourne (all are, since 1994, part of the City of Yarra), as did South Melbourne, whilst other parts became parts of the neighbouring districts of St Kilda and Port Melbourne, and the border between Brunswick and Melbourne moved south one block to Park Street.

=== 20th century ===
On 18 December 1902, King Edward VII conferred the title "Lord Mayor" on the mayor of the City of Melbourne.

On 30 October 1905, Melbourne absorbed two neighbouring council areas. Now included in the city was the Borough of Flemington and Kensington, which had been formed in 1882 when it broke away from the City of Essendon. The second, the Town of North Melbourne, formerly known as Hotham, had been established on 30 September 1859 and been granted town status on 18 December 1874. Both town halls are still in use today as public buildings—the former in Kensington near the present-day Newmarket railway station; the latter in Errol Street, North Melbourne.

The Melbourne and Geelong Corporations Act 1938 allowed for three councillors for each of the eleven wards, with a general election held on 24 August 1939.

The first woman in 125 years to be elected to the council was local businessperson Clare J. Cascarret in 1967. The election was said to have cost her over half a million pounds.

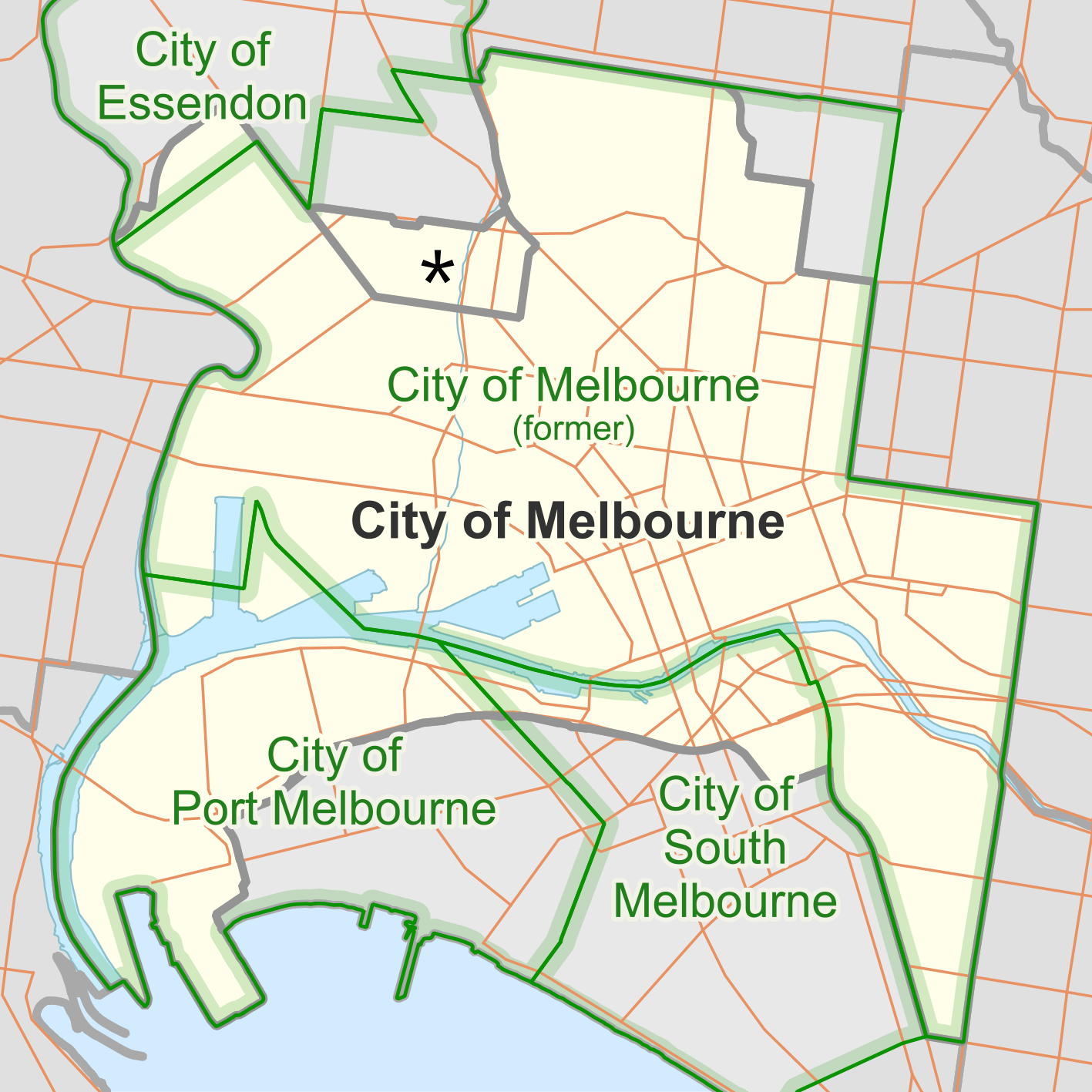
The City of Melbourne's boundaries before (green) and after (yellow) the 1993 changes 🞲 Area transferred from the City of Moonee Valley in 2008

Following a recommendation by the Local Government Advisory Board in 1978, an Order in Council (27 February 1979, effective from 19 May 1979) reduced the wards from eleven to eight. In December 1980, the Hamer Government dismissed the council, and appointed three Commissioners to determine how the boundaries could best be altered to produce more effective local government, with special regard to Melbourne's central business district and its importance to the state, as well as to advise changes needed to the constitution, structure, functions and administration. However, in 1982, with the election of a new Labor government under John Cain, the act establishing the commission was repealed, and the Melbourne Corporation (Election of Council) Act 1982 (No. 9763) established six wards, for which an election was held on 4 December 1982. Three years later, an additional ward was added.

The City of Melbourne Act 1993 (No. 98 of 1993) specified new boundaries which saw Melbourne gain Southbank and the Port of Melbourne and lose Carlton North, Flemington and other residential areas; these changes took effect on 18 November 1993. At this time, the city was resubdivided into four wards (Flagstaff, University, Hoddle and Domain), but the ward system was abolished in 2001, with the council having a directly elected Lord Mayor and Deputy Lord Mayor, and seven other councillors. In 2012, the number of Councillors was increased to nine, in addition to the Lord Mayor and Deputy Lord Mayor.

In 1999, local government control of the docks area on the west side of the city was given to the Victorian Government's Docklands Authority.

=== 21st century ===
In 2005, the council announced the construction of a new 6-star environmental office building, Council House 2, in Little Collins Street.

On 2 July 2007, the suburb of Docklands was re-added to the City's jurisdiction.

On 1 July 2008, a section of Kensington and North Melbourne was transferred to the City of Melbourne from the City of Moonee Valley.

In July 2009, Lord Mayor Robert Doyle unveiled a new corporate identity for the City of Melbourne, costing $239,558.

Building on the council's longstanding interest in environmental issues, on 16 July 2019, the council voted to declare a climate and biodiversity emergency in line with similar declarations made elsewhere.

Following the death of Her Majesty Queen Elizabeth II, the City of Melbourne caused controversy and breached protocol, by failing to lower the Aboriginal and Torres Strait Islander flags to half mast, whilst the Australian flag was lowered in mourning.

== Council ==
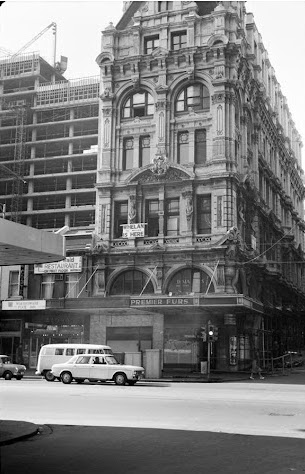
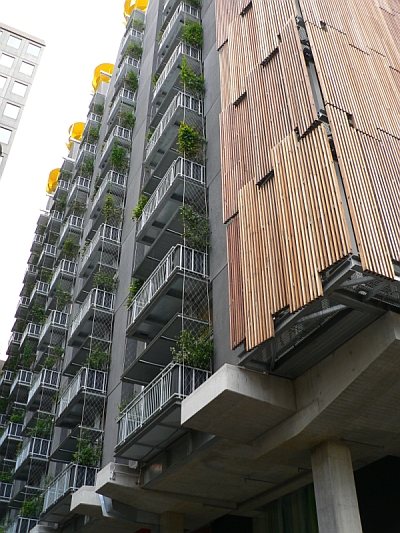
Town Hall Chambers (left) in 1968, just before its demolition and in the same location: Council House 2, Little Collins Street (right), completed 2006, the world's first 6 star green rating building; it features a louvred façade, natural and recycled materials, solar panels and thermal mass cooling.

The City of Melbourne is an unsubdivided municipality, consisting of a directly elected Lord Mayor and Deputy Lord Mayor, and nine Councillors. Since 2008, all Victorian councillors serve a four-year term. The most recent general election was held on Saturday 26th October 2024, the next election will take place in October 2028.

During a general election, the City of Melbourne holds two simultaneous elections – one to elect the Lord Mayor and Deputy Lord Mayor (leadership team) and the other to elect the nine councillors. All residents are entitled to vote in the election, as well as up to two of each of the following: non-residential owners and occupiers of rateable property. If a corporation solely owns or occupies rateable property in the municipality, then the corporation must appoint two company officers (director and/or company secretary, or equivalent) to represent it and vote on its behalf.

=== Current composition ===
The current makeup of the Council is:

Party	Councillors
Team Nick Reece	4
Greens	1
Democrats	1
Labor	1
Liberal	1
Team Kouta	1
Team Morgan	1
Team Wood	1
Total	11

Party	Councillor	Notes
Team Nick Reece	Nick Reece	Mayor
Team Nick Reece	Roshena Campbell	Deputy Mayor
Team Nick Reece	Kevin Louey	
Liberal	Owen Guest	
Greens	Olivia Ball	
Team Kouta	Gladys Liu	
Team Wood	Philip Le Liu	
Team Nick Reece	Mark Scott	
Team Morgan	Rafael Camillo	
Democrats	Andrew Rowse	Elected under Innovate Melbourne in 2024.
Labor	Davydd Griffiths	

== Election results ==
=== 2024 ===
2024 Victorian local elections: Melbourne (councillors)
Party	Candidate	Votes	%	±%
Team Nick Reece	1. Kevin Louey (elected 1); 2. Mark Scott (elected 6); 3. Lisa Teh; 4. Jannine Pattison; 5. Hamdi Ali; 6. Suzanne Stanley; 7. Simone Hartley-Keane	18,558	20.71	–6.02 (Note: Compared with Team Sally Capp at the 2020 election.)
Liberal	1. Owen Guest (elected 2); 2. You Li Liston	12,841	14.33	+14.33
Greens	1. Olivia Ball (elected 3); 2. Aaron Moon; 3. Barry Berih	12,692	14.16	–1.84
Team Kouta	1. Gladys Liu (elected 4); 2. Zaim Ramani; 3. Emma Elizabeth Carney; 4. Olivia Tjandramulia	10,588	11.82	+11.82
Team Wood	1. Philip Le Liu (elected 5); 2. Cathy Oke; 3. Nicolas Paul Zervos; 4. Hala Nur; 5. Michael-Lee Caiafa; 6. Hope Lai Wei; 7. Steve Michelson	9,366	10.45	–2.90
Labor	1. Davydd Griffiths (elected 9); 2. Sainab Abdi Sheikh; 3. Michael Aleisi	6,494	7.25	–4.39
Team Morgan	1. Rafael Camillo (elected 7); 2. William Caldwell	3,654	4.08	+2.39
Rip Up the Bike Lanes!	1. Sandra Gee; 2. Pratap Singh	2,878	3.21	+3.21
Team Hakim	1. Michael Smith; 2. Lawrence Lam; 3. Judy Gao	2,813	3.14	+2.73
Voices for Melbourne	1. Mary Masters; 2. James Vasilev-Robertson	2,689	3.00	+3.00
Animal Justice	1. Aashna Katyal; 2. Rabin Bangaar	1,688	1.88	+0.19
Innovate Melbourne	1. Andrew Rowse (elected 8); 2. Jesse Greenwood	1,547	1.73	+0.84
Your Voice Matters to Me	1. Krystle Mitchell (Note: Also a Libertarian Party member.); 2. Jayden Durbin	1,134	1.27	+1.27
Team Elvis Martin	1. Elvis Martin; 2. Sophy Galbally; 3. Mavi Mujral; 4. Jing Lin; 5. Paul James Moore; 6. Melissa Rymer; 7. James Cullen; 8. Carole Kenny-Sarasa	1,000	1.12	+1.12
Victorian Socialists	1. Daniel Nair Dadich; 2. Ben Fok	500	0.56	–1.02
Team Participate	1. Asako Saito; 2. Sam Janda	461	0.51	+0.51
Ungrouped	Ekaterina Send; Jake Land; Aishwarya Kansakar; Mohamed Yusuf; Callum John French	703	0.78	+0.42
Total formal votes		89,606	97.67	–0.48
Informal votes		2,139	2.33	+0.48
Turnout		91,745	67.21	+0.67

=== 2020 ===
2020 Victorian local elections: Melbourne (councillors)
Party	Candidate	Votes	%	±%
Team Sally Capp	1. Kevin Louey (elected 1); 2. Roshena Campbell (elected 5); 3. Mark David McMillan; 4. Tania Davidge; 5. James Young; 6. Tina Kuek	24,395	26.73	+26.73
Greens	1. Rohan Leppert (elected 2); 2. Olivia Ball (elected 6); 3. Emily Corcoran; 4. David Jeffery; 5. Nakita Thomson; 6. Charlotte George	14,602	16.00	−4.16
Team Arron Wood	1. Jason Chang (elected 3); 2. Peter Clarke; 3. Beverley Frances Pinder; 4. Abdirahman I. Ali; 5. Beverley Honig	12,187	13.35	+13.35
Labor	1. Davydd Griffiths (elected 4); 2. Mary Delahunty; 3. Hamdi Ali	10,626	11.64	+11.64
Bring Back Melbourne	1. Philip Le Liu (elected 7); 2. Serena Lu Jiang; 3. Lauren Sherson; 4. Darin Schade	6,683	7.32	−1.77
Back To Business	1. Elizabeth Mary Doidge (elected 9); 2. Charles Pick; 3. Moti Visa; 4. Bedri Sainovski	6,572	7.18	+7.18
Liberal Democrats	1. Paul Silverberg; 2. Faith Newman	5,064	5.55	+5.55
Morgan-Watts Team	1. Jackie Watts; 2. Michael Kennedy; 3. Haya Aldaghlas; 4. Dashi Zhang	1,541	1.69	−3.22
Victorian Socialists	1. Christopher di Pasquale; 2. Jesse Lambourn	1,441	1.58	+1.58
Sustainable Australia	1. Richard Belcher; 2. Bettina Terry	1,361	1.49	+1.49
Animal Justice	1. Rabin Bangaar; 2. Rod Whitfield	1,251	1.37	−1.07
Residents First	1. Janette Corcoran; 2. Mary Masters; 3. Samantha Tran	1,110	1.21	+1.21
Innovate Melbourne	1. Andrew Rowse; 2. John Daniell	817	0.89	+0.89
Team Hakim	1. Jamal Hakim (elected 8); 2. Safaa Hakim	379	0.41	+0.41
Melbourne - We All Matter	1. Sainab Sheikh; 2. Fatuma Ali	374	0.41	+0.41
Artemis Pattichi - Independent Local Voice	1. Artemis Pattichi; 2. Adriana Mendieta Nino	351	0.38	+0.38
Ungrouped	Scott Robson; Luke Downing; Philip Jonathan Bateman; Andrew Ward	332	0.36	+0.10
Your Melbourne Team Get It Done	1. Mary Poulakis; 2. Fiona Sweetman	291	0.32	+0.32
It Will Be Okay Melbourne	1. Joseph Burke; 2. Michael Mach	203	0.22	+0.22
Total formal votes		88,434	96.62	−1.42
Informal votes		1,686	3.38	+1.42
Turnout		91,531	66.73	+11.54

== Demographics ==
Selected historical census data for City of Melbourne local government area
Census year		2001	2006	2011	2016
Population	Estimated residents on census night	60,745	71,380	93,625	135,959
Population	LGA rank in terms of size within Victoria		30th	▲25th	▲18th
Population	% of Victoria population	1.32%	▲1.45%	▲1.75%	▲2.29%
Population	% of Australian population	0.32%	▲0.36%	▲0.44%	▲0.58%
Cultural and language diversity					
Ancestry, top responses	Chinese			17.1%	▲22.8%
Ancestry, top responses	English			16.8%	▼14.1%
Ancestry, top responses	Australian			12.7%	▼9.7%
Ancestry, top responses	Irish			7.3%	▼6.0%
Ancestry, top responses	Scottish			5.6%	▼4.5%
Language, top responses (other than English)	Mandarin	4.7%	▲8.1%	▲10.4%	▲18.7%
Language, top responses (other than English)	Cantonese	4.7%	▲5.6%	▼4.9%	▼3.9%
Language, top responses (other than English)	Indonesian	3.1%	3.1%	▼2.7%	▼2.2%
Language, top responses (other than English)	Italian	1.8%	▼1.4%		
Language, top responses (other than English)	Vietnamese	1.3%			
Language, top responses (other than English)	Korean		1.2%	▲1.4%	▲2.1%
Language, top responses (other than English)	Arabic			1.5%	
Language, top responses (other than English)	Spanish				1.7%
Religious affiliation					
Religious affiliation, top responses	No religion	21.1%	▲26.6%	▲33.8%	▲44.5%
Religious affiliation, top responses	Catholic	20.2%	▼18.6%	▼17.2%	▼12.9%
Religious affiliation, top responses	Anglican	11.9%	▼8.4%	▼6.5%	
Religious affiliation, top responses	Buddhism	6.2%	▲7.5%	▲7.6%	▼6.9%
Religious affiliation, top responses	Uniting	4.0%			
Religious affiliation, top responses	Islam		3.5%	▲4.5%	
Religious affiliation, top responses	Hinduism				4.0%
Median weekly incomes					
Personal income	Median weekly personal income		A$566	A$711	A$642
Personal income	% of Australian median income		121.5%	123.2%	97.0%
Family income	Median weekly family income		A$1627	A$1962	A$2062
Family income	% of Australian median income		138.9%	132.5%	118.9%
Household income	Median weekly household income		A$1081	A$1352	A$1354
Household income	% of Australian median income		105.3%	109.6%	94.2%
Dwelling structure					
Dwelling type	Separate house	5.6%	▼3.7%	▲5.1%	▼2.9%
Dwelling type	Semi-detached, terrace or townhouse	21.1%	16.6%▼	▲16.7%	▼12.7%
Dwelling type	Flat or apartment	70.4%	▲79.2%	▼77.9%	▲83.4%

== Townships and localities ==
The 2021 census, the city had a population of 149,615 up from 135,959 in the 2016 census

Population
Locality	2016	2021
Carlton	18,535	16,055
Carlton North^	6,300	6,177
Docklands	10,964	15,495
East Melbourne	4,964	4,896
Flemington^	7,719	7,025
Kensington	10,812	10,745
Melbourne CBD^	47,285	54,941
North Melbourne	14,940	14,953
Parkville^	7,409	7,074
Port Melbourne^	16,175	17,633
South Wharf	106	71
South Yarra^	25,147	25,028
Southbank^	18,709	22,631
West Melbourne	5,515	8,025

^ - Territory divided with another LGA

== Population of the urban area ==
Year	1954	1958	1961	1966	1971	1976	1981	1986	1991	1996	2001	2006	2011	2016	2021
Population	93,172	89,800*	76,810	75,709	75,830	65,167	59,100*	56,100*	38,504	45,253	60,745	71,380	93,625	135,959	149,615

* Estimates in 1958, 1983 and 1988 Victorian Year Books.

== Railway stations ==
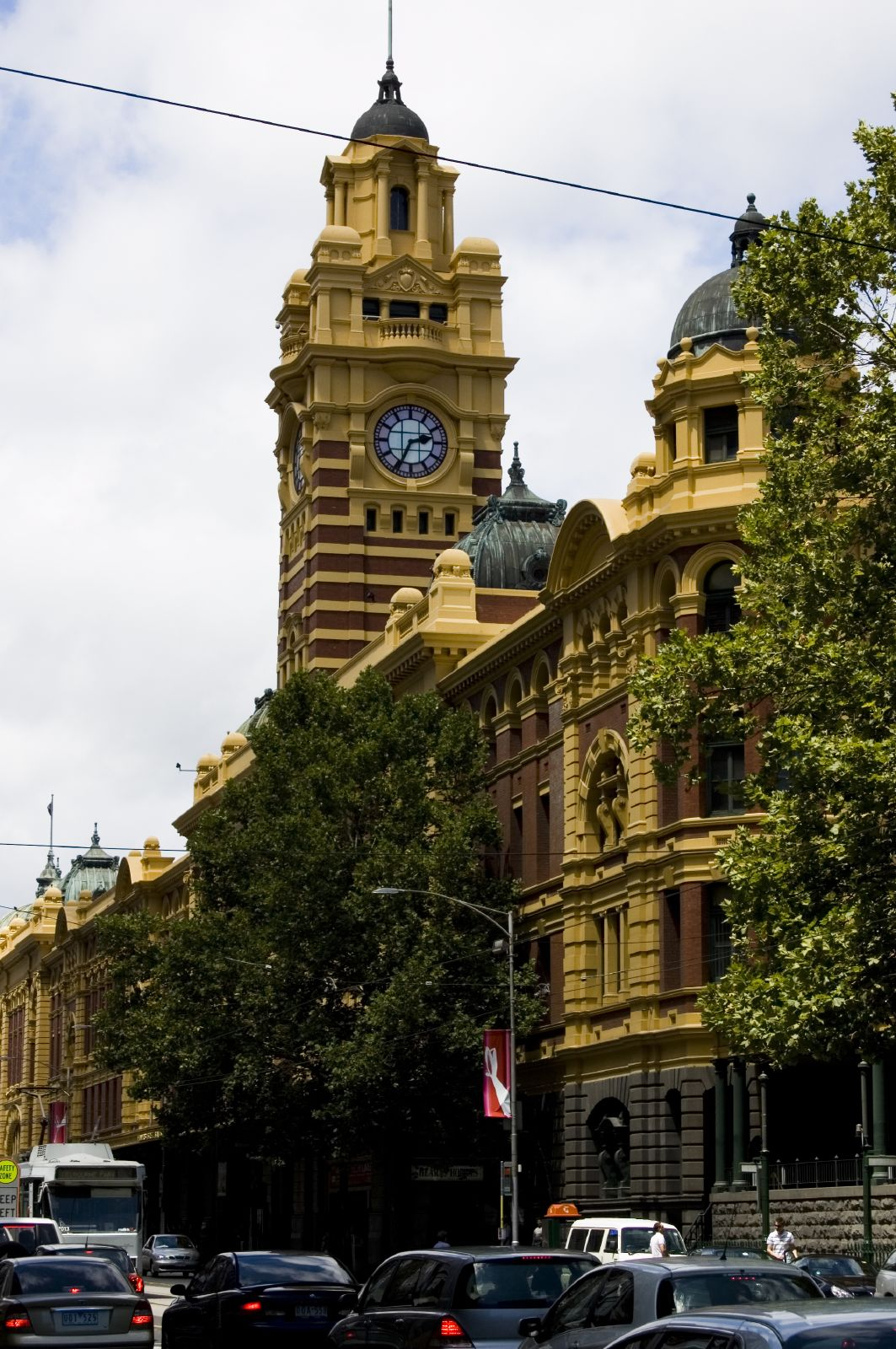
Flinders Street station

City Loop
Upfield, Cragieburn and Werribee, Williamstown Lines
- Flagstaff
- Flinders Street
- Melbourne Central
- Parliament
- Southern Cross

Other

- Royal Park
- Macaulay
- North Melbourne
- South Kensington
Mernda and Hurstbridge Lines

Jolimont

Flemington Racecourses Line

Showgrounds Flemington Racecourse

Metro Tunnel Lines

Arden Parkville State Library Town Hall Anzac

== Schools ==
=== Public ===
- University High School
- Victorian College for the Deaf
- Victorian College of the Arts Secondary School
- Carlton Primary School
- Carlton Gardens Primary School
- Docklands Primary School
- North Melbourne Primary School
- South Yarra Primary School

=== Private ===
- Christ Church Grammar School (Victoria, Primary)
- Eltham College – Year 9 City Campus
- Haileybury College - City Campus
- Melbourne Girls' Grammar School
- Melbourne Grammar School
- Tintern Grammar
- Wesley College – St Kilda Road Campuses

=== Catholic ===
- St Aloysius' College
- St Joseph's College
- Simonds Catholic College
- St Michaels Catholic Primary School

== Sister cities ==
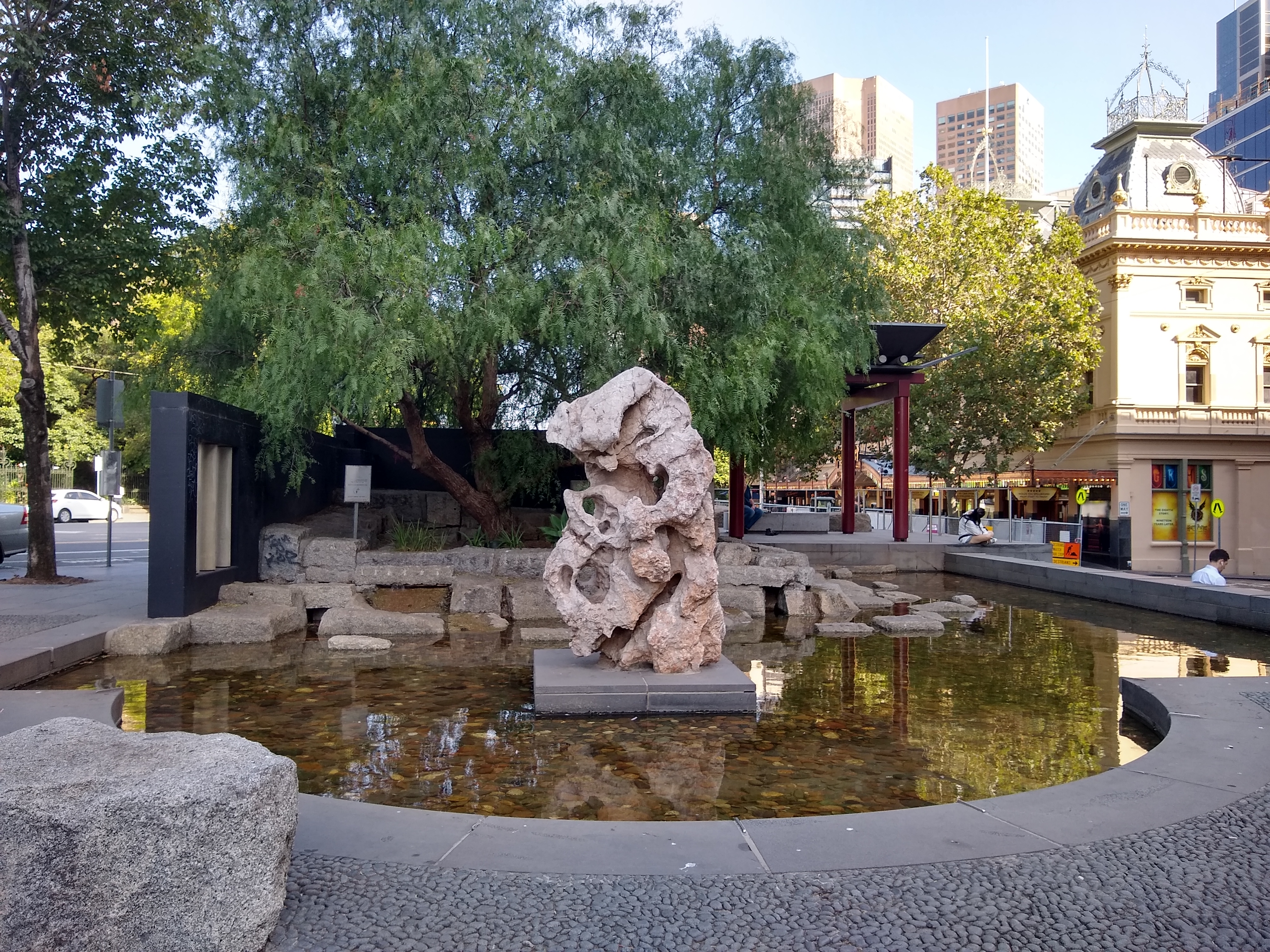
The Tianjin Garden on Spring Street serves as a symbol of Melbourne's close friendship with its sister city Tianjin.

The City of Melbourne has five sister cities:

- Osaka, Japan (established 1978)
- Tianjin, China (established 1980)
- Thessaloniki, Greece (established 1984)
- Boston, Massachusetts, United States (established 1985)
- Milan, Italy (established 2004)
- Chengdu, China (established 2026)

Between 1989 and 2022, the City of Melbourne had a sister city relationship with Saint Petersburg, Russia; this sister city relationship was indefinitely suspended on 1 March 2022, then terminated on 30 May 2023, as a result of the Russian invasion of Ukraine.

In addition to the sister cities, the City of Melbourne also cooperates with:

- New Delhi, India
- Bandung, Indonesia
- Chongqing, China
- Guangzhou, China
- Nanjing, China
- Suzhou, China
- Yokohama, Japan
- Vancouver, Canada
- Los Angeles, United States
- San Francisco, United States
- Seattle, United States
- Auckland, New Zealand
- Chicago, United States
- Ottawa, Canada
- Toronto, Canada
- Liverpool, United Kingdom
- Birmingham, United Kingdom
- San Diego, United States
- Shanghai, China
- Nagoya, Japan
- Kobe, Japan

== See also ==
- List of mayors and lord mayors of Melbourne
