= Carlton Gardens (disambiguation) =

Carlton Gardens may refer to:

- Carlton Gardens, a World Heritage Site in Melbourne, Australia
- Carlton Gardens Primary School, in Melbourne, Australia
- Carlton Gardens, a cul-de-sac at the west end of Carlton House Terrace, London, UK
