= Erin Deering =

Australian entrepreneur and fashion designer

- Occupations: Businesswoman; Entrepreneur
- Known for: Co-founder of Triangl

Erin Deering is an Australian entrepreneur and fashion designer.

== Triangl ==
Deering and her fiancé, Craig Ellis, co-founded Triangl, an online neoprene swimwear line, after moving to Hong Kong. "We launched the label in December 2012, after our second date at the beach, when I couldn't find a bikini to wear," she recalled. "We quickly decided, for pragmatic reasons, to rely exclusively on social media," Ellis admitted. In 2014, numerous celebrities, including the likes of Ellie Goulding, Kendall Jenner and Miley Cyrus, promoted Triangl via Instagram."Neither of [them] studied," she admitted, adding, though, that "both of [them] have worked in the industry for quite a few years." Deering made the 2015 BRW Young Rich List with a net worth of $36 million.

== 2024 Melbourne City Council election ==
Deering ran for deputy lord mayor at the 2024 Melbourne City Council election as Arron Wood's running mate.
