= Jeremy Rapke =

Australian lawyer

Jeremy Rapke is a lawyer who was the Director of Public Prosecutions (DPP) in Victoria from 2007 until his resignation in 2011 after an inquiry into his conduct in that office.

== Career ==
Jeremy Rapke served as Chief Crown Prosecutor in Victoria from 2005 and was appointed Director of Public Prosecutions on 7 November 2007, having acted in the role for several months.

In July 2010, Diana Karamicov was appointed to the position of associate crown prosecutor on the advice of Rapke. Gavin Silbert, the chief crown prosecutor, wrote to Rob Hulls, then the Attorney-General, stating concern that Rapke had not properly consulted with him and another solicitor at the Office of Public Prosecutions in regards to the appointment of Karamicov and two other simultaneous appointments. In October 2010, Rapke held a press conference in which he firmly denied that he had ever had a sexual relationship with Karamicov, following suggestions her appointment had not been based on merit, and praised her legal abilities. In advance of the 2010 Victorian state election, Victoria Legal Aid, the Law Institute of Victoria, and the Criminal Bar Association of Victoria issued a submission arguing that Rapke's advocacy for harsher sentencing brought the legal profession into disrepute.

Following the 2010 election, Attorney-General Robert Clark, from the newly elected Baillieu government, announced that an inquiry would occur into the operation of the offices of the DPP and crown prosecutors, to be headed by former Supreme Court justice Frank Vincent. The report was received by the Attorney-General in March 2011, and after Rapke reviewed the report himself, he resigned as Director of Public Prosecutions in May 2011. The Vincent report stated that Rapke had not engaged in "conscious wrongdoing", but that the three appointments "gave rise to the perception of the presence of a conflict of interest". The Vincent report made no findings on any relationship between Rapke and Karamicov, and did not conclude that the perception of a conflict of interest was either correct nor incorrect. The Vincent report was not publicly released, due to concerns over confidentiality, although both the Labor opposition and the Herald Sun newspaper called for the Attorney-General to release the report.
