= Nicholas Reece =

Australian politician and policy activist

The Right Honourable Lord Mayor Nicholas Reece
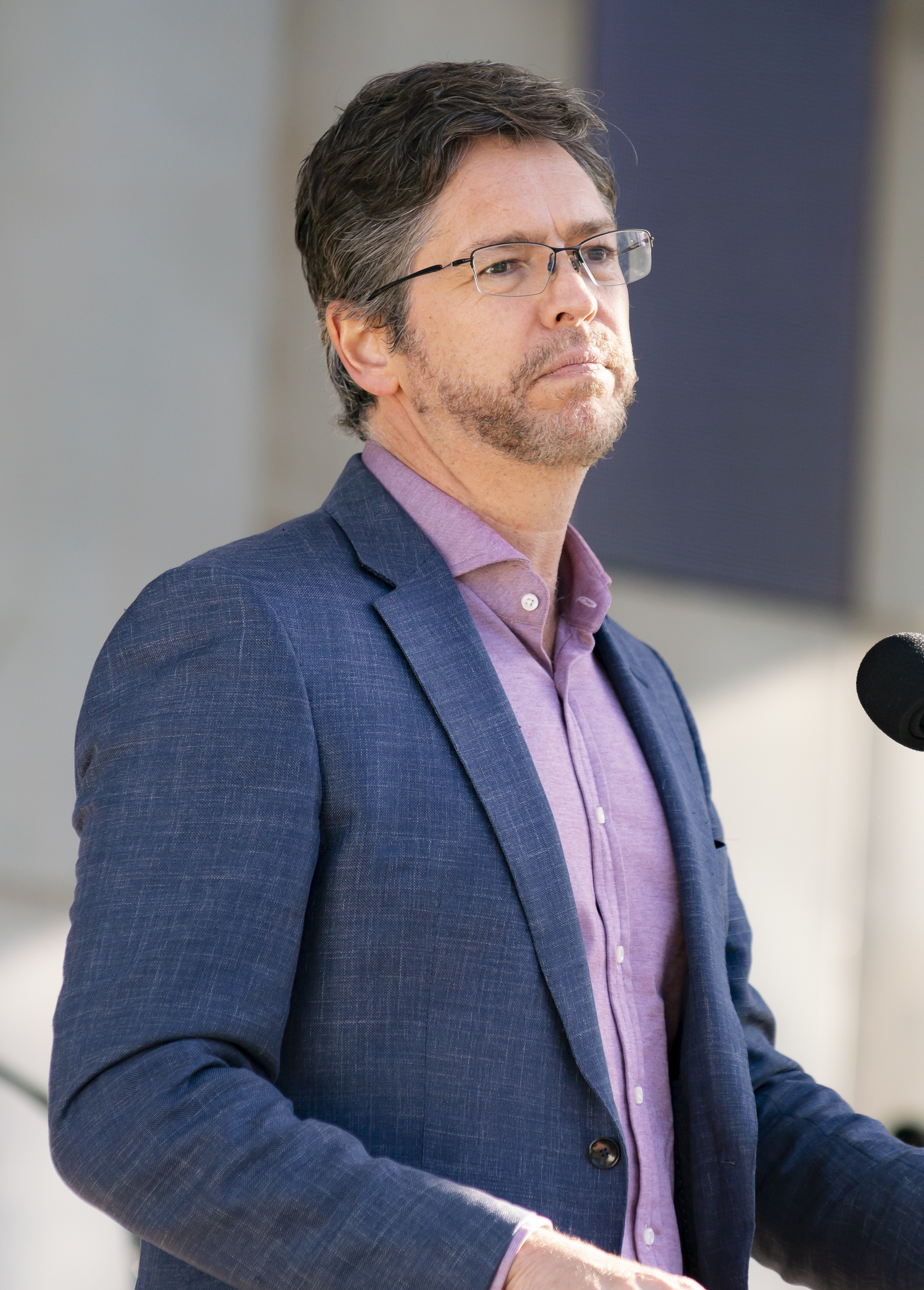
- Reece in 2022

105th Lord Mayor of Melbourne
- Incumbent
- Assumed office 2 July 2024
- Deputy: Roshena Campbell (November 2024–present)
- Preceded by: Sally Capp

Deputy Lord Mayor of Melbourne
- In office 10 November 2020 – 2 July 2024
- Preceded by: Arron Wood
- Succeeded by: Roshena Campbell

Councillor of the City of Melbourne
- In office November 2016 – 10 November 2020

Personal details
- Born: 1974 (age 51–52) London, United Kingdom
- Party: Labor
- Other political affiliations: Team Nick Reece (2024–present); Team Sally Capp (2016−2024)

Nicholas Reece (born 10 February 1974) is an Australian politician and policy activist who has served as the lord mayor of the City of Melbourne since 2024. He is a senior executive at the University of Melbourne and a principal fellow at the Melbourne School of Government. He is the chair of the board of directors at the Movember Foundation, and a commentator at Sky News Australia.

He previously held a number of roles in politics, including as secretary and campaign director of the Victorian Labor Party and as the director of strategy to former Prime Minister Julia Gillard. Reece's early career included time working as a lawyer at Maurice Blackburn and as a journalist at the Australian Financial Review.

== Early life, education and early career ==
Reece was born in the United Kingdom in 1974 and moved to Australia with his family when he was young. He holds a Bachelor of Economics and Law degree from Monash University. He also graduated from ANZSOG (The Australia and New Zealand School of Government) with an Executive Master of Public Administration in 2006. Reece began his career as a lawyer with Maurice Blackburn and later worked as a financial journalist with the Australian Financial Review.

== Political career ==
=== Labor Party ===
Until 2012, Reece held a number of roles as a ministerial staffer and Australian Labor Party executive, including:

- State Secretary and Campaign Director of the Victorian Branch of the Australian Labor Party
- Senior Adviser to Prime Minister Julia Gillard (Director of Strategy)
- Senior Adviser to Premier John Brumby (Deputy Chief of Staff, Head of Policy)
- Senior Adviser to Premier Steve Bracks (Press Secretary, Senior Economic Adviser)
- Adviser, Policy Unit, Leader of the Opposition Kevin Rudd, 2007

=== Melbourne City Council ===
In 2016, Reece was elected as a councillor to the Melbourne City Council as a member of Team Doyle. Reece joined Team Sally Capp for the 2020 election, and he was elected as Deputy Lord Mayor.

On 2 July 2024, following the resignation of Sally Capp, Reece was sworn in as 105th Lord Mayor of the City of Melbourne. In the 2024 Melbourne City Council election, Reece retained his position as Lord Mayor, winning 23.36 percent of primary votes cast and 61.49 percent of the two-candidate-preferred vote.

== Media career ==
In 2015, Reece appeared in the award-winning documentary The Killing Season, which recounted the leadership struggles between Kevin Rudd and Julia Gillard between 2010 and 2013.

Reece is a political commentator on Sky News and was the host of Politics HQ between 2017 and 2019. Reece also writes a regular column for The Age.

== Personal life ==
Reece and his wife Felicity have three daughters. He lives in Carlton and is a supporter of the Carlton Football Club. Reece was a founding director for the street newspaper The Big Issue, a role he served in for 10 years.

In 2004, he was one of the original "mo-bros" who raised funds for the Movember Foundation. Since then, Movember has raised almost $1 billion for prostate cancer, testicular cancer and men's mental health. Reece has served as a Non-Executive Director on the Movember Foundation Board of Directors since the establishment of the Board in 2007.
