= 2024 Melbourne City Council election =

Australian local government election

- 26 October 2024
- Leadership Team
- Turnout: 67.73% (▲1.00)
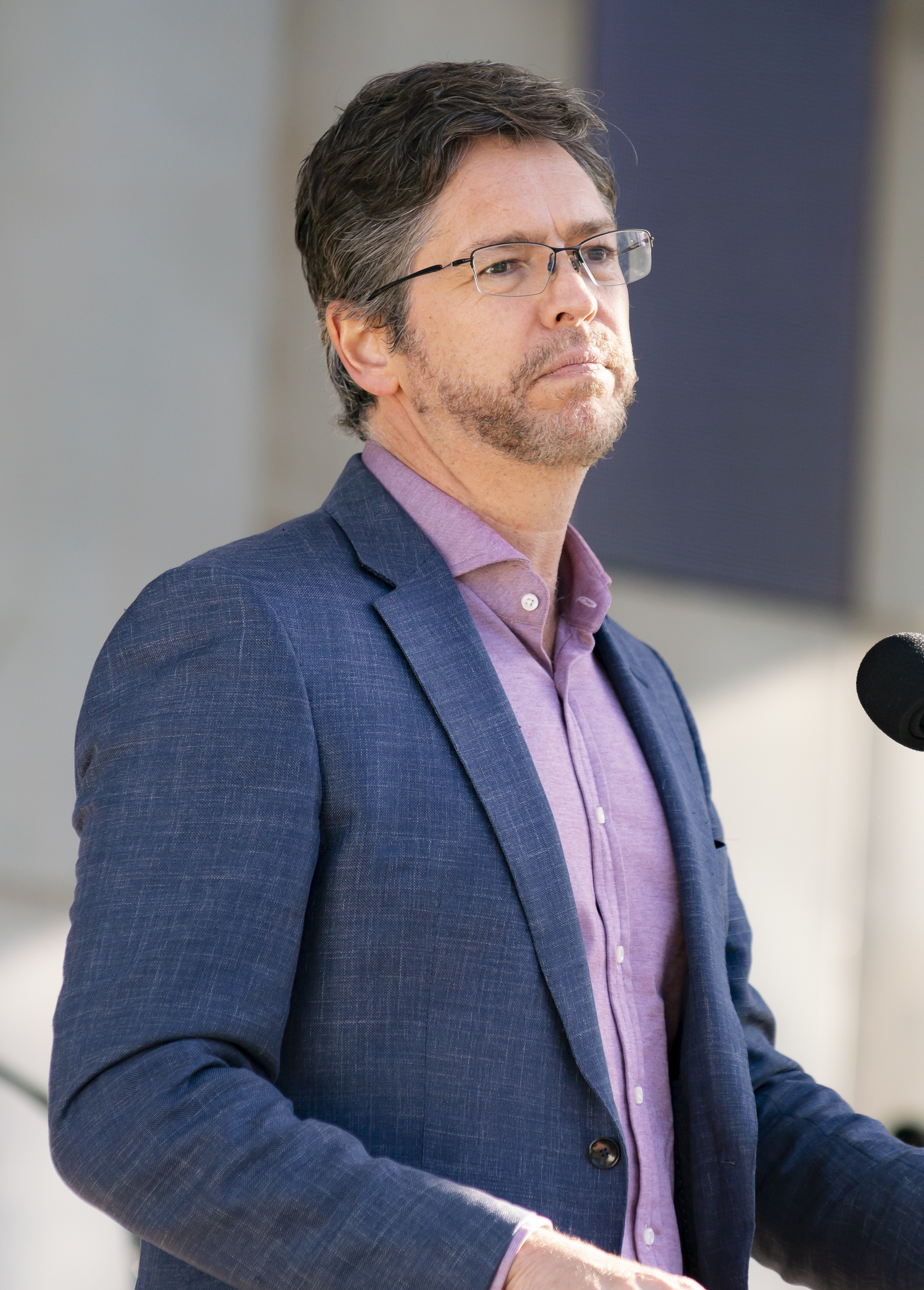

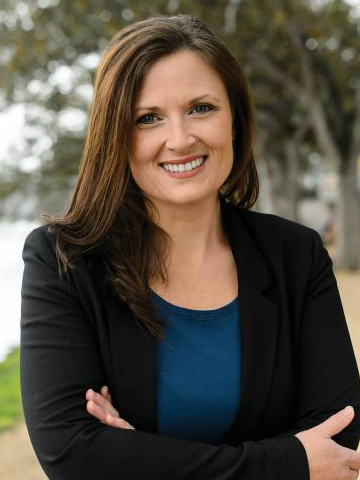

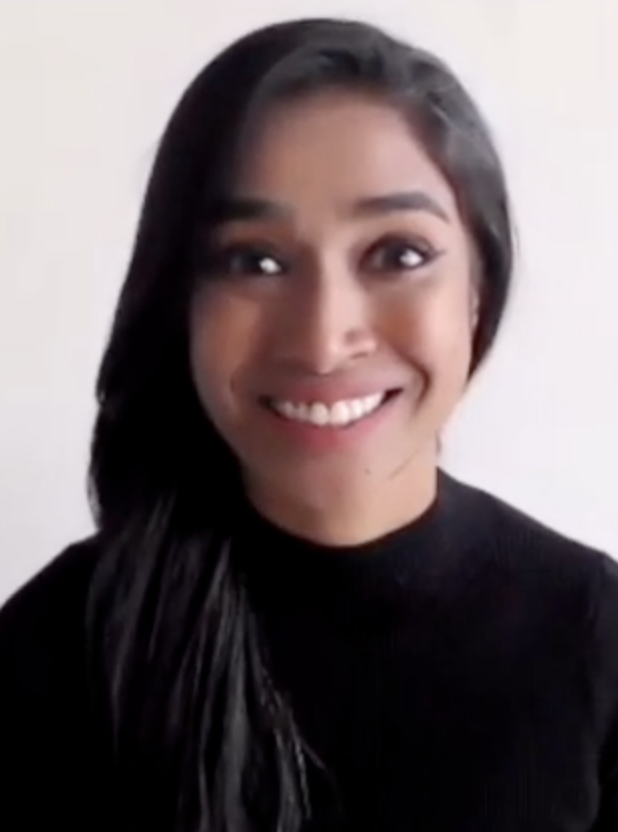

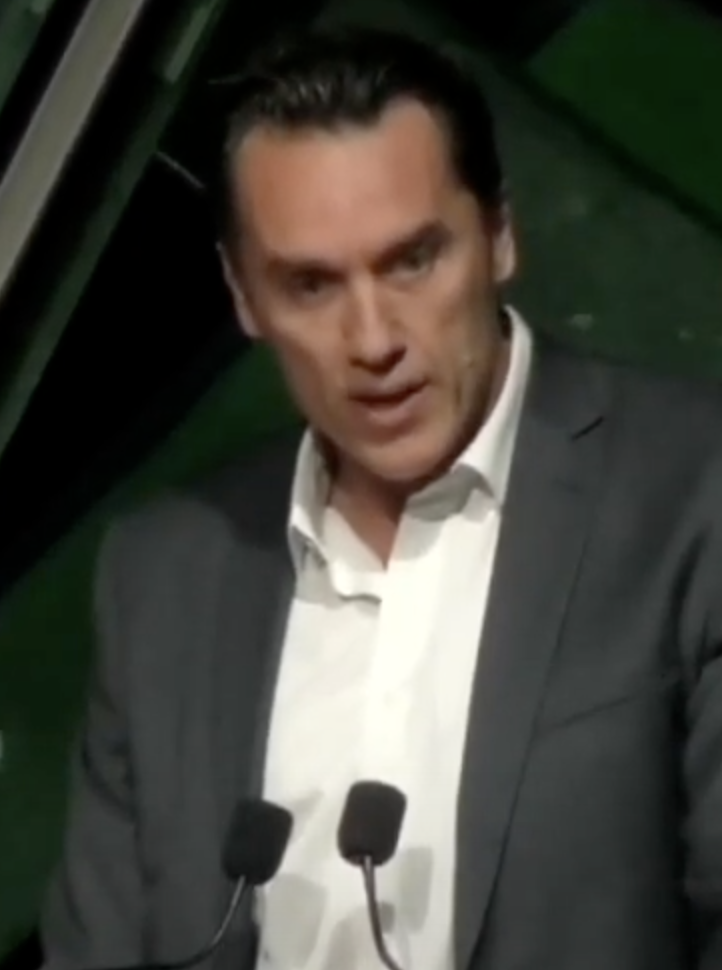

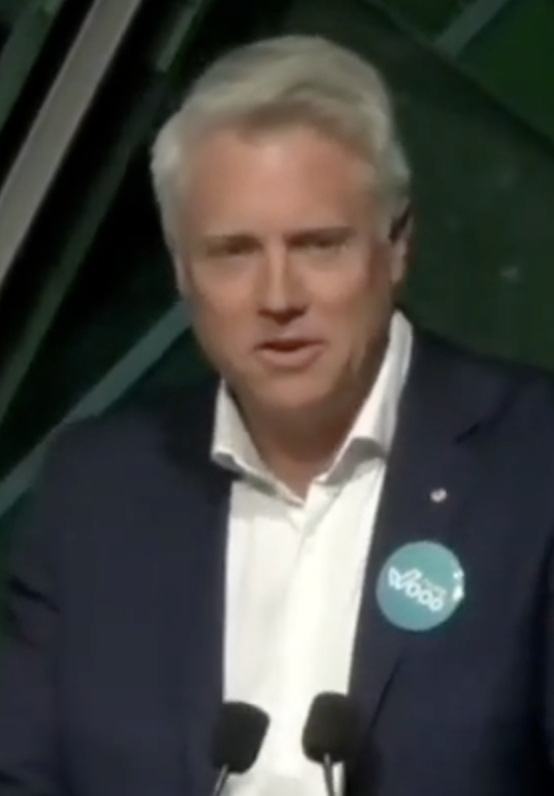

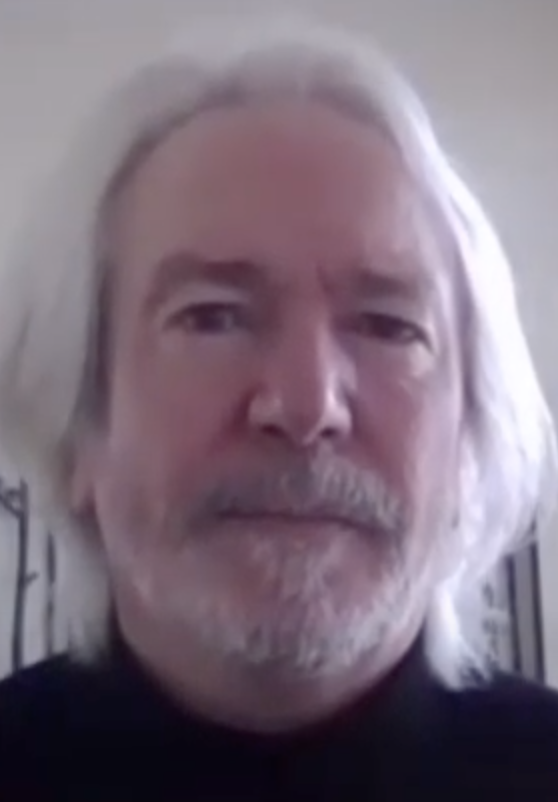
| Candidate | Nicholas Reece | Roxane Ingleton | Mariam Riza |
| Party | Team Nick Reece | Greens | Liberal |
| Running mate | Roshena Campbell | Marley McRae McLeod | Luke Martin |
| Primary vote | 20,523 | 12,445 | 11,985 |
| Percentage | 23.36% | 14.17% | 13.64% |
| 2CP | 61.49% | 38.51% |
| 2CP swing | ▲8.05 | ▲38.51 |
| Candidate | Anthony Koutoufides | Arron Wood | Phil Reed |
| Party | Team Kouta | Team Wood | Labor |
| Running mate | Intaj Khan | Erin Deering | Virginia Wills |
| Primary vote | 11,345 | 8,856 | 5,930 |
| Percentage | 12.91% | 10.08% | 6.75% |
Lord Mayor before election
Nicholas Reece
Team Sally Capp
Elected Lord Mayor
Nicholas Reece
Team Nick Reece

The 2024 Melbourne City Council election was held on 26 October 2024 to elect nine councillors and a leadership team (consisting of a lord mayor and deputy lord mayor) to the Council. The election was held as part of the statewide local government elections in Victoria, Australia.

Incumbent lord mayor Nicholas Reece was re-elected with 61.5% of the two-candidate-preferred vote.

== Background ==
=== Sally Capp resignation ===
On 28 March 2024, then-Lord Mayor Sally Capp announced that she would resign before the election. She resigned as lord mayor on 1 July 2024. At a special meeting the next day council resolved not to hold an election to fill the lord mayor vacancy but to appoint Deputy Lord Mayor Nicholas Reece to the position rather than hold a byelection at a cost of up to $1.3 million. Further, council resolved not to appoint a councillor to the position of deputy lord mayor, which may have triggered a countback to appoint a new councillor. The council saw out the remainder of the term with 10 councillors.

== Electoral system ==
The leadership team is elected using preferential voting.

Like in state and federal elections, the leadership team election uses full preferential voting, meaning voters must number every team that is running.

The councillors are elected using single transferable voting, using the city as a single at-large district.

For the councillor election, group voting tickets (GVT) are used − a group registers a GVT before an election, and when a voter selects a group above-the-line on the ballot paper, their vote is distributed according to the registered GVT for that group. Alternatively, a voter can number all boxes for individual candidates below-the-line.

Individual candidates are not able to contest both the leadership team election and the councillor election. The leadership team election is separate from the election of councillors. This means that even if a group's leadership team candidates are unsuccessful, members of their councillor ticket can still be elected.

=== Business and property owner vote ===
Corporations, owners and occupiers of rateable properties are entitled to vote in Melbourne City Council elections, with two voters who are not residents of the City of Melbourne automatically enrolled in relation to the majority of these such entitlements: the only LGA in Victoria where this is the case. Non-resident voters do not have to be Australian citizens.

At the 2020 election, the Melbourne City Council electoral roll was composed of 55.1% non-resident corporate and rateable property-owning and -occupying voters, with local residents making up the remaining 44.9%.

A similar electoral system in New South Wales previously applied to Sydney City Council, where businesses were each entitled to two voters - though these non-resident voters formed a much smaller proportion of the overall electoral roll compared to Melbourne. This was introduced in 2014 but abolished in 2023 ahead of the 2024 election.

== Candidates ==
Candidates for election organise themselves into tickets, either under a Team name or a registered political party. Some political parties permit their members to run in a team as unaffiliated candidates, and other parties will run an endorsed ticket only.

=== Prominent teams ===
==== Team Reece ====
After being sworn in as lord mayor of Melbourne on 2 July 2024 following the resignation of Sally Capp, Reece confirmed he would seek re-election, although he would not be running as an endorsed Labor Party candidate. He announced incumbent councillor Roshena Campbell, a Liberal Party member, as his running mate on 28 July.

==== Team Wood ====
Arron Wood announced that he was standing as the lord mayor candidate for Team Wood on 31 Jul 2024, along with Erin Deering in the deputy lord mayor position.

On 9 Oct 2024, Team Wood revealed the councillor group line up with sitting councillor Phil Le Liu at the top of the council ticket, former councillor Dr Cathy Oke in second position, followed by Nicolas Zervos, Hala Nur, Michael Caiafa, Hope Wei, and Labor Party member Steve Michelson.

==== Team Hakim ====
First-term councillor Jamal Hakim announced his candidacy on 2 August, with Australian Republic Movement co-chair Esther Anatolitis as his running mate.

==== Rip Up The Bike Lanes ====
Perennial candidate Anthony van der Craats appeared on the leadership ballot under the group name ‘Rip Up The Bike Lanes’. It was revealed after the election that, although Mr van der Craats genuinely believed that separated bike lanes should be removed, he was “running to help Team Reece”.

=== Political parties ===
==== Labor ====
The Labor Party officially launched their campaign on 28 August 2024, with Phil Reed as their lord mayoral candidate for the second election in a row and Virginia Wills as the deputy candidate.Incumbent councillor Davydd Griffiths was announced as lead councillor candidate.

Labor party members, including the incumbent Lord Mayor Nicholas Reece, also featured on other tickets in competition with the endorsed Labor ticket.

==== Greens ====
The Greens launched their campaign on 26 July 2024, with Roxane Ingleton as their lord mayoral candidate (Ingleton was the deputy lord mayoral candidate for the party in the two previous elections) and Marley McRae McLeod as the deputy. Incumbent councillor Dr Olivia Ball was announced as the lead councillor candidate.

==== Liberal ====
The Victorian Liberal Party endorsed candidates for the first time in the party's history. The party announced Owen Guest as lead councillor candidate.

==== Victorian Socialists ====
The Victorian Socialists ran two councillor candidates but, unlike in the previous election, did not run a lord mayor or deputy lord mayor candidate. The party did not submit a group voting ticket for the councillor election before the deadline and as such did not have a box printed above the line on the ballot paper.

==== Retiring councillors ====
Sitting councillors Jason Chang, Rohan Leppert and Elizabeth O'Sullivan-Myles did not recontest the election.

==== Non contenders ====
In February 2024, former senator Derryn Hinch announced he would run for lord mayor of Melbourne. However, one month later he withdrew, citing the costs of running a campaign.

=== Leadership Team ===
There were eleven leadership contenders for the election.

| Party | Candidate | Background |
|---|---|---|
| Labor | Phil Reed | 2020 Labor lord mayoral candidate |
| Labor | Virginia Wills | |
| Liberal | Mariam Riza | |
| Liberal | Luke Martin | |
| Greens | Roxane Ingleton | 2016 and 2020 Greens deputy lord mayoral candidate |
| Greens | Marley McRae McLeod | 2022 Greens Victorian state election candidate for Macedon district |
| Animal Justice | Eylem Kim | Researcher and PhD candidate |
| Animal Justice | Bruce Poon | Animal Justice Party president and 2016 AJP lord mayoral candidate |
| Team Hakim | Jamal Hakim | Councillor since 2020 |
| Team Hakim | Esther Anatolitis | Co-chair of the Australian Republic Movement |
| Team Kouta | Anthony Koutoufides | Former Carlton AFL player |
| Team Kouta | Intaj Khan | Property developer and former Wyndham City Councillor |
| Team Morgan | Gary Morgan | Pollster and perennial candidate |
| Team Morgan | Liz Ge | |
| Team Nick Reece | Nicholas Reece | Lord mayor since 2024 |
| Team Nick Reece | Roshena Campbell | Councillor since 2020 and 2023 Liberal candidate for Aston by-election |
| Rip Up the Bike Lanes! | Anthony van der Craats | Perennial candidate |
| Rip Up the Bike Lanes! | David Keith Cragg | |
| Voices for Melbourne | Greg Bisinella | East Melbourne Group president |
| Voices for Melbourne | Megan Stevenson | |
| Team Wood | Arron Wood | 2020 lord mayoral candidate |
| Team Wood | Erin Deering | Entrepreneur and fashion designer |

== Results ==
=== Leadership Team ===
2024 Victorian local elections: Melbourne (Leadership Team)
| Party | Candidate | Votes | % | ±% |
|---|---|---|---|---|
| Team Nick Reece | Nick Reece (Note: Also a Labor Party member.); Roshena Campbell (Note: Also a Liberal Party member.) | 20,523 | 23.36 | −8.24 (Note: Compared with Team Sally Capp at the 2020 election.) |
| Greens | Roxane Ingleton; Marley McRae McLeod | 12,445 | 14.17 | −2.51 |
| Liberal | Mariam Riza; Luke Martin | 11,985 | 13.64 | +13.64 |
| Team Kouta | Anthony Koutoufides; Intaj Khan | 11,345 | 12.91 | +12.91 |
| Team Wood | Arron Wood; Erin Deering | 8,856 | 10.08 | −5.18 |
| Labor | Phil Reed; Virginia Wills | 5,930 | 6.75 | −2.70 |
| Team Morgan | Gary Morgan; Liz Ge | 4,281 | 4.87 | +2.10 |
| Team Hakim | Jamal Hakim; Esther Anatolitis | 3,766 | 4.29 | +4.29 |
| Rip Up the Bike Lanes! | Anthony van der Craats; David Keith Cragg | 3,706 | 4.22 | +4.22 |
| Voices for Melbourne | Greg Bisinella; Megan Stevenson | 3,079 | 3.50 | +3.50 |
| Animal Justice | Eylem Kim; Bruce Poon | 1,936 | 2.20 | +2.20 |
| Total formal votes | | 87,852 | 95.02 | −1.60 |
| Informal votes | | 4,603 | 4.98 | +1.60 |
| Turnout | | 92,455 | 67.73 | +1.00 |
Two-candidate-preferred result
| Team Nick Reece | Nick Reece; Roshena Campbell | 54,018 | 61.49 | +8.05 (Note: Compared with Team Sally Capp at the 2020 election.) |
| Greens | Roxane Ingleton; Marley McRae McLeod | 33,834 | 38.51 | +38.51 |
| Team Nick Reece hold | | Swing | N/A | |

=== Councillors ===
2024 Victorian local elections: Melbourne (councillors)
| Party | Candidate | Votes | % | ±% |
|---|---|---|---|---|
| Team Nick Reece | 1. Kevin Louey (elected 1); 2. Mark Scott (elected 6); 3. Lisa Teh; 4. Jannine Pattison; 5. Hamdi Ali; 6. Suzanne Stanley; 7. Simone Hartley-Keane | 18,558 | 20.71 | –6.02 (Note: Compared with Team Sally Capp at the 2020 election.) |
| Liberal | 1. Owen Guest (elected 2); 2. You Li Liston | 12,841 | 14.33 | +14.33 |
| Greens | 1. Olivia Ball (elected 3); 2. Aaron Moon; 3. Barry Berih | 12,692 | 14.16 | –1.84 |
| Team Kouta | 1. Gladys Liu (elected 4); 2. Zaim Ramani; 3. Emma Elizabeth Carney; 4. Olivia Tjandramulia | 10,588 | 11.82 | +11.82 |
| Team Wood | 1. Philip Le Liu (elected 5); 2. Cathy Oke; 3. Nicolas Paul Zervos; 4. Hala Nur; 5. Michael-Lee Caiafa; 6. Hope Lai Wei; 7. Steve Michelson | 9,366 | 10.45 | –2.90 |
| Labor | 1. Davydd Griffiths (elected 9); 2. Sainab Abdi Sheikh; 3. Michael Aleisi | 6,494 | 7.25 | –4.39 |
| Team Morgan | 1. Rafael Camillo (elected 7); 2. William Caldwell | 3,654 | 4.08 | +2.39 |
| Rip Up the Bike Lanes! | 1. Sandra Gee; 2. Pratap Singh | 2,878 | 3.21 | +3.21 |
| Team Hakim | 1. Michael Smith; 2. Lawrence Lam; 3. Judy Gao | 2,813 | 3.14 | +2.73 |
| Voices for Melbourne | 1. Mary Masters; 2. James Vasilev-Robertson | 2,689 | 3.00 | +3.00 |
| Animal Justice | 1. Aashna Katyal; 2. Rabin Bangaar | 1,688 | 1.88 | +0.19 |
| Innovate Melbourne | 1. Andrew Rowse (elected 8); 2. Jesse Greenwood | 1,547 | 1.73 | +0.84 |
| Your Voice Matters to Me | 1. Krystle Mitchell (Note: Also a Libertarian Party member.); 2. Jayden Durbin | 1,134 | 1.27 | +1.27 |
| Team Elvis Martin | 1. Elvis Martin; 2. Sophy Galbally; 3. Mavi Mujral; 4. Jing Lin; 5. Paul James Moore; 6. Melissa Rymer; 7. James Cullen; 8. Carole Kenny-Sarasa | 1,000 | 1.12 | +1.12 |
| Victorian Socialists | 1. Daniel Nair Dadich; 2. Ben Fok | 500 | 0.56 | –1.02 |
| Team Participate | 1. Asako Saito; 2. Sam Janda | 461 | 0.51 | +0.51 |
| Ungrouped | Ekaterina Send; Jake Land; Aishwarya Kansakar; Mohamed Yusuf; Callum John French | 703 | 0.78 | +0.42 |
| Total formal votes | | 89,606 | 97.67 | –0.48 |
| Informal votes | | 2,139 | 2.33 | +0.48 |
| Turnout | | 91,745 | 67.21 | +0.67 |

=== Analysis ===
The Age observed that the Melbourne City Council election results had produced a net increase in Liberal Party members and a net decrease in both Labor Party and Greens Party members. The Age also observed that the Council would now have a high proportion of male councillors (72.73%), the second highest proportion among the 31 councils in metropolitan Melbourne.

== Campaign ==
=== Regent Theatre sale ===
On 8 September 2024, Reece announced he wanted Melbourne City Council to sell its 51% share of the Regent Theatre if he was re-elected. An urgent motion at a council meeting was tabled by councillor Jamal Hakim, noting that council has "no intention or policy basis to sell the Regent theatre" was passed several days later with six votes in favour.

The proposal to sell Regent Theatre was opposed by Team Wood, Team Hakim, Labor and the Greens.

It was later discovered that the owner of the Regent Theatre, Jason Marriner, had donated to the election campaigns of Team Reece, Team Wood and Team Hakim.

=== Endorsements ===
| Group | Endorsement |
|---|---|
| Victorian Chamber of Commerce and Industry | Team Wood |
| The Age | No endorsement |

=== Donations ===
While The Greens and Team Hakim disclosed election donations during the campaign, the Lord Mayor’s Team Reece declined to do so. When all candidates’ donations were disclosed after the election, it was revealed that Team Reece had received approximately $1 million in donations, ‘dwarfing’ the 2020 winner’s election warchest, and giving rise to speculation that the council would be "mired in conflicts of interest".

=== Concessions ===
Arron Wood, who was seen as a frontrunner going into the election, conceded defeat on 29 October.

=== Debates and forums ===
A number of community groups, residents associations and media organisations hosted Meet the Lord Mayor Candidates events. Not all candidates were invited to all events, nor do all invitees participate.

| P | Participant |
| A | Absent |
| N | Non-invitee |
| U | Unknown if attended |

==== List of debates and forums ====
| Date | Host | Participants | | | | | | | | | | |
| Date | Host | RIP | AJP | HAK | NICK | MOR | KOU | LIB | WOO | GRN | VFM | ALP |
|---|---|---|---|---|---|---|---|---|---|---|---|---|
| 23 September 2024 | Community3008 | U | U | U | U | U | U | U | U | U | U | U |
| 25 September 2024 | Future Forte | A | A | P | P | A | A | A | P | P | P | P |
| 30 September 2024 | YIMBY Melbourne/Housing All Australians/6 News | A | A | P | P | A | P | P | P | P | P | P |
| 3 October 2024 | Residents 3000 | P | P | P | P | P | P | P | P | P | P | P |
| 6 October 2024 | Melbourne South Yarra Residents Group | P | P | P | P | P | P | P | P | P | P | P |
| 9 October 2024 | Victorian Chamber of Commerce and Industry | A | N | P | P | P | P | N | P | N | A | P |
| 10 October 2024 | ABC Radio Melbourne | N | N | N | P | N | P | N | P | P | N | N |
| 10 October 2024 | Southbank Residents Association | P | P | P | P | P | P | P | P | P | P | P |
| 15 October 2024 | Carlton Residents Association | U | U | U | U | U | U | U | U | U | U | U |
| 16 October 2024 | Chinatown Precinct Association | A | A | P | P | A | P | P | P | A | P | P |
| 22 October 2024 | Nine News Melbourne | N | N | N | P | N | P | N | P | P | N | N |

== How-to-vote cards ==
For the leadership team election, candidates can provide how-to-vote cards with recommendations for voters on how to preference other parties. Unlike for the councillor election, which uses group voting tickets, the preference recommendations are non-binding.

=== Leadership Team ===
| Party | How-to-vote card (read column from top down) | | | | | | | | | | |
| Party | RIP | AJP | HAK | NICK | MOR | KOU | LIB | WOO | GRN | VFM | ALP |
|---|---|---|---|---|---|---|---|---|---|---|---|
| Rip Up the Bike Lanes! | 1 | 10 | 11 | 11 | 5 | 5 | 6 | 9 | 11 | 11 | 11 |
| Animal Justice | 2 | 1 | 3 | 10 | 9 | 7 | 10 | 6 | 3 | 6 | 4 |
| Team Hakim | 3 | 2 | 1 | 7 | 10 | 8 | 7 | 4 | 2 | 2 | 3 |
| Team Nick Reece | 4 | 7 | 10 | 1 | 3 | 3 | 3 | 10 | 7 | 9 | 7 |
| Team Morgan | 5 | 9 | 8 | 2 | 1 | 2 | 4 | 11 | 9 | 7 | 10 |
| Team Kouta | 6 | 8 | 9 | 3 | 2 | 1 | 2 | 8 | 10 | 10 | 9 |
| Liberal | 7 | 11 | 7 | 5 | 4 | 4 | 1 | 5 | 8 | 8 | 8 |
| Team Wood | 8 | 4 | 6 | 9 | 6 | 10 | 8 | 1 | 6 | 5 | 5 |
| Greens | 9 | 3 | 4 | 6 | 11 | 11 | 11 | 7 | 1 | 3 | 6 |
| Voices for Melbourne | 10 | 6 | 2 | 8 | 7 | 6 | 5 | 2 | 4 | 1 | 2 |
| Labor | 11 | 5 | 5 | 4 | 8 | 9 | 9 | 3 | 5 | 4 | 1 |
