= Roshena Campbell =

Australian politician

Deputy Lord Mayor of Melbourne
- Incumbent
- Assumed office 19 November 2024
- Mayor: Nicholas Reece
- Preceded by: Nicholas Reece

Councillor of the City of Melbourne
- Incumbent
- Assumed office 24 October 2020

Personal details
- Party: Liberal; Team Nick Reece (2024−)
- Other political affiliations: Team Sally Capp (2020−2024)
- Spouse: James Campbell
- Children: 4
- Education: The University of Melbourne (LLM); Monash University (LLB (Hons)/BA)
- Occupation: Barrister, politician

Roshena Campbell is an Australian barrister and politician who is currently the Deputy Lord Mayor of Melbourne since 2024 and has served as a member of the City of Melbourne council since 2020. Campbell unsuccessfully contested the Division of Aston for the Liberal Party of Australia in the 2023 by-election. In August 2026, the Liberal Party's Victorian state executive selected Campbell to run for the Upper House in the Western Metropolitan Region in the 2026 Victorian State Election.

== Early life and education ==
Campbell's parents migrated from India to Sydney, New South Wales in the 1970s. Speaking on her upbringing, Campbell stated that her parents were small business owners who supported the Liberal premiership of John Howard and the tenure of Peter Costello as Treasurer.

At age 17, Campbell moved to Melbourne by herself. She attended the Monash University Faculty of Law, and also the University of Melbourne where she received a Master of Law degree in 2010.

== Career ==
After graduating from Monash University, Campbell worked for leading commercial law firm Corrs Chambers Westgarth. She went on to become a commercial and public law barrister in 2016. Campbell was elected a City of Melbourne councillor in the 2020 election. She was among the members of the council elected in alliance with Sally Capp. In 2024, Campbell was the running mate of Nicholas Reece who was contesting the role of Lord Mayor at the 2024 Melbourne City Council election. They were successful, defeating 10 other party tickets after preferences.

== Policy positions ==
=== Public safety and CCTV ===
As Deputy Lord Mayor, Campbell has supported increased expenditure on public safety measures, including expanded CCTV coverage, additional safety patrols and improved lighting in the central city. These initiatives formed part of the 2025/26 budget and were presented as measures intended to improve perceptions of safety for residents, visitors and businesses.

=== Economic recovery and business support ===
Campbell has frequently argued for policies aimed at supporting Melbourne's economic recovery and strengthening the city centre's attractiveness for businesses, workers and visitors. She has been a supporter of council making it easier to open a business in Melbourne and reducing red tape, including the creation of a business concierge service that has halved the time it takes to open a business in the City of Melbourne. She has been critical of the Victorian Labor Government's 'Work From Home' policy, arguing that flexible work arrangements are a matter between employers and employees, and is already provided for in federal legislation.

=== Transport and bike lanes ===
Campbell has been a prominent critic of aspects of the City of Melbourne's protected bike lane program. While serving as deputy chair of the transport portfolio, she argued that the removal of traffic lanes had contributed to congestion and hindered economic recovery in the central city following the COVID-19 pandemic. In 2022 she stepped down from her transport portfolio role after publicly opposing what she described as council "anti-car measures" and elements of the bike lane rollout. Campbell has also opposed the state government's congestion levy which she argued deterred city visitation and support for small businesses.

=== Medically supervised injecting room ===
Campbell has consistently opposed the establishment of a medically supervised injecting room within the City of Melbourne municipality. In 2021 she moved a council motion opposing the proposal, arguing against locating such a facility in Melbourne's CBD. That motion was defeated but council subsequently voted to oppose a supervised injecting service.

== Political candidacies ==
=== 2021 parliamentary selection effort ===
In 2021, the Australian Financial Review (AFR) reported that Campbell who had been considered a potential Senate preselection candidate instead sought preselection for the Division of Casey in the 2022 federal election. The AFR reported that journalist and former Liberal staffer James Campbell, the husband of the candidate, supported her pre-selection and became the primary carer of their children during the preselection period.

=== 2023 Aston by-election ===
In 2023, Campbell contested the Division of Aston in a 2023 by-election following the resignation of Liberal MP Alan Tudge. Campbell was selected as the Liberal candidate by the state party's administration committee, defeating preselection candidates oncologist Ranjana Srivastava and former Liberal MP Cathrine Burnett-Wake. During the selection process, Campbell received the support of former MP and Treasurer of Australia Josh Frydenberg.

Had Campbell won, she would have made history as the first woman of Indian descent to serve as a Liberal member of parliament. Campbell ultimately lost the by-election to Mary Doyle, the candidate of the Labor Party. During her concession speech, Campbell stated that "I will always be proud to be a Liberal and I will always be proud to be Australian because we live in the greatest country in the world."

== Personal life ==
Campbell is married to News Corporation political editor James Campbell and is the mother of 4 children. Campbell resides in Brunswick, Victoria.
