= Carlton Gardens Primary School =

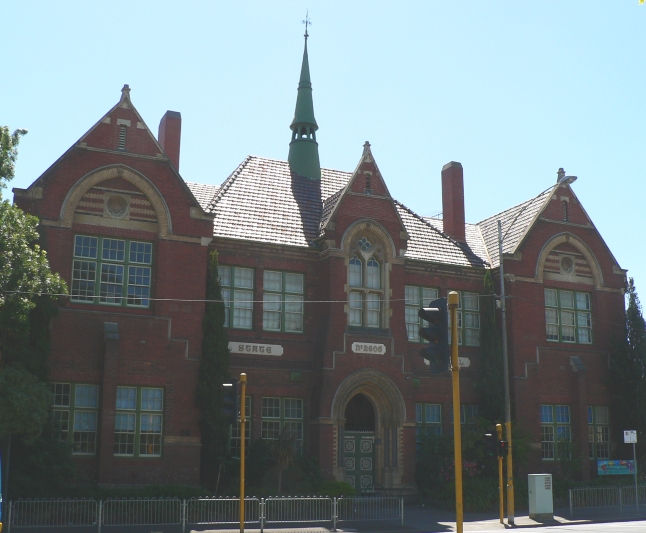

Location
- 215 Rathdowne Street, Carlton, Victoria; Melbourne, Victoria, Australia
- 37°48′7″S 144°58′9″E

Information
- Type: Primary
- Motto: Delivering Our Best
- Established: 1884
- Principal: Nathan Gage
- Years offered: Prep–6 (mixed sex)
- Website: www.carltongardens.vic.edu.au

Carlton Gardens Primary School (number 2605) is a historic state school in inner Melbourne, Victoria, Australia. It is located at 215 Rathdowne Street, Carlton, between Grattan and Pelham streets, overlooking the Carlton Gardens.

It is one of the closest schools to the Melbourne central business district, and is near the Melbourne Museum, RMIT and the University of Melbourne, with which the school has historic links. A large quantity of the students have their parents working in the University of Melbourne.

== History ==
Opened in 1884, Carlton Gardens Primary School has operated continuously since that time, though it was briefly used as a hospital during the Flu epidemic of 1918. It was built in one of the first subdivisions of land outside central Melbourne. The grounds were bought by the Education Department from landowner Thomas O'Grady in 1869 and described at the time as "one of the best, if not the best in Carlton".

During its history the school has been alternatively known as Rathdowne Street Primary School and Carlton Primary School. Its main building facing the Rathdowne Street is a prominent heritage building constructed in 1884.
