= Anthony Koutoufides =

Australian rules footballer (born 1973)

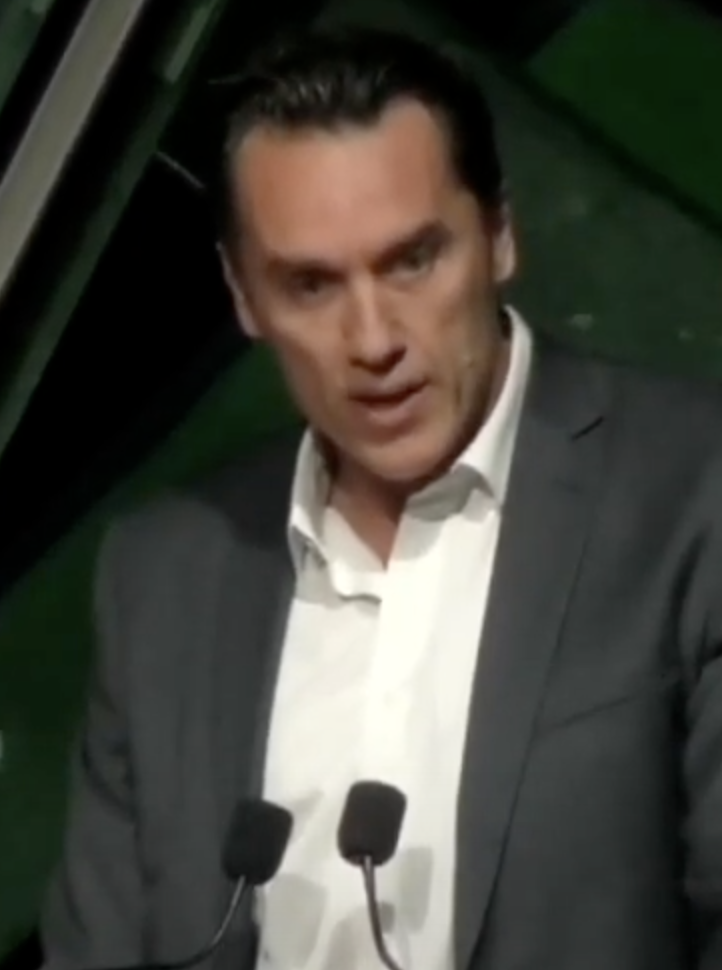

Personal information
- Nickname: Kouta
- Born: 18 January 1973 (age 53); Lalor, Victoria
- Original team: Lalor (NFNL)
- Debut: Round 13, 1992, Carlton vs. Adelaide, at Princes Park
- Height: 191 cm (6 ft 3 in)
- Weight: 98 kg (216 lb)
- Position: Utility

Playing career^{1}
Years	Club	Games (Goals)
1992–2007	Carlton	278 (226)
- ^{1} Playing statistics correct to the end of 2007.

Career highlights
- AFL premiership player: 1995; Leigh Matthews Trophy (AFLPA MVP): 2000; 2x Robert Reynolds Trophy: 2001, 2005; 2x All Australian: 1995, 2000; Carlton Captain: 2004–2006; Carlton Leading Goalkicker: 1997; AFL and Carlton life-member; Victorian State of Origin: 1999; Australian Football Hall of Fame inductee 2014; Greek Team of the Century: Vice-Captain; VFL/AFL Italian Team of the Century: Centre Half-Back

Anthony Koutoufides (/kuːtuˈfiːdiːz/; born 18 January 1973), also known by his nickname of Kouta, is a retired Australian rules footballer who played for the Carlton Football Club in the Australian Football League (AFL). Considered by many as one of the most powerful and athletic players of all time, he played in almost every position and was often called the prototype of the modern footballer.

Of Greek Cypriot and Italian descent, Koutoufides has been an Australian celebrity, making numerous television appearances both during and after his football career. He was a gladiator in the Australian television series Gladiators in character as Kouta, "a Gladiator touched by the gods" and won the Australian version of Dancing with the Stars in 2006.

== Early life ==
The son of Anna (a migrant from Northern Italy) and Jim Koutoufides (a Greek-Cypriot refugee from Egypt) he was born and raised in Lalor, Victoria a suburb in Melbourne near the border of Thomastown. He was raised in Thomastown and began playing football for the Lalor Football Club juniors and was schooled at Lalor Secondary College.

Koutoufides was an outstanding track and field athlete, competing from grade six and winning gold in high jump at the 1984 Australian All Schools Championships. He also competed in the 110m hurdles and the discus. He aspired to the Olympics.

His older brother Paul Koutoufides (who also played for Lalor and East Thomastown) was recruited by Carlton. The club had also pursued Anthony, however, he initially rejected a 3-year professional contract to focus on amateur athletics. After his brother made his reserves debut for Carlton on Round 22 1990 Koutoufides followed him as a career move and was officially recruited by the club. He played 50 games in the reserves, where he won the 1991 reserves best and fairest with Carlton.

== AFL career ==
Anthony made his AFL debut in 1992, quickly establishing himself as one of the most versatile and athletic players ever to play the game.

His profile grew through the early to mid-1990s, and he was a star of the game by 1995. Koutoufides was best known for both his strong mark, and his incredible one-handed capability at stoppages. He was better than any other player in the league at picking the ball up off the ground with one hand, and then looping that arm over opponents to set up clearing handpasses. He played in Carlton's 1995 premiership, earning All-Australian selection in that year.

From 1996 to 1999, Koutoufides was a solid contributor to the team, playing more often in key positions. This was usually in defence, but played some games in the forward line, scoring his career-best 6.4 against Collingwood in 1997. He was the club leading goalkicker in 1997 with 28 goals. In 1999, he was selected in the final Victorian State of Origin team, his only ever Big V.

Koutoufides rose to greatness in 2000, his best season. He played 20 games, averaging 26 disposals, over six marks and nearly two goals a game. He managed his career-high 39 disposals against Sydney in Round 8. He was clear favourite in the Brownlow Medal, but suffered a knee injury (torn posterior cruciate ligament) in Round 20 against Essendon in front of 91,000 fans; he held the equal-lead in the Brownlow count at the time of his injury, but unable to poll votes in the final three games, he ultimately finished fourth. He would also fail to win Carlton's best and fairest, that prize shared between Brett Ratten and Scott Camporeale, but he won the prestigious AFLPA MVP Award (now known as the Leigh Matthews Trophy), and would gain All-Australian selection for the second time; his knee injury would prevent him from taking part in the International Rules series.

Koutoufides' PCL injury was healed before the start of 2001, and he had another stellar season, finally winning his first club best and fairest. However, in the semi-final against Richmond, he again sustained a knee injury, this time a very serious torn anterior cruciate ligament. He would not play again until Round 15, 2002, playing only three games in that year and wearing a specially designed game-day knee brace. Koutoufides' capacity to jump was severely limited for the following years. Carlton's poor season was put down to his long-term injury.

Following the retirement of Andrew McKay, Koutoufides was made the captain of the team in 2004, a position he held until 2006. As captain, Koutoufides won his second best and fairest in 2005, once again a key figure in Carlton's midfield. In 2007, he handed the captaincy to Lance Whitnall.

== Retirement ==
Koutoufides announced his retirement from AFL football on 31 July 2007. The decision was made following a hip injury that he suffered against St Kilda in Round 17, 2007 which was discovered to be more severe than first expected. In Round 18, 2007, Carlton vs Collingwood game, he had a lap of honour and a standing ovation before the match from the Carlton players and the supporters. Having played 278 games, Koutoufides is eighth all-time on Carlton's list. Despite the usual practice of players changing to lower numbers after their junior seasons, Koutoufides wore the No. 43 guernsey through the prime of his career, and holds VFL/AFL record for games in that number.

Koutoufides was selected in both the Italian and the Greek teams of the century, in the latter of which he was named a vice-captain. He is a life-member of the Carlton Football Club. Furthermore, having played a total of 305 games (278 regular season games, 26 pre-season games, 1 State of Origin game), he is a life-member of the AFL. In 2014, he was inducted into the Australian Football Hall of Fame.

== Memorable performances ==
Standing out amongst Koutoufides' career are two particularly memorable performances. In Round 5, 1996, against West Coast at Subiaco Oval, Koutoufides dominated on the wing. He took his career-high 18 marks, including the final game-saving mark which kept the Blues ahead by one point. It was included in the "Memorable Moments" competition for the Subiaco Oval farewell.

The second was his final quarter against Essendon in the 1999 preliminary final. In the final quarter, Koutoufides moved into the midfield, and drifted forward and back, to finish with ten kicks and six marks, generating four clearances, three rebounds and two goals, helping the Blues to come from 11 points behind to famously beat the heavily favoured Bombers by one point. The performance was described by club legend (and later, president) Stephen Kernahan as "the greatest quarter of football ever played".

== Controversy ==
Through the mid-1990s, Koutoufides was hot property, becoming a pin-up boy for the club, appearing in the Men For All Seasons calendar on numerous occasions and being an AFL face of Nike and Adidas in the mid-1990s. Competition between those rival companies for boots sponsorship caused a particular controversy in 1997, with Koutoufides having an individual adidas sponsorship, and Carlton having a team Nike sponsorship. The "Kouta's Boots" scandal nearly resulted in Koutoufides missing games unless he could fulfil his own endorsement contract, but the issue was resolved before any such action was taken.

There was criticism that, in later years, Koutoufides did not deserve his $1 million contract, as he missed a vast number of matches due to injuries to his knee, hamstring and hand. However, much of Koutoufides' salary during the height of his career was deferred to later contracts for salary cap reasons.

== Playing statistics ==
Legend
G	Goals	K	Kicks	D	Disposals	T	Tackles
B	Behinds	H	Handballs	M	Marks

Season	Team	No.	Games	Totals							Averages (per game)						
Season	Team	No.	Games	G	B	K	H	D	M	T	G	B	K	H	D	M	T
1992	Carlton	43	6	1	1	49	27	76	13	1	0.2	0.2	8.2	4.5	12.7	2.2	0.2
1993	Carlton	43	8	2	5	68	48	116	19	13	0.3	0.6	8.5	6.0	14.5	2.4	1.6
1994	Carlton	43	22	6	10	222	107	329	62	26	0.3	0.5	10.1	4.9	15.0	2.8	1.2
1995	Carlton	43	25	22	13	294	216	510	128	50	0.9	0.5	11.8	8.6	20.4	5.1	2.0
1996	Carlton	43	24	24	15	318	201	519	145	36	1.0	0.6	13.3	8.4	21.6	6.0	1.5
1997	Carlton	43	22	28	32	270	156	426	95	20	1.3	1.5	12.3	7.1	19.4	4.3	0.9
1998	Carlton	43	21	11	12	225	126	351	95	23	0.5	0.6	10.7	6.0	16.7	4.5	1.1
1999	Carlton	43	20	9	5	236	164	400	116	19	0.5	0.3	11.8	8.2	20.0	5.8	1.0
2000	Carlton	43	20	36	19	282	239	521	127	40	1.8	1.0	14.1	12.0	26.1	6.4	2.0
2001	Carlton	43	22	32	20	271	238	509	126	62	1.5	0.9	12.3	10.8	23.1	5.7	2.8
2002	Carlton	43	3	3	0	14	14	28	7	4	1.0	0.0	4.7	4.7	9.3	2.3	1.3
2003	Carlton	43	22	6	7	234	234	468	55	77	0.3	0.3	10.6	10.6	21.3	2.5	3.5
2004	Carlton	43	12	15	10	109	86	195	43	43	1.3	0.8	9.1	7.2	16.3	3.6	3.6
2005	Carlton	43	22	13	11	223	205	428	75	62	0.6	0.5	10.1	9.3	19.5	3.4	2.8
2006	Carlton	43	18	12	14	169	172	341	89	65	0.7	0.8	9.4	9.6	18.9	4.9	3.6
2007	Carlton	43	11	6	2	81	97	178	29	27	0.5	0.2	7.4	8.8	16.2	2.6	2.5
Career			278	226	176	3065	2330	5395	1224	568	0.8	0.6	11.0	8.4	19.4	4.4	2.0

== Honours and achievements ==
**Brownlow Medal votes**
Season	Votes
1992	1
1993	—
1994	3
1995	12
1996	12
1997	6
1998	—
1999	6
2000	19
2001	8
2002	—
2003	5
2004	5
2005	5
2006	—
2007	—
**Total**	**82**
Key:
Green / **Bold** = Won

- **Team**
  - AFL Premiership (Carlton): 1995
  - McClelland Trophy (Carlton): 1995
  - Pre-Season Cup (Carlton): 1997, 2005, 2007
- **Individual**
  - Leigh Matthews Trophy (AFLPA MVP Award): 2000
  - All-Australian: 1995, 2000
  - Australian Football Media Association Player of the Year Award: 2000
  - Robert Reynolds Trophy/John Nicholls Medal (Carlton F.C. Best & Fairest): 2001, 2005
  - Carlton F.C. Leading Club Goalkicker Award: 1997
  - Carlton F.C. Captain: 2004–2006
  - Victorian Representative Honours: 1999
  - **Carlton F.C. Life-Member**
  - **AFL Life-Member**
  - **Greek Team of the Century – Centre (VC)**
  - **Italian Team of the Century – Centre Half-Back**
  - Australian Football Hall of Fame inductee: 2014

== Political attempts ==
Koutoufides was a Lord Mayor candidate in the 2024 Melbourne City Council election. He was unsuccessful, coming fourth place with 14.17% of the primary vote.

Koutoufides stood in the 2025 Australian federal election, as an independent in the Division of Melbourne. He polled 3.29% of the vote, with the seat ultimately being won by Labor's Sarah Witty.

== Personal life ==
In October 2002, Koutoufides married Susie Angeloski. They have two sons and a daughter.

On 28 November 2006, Koutoufides won the fifth season of the Seven Network's Dancing with the Stars.

In 2008, Koutoufides played "Kouta the Greek God" in the Seven Network's revival of Gladiators. On the show he was usually referred to as "Kouta, a Gladiator touched by the gods".

Koutoufides owned the Souvlaki Hut restaurant in Templestowe Lower with former Carlton teammate Ang Christou and became the advertising face for the franchise until its closure in early 2011.
