= Arron Wood =

Australian environmentalaist

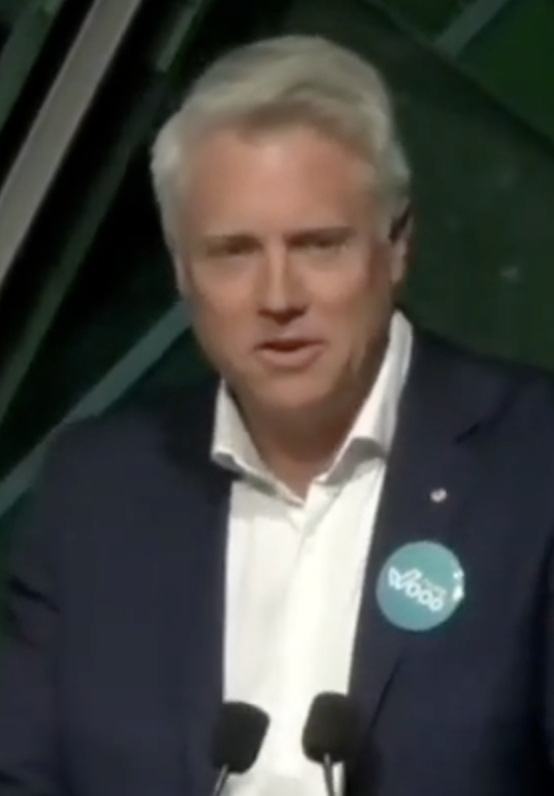
Arron Wood in 2024.

Arron Wood AM is an Australian environmentalist, consultant and previously Deputy Lord Mayor and Acting Lord Mayor of the City of Melbourne. Wood, a graduate of the University of Melbourne with a degree in forest science, was the youngest appointed Governor of University College (University of Melbourne). He founded and runs Kids Teaching Kids program to educate students about environmental issues.

In 2012, Wood was first elected to Melbourne City Council. Cr Wood was Chair of the Finance and Governance portfolio. He sits on the Victorian Adaptation & Sustainability Partnership Ministerial Advisory Committee, the Parks and Gardens Advisory Committee, the Yarra Park Advisory Committee and was a board member of Sustainability Victoria and the South East Water Authority.

Wood stood for election as Lord Mayor in 2020 but was unsuccessful. Sally Capp was returned as Lord Mayor.

Wood ran again as a Lord Mayor candidate in the 2024 Melbourne City Council election, however was unsuccessful.

== Career ==
In 2001, Wood was chosen as the Australian representative for the 25 most inspirational 25-year-olds from around the world as profiled in L'actualité, the French-Canadian magazine. That same year, he was appointed as an ambassador for National Youth Week, and declared the Young Australian of the Year in the National Environment category. The following year, he taught at Deakin University, where he hosted a series of guest lectures.

In 2003, Wood received The Centenary Medal for outstanding contributions in support of conservation and the environment, as awarded by the Governor-General. He also hosted his own fortnightly regional ABC radio program on the environment and a monthly broadcast on ABC Radio National, discussing rural issues. The following year, Wood covered on Australian Story, a television magazine program. The following year, he hosted the Channel Seven documentary entitled "Our Water, Our Future".

In addition to winning the 2006 United Nations Individual Award for Outstanding Service to the Environment, Wood was awarded the 2007 Prime Minister's Australian Environmentalist of the Year.

Wood has appeared on Network TEN's Totally Wild, and Channel 7's Sunrise and Saturday Disney. Wood's first book Inspiring the Next Young Environmental Leader – Kids Teaching Kids: Addressing Our Environment Crisis has sold 5,000 copies and was translated into Korean for distribution throughout the Korean school system. In 2011 Wood released his auto biography, "Billabong Boy".

Wood has been named on WME Magazine's 2012 Leaders List and appointed as the youngest Governor of University College (The University of Melbourne). He appeared fortnightly for years on Network TEN's morning show 9am with David and Kim and The Circle, presenting a popular segment on all things environmental. Named in the top ten education leaders nationally in 2009 as part of The Weekend Australian Magazine, he is a Member of the Future Melbourne Reference Committee which decided the vision for Melbourne over the next 10 years.

He is a former Clean Up the World Ambassador with David De Rothschild and Celine Cousteau and was named one of Friday Magazine's Most Inspirational People for 2003, which also included Steve Irwin and Troy Cassar-Daley. He is also a previous Member of the National Council on Education for Sustainability and was selected to complete Al Gore's Climate Change Leadership Program.

== Personal life ==
Wood was born in Mildura, Victoria.

In 2012, Wood married advertising executive Stephanie Dunstan, and they have 2 children.

Wood wrote a memoir, 'Billabong Boy', which outlines a period of depression and anxiety in his mid-twenties and his subsequent recovery.

== Honours & awards ==
- Member of the Order of Australia (AM) for significant contribution to local government, the environment and the community (2020)
- 2001 Young Australian of the Year (National Environment Winner)
- 2006 United Nations Individual Award for Outstanding Service to the Environment
- 2007 Melbourne Business Award for Contribution to the Environment
- 2007 Prime Minister's Environmentalist of the Year
- 2012 Telstra News Ltd Micro Business of the Year (Victorian State Winner)
- The Centenary Medal for outstanding contribution to conservation and the environment, awarded by the Governor-General
