= Sally Capp =

Australian politician

Sally Capp AO
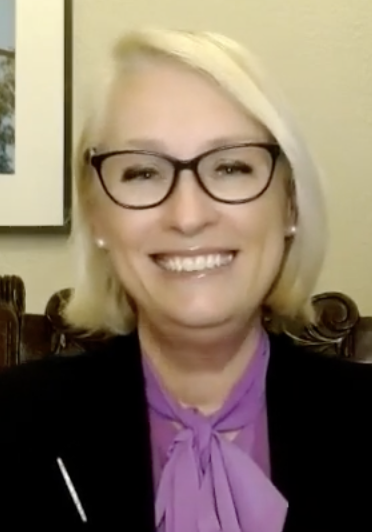
- Speaking at the World Economic Forum's Sustainable Development Impact Summit 2021

104th Lord Mayor of Melbourne Elections: 2018, 2020
- In office 26 May 2018 – 2 July 2024
- Deputy: Nicholas Reece
- Preceded by: Robert Doyle
- Succeeded by: Nicholas Reece

Personal details
- Born: 1967 (age 58–59) Port Moresby, Papua New Guinea
- Party: Team Sally Capp
- Other political affiliations: Liberal (2014–2016)
- Spouse: Andrew Sutherland

Sally Anne Capp AO (born 1967) is a former Australian politician who was the 104th lord mayor of Melbourne, elected on 18 May 2018 and sworn in on 26 May 2018 with her term ending on 30 June 2024. She is also the former executive director of the development lobbying group the Property Council of Victoria.

== Life and career ==
Capp was educated at Presbyterian Ladies' College before graduating with honours in economics and law from the University of Melbourne. Her first career was a solicitor.

Previously Capp was chief of operations of the Victorian Employers Chamber of Commerce and the former Victoria agent-general in London from 2009 to 2012, the first woman to hold the office.

Capp is the former CEO of the Committee for Melbourne and was a director of Collingwood Football Club to 2009, the first woman to serve on the board of that club.

On 18 May 2018, Capp was declared elected as lord mayor of Melbourne in the 2018 by-election for lord mayor, following the resignation of Robert Doyle on 4 February. She was sworn in on 24 May.

Capp was re-elected as lord mayor in November 2020, securing another four-year term.

In 2022, Capp supported calls to change the date of Australia Day.

On 25 November 2022, Capp was criticised for saying that COVID-19 lockdowns were "good" for the City of Melbourne.

Capp was appointed an Officer of the Order of Australia (AO) in the 2023 King's Birthday Honours for "distinguished service to the people of Melbourne, to local government, to business, and to the community through various organisations".

In 2023, Capp was appointed to the federal government's Urban Policy Forum.

On 28 March 2024, Capp officially announced that she would not seek re-election and would stand down as Lord Mayor at the end of June, stating "Look it's with mixed emotions, but it's important for me, that I'm open and create as much certainty as I can is [sic] there been much conjecture I've decided not to contest the local government elections later this year, I absolutely love being the Lord Mayor of Melbourne, it's been a tumultuous, and tremendous six years, the trajectory now is so positive and I think it's the right time for me to go."

Capp and her husband Andrew Sutherland have two sons.

Civic offices
Preceded by Robert Doyle	Lord Mayor of Melbourne; 2018–2024	Succeeded by Nicholas Reece
