= James Milne Wilson =

Australian politician (1812–1880)

Sir James Milne Wilson KCMG
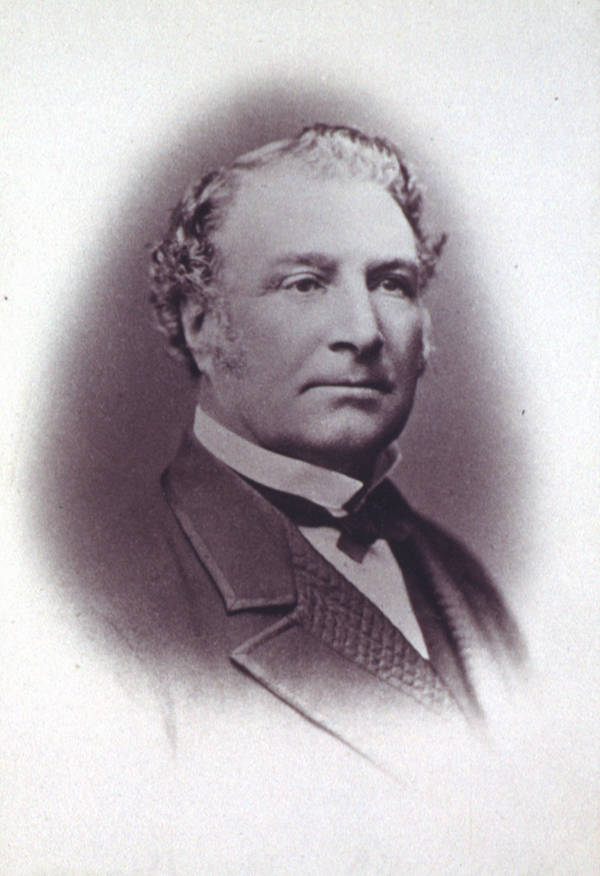

8th Premier of Tasmania
- In office 4 August 1869 – 4 November 1872
- Preceded by: Sir Richard Dry
- Succeeded by: Frederick Innes

Personal details
- Born: 29 February 1812 Banff, Scotland
- Died: 29 February 1880 (aged 68) Hobart Town, Tasmania

Sir James Milne Wilson KCMG (29 February 1812 – 29 February 1880) was a colonial Australian politician who served as premier of Tasmania from 1869 to 1872.

In an extremely rare coincidence, he was born on 29 February (making him a leapling) and died on the same date at the age of 68.

== Early life ==
Wilson was born on 29 February 1812 in Banff, Scotland. He was the son of Barbara (née Grey) and John Wilson. His father was a ship's captain who came from a prominent Scottish family of merchants and shipowners.

Wilson arrived in Van Diemen's Land in 1829, where his older brother William Wilson had sailed several times as captain of the brig Deveron. He subsequently worked in the engineering and shipping industries.

== Politics ==
On 18 October 1859, Wilson was elected to the seat of Hobart in the Tasmanian Legislative Council in on 18 October 1859. He would retain the seat until his death in 1880.

Wilson was a minister without portfolio in James Whyte's government from 1863 to 1866. He attended an intercolonial conference on lighthouses in Melbourne in 1864 and was also a member of two inquiries into railways in Tasmania, including the eventual Western Line and Main Line.

Wilson served as mayor of Hobart from 1868 to 1869 and in that capacity welcomed Prince Alfred, Duke of Edinburgh, the first member of the British royal family to visit Australia. He was appointed premier and colonial secretary on 4 August 1869, replacing Richard Dry.

== Personal life ==
In 1847, Wilson married Deborah Hope Degraves, the daughter of Cascade Brewery founder Peter Degraves.

Political offices
Preceded by Sir Richard Dry	Premier of Tasmania; 1869–1872	Succeeded by Frederick Innes
Tasmanian Legislative Council
Preceded by Frederick Innes	President of the Tasmanian Legislative Council; 1872–1880	Succeeded by Frederick Innes
Preceded by John Walker	Member for Hobart; 1859–1880; Served alongside: Carter/Kennerley/Agnew, Horne/Wedge/Fysh/Crowther	Succeeded by Alexander McGregor
