= Frederick Innes =

Australian politician

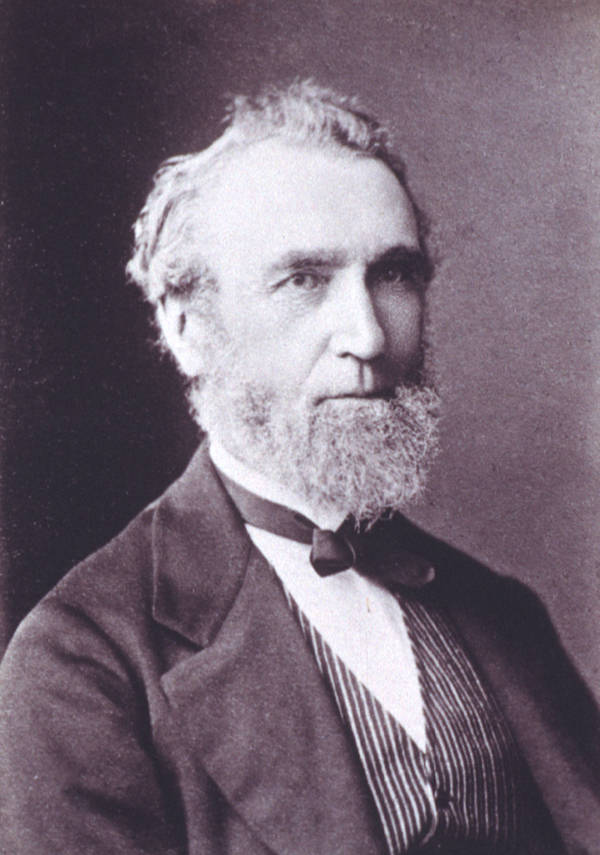

9th Premier of Tasmania
- In office 4 November 1872 – 4 August 1873
- Preceded by: James Milne Wilson
- Succeeded by: Alfred Kennerley

Personal details
- Born: 11 August 1816 Edinburgh, Scotland, UK
- Died: 11 May 1882 (aged 65) Launceston, Tasmania
- Spouse: Sarah Grey (m. 1838)
- Occupation: Journalist

Frederick Maitland Innes (11 August 1816 – 11 May 1882) was an Australian politician and journalist. He was premier of Tasmania from 1872 to 1873.

== Early life ==
Innes was born on 11 August 1816 in Edinburgh, Scotland. He was the son of Prudence (née Edgerley) and Francis Innes.

Innes was educated at George Heriot's School and Kelso Grammar School. After leaving school he began working for his uncle, a manager of the estates of James Innes-Ker, 6th Duke of Roxburghe. He left Scotland in 1836 and arrived in Van Diemen's Land the following year, settling in Hobart Town.

== Journalism and political views ==
After his arrival in the colony Innes worked on the staff of The Hobart Town Courier and the Tasmanian. He was active in the revival of the Hobart Town Mechanics' Institute and supported the expansion of education, including the creation of a university. He also supported Alexander Maconochie's prison reform efforts. He returned to England in 1839 and became secretary of the Aborigines' Protection Society.

In 1843, Innes returned to Hobart aboard Mandarin, acting as a superintendent for the Parkhurst apprentices. After a period on the Courier he became editor of the Observer in 1845, then the following year moved to Launceston and joined The Cornwall Chronicle.

== Parliamentary politics ==
Innes became an inaugural member of the Tasmanian House of Assembly in 1856, winning the seat of Morven. He resigned in 1862 to transfer to the Legislative Council seat of South Esk.

Innes was colonial treasurer from 1857 to 1862 and was closely associated with Francis Villeneuve Smith and William Henty.

== Personal life ==
In 1838, Innes married Sarah Elizabeth Grey, the daughter of a free settler from Ireland. He died in Launceston on 11 May 1882, aged 65, survived by seven sons and five daughters.

Political offices
Preceded by James Milne Wilson	Premier of Tasmania; 1872–1873	Succeeded by Alfred Kennerley
Tasmanian Legislative Council
Preceded by William Nairn	President of the Tasmanian Legislative Council; 1868–1872	Succeeded by James Wilson
Preceded by Sir James Wilson	President of the Tasmanian Legislative Council; 1880–1882	Succeeded by Thomas Chapman
Preceded by Philip Gell	Member for South Esk; 1862–1872	Succeeded by James Scott
Preceded by James Scott	Member for South Esk; 1877–1882	Succeeded by Charles Leake
