= Hobart Zoo =

Tasmania, Australia Zoo (1923–1937)

Hobart Zoo (also "Beaumaris Zoo")
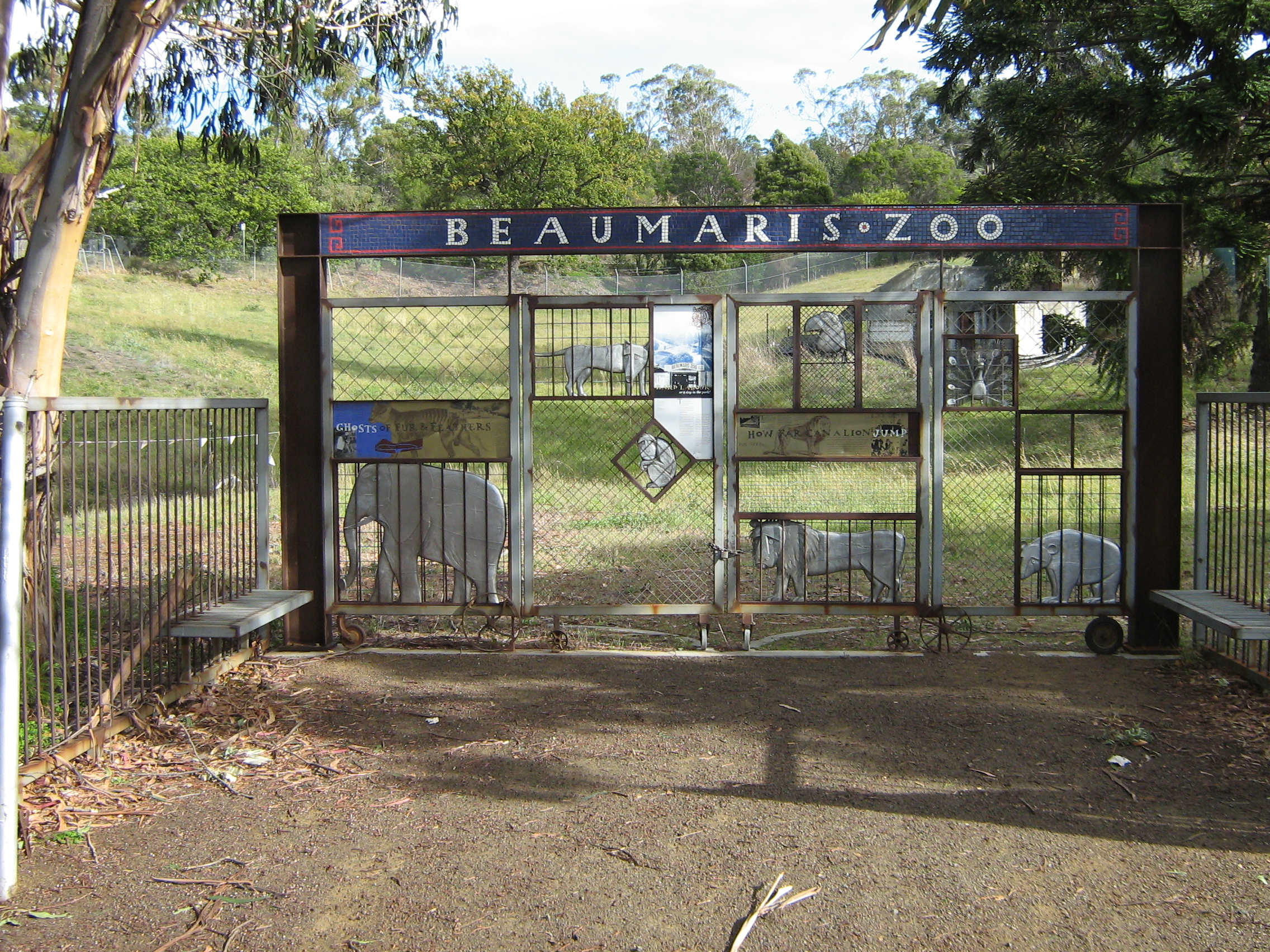
- The gates to the old Beaumaris Zoo site. Some of the remains of the original zoo can be seen in the background on the right.
- Interactive map of Hobart Zoo (also "Beaumaris Zoo")
- 42°52′14″S 147°19′57″E
- Date opened: 1895 (as Beaumaris Zoo); 1923 (at the quarry site)
- Date closed: 1937
- Location: Hobart, Tasmania, Australia
- Land area: 2 ha (4.9 acres)

Hobart Zoo (also known as Beaumaris Zoo) was an old-fashioned zoological garden located on the Queen's Domain in Hobart, Tasmania, Australia. The zoo site is very close to the site of the Tasmanian Governor's House, and the Botanical Gardens. Although its location became primarily the site of a Hobart City Council depot, some remnants and archaeological remains of the original zoo can still be seen.

The zoo was set in the surrounds of sweeping gardens, and had commanding views across the River Derwent.

== Thylacines ==
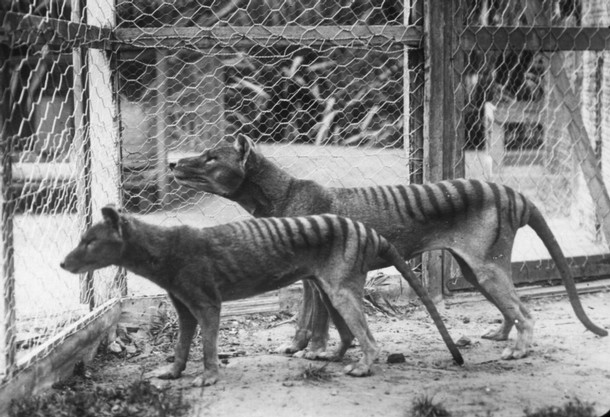
Two male Thylacines at the Hobart Zoo in 1911 (the adult male is larger than the juvenile male in front)

The Hobart Zoo is most famous as the place where footage of the last known living Tasmanian tiger (thylacine) was taken in 1936. It died in captivity of exposure, due to suspected neglect after being locked out of its sleeping enclosure on 7 September 1936. National Threatened Species Day has been held annually since 1996 on 7 September in Australia, to commemorate the death of the last officially recorded thylacine.

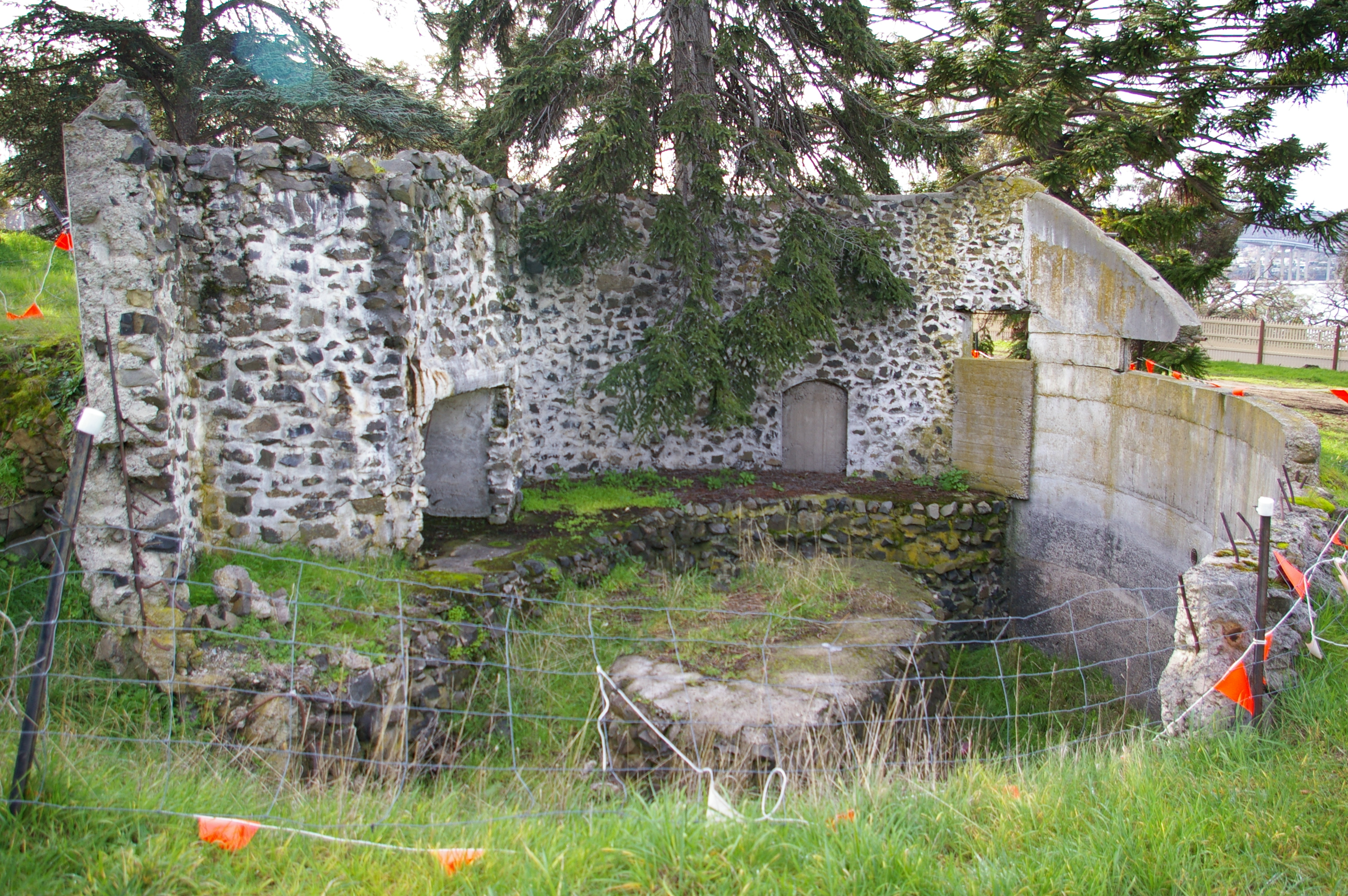
The ruins of the concrete polar bear enclosure at Beaumaris Zoo. On the other side is the remains of a leopard exhibit.

== History ==
The zoo was originally called Beaumaris Zoo, and was opened in 1895 at the private residence "Beaumaris" of Hobart socialite Mary Grant Roberts. Mrs. Roberts owned and operated the zoo from 1895 until her death in 1921. This zoo, which included a breeding programme for Tasmanian devils, rehabilitated the image of native animals and attracted scientific interest in them.

=== 1922 ===
After Mrs Robert's death, the family offered the Beaumaris zoological collection to the Hobart City Council, which accepted the offer in January 1922 on condition that the Tasmanian State Government give a subsidy towards the zoo. A subsidy of £250 per annum was approved on 10 February 1922 by the Tasmanian State Government and appropriated for the new zoo.

In March 1922, the Hobart City Council advertised for a curator to care for the Beaumaris zoological collection still housed on the Roberts property. On the evening of 27 March the Hobart City Council Reserves Committee held a meeting to consider the applicants for the curator's position. Arthur Reid was appointed as curator of the not yet constructed municipal zoological gardens.

Arthur Reid, the new curator who had been born in Edinburgh, Scotland, had emigrated to Tasmania at the age of 21, and had been an avid naturalist since boyhood. When he came to Tasmania, Reid took a special interest in the rearing of pheasants and English birds. Reid died aged 70 years on 13 December 1935.

On 30 May 1922, Reid left for an 18-day tour of Australian zoos, including Taronga Park Zoo, Melbourne Zoo and a zoo in Ballarat. Reid was tasked to inspect the various enclosure designs, zoological collections, and gain experience in the management methods of these facilities. On his return, he was to advise the Reserves Committee of his findings. Reid also intended to arrange the exchange of birds and animals with these zoos. Tenders had been issued in May for the construction of a boundary fence to surround the chosen site for the new zoological gardens. On return, Reid was also tasked with overseeing the transfer of the Roberts collection to the new site, once the enclosures were completed.

The original Roberts collection had suffered losses during the time between the death of Mrs Roberts and the acquisition of the collection by the Hobart City Council. The Tasmanian devils that had been at the forefront of the Beaumaris collection no longer existed. Only one thylacine was noted, in ill health but recovering under Reid's care. A new pair of Tasmanian devils had been promised to replace those that had died. Other animals listed including wallabies, kangaroos, possums as well as various species of birds were all reported in the best of health.

In July the Reserves Committee received a report from Curator Reid, after an article in the Illustrated Tasmanian Mail (22 June 1922) alleged poor animal welfare amongst those housed at the Roberts property at Battery Point. Reid reported that the Tasmanian devils had been disposed of before the Hobart City Council had received the collection. He also advised that an aged wallaby had died, and the 'wolf' (referring to the thylacine) had not had a mate for over two years. No wombats were in the collection, and a squirrel had not had a mate for 18 months. He had also destroyed what was termed as a 'native cat' (quoll). 48 animals were counted in the collection on 19 April 1922, with further additions bringing the total to 54 animals. Reid reported to the Reserves Committee that 100 birds were also in the collection.

During late August a large wedgetail eagle, caught in a rabbit trap, was captured in Pyengana, Tasmania by a representative of the Nestlé Milk Company. The bird of prey was sent to Hobart for addition to the zoo, where it was cared for by curator Reid.

In September members of the public gave the new zoo a pair of Tasmanian devils, as well as black and grey possums.

By early October, the boundary fence around the zoo site had been completed, workmen were putting finishing touches to the large pond which would house the collection of water birds, and the animal enclosures, aviaries and runs were nearing completion. Some construction was slowed due to a delayed supply of wire netting from Sydney. A pair of African lions were donated by the Taronga Park Zoo. An echidna, wallabies, possums, eagles and more Tasmanian devils were also donated by members of the public and added to the collection still housed at Battery Point. During mid-October the sole remaining thylacine from the Roberts collection died of pneumonia. Its remains were sent to be preserved for future display.

With its loss, the Hobart City Council sent an appeal to the public for another live specimen for the zoo. Tenders had been received for the construction of the curator's office, a tea kiosk and other buildings.

Through the month of November the construction of the zoo was nearing completion. The site was fully enclosed by the new boundary fence, aviaries and enclosures were almost finished. Accommodation was being readied for a long list of animals and birds, including deer, emu, ostrich, and peafowl. A terraced enclosure for the African lions had been started with cuts made into the sandstone hill. The plan was to have the enclosure viewable from both above and below, with a moat at the front, and concrete walls on the sides, some 40 feet wide with a den area attached. A large figure of eight pond was featured on the site, 300 feet in circumference for the aquatic birds, and an arched bridge for the pond was also in the planning stages. Trees, shrubs and flower beds were being planted around the site. The Reserves Committee had accepted tenders for the construction of an office and store. Provision had yet to be made for a tea house and public lavatory.

On 29 November the Tasmanian Legislative Council approved a clause in the Hobart Corporation Bill for the Hobart City Council to "...establish and maintain zoological gardens to be known as the Beaumaris Zoo in such portion of the Queen's Domain as it may determine, and also to expend on the zoo such annual sum as the Council may think proper."

=== 1923 ===
By the end of January 1923 the zoo was ready to open. The animals were transferred from the old Beaumaris property at Battery Point, to the new zoological facility by the Hobart City Council at the rehabilitated quarry site at the Queen's Domain, on 1 February 1923. An aged kangaroo, however, died shortly after arriving at the Queen's Domain site. The African lions, due from Taronga Park Zoo, did not arrive in time for the opening on 2 February.

The official opening ceremony took place on Friday afternoon of 2 February 1923, officiated by Alderman Williams in the absence of the mayor, Alderman McKenzie. Ida Roberts, the daughter of Mary Grant Roberts who had donated the Beaumaris zoological collection to the Hobart City Council, was present at the opening of the new Beaumaris Zoological Gardens. The zoo held at its opening 100 animals and 220 birds.

On opening day the two Tasmanian devils that had been given to the zoo escaped their enclosure, and were later found hiding under a culvert. Despite efforts to recapture them the marsupials eluded zoo staff. The animals were recaptured on 17 February after Curator Reid built a box trap baited with lambs heart, and left it near the culvert where the pair had been hiding.

The gate that secures the site since 9 September 2000 (World Threatened Species Day) was designed to communicate the history of the zoo to the passing public and secure the site. It won an award in 2001 for landscape design from the Australian Institute of Landscape Architects.

== Closure and fate ==
The zoo closed in 1937 due to severe financial problems. The site was acquired by the Royal Australian Navy and converted into a fuel storage depot for the nearby HMAS Huon shore base. The Navy used the site from 1943 until 1991, when it reverted to the Hobart City Council and was used as a storage depot.

A conservation plan was published in 1967 as The Beaumaris zoo site conservation plan. Proposals as late as 2003 for future uses of the site included a sculpture park for Tasmanian artists and a wildlife rehabilitation centre. A plan to build a new zoo had been in mind for a few years.
