= Growing our Future, Growing the NBN =

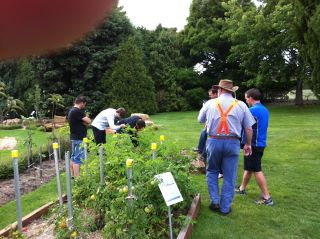
Facilitators and teachers meeting for a PD day in early 2012

Growing our Future, Growing the NBN is a Tasmanian project funded under the National Broadband Network (NBN) funding round one, which aims to deliver horticulture training to students from around Tasmania. This project is an initiative of a partnership of The Royal Tasmanian Botanical Gardens, GlobalNet ICT, Independent Schools Tasmania and Grosvenor Consultants.

The pilot program includes three schools, Circular Head Christian School in Smithton, Geneva Christian College in Latrobe and Hilliard Christian School in West Moonah. The hope is that as the program grows, more schools and community organisations can become part of the courses.

The Growing our Future, Growing the NBN project is utilising the NBN's high-speed Internet to facilitate live-streaming of class content, both synchronously and a-synchronously. There will also be supporting course content available online.

The Growing our Future, Growing the NBN project was the subject of an article in the TasCountry Newspaper in February 2012.
