= Attorney General Horne =

Attorney General Horne may refer to:

- Thomas Horne (politician) (1800–1870), Attorney-General of Tasmania
- Tom Horne (born 1945), Attorney General of Arizona
- William Horne (Liberal politician) (1774–1860), Attorney General for England and Wales
