= Doone Kennedy Hobart Aquatic Centre =

Aquatic sporting facility in Hobart, Australia

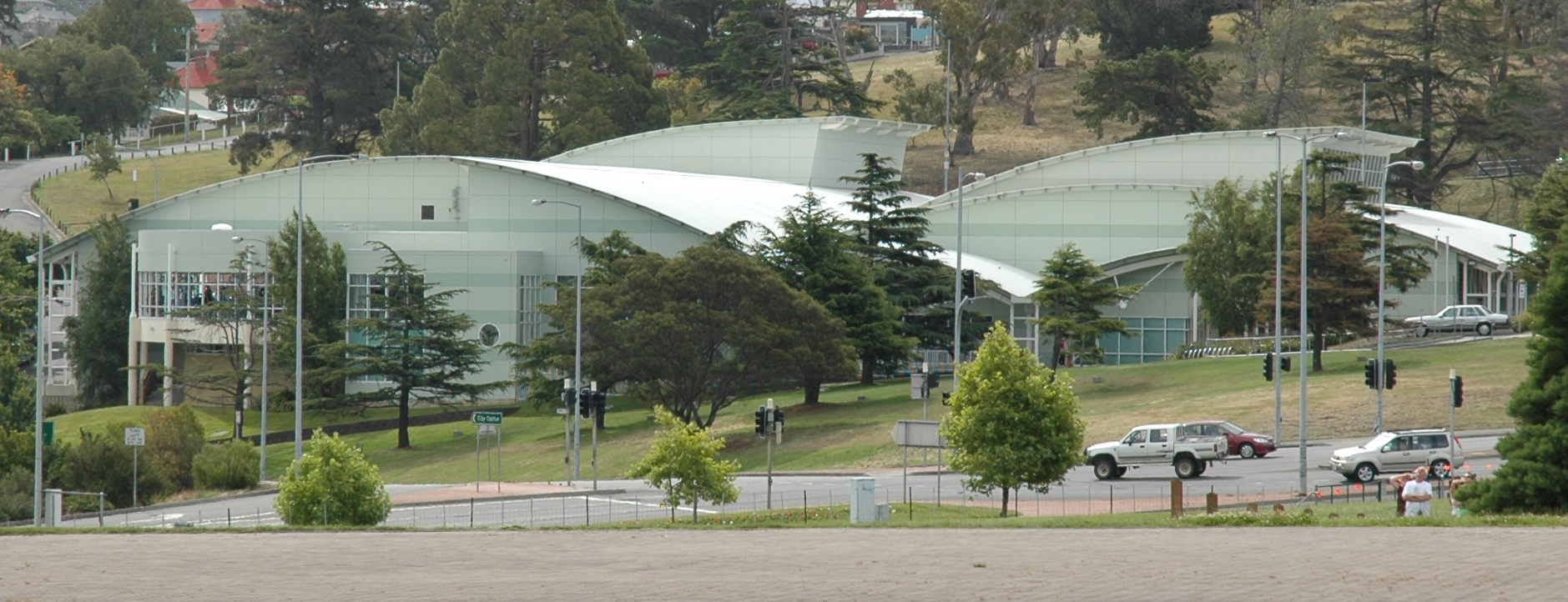
- Doone Kennedy Hobart Aquatic Centre
- Interactive map of Doone Kennedy Hobart Aquatic Centre
- Location: Queens Domain, Hobart, Tasmania, Australia
- Coordinates: 42°52′34″S 147°19′55″E
- Owner: City of Hobart

Construction
- Groundbreaking: April 1995
- Opened: 1997
- Cost: $17 million

Tenants
- Various Tasmanian swimming, diving, and water polo clubs 1999 Australian Canoe Polo Championships; 1999/2000 FINA Swimming World Cup; 2000 Underwater Hockey World Championships; 2001 Australian Swimming Championships; 2003 Australian Short Course Swimming Championships; 2009 Australian Short Course Swimming Championships; 2017 Junior Underwater Hockey World Championships

Website
- Official website

The Doone Kennedy Hobart Aquatic Centre is an aquatic sporting facility located in the Queens Domain, less than 1 km (0.62 mi) from the Hobart central business district in Tasmania, Australia. The venue has hosted various national and international events, including the Australian Swimming Championships, the Tasmanian Swimming Championships, the FINA Swimming World Cup, the Pan Pacific Games, and the Qantas Skins. Other major events held at the venue in its early years include the Australian Canoe Polo Championships, the Australian Diving Championships, Australian Water Polo under-age and national league events, and the World and Australian Underwater Hockey Championships.

== History ==
The centre was developed under the leadership of Doone Kennedy during her tenure as Lord Mayor of Hobart from 1986 to 1996. It was built to provide a high-quality aquatic and recreational facility for both professional athletes and the general public.

The facility was officially renamed the Doone Kennedy Hobart Aquatic Centre on 18 October 2015, marking the 19th anniversary of its construction. The renaming was in honour of Doone Kennedy's significant contributions to Hobart, particularly her role in advocating for the construction of the centre.

== Facilities ==
The Doone Kennedy Hobart Aquatic Centre is a fully indoor facility featuring:

- A 50 m (160 ft) Olympic-size competition pool with 8 lanes
- A 25 m (82 ft) warm-up and leisure pool
- A 25 m × 20 m (82 ft × 66 ft) diving pool
- A diving tower with 10 m (33 ft), 7.5 m (25 ft), and 5 m (16 ft) platforms, as well as 1 m (3 ft 3 in) and 3 m (9.8 ft) springboards
- Additional amenities include a gymnasium, a café, and a crèche.

== Operations and activities ==
The centre is open year-round and offers a variety of sporting and recreational activities, including:

- Competitive swimming
- Water polo
- Diving
- Learn-to-swim programs
- Yoga classes
- Aerobics
- Circuit and weight training

The facility provides views of the River Derwent, Mount Wellington, and the city.

== See also ==
List of sports venues named after individuals

List of swimming pools

Sport in Tasmania
