= Doone Kennedy =

Australian politician and civic leader

Doone Kennedy AO

67th Lord Mayor of Hobart
- In office 1986–1996
- Preceded by: Brian Broadby
- Succeeded by: John Freeman

Personal details
- Born: Lorna Doone Pleasance Brewer; 10 May 1927 New South Wales, Australia
- Died: 30 August 2014 (aged 87) Hobart, Tasmania, Australia
- Spouse: John Kennedy

Lorna Doone Pleasance Kennedy AO (10 May 1927 – 30 August 2014) was an Australian politician and civic leader who served as the Lord Mayor of Hobart, the capital of Tasmania, from 1986 until 1996. Kennedy was the first woman to be elected Lord Mayor of Hobart and remained the city's only female mayor until the election of Sue Hickey in 2014.

== Early and personal life ==
Kennedy was born Lorna Doone Pleasance Brewer on 10 May 1927. She was raised on a New South Wales sheep farm. Brewer dropped out of school when she was 16 years old to find work following the outbreak of World War II. She was hired by the Bank of New South Wales in 1944, which transferred her twice, first to Sydney and then to Hobart, where she arrived in April 1947 at the age of 19. She soon met John Kennedy, her future husband, who was fifteen years older than her. John Kennedy had been an Australian POW who was forced to work on the Burma Railway by the Japanese during World War II. The couple married in 1949 and had two children. John Kennedy later served as an alderman on the Hobart City Council from 1970 until 1982. He once ran for Lord Mayor himself, but lost the election.

== Political career ==
Doone Kennedy was first elected to the Hobart City Council in 1982, the same year that her husband left office. She served as a city alderman from 1982 until her election as Lord Mayor in 1986.

Kennedy focused on philanthropic organizations once she entered politics. By 1986, the year of her election as Lord Mayor, Kennedy had served as a president or board member of numerous organizations, including the Asthma Foundation, the Hobart District Nursing Service, Greening of Australia, the Mary Ogilvy Home Society, the board of Queen Alexandra Hospital, the Narryna Heritage Museum, the trustees of the Tasmanian Museum and Art Gallery, Southern Regional Ambulance Service Advisory Council, and the Sudden Infant Death Society.

in 1986, Doone Kennedy announced her candidacy for Lord Mayor of Hobart. (In a mayoral flyer distributed at the time, Kennedy "offers" herself as a candidate). Kennedy campaigned on a platform of city beautification, the preservation of Queens Domain as an open space, and pro-business policies. She wrote at the time, "We need to beautify our carparks—eliminate every possible ugliness... Add to the beauty of our streets by stepping up our tree-planting program and general beautification."

Doone Kennedy was elected Lord Mayor in 1986, becoming the first woman to hold the office. She championed beautification programs and city development throughout her five consecutive, elected terms as Lord Mayor. Kennedy promoted Hobart as both a commercial hub and a destination for tourism. Lord Mayor Kennedy secured funding for the Hobart Aquatic Centre. She instigated tree planting programs, construction and renovations of Soundy Park in North Hobart and the Lord Mayor's Garden, located next to Hobart Town Hall. Under Kennedy, lighting was installed to illuminate the trees of Salamanca Place. Landmark chandeliers were also added to the ballroom of the Hobart Town Hall.

Kennedy remained very popular during her ten-year reign as Lord Mayor from 1986 to 1996. Lord Mayors of Hobart are elected every two years. Doone Kennedy consistently won all five of her mayoral elections with approximately 65% of the vote.

Kennedy declined to re-election in 1996, citing the wishes of her husband and, in an interview with The Mercury, saying she "preferred to be a housewife." She was the longest serving Lord Mayor in Australia at the time of her retirement from office in 1996. Doone Kennedy remained the only woman to serve as Lord Mayor of Hobart until Sue Hickey's election in 2014.

In 1994, Kennedy was awarded the Officer of the Order of Australia. The award recognized her efforts to promote historic preservation in Hobart and her career in local government.

== Death and legacy ==
Doone Kennedy died following a short illness at the JW Whittle Ward palliative care unit on 30 August 2014, at the age of 87.

In October 2015, the Hobart Aquatic Centre was renamed in her honour as the Doone Kennedy Hobart Aquatic Centre.

Civic offices
Preceded by Brian Broadby	Lord Mayor of Hobart; 1986–1996	Succeeded by John Freeman
