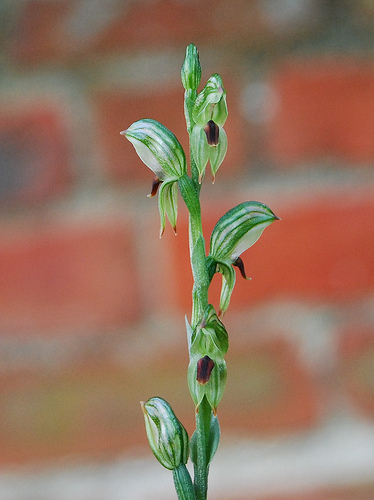
- Pterostylis williamsonii growing in Royal Tasmanian Botanical Gardens

Scientific classification
- Kingdom: Plantae
- Clade: Tracheophytes
- Clade: Angiosperms
- Clade: Monocots
- Order: Asparagales
- Family: Orchidaceae
- Subfamily: Orchidoideae
- Tribe: Cranichideae
- Genus: Pterostylis
- Species: P. williamsonii

Binomial name
- Pterostylis williamsonii D.L.Jones

Synonyms
- Oligochaetochilus williamsonii (D.L.Jones) Szlach.; Bunochilus williamsonii (D.L.Jones) D.L.Jones & M.A.Clem.

= Pterostylis williamsonii =

Brown-lip leafy greenhood

Species of orchid

Pterostylis williamsonii, commonly known as the brown-lip leafy greenhood, is a plant in the orchid family Orchidaceae and is endemic to Tasmania. Flowering plants have up to seven transparent green flowers with darker green and brown bands and a hairy, insect-like labellum with a blackish stripe. Non-flowering plants have a rosette of leaves on a short stalk but flowering plants lack the rosette, instead having five to seven stem leaves.

== Description ==
Pterostylis williamsonii, is a terrestrial, perennial, deciduous, herb with an underground tuber. Non-flowering plants have a rosette of between four and six dark green, egg-shaped leaves on a stalk 10–30 mm (0.4–1 in) long, each leaf 3–35 mm (0.1–1 in) long and 3–8 mm (0.1–0.3 in) wide. Flowering plants have up to nine transparent green flowers with darker green and brown bands on a flowering spike 90–300 mm (4–10 in) high. The flowering spike has five or six lance-shaped stem leaves which are 40–70 mm (2–3 in) long and 4–7 mm (0.2–0.3 in) wide. The flowers are 13–17 mm (0.5–0.7 in) long, 6–8 mm (0.2–0.3 in) wide. The dorsal sepal and petals are fused, forming a hood or "galea" over the column with the dorsal sepal having a brown tip. The lateral sepals turn downwards, are 12–15 mm (0.5–0.6 in) long, 6–8 mm (0.2–0.3 in) wide and have a narrow tip about 4 mm (0.2 in) long which is orange-brown on its end. The labellum is insect-like, 4–5 mm (0.16–0.20 in) long, about 3 mm (0.1 in) wide and creamy yellow to dark chocolate brown with a black central stripe. Flowering occurs from April to July.

== Taxonomy and naming ==
Pterostylis williamsonii was first formally described in 1998 by David Jones and the description was published in Australian Orchid Research from a specimen collected by Ron and Kath Williamson at Coles Bay. The specific epithet (williamsonii) honours Ronald Herbert Williamson (1931-2003), who collected the type specimen.

== Distribution and habitat ==
The brown-lip leafy greenhood is widespread in Tasmania where it grows in forest near low shrubs and bracken.
