= Mary Grant Roberts =

Australian zoo owner

- Born: Mary Grant Lindsay; 15 April 1841; Hobart, Van Diemen's Land
- Died: 27 November 1921 (aged 80); Hobart, Australia

Mary Grant Roberts (15 April 1841 – 27 November 1921) was an Australian zoo owner. Roberts owned Hobart Zoo from when it opened in 1895 until her death in 1921. The zoo was closed in 1937.

== Life and career ==
Roberts was born in Hobart, Australia, on 15 April 1841. She was the youngest child of William Lindsay and Mary Lindsay née Willing. She married Henry Llewelyn Roberts on 18 August 1863 in St David's Cathedral in Hobart. Henry Roberts owned a woolbroking and stock-agency company. He died in 1919, aged 88.

Roberts and her husband built their home, Beaumaris, in 1877 and it was opened as a zoo in 1895 as Beaumaris Zoo, later the name changed to Hobart Zoo. Roberts was the first person to breed Tasmanian Tigers Thylacine, the last of which died in Hobart Zoo in 1936. Roberts was elected to the Zoological Society of London in 1910 and published an article on her work breeding Tasmanian Tigers in the Proceedings of the Zoological Society of London in 1915.

Through her interest in animal welfare, Roberts founded the Game Preservation Society and the Anti-Plumage League. She also successfully campaigned with the Royal Society of Tasmania to strengthen Tasmania's laws on animal welfare.

After her death on 27 November 1921, Roberts donated the zoo to the trustees of the Tasmanian Museum who passed it to Hobart City Council. The council moved the zoo to an old quarry site in Queens Domain. The zoo closed in 1937 due to high maintenance costs and a decrease in the number of visitors.

In 2006, Roberts was inducted onto the Tasmanian Honour Roll of Women for her services to the community.
