= John Helder Wedge =

Australian politician (1793–1872)

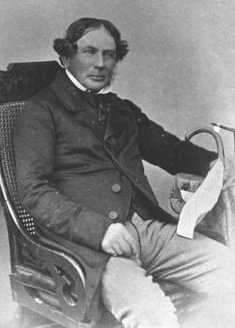
John Helder Wedge

John Helder Wedge (1793 – 22 November 1872) was a surveyor, explorer and politician in Van Diemen's Land (now Tasmania, Australia).

== Early life ==
Born 1793, Wedge was the second son of Charles Wedge of Shudy Camps, of Cambridgeshire, England. John Wedge learned the basics of surveying from his father.

== Van Diemens Land ==
The brothers arrived in Van Diemen's Land aboard the Heroine on the morning of 15 April 1824.

== Port Phillip District ==
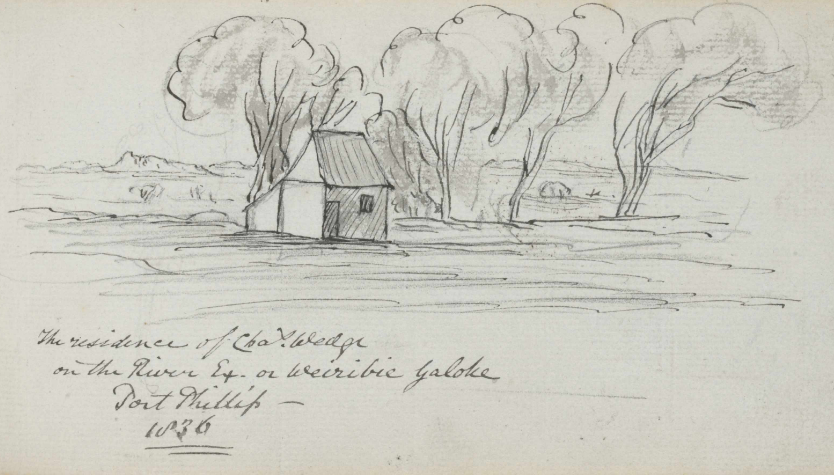
John Helder Wedge's property, sketched in 1836, the year after the European settlement of nearby Melbourne

Wedge arrived the site of Melbourne on 2 September 1835, where he discovered members of a party organised by John Pascoe Fawkner. Wedge was against the forceful removal of Fawkner's party. Wedge named the Yarra River on 13 September 1835.

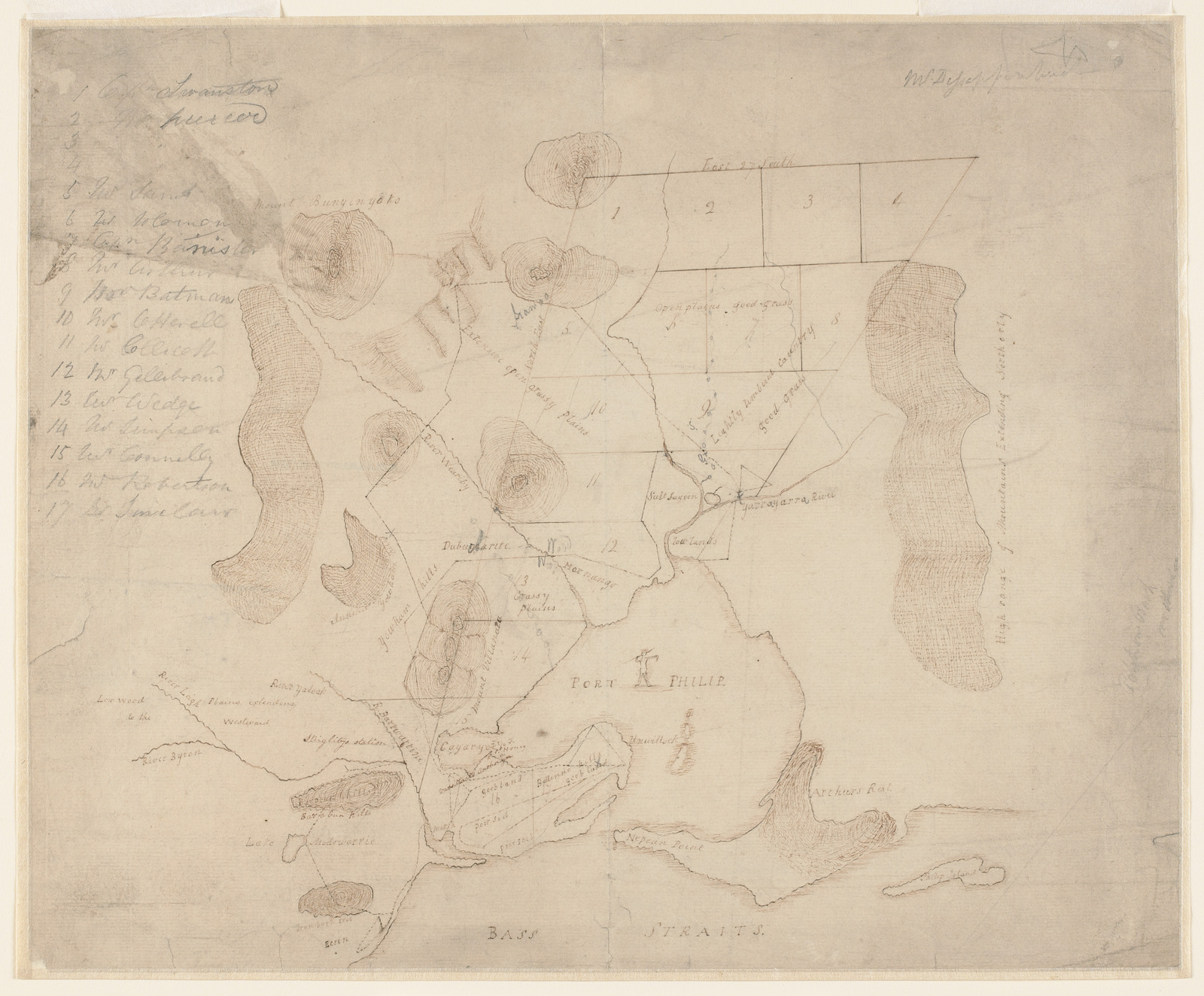
John Helder Wedge's map of John Batman's exploration of the Port Phillip District, drawn in 1835. This map shows the proposed subdivision of the lands amongst the Port Phillip Association members.

== Leighland ==
In or soon after 1824, Wedge was granted a 1500-acre property which he called Leighland, later known as Leighlands, situated on the South Esk River, south of the town of Perth, in the Norfolk Plains district of Tasmania. He subsequently developed the property into a large sheep farm, building a house which was completed between 1830 and 1833.

Leighland passed on the death of John Helder Wedge to his nephew Thomas Wedge, and on his death in 1880 eventually went out of the Wedge family, and, following its acquisition by Alfred Youl, has since been in the Youl family. The old homestead was burnt down in the 1950s.

Tasmanian Legislative Council
New seat	Member for North Esk; 1855–1860	Succeeded by William Gibson
Preceded by Thomas Horne	Member for Hobart; 1860–1866; Served alongside: Carter/Kennerley, Wilson	Succeeded by Philip Fysh
Preceded by Alexander Kissock	Member for Huon; 1866–1868	Succeeded by John Foster
