= William Carter (Tasmanian politician) =

Australian politician

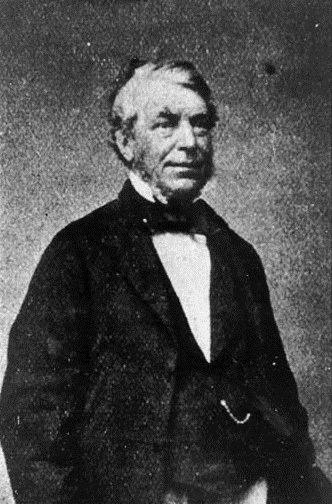
- Photograph of William Carter, 1860

1st Mayor of Hobart
- In office January 1853 – 1854
- Succeeded by: William Gore Elliston

Member of the Tasmanian Legislative Council
- In office 18 October 1859 – 15 June 1865 Serving with James Milne Wilson; Thomas Horne
- Constituency: Hobart

Personal details
- Born: 1796 England
- Died: 8 July 1878 (aged 81–82) Toorak, Victoria
- Spouse: Mary Ann

William Carter (1796 – 8 July 1878) was the first Mayor of Hobart.

== Merchant ==
Carter arrived in the colony of Van Diemen's Land in 1835, and worked as a storekeeper and merchant. He had a hardware and grocery store at the corner of Collins and Elizabeth streets, before relocating to the corner of Murray and Collins streets, where he established the firm of William Carter and Co., wholesale wine and spirit merchant.

== Magistrate ==
Carter was appointed as a Commissioner of the Peace, and in this capacity visited the Brickfields Hiring Depot in 1844 with William Watchorn, and reported on the condition of female convicts there. They stated that "the whole system is one of great mismanagement dangerous to the community & destructive of any hope that might otherwise be entertained of the moral reformation of any of the Class."

== Politician ==
Carter served as an alderman for the City of Hobart from 1846–1847, and again, this time as mayor, from 1853–1854. According to his obituary, he "sustained the dignity and importance of his position in a becoming manner." Carter later became a Member of the Legislative Council for Hobart, along with Thomas Horne and James Milne Wilson, serving in this office from 1859 to 1865. In this capacity he was involved in laying the foundation stone for the Playhouse Theatre and Union Chapel.

== Death and legacy ==
Carter moved to Toorak in Victoria toward the end of his life, and died there on 8 July 1878.

Carter has been described as a "shrewd and astute business man," while his obituary noted that he "was especially distinguished for his aversion to slander and backbiting." He was "frequently known, when people began to speak against others, to walk away, so as not to be led into saying a word in the way of reproach of absent persons."

== Personal life ==
Carter sailed from London on 20 July 1833 on board the barque "Wave" with his wife Mary Ann, 6 children and 3 servants. They arrived in Tasmania on 14 November 1833. Carter had 8 children in all: Mary Ann, Joseph, William, Lydia, Robert, Emma Mary, Eliza and Millie. The youngest two were born in Hobart.

Tasmanian Legislative Council
Preceded by Edward Bedford	Member for Hobart; 1859–1865; Served alongside: Horne/Wedge, Wilson	Succeeded by Alfred Kennerley
