= William Edward Nairn =

Australian politician

William Edward Nairn (1812 – 9 July 1869) was an English-born politician in Australia, president of the Tasmanian Legislative Council.

Born in Widcombe, Somerset, England, Nairn was the only son of Captain William Nairn and his wife Mary Ann. W. E. Nairn studied at Lincoln College, Oxford (B.A., 1833), and was granted a license to trade on a schooner his father had purchased for trade on the Tasmanian coast.

Nairn emigrated to Tasmania with Sir John Franklin, arriving in Hobart in February 1837 aboard the Fairlie. In June 1837 Nairn was appointed clerk in the Colonial Secretary's Office. He was made Secretary to the Board of Education in 1839. He was elected to the Tasmanian Legislative Council, becoming its president in September 1859. In September 1868 he took sick leave but did not recover. He died at Hobart on 9 July 1869, survived by his wife Maria, née Swan.

Tasmanian Legislative Council
New seat	Member for Meander; 1856–1869	Succeeded by Alexander Clerke
Preceded by Thomas Horne	President of the Tasmanian Legislative Council; 1859–1868	Succeeded by Frederick Innes
