= Cascade Brewery =

Oldest operating brewery in Australia

Coordinates: 42°53′45″S 147°17′33″E

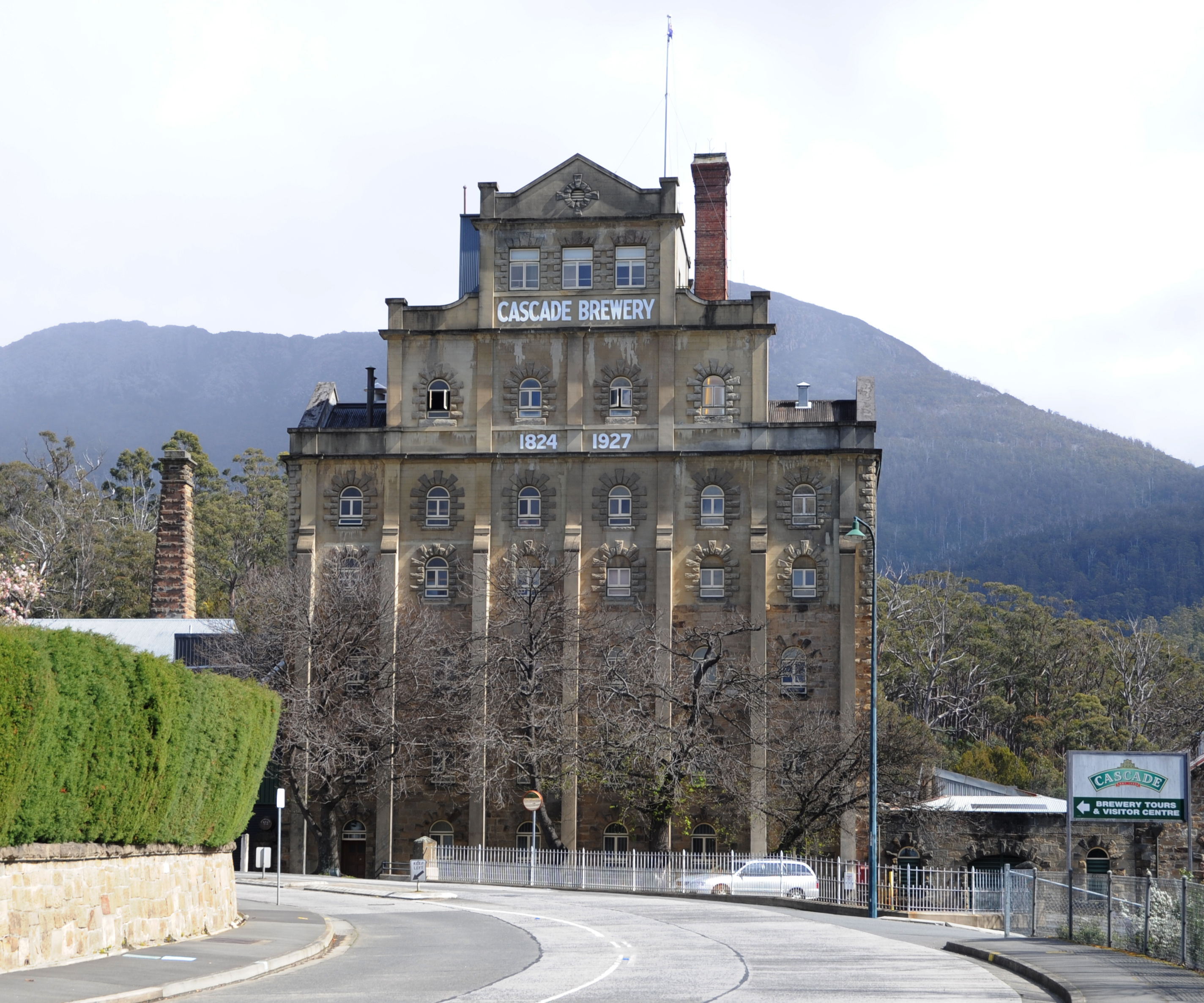
- Cascade Brewery
- Location: South Hobart Tasmania, Australia
- Opened: 1824
- Key people: Peter Degraves, Major McIntosh
- Annual production volume: 360,000 hectolitres (310,000 US bbl)
- Owner: Asahi

Active beers
Name	Type
Cascade Premium Lager	Lager
Cascade Premium Light	Low-alcohol Lager
Cascade Pale Ale (Green)	Lager
Cascade Blonde	Wheat Beer
Cascade Draught	Lager
Cascade Lager (Blue)	Lager
Cascade Bitter (Red)	Bitter Lager
Cascade Stout	Stout
Cascade Bright	Bright Ale

Seasonal beers
Name	Type
Cascade First Harvest	Special Ale

The Cascade Brewery is a brewery established in 1824 in South Hobart, Tasmania that is the oldest continually operating brewery in Australia.

As well as beer, the site also produces a range of non-alcoholic products. It is home to a function centre, as well as operating tourism related ventures including guided tours and a retail outlet.

== History ==
The Cascade estate was originally a saw milling operation, run by a partnership called Macintosh and Degraves Sawmills. The mills began operation in 1825 and the brewery was founded beside the Hobart Rivulet in 1832 by Hugh Macintosh (1776–1834) with his nephews Henry and Charles Degraves while Peter Degraves was in Hobart prison serving a five-year sentence.

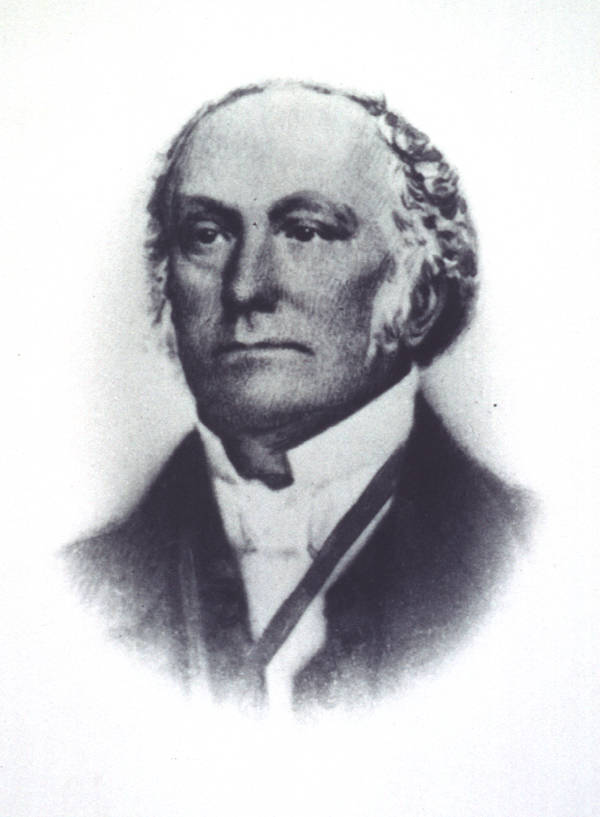
Peter Degraves

Until 2011 the conventional history of Cascade Brewery held that the brewery, and the other enterprises at Cascade, had been founded by Peter Degraves. However research by historian Greg Jefferys for his Masters thesis showed that the major partner in the Cascade Mills and Brewery had actually been Major Hugh Macintosh and that Degraves had falsified the history of the brewery after Macintosh's death in 1834.

Macintosh was a retired East India Company officer who emigrated from England on his ship Hope in 1824 with his business partner Peter Degraves (1778–1852). Degraves was an undischarged bankrupt and a convicted thief. In 1826, charges were laid against Degraves for debts incurred in England, and he was taken into custody until 1832. As a result of Degraves' arrest, Macintosh dissolved the partnership, paid all of the partnership's outstanding debts, and took over the running of the sawmills with his two nephews as well as expanding his farming interests near New Norfolk.

After his release in 1832, Peter Degraves took over running and expanding the brewery on the property owned by himself and Macintosh. Macintosh moved to his farm on the banks for the Derwent River where he pursued his interests in viticulture and Merino sheep.

During this period, Macintosh supported Henry Savery, who wrote Australia's first novel. After Macintosh's death in December 1834, his half-share of the Cascade estate passed to his son William Macintosh who lived in Madras, India. Degraves offered to buy William's share but never paid his nephew, and William died a pauper in 1840, still owed a small fortune by his wealthy uncle Peter Degraves. After Macintosh's death, Degraves continued to expand both the milling and brewing operations at the Cascade, exporting both timber and beer to mainland Australia, particularly to Victoria where the gold rush created huge demands for both timber and beer.

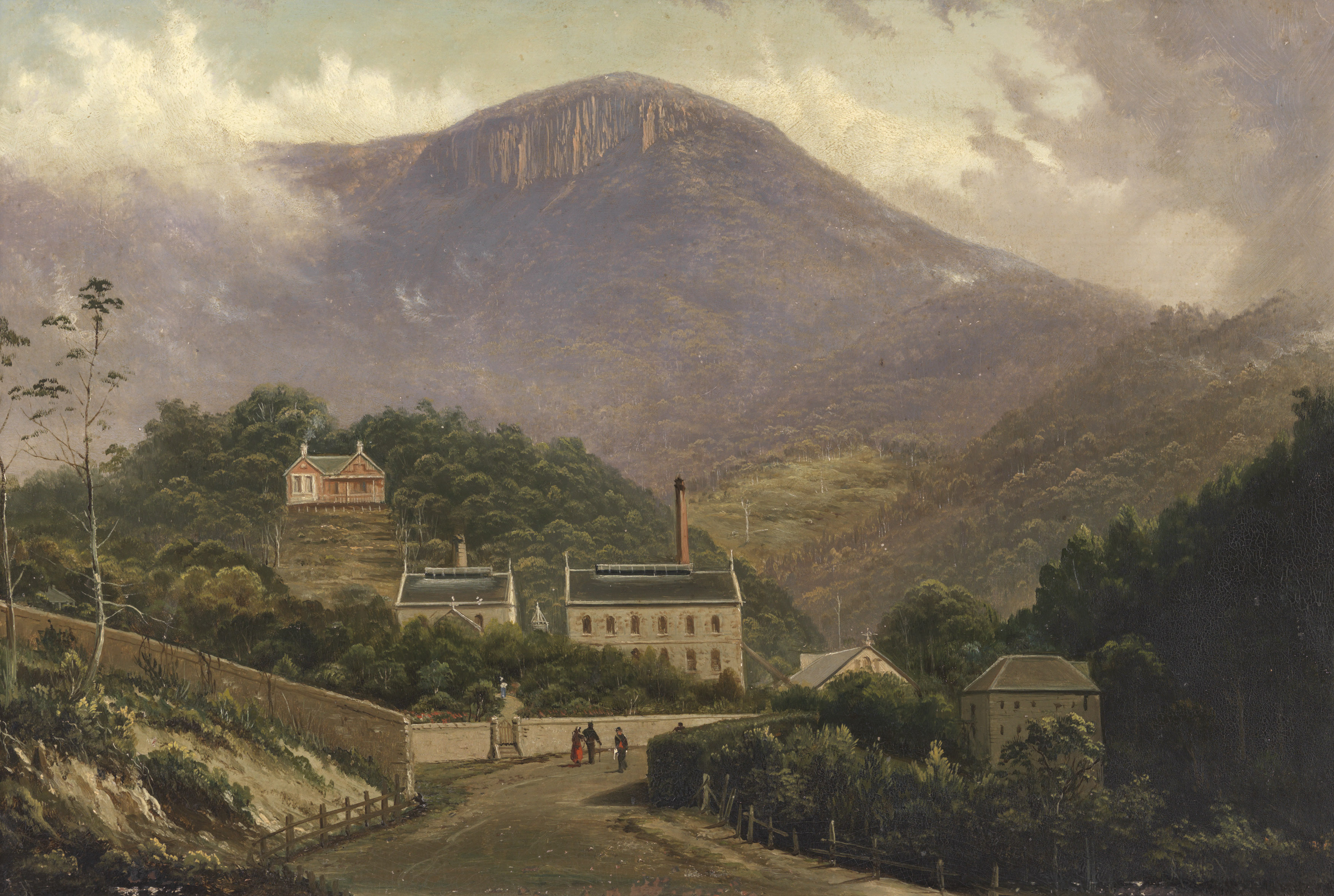
Cascade Brewery and Mount Wellington by Haughton Forrest (c1890)

After Degraves' death, Cascade passed into the control of his eldest son, Henry Degraves. However, Henry Degraves died two years after his father and the management of the brewery passed to James Milne Wilson, husband of Degraves' youngest daughter, Deborah Hope Degraves. Until 2020 it was owned by AB InBev, through its Australian subsidiary Carlton & United Breweries. Cascade was included in the June 2020 purchase of Carlton & United by Asahi. Cascade produces a range of beers, apple cider and non-alcoholic beverages including apple juice, blackcurrant syrup and carbonated beverages.

In 1967 the building housing the brewery was almost completely destroyed by the bushfires that devastated south-east Tasmania. With a rebuild to commence in no time at all, the brewery was back up and running a mere three months later.

The image adopted for its label in 1987, Henry Constantine Richter's nineteenth-century illustration of the Tasmanian Tiger is from John Gould's The Mammals of Australia.

Cascade is unique among Australian breweries and rare among breweries worldwide in that it operates its own maltings, producing malt for its mainstream beers (including Premium Lager and Pale Ale) from locally grown barley. Specialty malts for dark beers and the seasonal range are imported from mainland Australia and from overseas. The Cascade name is also given to the sporting event 'The Cascade Cup'.

The Cascade Brewery is designated on the Tasmanian Heritage Register.

== Beers ==
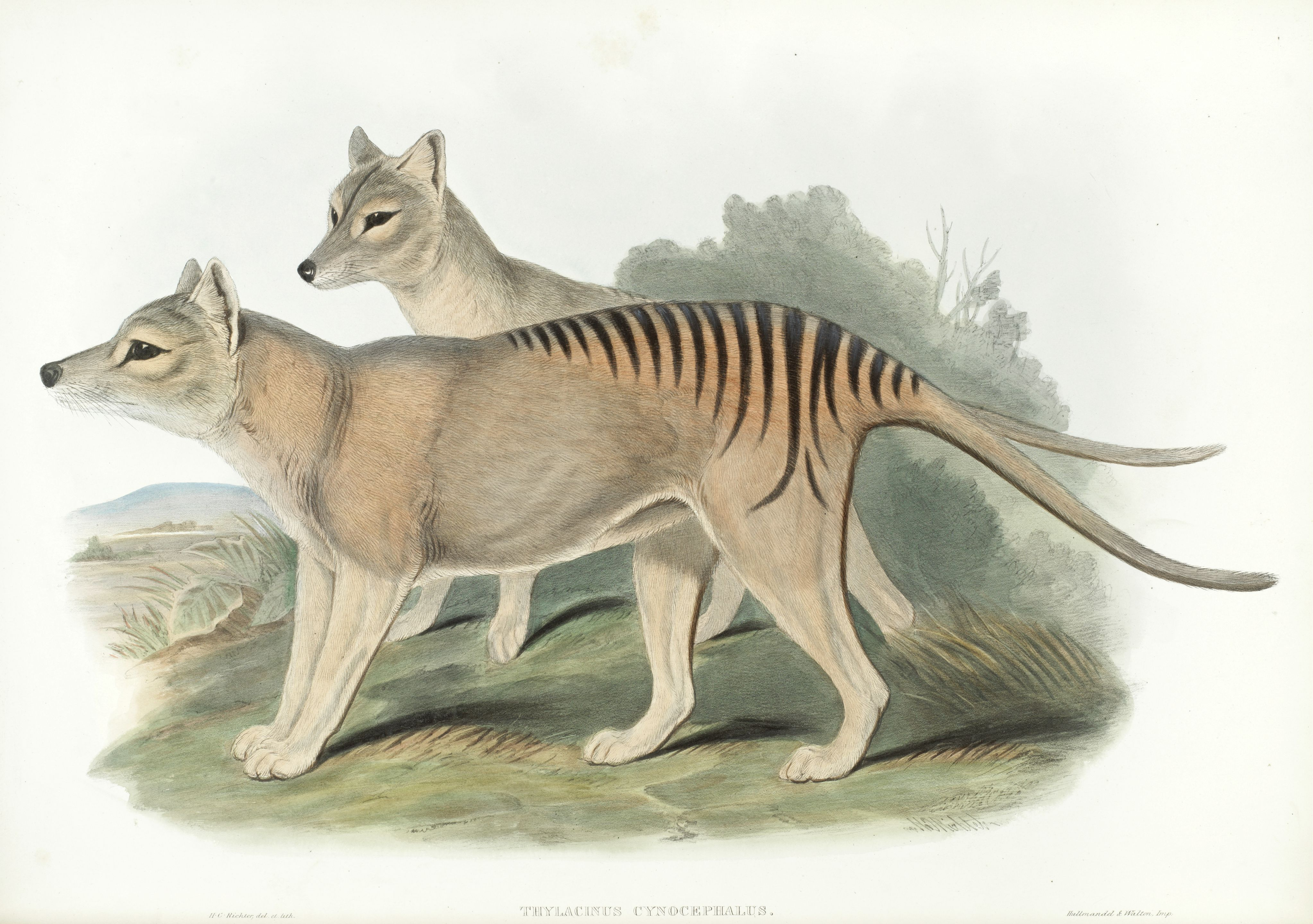
Featured on the label, the illustration of the Tasmanian Tiger from John Gould and Henry Constantine Richter, in The Mammals of Australia

=== Premium range ===
- Cascade Premium Lager is an Australian-style lager, hopped with Australian "Summer" hops to give the beer a distinct spicy flavour. Alcohol Content: 4.5% Originally, 5.2%.
- Cascade Premium Light is a low-alcohol lager, which is currently the biggest selling light beer in Australia. Alcohol Content: 2.6%

Degrave's Collection:

- Cascade Pale Ale, also known as "green" or simply "Pale", is in fact an Australian-style lager, not an ale. The Pale Ale name has been used since the brewery was established and was originally an ale style beer. The Pale Ale has an excellent balance of the famous "Pride of Ringwood" Hop and Pale Malt giving the beer a fruity mid palette and spicy end palette. Alcohol Content: 5.0% (originally 5.2%)
- Cascade Stout is a stout beer, commonly drunk by an older audience. The Cascade Stout is brewed with a blend of different malts and grains including roasted barley, which gives the brew chocolate and coffee overtones. Alcohol Content: 5.8%
- Cascade Blonde is a premium lager beer brewed with a blend of barley and wheat malts, then hopped using the "Cascade" Hop to give a light bitterness. The wheat malt in this brew gives the beer a citrus like mid palette. Alcohol Content: 4.8%
- Cascade Pure was launched as "Cascade Green" Carbon Neutral Beer in March 2008. It is a low carbohydrate, preservative free beer. Cascade use accredited schemes to offset production emissions, and use vegetable inks on the label and a lightweight bottle. In 2008, it won the Tasmanian Premier's Award for Climate Action. The name change to Cascade Pure took place in November 2010 and was an odd choice after only two years—rival Boags already offer a "Pure" beer. Cascade's media release said the change was "to reflect not only the environmental credentials of the 100 per cent carbon neutral beer and its great taste, neither of which will change, but also the quality of the local Tasmanian ingredients used in the brew with nothing artificial added". Alcohol content: 4.5%

This range was launched in September 2005, it consists of existing products with more focused marketing and labeling. There was a further major overhaul of the brand in 2010.

=== Tasmanian range ===
- Cascade Draught is a traditional full strength lager. It is Tasmania's best selling beer on tap. In Tasmania it is the most commonly found Cascade product on tap (draught). Alcohol Content: 4.7%
- Cascade Lager, also known as "blue", is a traditional full strength lager. This is Tasmania’s best selling caned and bottled beer. It has a cult following, particularly among uni students. Alcohol Content: 4.8%
- Cascade Bitter, also known as "red", is a bitter lager. Alcohol Content: 4.4%
- Cascade Export Stout, is similar to the stout featured in the Degrave's Collection however is brewed with a shorter maturation time and has a slightly stronger flavour. Alcohol Content: 5.8%

These beers are only available in Tasmania.

Seasonal & limited edition beers:

Cascade has also produced an annual premium beer since 2002, "First Harvest", which has an extremely limited production. "First Harvest" refers to the first yield of Tasmanian hops, in which the actual unkilned hops flowers are used for the brew. First Harvest, which is brewed to a different recipe every year, is brewed as an ale.

From 2003 until the launch of Degrave's collection Cascade produced a range of seasonal beers:

- Cascade Summer Blonde now Cascade Blonde.
- Cascade Autumn Amber now Cascade Amber.
- Cascade Winter Warmer a dark wheat beer. Winter Warmer was available as a seasonal beer in Tasmania for at least 10 years, but only on tap at selected pubs.
- Cascade Spring Fest a Bavarian helles style lager.

=== Homebrew range ===
- Spicy Ghost Draught
- Golden Harvest Lager
- Imperial Voyage Pale Ale
- Chocolate Mahogany Porter

== Non-alcoholic beverages ==
The non-alcoholic range of products (Cascade Beverages) was acquired by Coca-Cola Amatil in the third quarter of 2013.

- Fruit Syrups - range includes Raspberry and Ultra-C Blackcurrant Syrup, made from Tasmanian grown blackcurrants.
- Apple Isle Sparkling Apple Juice
- Quality Mixers - range includes Lime & Soda, Tonic Water, Soda Water, Cranberry, Dry Ginger Ale
- Classic Adult Sparkling Flavours - range includes Sarsaparilla, Lemon, Ginger, Lemon Lime & Bitters
- Cordials - Lemon, Raspberry, Lime
- "Traditional" Flavours, including Raspberry, Saraparilla and Ice Cream

== See also ==
- Australian pub
- Beer in Australia
- List of breweries in Australia
- Tasmanian beer
- Cascades FC
- List of oldest companies in Australia
