= Brian Broadby =

Australian politician (1943–2023)

Brian Trevor Arthur Broadby (9 February 1943 – 24 October 2023) was an Australian politician.

He was elected as an alderman to the City of Hobart local government area between 1972 and 1986, was the Deputy Mayor between 1976 and 1982 and was the Mayor from 1984 to 1986. Broadby died on 24 October 2023, at the age of 80.

Civic offices
Preceded by Douglas Robert Plaister	Lord Mayor of Hobart; 1984–1986	Succeeded by Doone Kennedy
