= John Freeman (Hobart) =

Australian politician (1939–2025)

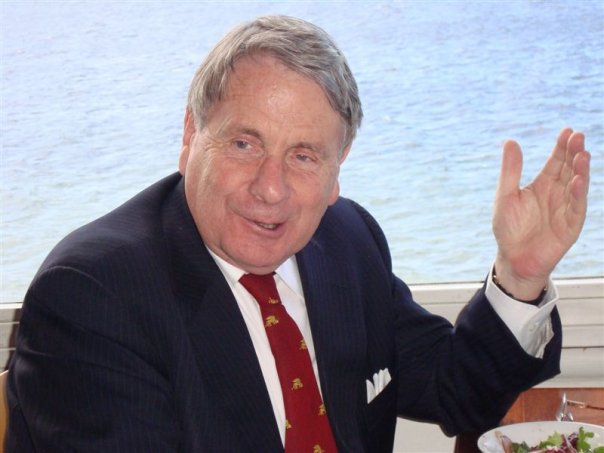
Freeman in 2009

Dr John William Freeman (1 June 1939 – 12 July 2025) was an Australian politician and Lord Mayor of Hobart, Tasmania. An independent, he previously served as a leader of the Tasmanian Liberal Party. He is also the former chairman of Hobart Water.

He was elected as an alderman to the City of Hobart local government area from 1988 to 1999, 2000 to 2009 and 2012 to 2014, was the Deputy Mayor between 1990 and 1994 and was the Lord Mayor from 1996 to 1999.

Dr Freeman was a Consultant Physician and instrumental in setting up the Intensive Care and Renal Units at the Royal Hobart Hospital. He was a vice-president of Liberal Party of Tasmania but served his term as Mayor as an independent. In 2002 he left the Liberal Party. Dr Freeman was married to Jill Christine Freeman who died in 2017.

Freeman died on 12 July 2025 at the age of 86.

Civic offices
Preceded by Doone Kennedy	Lord Mayor of Hobart; 1996–1999	Succeeded by Rob Valentine
