= List of mayors and lord mayors of Hobart =

Lord Mayor of Hobart

- Incumbent; Charles Woolley since October 2026
- Style: The Right Honourable the Lord Mayor of Hobart, Councillor
- Member of: Hobart City Council
- Seat: Hobart Town Hall
- Term length: 4 years (renewable)
- Constituting instrument: Local Government Act, 1993
- Precursor: Mayor of Hobart
- Inaugural holder: William Carter (Mayor); Joshua J. Wignall (Lord Mayor)
- Formation: 1853 (as Mayor); 1935 (as Lord Mayor)
- Unofficial names: 'Lord Mayor'
- Salary: A$145,657

This is a list of the mayors and lord mayors of the City of Hobart local government area, Hobart, Tasmania, Australia.

== Mayors (1853–1934) ==
#	Portrait	Mayor	Term		Ref
#	Portrait	Mayor	Start	End	Ref
1		William Carter	1853	1854	
2		William Gore Elliston	1855	1856	
3		John Leslie Stewart	1857		
4		Osmond H. Gilles	1858		
5		David Lewis	July 1858	1859	
6		Henry Cook	1860	1861	
7		Alfred Kennerley	1862	1863	
8		Robert Walker	1864	1867	
9		J. M. Wilson	1868	1869	
10		H. Cook	August 1869		
11		Thomas Christie Smart	1870		
(7)		Alfred Kennerley	1871	1872	
12		George Crisp	1873	1875	
13		John Perkins	1876	1877	
14		William Patrick Green	1878		
15		Wiliam Henry Burgess	1879	1880	
16		James Harcourt	1881	1882	
17		William Belbin	1883	1884	
18		John George Davies	1885	1886	
19		Charles Harbottle	1887		
20		Alfred Crisp	1888	1889	
21		John Watchorn	1890		
22		George Hiddlestone	1891		
23		Thomas Augustus Reynolds	1891		
24		George Stanton Crouch	1893		
(21)		John Watchorn	1894	1896	
(18)		John George Davies	1897		
(22)		George Hiddlestone	1898		
(18)		John George Davies	1899	1901	
25		George Kerr	1902		
26		Thomas Bennison	1903	1904	
(25)		George Kerr	1905		
(20)		Alfred Crisp	1906		
27		Charles Duncan Haywood	1907		
28		Daniel Freeman	1908		
29		J. W. Hoggins	1909		
30		C. J. Atkins	1910		
31		Thomas H. Amott	1911		
(20)		Alfred Crisp	1912	1913	
32		R. J. Meagher	1914		
33		W. H. Williams	1915		
34		L. H. Macleod	1916		
35		R. D. Lord	1917		
36		J. G. Shield	1918	1919	
37		R. Eccles Snowden	1920	July 1922	
38		J. A. McKenzie	July 1922		
39		John Soundy	1924		
40		Francis Valentine	1925	1926	
41		Edwin J. Rogers, C.M.G.	1926	1927	
42		J. J. Wignall	1927	1929	
(39)		John Soundy	1929	1932	
(42)		Joshua J. Wignall, C.M.G.	1932	1934	

== Lord mayors (since 1935) ==
The title of lord mayor was conferred on the position of mayor during the 1934 – 1935 council.

#	Portrait	Lord Mayor	Term		Party
#	Portrait	Lord Mayor	Start	End	Party
(42)		Joshua J. Wignall, C.M.G.	1935	1938	
(39)		John Soundy	1938	1946	Independent Nationalist
43		W. W. Osborne	1946	1948	
44		Richard O. Harris	1948	1950	
45		Archibald R. Park	1950	1952	Independent Liberal
(44)		Sir Richard Harris, C.M.G.	1952	1954	
(45)		Archibald R. Park, C.M.G.	1954	1959	Independent Liberal
46		Sir Basil Osborne	1959	1970	
47		Ronald George Soundy	1970	1976	
48		Douglas Robert Plaister	1976	1984	
49		Brian Broadby	1984	1986	
50		Doone Kennedy	1986	1996	
51		John Freeman	1996	1999	Independent
52		Rob Valentine	1999	2011	Independent
53		Damon Thomas	2011	2014	Independent
54		Sue Hickey	2014	2018	Independent Liberal
55		Ron Christie	2018		
56		Anna Reynolds	November 2018	October 2026	Independent (2018–2022)
56		Anna Reynolds	November 2018	October 2026	Your Hobart Independents (since 2022)
57		Charles Wooley	October 2026	Incumbent	

== Election results ==
=== 2022 ===
2022 Tasmanian mayoral elections: Hobart
Party	Candidate	Votes	%	±%
Your Hobart Independents	Anna Reynolds	9,015	28.78	
Independent	John Kelly	6,190	19.76	
Independent	Marti Zucco	3,676	11.73	
Independent	Louise Elliot	3,593	11.47	
Greens	Bill Harvey	3,481	11.11	
Independent Liberal	Louise Bloomfield	3,025	9.65	
Our Hobart	Marcus Bai	1,176	3.75	
Independent Liberal	Will Coats	1,161	3.70	
Total formal votes		31,317	97.87	
Informal votes		684	2.13	
Turnout		32,001	83.02	
Two-candidate-preferred result
Your Hobart Independents	Anna Reynolds	14,571	53.41	
Independent	John Kelly	12,711	46.59	
Your Hobart Independents hold		Swing		
