= Thomas Horne (politician) =

Australian politician

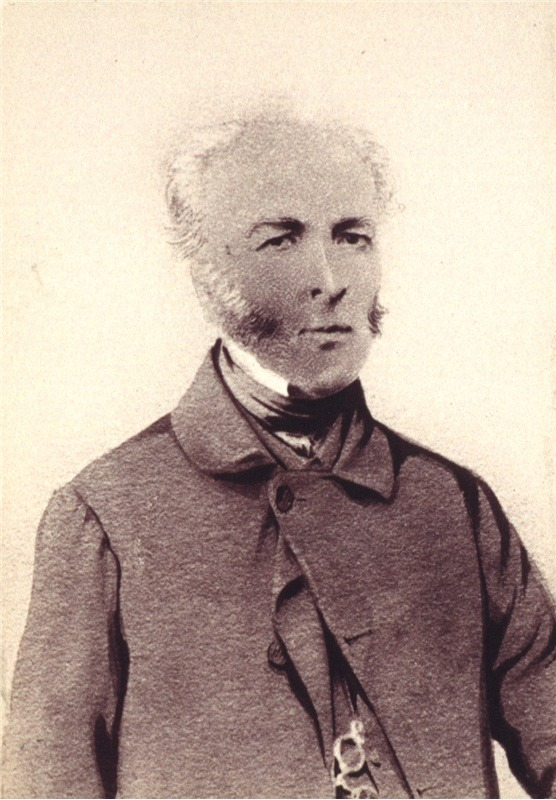

President of the Tasmanian Legislative Council
- In office 2 December 1856 – September 1859
- Succeeded by: William Nairn

Personal details
- Born: 8 June 1800
- Died: 23 September 1870 (aged 70)
- Party: Independent

Thomas Horne (8 June 1800 – 23 September 1870) was an Australian judge and politician.

== Early life ==
Horne was born in Chiswick, Middlesex and educated at Westminster School and Christ Church, Oxford. He entered Lincoln's Inn and was called to the Bar in February 1827. He married Maria Hyriott in 1826.

== Arrival in the colony ==
Horne travelled to Van Diemen's Land with his wife and two daughters, arriving in Hobart Town on 31 January 1830. He was soon engaged in local politics, opposing the governor, Sir George Arthur and editing the Colonist newspaper.

Horne's life was marked by frequent descent into debt. At one point he admitted to losses of £22,000.

== Legal career ==
He became Solicitor-General in January 1841, and acted as Attorney-General from July to November of that year. He became Attorney-General in March 1844, and in January 1848 was appointed as puisne judge to the Supreme Court of Tasmania. This appointment attracted criticism from the press due to Horne's financial history, and was unsuccessfully challenged in the Supreme Court. When Sir John Pedder retired as Chief Justice, the Lieutenant Governor, Sir William Denison, recommended Valentine Fleming over Horne, arguing that the instability in Horne's finances made him an unsuitable candidate for the position.

== Political career ==
Horne was elected to the Legislative Council as member for Hobart, along with William Carter and James Milne Wilson. In January 1857 a special Act was passed to enable Horne to act as both a judge and an unsalaried President of the Legislative Council.

In 1861 Horne was elected to the House of Assembly as a representative of Hobart Town. He served in the House of Assembly until 1866.

== See also ==
- List of Judges of the Supreme Court of Tasmania

Tasmanian Legislative Council
New title	President of the Tasmanian Legislative Council; 1856–1859	Succeeded by William Nairn
New seat	Member for Hobart; 1856–1860; Served alongside: Bedford/Carter, Walker/Wilson	Succeeded by John Wedge
