= Cascade Beverages =

Australian beverage brand

- Industry: Beverage industry
- Founded: 1886
- Headquarters: Hobart, Australia
- Products: Drink mixers, Soft drink
- Website: www.cascadedrinks.com.au

Cascade Beverages is a range of non-alcoholic mixers and adult soft drinks that are made and sold in Australia. Established in 1886 as part of the Cascade Brewery in Tasmania, the range became part of the Coca-Cola Amatil business in 2013 and continues to be made in Australia with majority Australian ingredients.

== Products ==
Below is a listing of the products on offer:

- Fruit Syrups - range includes Raspberry, made with crushed raspberries from Tasmania and Ultra-C Blackcurrant Syrup, made from Tasmanian grown blackcurrants from Westerway Farms .
- Quality Mixers - range includes Tonic Water, Dry Ginger Ale, Soda Water & Lime, Soda Water & Lemon, and regular Soda Water
- Adult Sparkling Flavours - range includes Ginger Beer, Lemon Lime & Bitters and Sarsaparilla
- Cordials - Lemon, Raspberry, Lime

These flavors are available in 330mL glass bottles at cafes, restaurants, and licensed venues, and in 4 x 200mL cans at supermarkets. For an on-tap experience, enjoy Dry Ginger Ale or Tonic Water in over 2,000 pubs, clubs, and bars, or in Coca-Cola soda towers and soda guns at virgin lounges across Australia. Additionally, virgin lounges serve Cascade Lemon Lime and Bitters in glass bottles

== See also ==
- List of brand name soft drinks products
- List of soft drink flavors
- List of soft drinks by country
- List of oldest companies in Australia
