= Domain Athletic Centre =

Athletics facility in Tasmania, Australia

- Interactive map of Domain Athletic Centre
- Address: Hobart; Australia
- Location: Queens Domain
- Coordinates: 42°52′6″S 147°19′30″E
- Type: Athletic Centre

Website
- Hobart City Council-Domain Athletic Centre

The Domain Athletic Centre is an athletics facility in Tasmania, Australia, located on the Queens Domain in the capital city of Hobart. It was formerly home to the Briggs Track Classic, the Tasmanian round of the Australian Athletics Tour. The stadium hosted the Australian Athletics Championships upon its opening in 1977 and is the foremost venue for athletics in Tasmania.

The centre has one major covered grandstand with seating, changerooms, public toilets, and a kiosk. It features low-grade lighting suitable for evening training, but not quite up to match standards. There is a carpark with 250 spaces.

It is an Olympic Standard 400 metre oval track with 8 lanes, as well as a 10 lane straight section for 100 metre sprinting, and 100 metre hurdle races. It also features a steeplechase lane with waterpit, and lanes for long jump, pole vault and dedicated areas for high jump, discus and hammer throwing and the javelin.

The interior of the track is grass, and is regularly used to host football matches for both local schools and Football Federation Tasmania league Association Football (soccer) matches.
