= John Watchorn =

Australian politician

John Watchorn (1826 – 4 March 1905) was an Australian politician. He was a member of the Tasmanian Legislative Council from 1882 until his death in 1905 and was Mayor of Hobart in 1890 and from 1894 to 1896.

Watchorn was born in Nottingham, England in 1826. He migrated to Tasmania with his family in 1837. He was a publican and wine merchant outside of politics. He was a City of Hobart councillor from 1876 to 1896 and mayor in 1890 and from 1894 to 1896. He also served as a magistrate and as a member of the Metropolitan Drainage Board.

Watchorn was declared elected unopposed to the Legislative Council in June 1881, filling a vacancy in the Huon electorate caused by the invalidation of Joseph Solomon's 1880 election. However, his election was challenged by petition, and in August 1881 the Elections and Qualifications Committee of the Legislative Council unseated Watchorn and declared William Fisher, Solomon's 1880 challenger, to have been elected. Fisher died on 3 April 1882, and Watchorn won the resulting May 1882 by-election comfortably. He was re-elected numerous times and served in the Legislative Council until his death in 1905.

He died in office in March 1905 and was buried at Cornelian Bay Cemetery.

Watchorn married Dorcas Anne Blakey (née Collins) on 15 August 1854. She predeceased him, and they had ten children.
