= Douglas Plaister =

Australian politician

Douglas Robert Plaister (25 June 1912 – 21 June 1993) was an Australian politician.

== Career ==
Plaister was elected as an alderman to the City of Hobart local government area between 1970 and 1990, was the Deputy Mayor between 1974 and 1976, and was the Mayor from 1976 to 1984.

Plaister was a swimming instructor. He argued for, and got a government established and run program that was led by physical education teachers and part of the school curriculum, which was a first for Australia. The program was for learn to swim lessons and later included water safety.

Plaister was married to Violet Beryl who died before him, and Fumiko. He first met Fumiko in the Japanese city of Yaizu in the mid-1970s when visiting to establish a sister city relationship between Yaizu and Hobart which was formalized in 1977.

Civic offices
Preceded by Ronald George Soundy	Lord Mayor of Hobart; 1976–1984	Succeeded by Brian Broadby
