= The Cornwall Chronicle =

Former newspaper in Tasmania, Australia

The Cornwall Chronicle was a newspaper published in Launceston, Tasmania, Australia, from 14 February 1835 to 13 November 1880. The publisher was William Lushington Goodwin.
