= Alfred Kennerley =

Australian politician

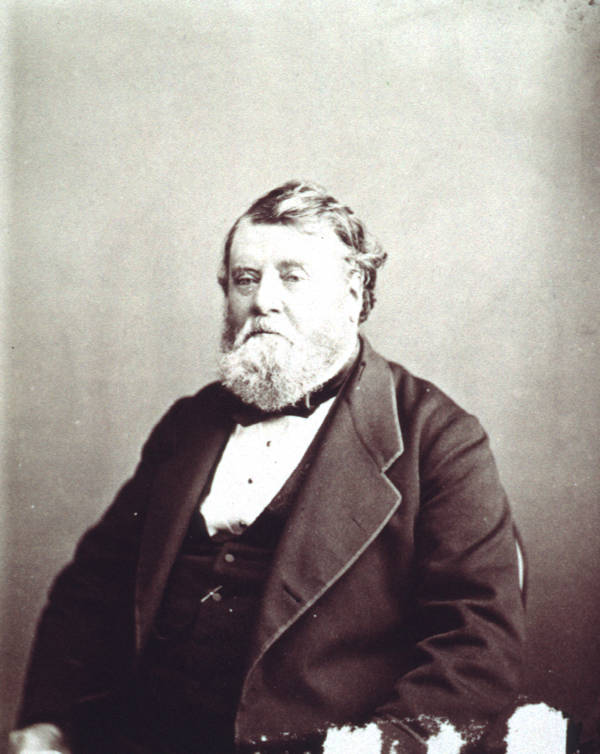

10th Premier of Tasmania
- In office 4 August 1873 – 20 July 1876
- Preceded by: Frederick Innes
- Succeeded by: Thomas Reibey

Personal details
- Born: 10 October 1810 Islington, London, England, UK
- Died: 15 November 1897 (aged 87) Hobart, Colony of Tasmania
- Spouse: Jane Rouse

Alfred Kennerley (10 October 1810 – 15 November 1897) was an Australian politician and Premier of Tasmania from 4 August 1873 until 20 July 1876.

Kennerley was born in Islington. On 18 February 1834 at Windsor he married Jane, daughter of Richard Rouse of Rouse Hill House. When his father died Kennerley leased his land and sold his livestock, planning to return to England. He sailed with his wife for London in March 1842 and returned to Sydney in January 1845. He resumed farming at Bringelly, became a magistrate and, in trust for his wife, acquired from Rouse more property in Parramatta. Kennerley was not robust and found the climate very trying. In 1853 he returned to England with his wife.

In June 1857 the Kennerleys arrived at Hobart in the Gloucester and named their new home Rouseville.

On 15 August 1873, William Lodewyk Crowther threatened Kennerley with violence when Kennerley mentioned Crowther's theft of Aboriginal Tasmanian remains:

A fracas occurred outside the Council chamber, Hobart Town, a few nights ago. Mr. Crowther, member for Hobart Town, threatened his colleague, Mr. Kennerley, with personal violence, because of the latter's allusion to Mr. Crowther's alleged abstraction of the last aboriginal's head. Mr. Kennerley called the attention of the House to the circumstance, and Mr. Crowther was reprimanded.

— Nelson Examiner and New Zealand Chronicle, 15 August 1873

Political offices
Preceded by Frederick Innes	Premier of Tasmania; 1873–1876	Succeeded by Thomas Reibey
Tasmanian Legislative Council
Preceded by William Carter	Member for Hobart; 1865–1877; Served alongside: Wedge/Fysh/Crowther, Wilson	Succeeded by James Agnew
