= Geneva Christian College =

Coordinates: 41.226°S 146.438°E

- Latrobe, Tasmania; Australia

Information
- Type: Christian, private school, day
- Motto: Proverbs 3:6 "In all your ways acknowledge Him and He shall direct your paths."
- Established: 1967
- Principal: Rosemary Lincolne
- Colours: Green & gold
- Website: http://geneva.tas.edu.au/

Geneva Christian College is a K–12 Christian school in Latrobe, outside of Devonport Tasmania.

The school is located just outside Latrobe, situated on 50 hectares of farm and bushland, and utilizes this within its curriculum.

Geneva Christian College is a member of Independent Schools Tasmania.
