= Peter Degraves =

Founder of Cascade Brewery

Peter Degraves was one of the founders of Cascade Brewery in Hobart, Tasmania.
