= John Walker (Australian politician) =

Australian politician

John Walker (1799 – 27 February 1874) was an Australian politician, member of the Tasmanian Legislative Council.

Walker was born in Ednam, Roxburghshire, Scotland, son of Robert Thomas Walker. John Walker emigrated to Van Diemen's Land (later renamed Tasmania) in 1822, and carried on business as a miller in Hobart for many years. He was appointed one of the Commissioners for Hobart before the establishment of a Municipal Council for the city. He was also a merchant and whaler.

In 1851 Walker was elected a member of the old unicameral Legislative Council for Brighton, and on the introduction of free institutions was elected on 6 October 1856 for the now upper house Legislative Council as member for Hobart. He was a member, without office, of Francis Smith's Ministry from 12 May 1857 to 1 November 1860.

Walker died in Hobart on 27 February 1874. Walker twice married: firstly to Janet Glass in 1827; they had several children, all of whom except one survived him; and secondly to Julia Speke née Coverdale in 1858, the widow of Charles Bradbury. His grandson was Alan Cameron Walker.
