= Royal Tasmanian Botanical Gardens =

Botanical garden in Hobart, Tasmania

Coordinates: 42.8652°S 147.3304°E

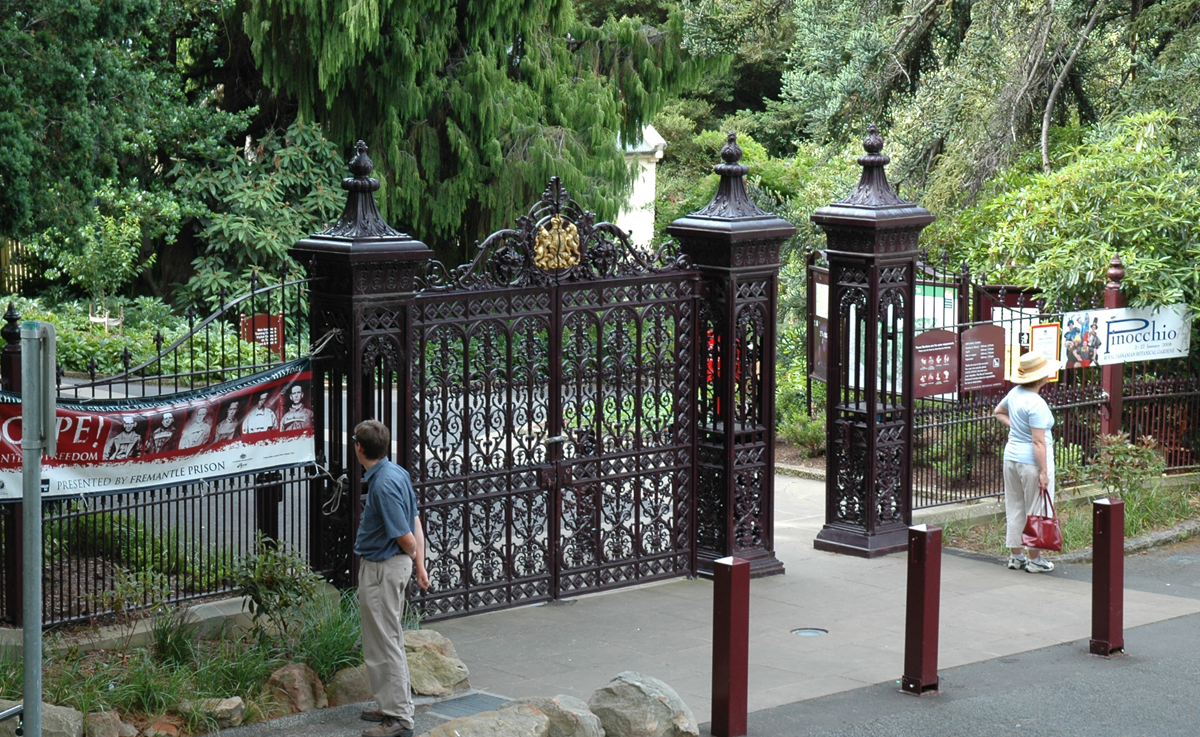
- Entrance to the Royal Tasmanian Botanical Gardens
- Location: Lower Domain Road,
- Nearest city: Hobart, Australia
- Area: 14 hectares (35 acres)
- Established: 1818
- Website: gardens.tas.gov.au

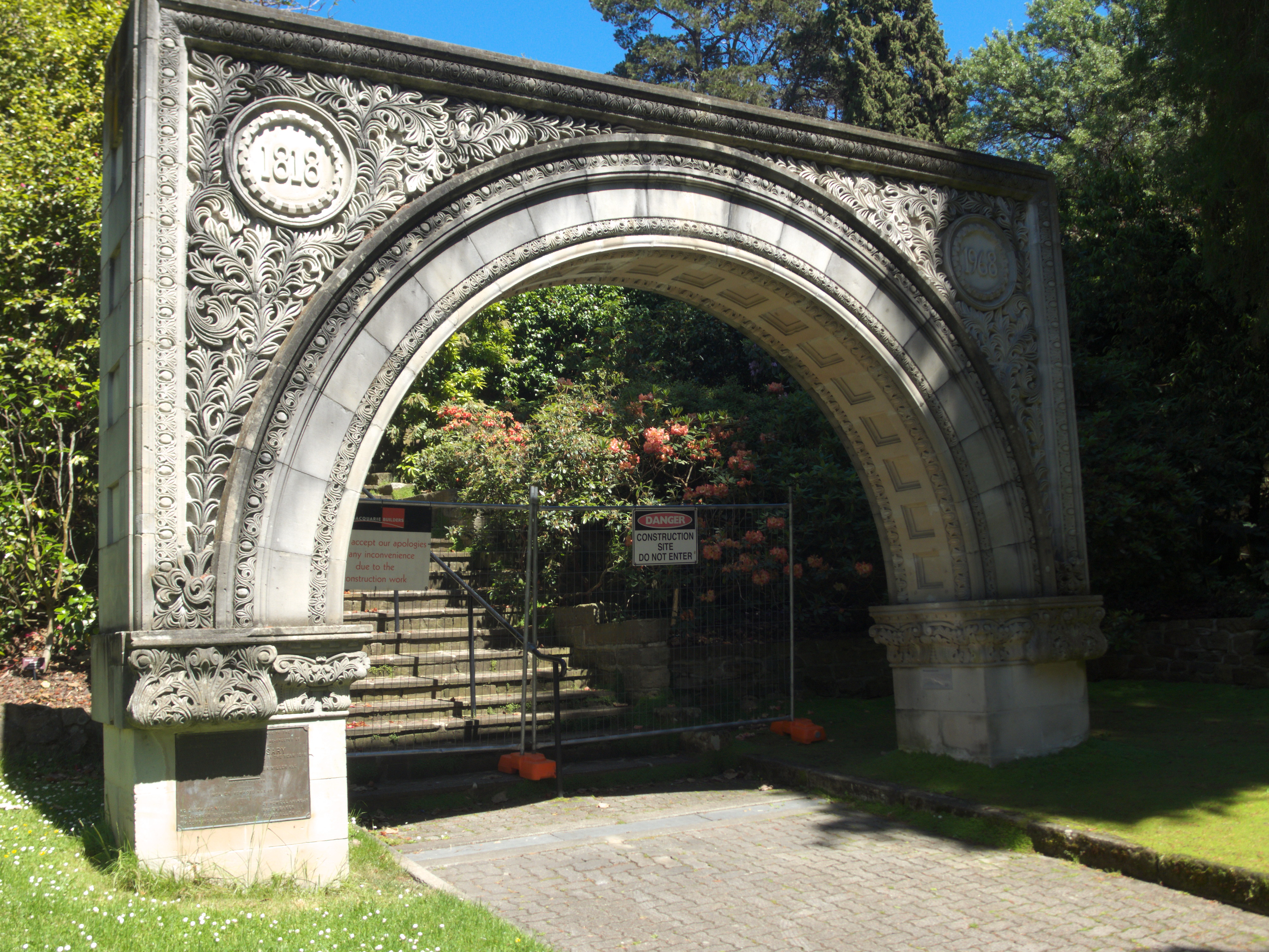
The Anniversary Arch donated to the gardens in 1968

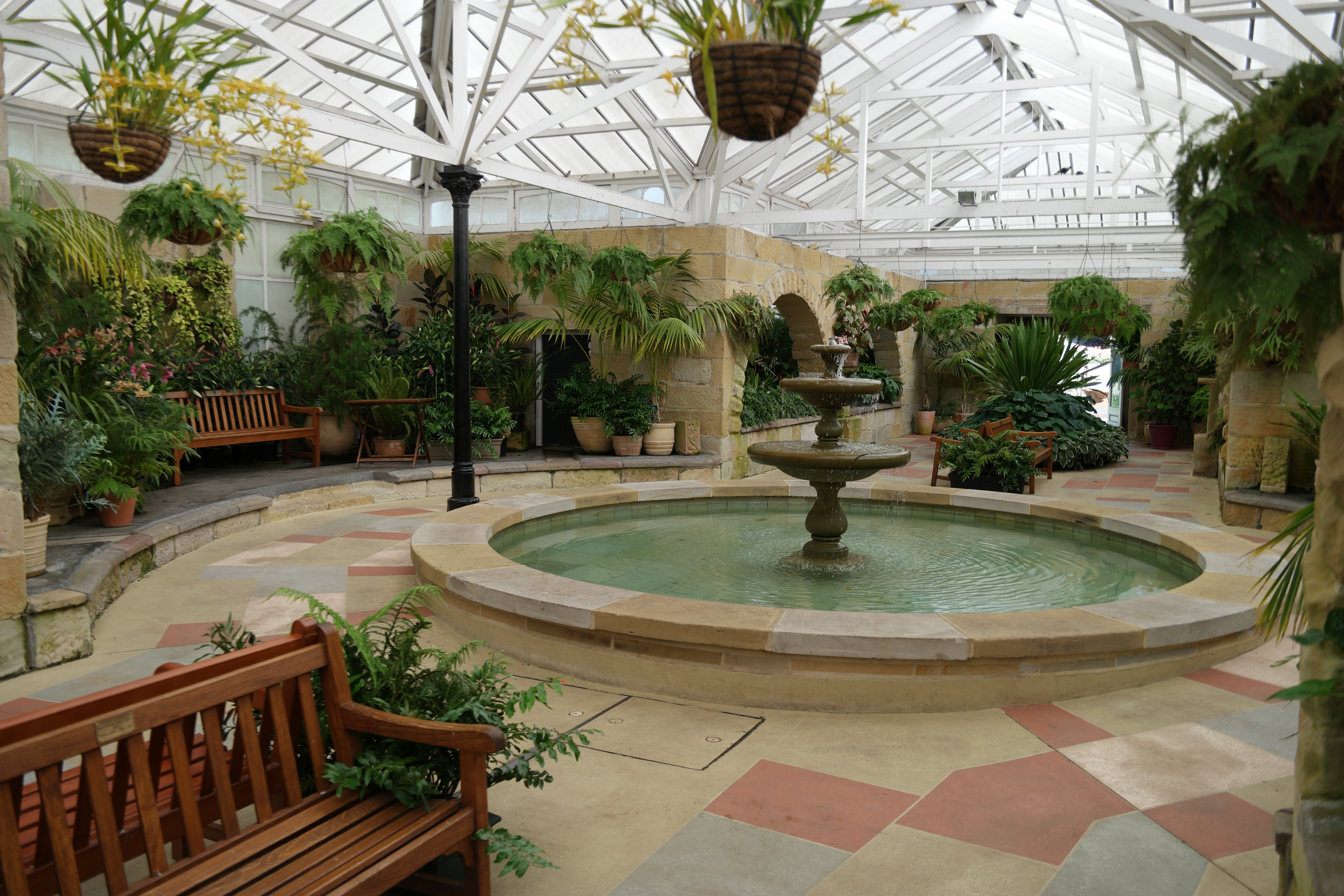
The Conservatory

The Royal Tasmanian Botanical Gardens (RTBG), which cover an area of approximately 14 hectares (34.6 acres), in Hobart located within the Queens Domain.

== History ==
The gardens were established in 1818 and is the second oldest Botanical Gardens in Australia – the Sydney Botanic gardens were founded two years earlier. The land was originally occupied by the Muwinina people. Archaeological excavations have uncovered extensive shell middens and stone artifacts dating back more than 5000 years.

== Gardens ==
The Gardens hold historic plant collections and a large number of significant trees, many dating back to the nineteenth century. It also has an increasing number of important conservation collections of Tasmanian plants, of which the King's Lomatia is one of the most unusual, and the world's only Subantarctic Plant House. Here, plants from subantarctic islands in high southern latitudes are displayed in a climatically-controlled environment, where chilly fogs and mists mirror the wet, cold conditions of their island homes. The plants of the Subantarctic Plant House have been collected by Gardens staff and associated scientists on field trips to Macquarie Island.

The visitor centre houses a restaurant, souvenir shop, and a gallery with regularly changing displays by local artists, together with a display area containing the Gardens' own exhibitions.

Prior to European settlement, local Aboriginal tribes used the site, and traces of their occupation are still apparent.

From 1996, the Gardens have contained The Patch, a working display garden which regularly appears on Gardening Australia.

== Community Interaction ==
The Royal Tasmanian Botanical Gardens support the local community; they hosted an exhibition in February 2011 of photos created by students at OAK Community Services.

In early 2011 the Gardens played host to Power Plant , a sound and light show that came straight from a sell out season in Hong Kong. The show was installed into the gardens as part of the Ten Days on the Island 2011 Festival.

== Education ==
- The Royal Tasmanian Botanical Gardens are dedicated to educating people about plants and the environment. One of their major educational annual events is Growing Your Future, a career event that brings together a variety of organisations and businesses with students to expand students' perceptions and horizons. In 2012 the event is planned to be held on 27 April.
- The Royal Tasmanian Gardens are also part of the Growing our Future, Growing the NBN partnership. The project aims to deliver horticulture training to students from all around Tasmania.
Royal Tasmanian Botanical Gardens

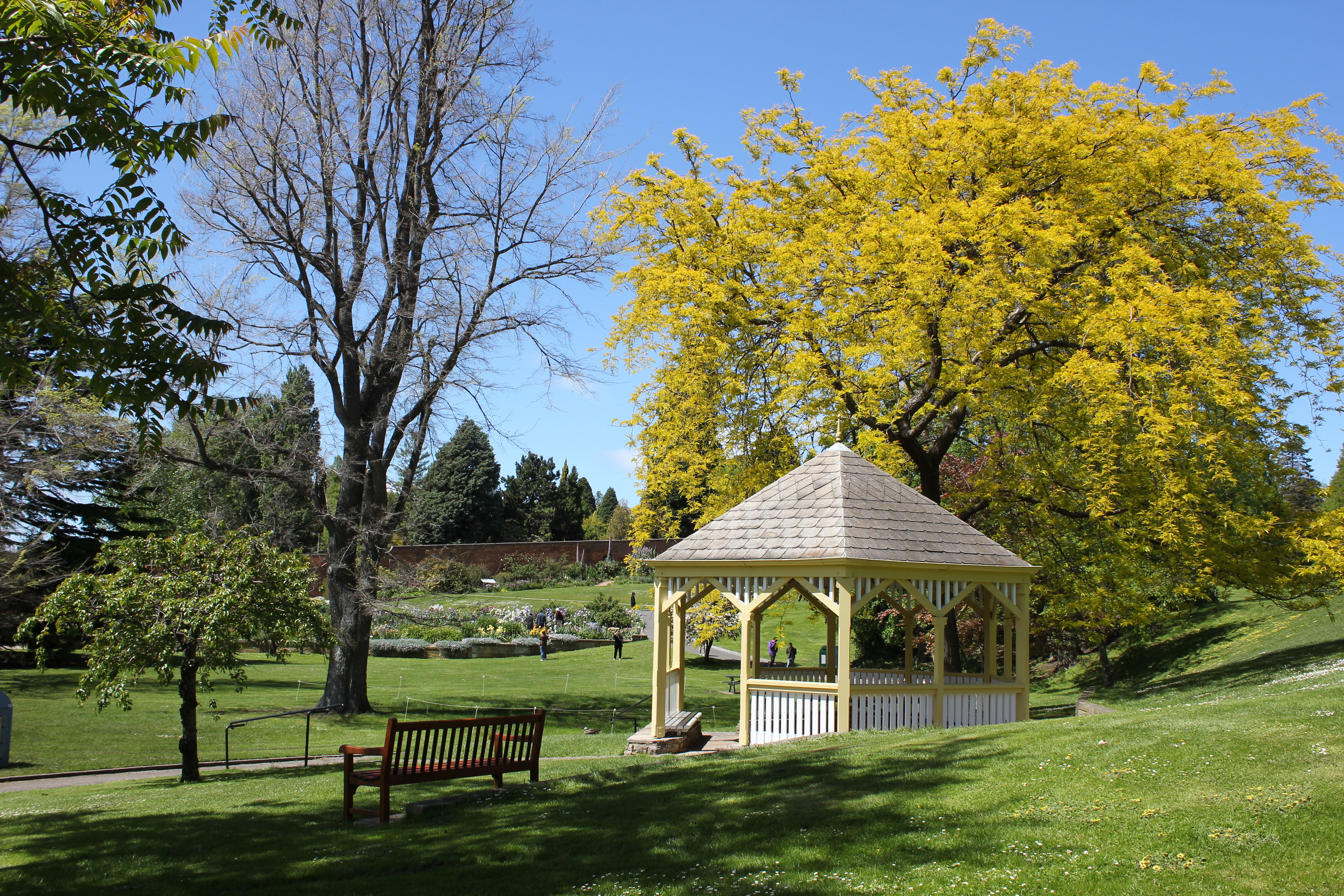

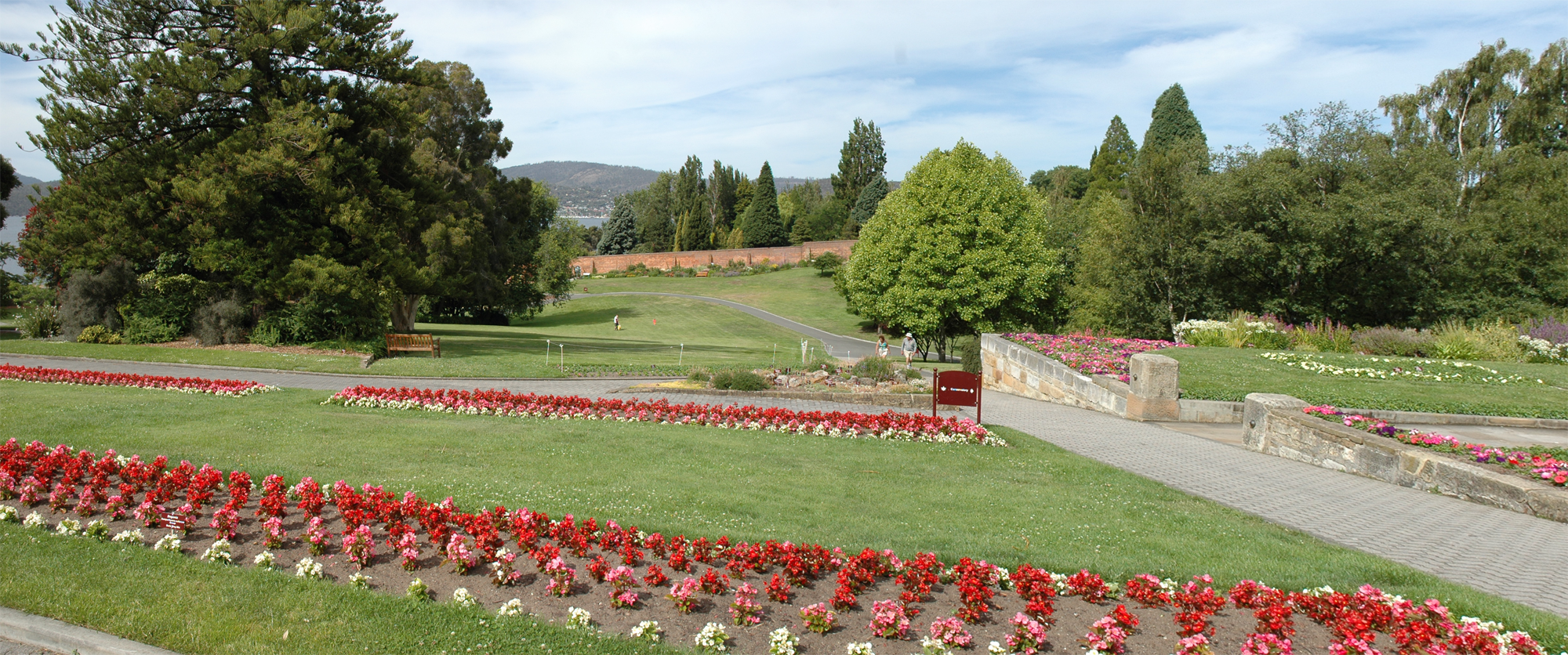
