= Queens Domain =

Urban parkland and cultural precinct in Hobart, Australia

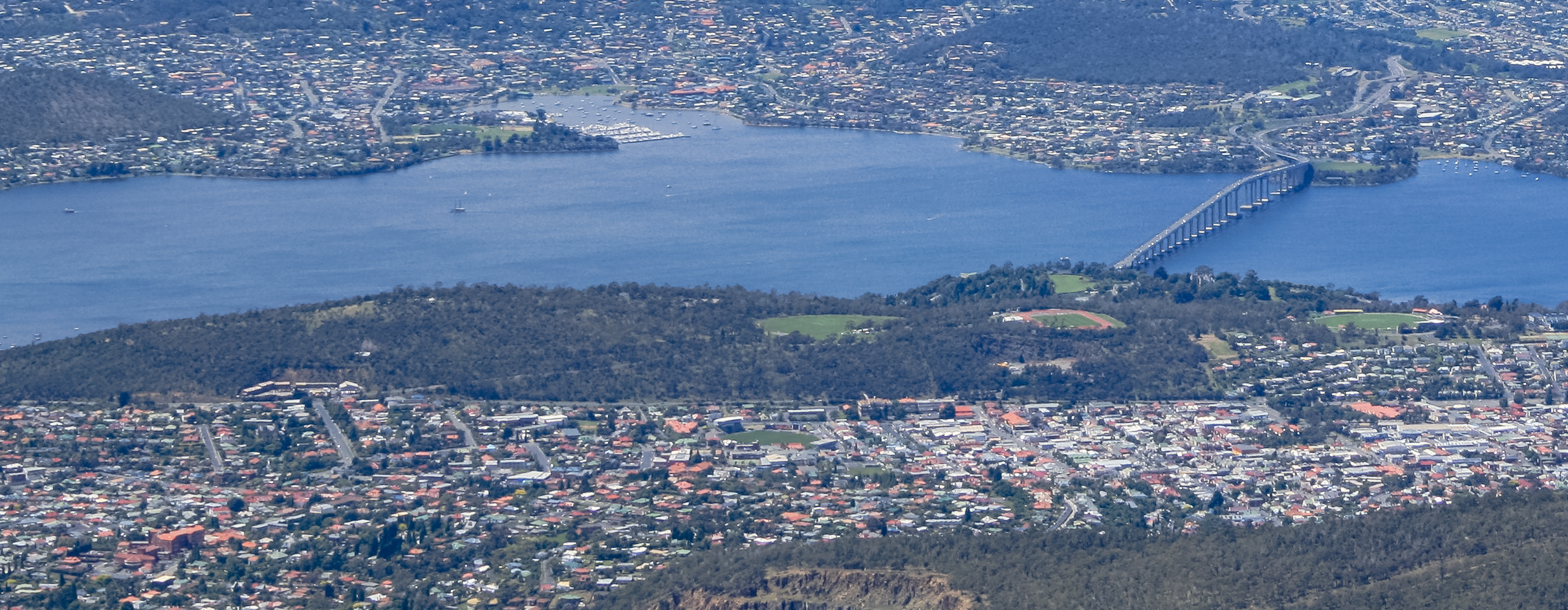
- Interactive map of Queens Domain
- Type: Urban park
- Location: Hobart, Tasmania
- Coordinates: 42.868322°S 147.329548°E
- Area: 230 hectares (570 acres)
- Created: 1860
- Operator: Hobart City Council
- Visitors: ~2 million annually
- Status: Open all year

The Queens Domain, also known as The Domain to locals, is an expansive 230 ha (570-acre) area of bushland, parkland, and cultural sites located just north-east of the Hobart City Centre, bordering the River Derwent in the state capital of Hobart, Tasmania, Australia. Established in 1860 by gubernatorial decree, the Domain is public land preserved for community use and recreation.

== History ==
Twenty-one Aboriginal sites within the Queens Domain are recorded in the Tasmanian Aboriginal Sites Index (TASI). Most sites are located along the River Derwent foreshore, with some extending inland. The foreshore and remnant grasslands are considered culturally significant to the Tasmanian Aboriginal community. A designated high-sensitivity zone extends from the foreshore to the 50-metre contour. All sites are protected under the Aboriginal Relics Act 1975. Management guidelines ensure the preservation of Aboriginal heritage values in consultation with the Tasmanian Aboriginal Land Council (TALC).

European occupation of the Domain began in 1804 after the colonists abandoned their first camp at Risdon Cove and settled at the site of the current Hobart City Centre. Initially set aside for the pleasure and profit of the Governor of the colony, the Queens Domain gradually evolved into a developed public space with a rich and layered history. Throughout the 19th and early 20th centuries, the Domain was used for a variety of purposes, including housing abattoirs, quarrying building materials, agisting animals, growing food, boat building, storing munitions, and accommodating the Governor of Tasmania.

Over time, the Domain became increasingly isolated from the river and adjacent city and residential areas. The construction of a rail line in 1875 severed the connection to the River Derwent, and further disconnection occurred in 1943 with the creation of a link road between the floating bridge and the city, which later expanded into an extension of the Tasman Highway. The construction of the Brooker Highway in 1961 along the length of Park Street reinforced this separation.

Despite extensive development, the Domain retains nationally significant remnants of its original grassy woodland landscape. Amongst the seven native plant communities mapped within the area, two are considered particularly rare. Lowland Themeda triandra grasslands are listed as ‘Critically Endangered’ under the Environment Protection and Biodiversity Conservation Act 1999 (EPBC Act), and Eucalyptus globulus forest and woodlands are listed as ‘Threatened’ under the Nature Conservation Act 2002. These communities support over 130 native plant species, with several classified as endangered or vulnerable under conservation legislation.

The Domain’s role as a public recreational space expanded over time with the establishment of carriage drives, botanical gardens, a zoo, baths, sporting facilities, ceremonial spaces, and event venues. after the colonists abandoned their first camp at Risdon Cove and settled in Hobart. Initially reserved for the pleasure and profit of the Governor, the Domain has undergone significant transformation over time. It has served various utilitarian purposes, including housing abattoirs, quarries, food production, and military storage. It also accommodated residential areas and the Governor’s residence. Over time, the Domain evolved into a public space, hosting carriage drives, botanical gardens, a zoo, baths, sporting facilities, and ceremonial spaces. However, infrastructure developments have progressively isolated the Domain from the city and river, including the 1875 railway, the 1943 floating bridge link road (now the Tasman Highway), and the 1961 Brooker Highway.

== Historic and cultural facilities ==
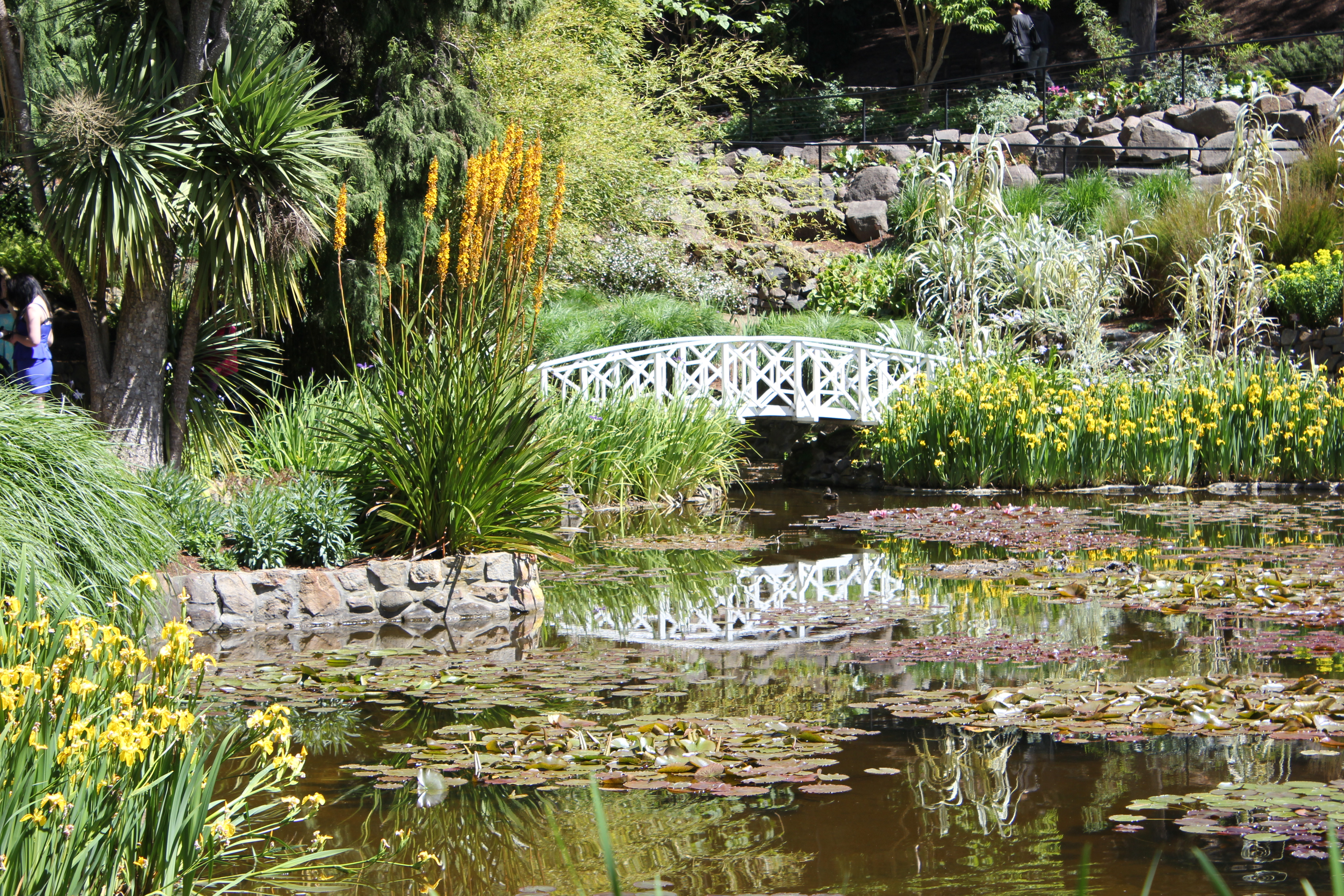
Royal Tasmanian Botanical Gardens, c. 2013

The Domain is home to several significant institutions and recreational facilities:

- Government House – One of the most stately residences in the Commonwealth of Nations, serving as the official residence of the Governor of Tasmania.
- Royal Tasmanian Botanical Gardens – The second-oldest botanical gardens in Australia, featuring diverse plant collections, including a conservatory, heritage plantings, and Tasmania’s only subantarctic plant house.
- Hobart Cenotaph – A war memorial dedicated to Tasmanians who served in global conflicts, prominently situated overlooking the river.
- Hobart Zoo (former) – The original site of Hobart’s zoological gardens, which operated from 1923 until its closure in 1937. The site where the last captive thylacine perished in 1936. The site is currently closed to the general public.
- Queen Victoria Gunpowder Magazine – Erected in 1845 with convict labor, the historic gunpowder storeroom is currently closed to the general public.

== Sports and recreation ==
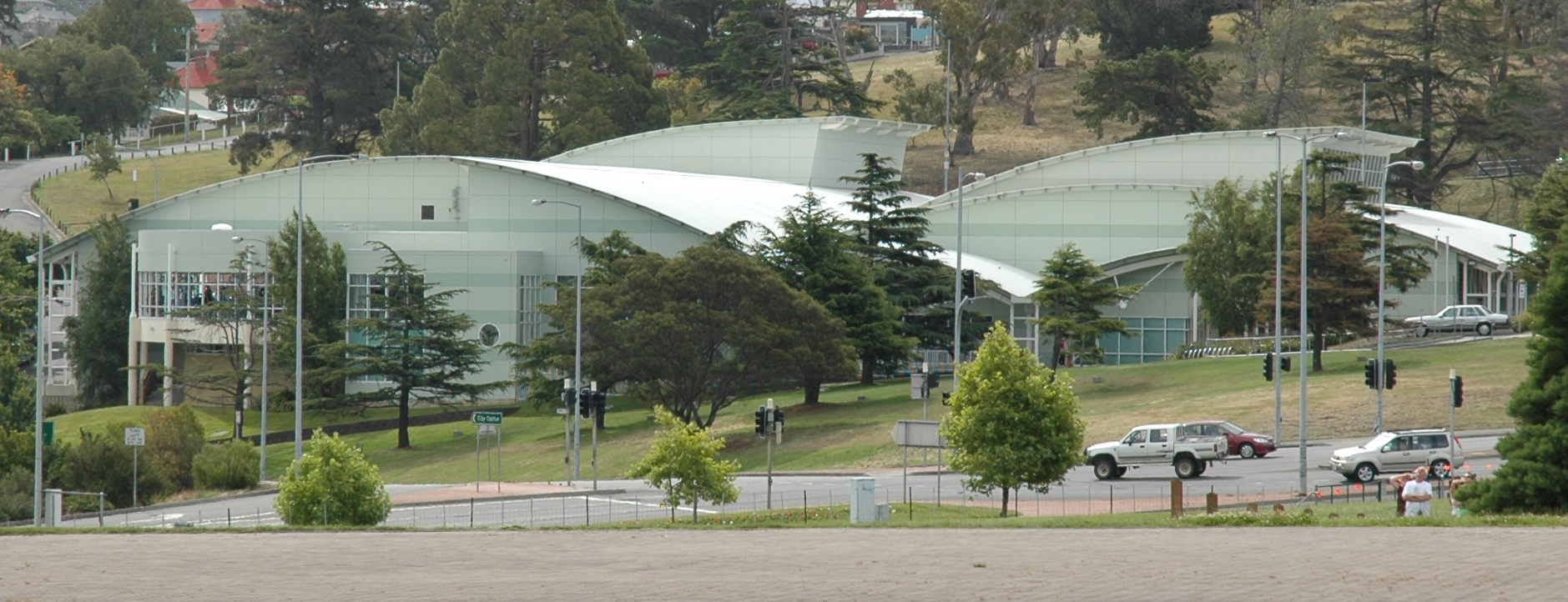
Hobart Aquatic Centre

The Domain contains several major sporting complexes:

- Domain Athletic Centre – A modern facility catering to athletics and track-and-field events.
- Doone Kennedy Hobart Aquatic Centre – A state-of-the-art swimming and fitness facility used for competition and community use.
- Hobart International Tennis Centre – A premier tennis venue, home to the Hobart International tournament.
- Soldiers Memorial Oval sporting field area – twin oval sports ground encompassing the Domain Crossroads Oval and the Soldiers Memorial Oval.
- TCA Ground – A historic cricket and Australian rules football ground.

Additionally, the Domain features numerous walking and cycling tracks, picnic areas, barbecue facilities, public toilets, and open spaces for community events and gatherings, such as the Legacy Park Community Hub, a large adventure play space suitable for children of all ages, and an outdoor amphitheatre.

== Geography and environment ==
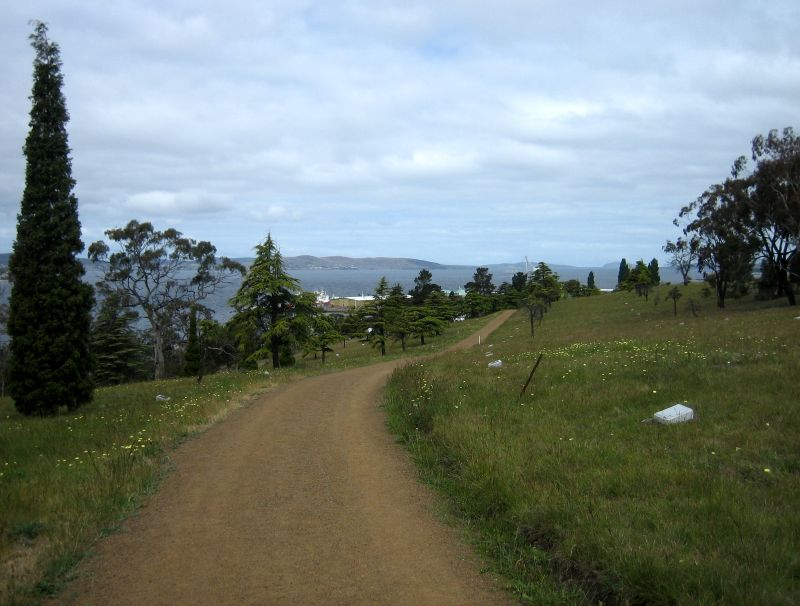
Soldier's Walk in Hobart, with a tree and plaque for each soldier lost in the Great War.

The highest point of the Domain reaches approximately 136 metres (446 ft), with a prominent radio mast nearby. The landscape comprises native bushland, open parklands, and historic sites.

Despite significant development, the Domain retains nationally significant remnants of its original grassy woodland landscape. Two of its seven native plant communities are classified as rare:

- Lowland Themeda triandra grasslands – Listed as ‘Critically Endangered’ under the Environment Protection and Biodiversity Conservation Act 1999 (EPBC Act).
- Eucalyptus globulus forest and woodlands – Listed as ‘Threatened’ under the Nature Conservation Act 2002.

These ecosystems support over 130 native plant species, including three listed as endangered or vulnerable under the EPBC Act and 16 classified as rare or threatened under the Threatened Species Protection Act 1995. The Domain’s landscape, with its distinctive grassy hues and silver-grey trees, contributes to Hobart’s natural character.

== Exotic gardens and significant plantings ==
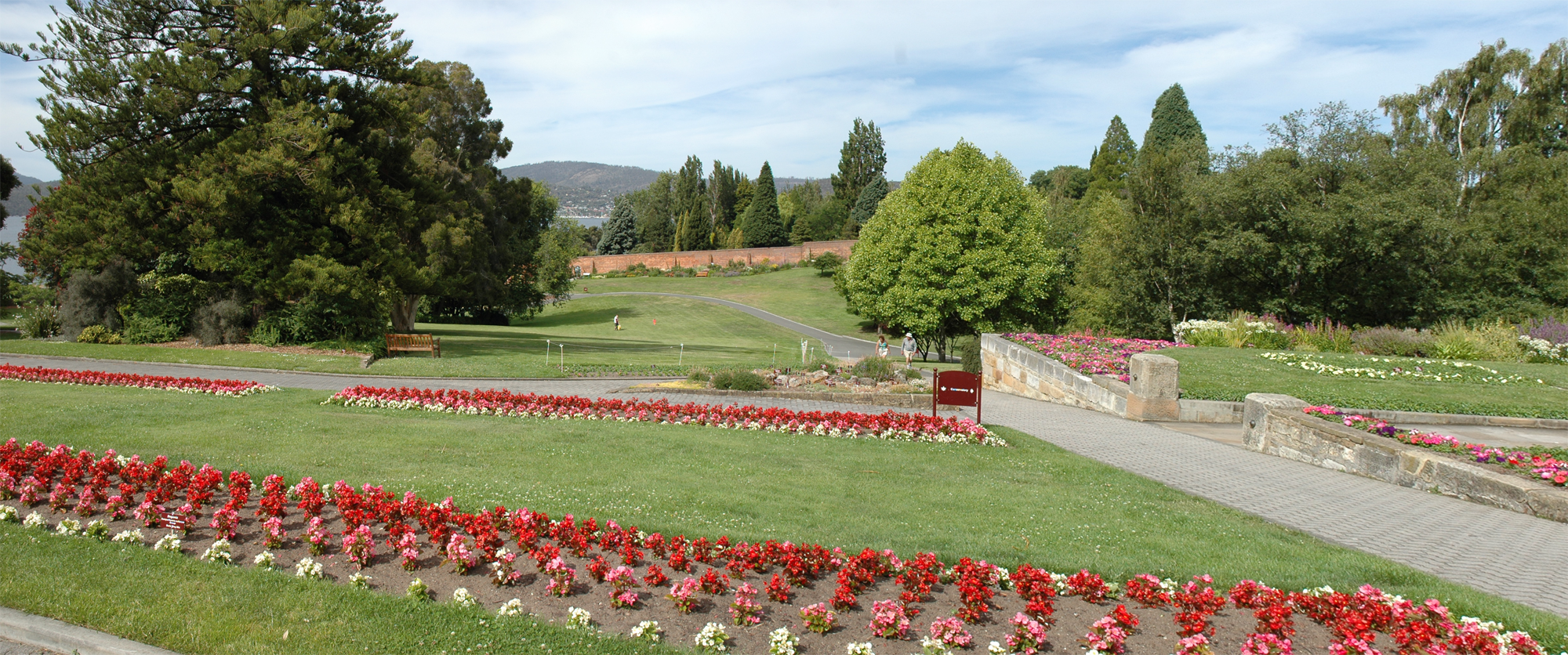
Flower rows at the Royal Tasmanian Botanical Gardens, c. 2007

In contrast to its native landscapes, parts of the Domain feature historic exotic gardens planted in the Victorian era to create a ‘park-like’ setting. Significant gardens exist around the Royal Tasmanian Botanical Gardens, Government House, the University grounds, and the Phillip Smith Centre. Extensive tree plantings along key roads and driveways, such as Davies Avenue and Soldiers Memorial Avenue, further define the Domain’s character. Over 50 trees in the Domain are listed on the City of Hobart’s Significant Tree Register. Notably, the Royal Tasmanian Botanical Gardens hosts 230 conifer species, representing one of the world’s most diverse collections.
