= List of mayors of Port Phillip =

Mayor of Port Phillip
- Incumbent; Alex Makin since 14 November 2025
- Appointer: Port Phillip City Council
- Term length: 1 or 2 years
- Inaugural holder: Liana Thompson
- Formation: 21 March 1996
- Deputy: Louise Crawford

This is a list of the mayors of the City of Port Phillip local government area, a local government area in Melbourne, Victoria, Australia, which was formed following the amalgamation of the City of Port Melbourne, City of South Melbourne and the City of St Kilda in 1994.

The current mayor is Cr. Alex Makin.

== Mayors ==
=== 1996–present ===
No.	Portrait	Mayor (Ward)	Party	Term start	Term end
1		Liana Thompson	Labor	21 March 1996	21 March 1997
2		Christine Häag	Independent	21 March 1997	6 April 1998
3		Dick Gross	Labor	6 April 1998	24 March 1999
3		Dick Gross	Labor	24 March 1999	31 March 2000
4		Julian Hill	Labor	31 March 2000	30 March 2001
4		Julian Hill	Labor	30 March 2001	20 March 2002
5		Darren Ray	Independent	20 March 2002	17 March 2003
6		Liz Johnstone	Independent	17 March 2003	17 March 2004
(3)		Dick Gross	Labor	17 March 2004	2 December 2004 (Note: From 1996 until 2004, the annual election of the mayor for the following 12 months occurred in March. New legislation effective from 2004 onwards changed the date of the election of the mayor to November or December. There was a truncated transitional term of office from March to November 2004.)
(5)		Darren Ray	Independent	2 December 2004	8 December 2005
7		Janet Bolitho	Independent Labor	8 December 2005	7 December 2006
7		Janet Bolitho	Independent Labor	7 December 2006	6 December 2007
8		Janet Cribbes	Independent	November 2007	November 2008
9		Frank O'Connor	Independent	8 December 2008	7 December 2009
9		Frank O'Connor	Independent	7 December 2009	6 December 2010
10		Rachel Powning	Independent	6 December 2010	5 December 2011
10		Rachel Powning	Independent	5 December 2011	7 November 2012
11		Amanda Stevens	Labor	7 November 2012	12 November 2013
11		Amanda Stevens	Labor	12 November 2013	11 November 2014
11		Amanda Stevens	Labor	11 November 2014	26 February 2015
11		Amanda Stevens	Independent Labor	26 February 2015	10 November 2015
12		Bernadene Voss	Independent	10 November 2015	10 November 2016
12		Bernadene Voss	Independent	10 November 2016	8 November 2017
12		Bernadene Voss	Independent	8 November 2017	28 November 2018
(3)		Dick Gross (Canal)	Labor	28 November 2018	13 November 2019
(12)		Bernadene Voss	Independent	13 November 2019	11 November 2020
13		Louise Crawford (Canal)	Labor	11 November 2020	17 November 2021
14		Marcus Pearl (Gateway)	Liberal	17 November 2021	9 November 2022
15		Heather Cunsolo (Gateway)	Independent	9 November 2022	9 November 2023
15		Heather Cunsolo (Gateway)	Independent	9 November 2023	26 October 2024
16		Louise Crawford (Elwood)	Labor	14 November 2025	13 November 2025
17		Alex Makin (Montague)	Independent	14 November 2025	incumbent

== Deputy mayors ==
=== 2012–present ===
No.	Portrait	Deputy Mayor (Ward)	Party	Term start	Term end	Mayor
1		Serge Thomann	Independent	7 November 2012	12 November 2013	Bosler (Labor/Ind. Labor)
1		Serge Thomann	Independent	12 November 2013	11 November 2014	Bosler (Labor/Ind. Labor)
2		Bernadene Voss	Independent	11 November 2014	10 November 2015	Bosler (Labor/Ind. Labor)
(1)		Serge Thomann	Independent	10 November 2015	10 November 2016	Voss (CAPP)
3		Katherine Copsey	Greens	10 November 2016	8 November 2017	Voss (CAPP)
4		Dick Gross (Canal)	Labor	8 November 2017	28 November 2018	Voss (CAPP)
5		Louise Crawford (Canal)	Labor	28 November 2018	13 November 2019	Gross (Labor)
6		Tim Baxter (Canal)	Greens	13 November 2019	11 November 2020	Voss (CAPP)
7		Marcus Pearl (Gateway)	Liberal	11 November 2020	17 November 2021	Crawford (Labor)
(6)		Tim Baxter (Canal)	Greens	17 November 2021	9 November 2022	Pearl (Liberal)
8		Andrew Bond (Lake)	Liberal	9 November 2022	9 November 2023	Cunsolo (Independent)
(5)		Louise Crawford (Canal)	Labor	9 November 2023	26 October 2024	Cunsolo (Independent)
8		Bryan Mears (Lakeside)	Independent	16 November 2024	incumbent	Crawford (Labor)

== See also ==
- City of Port Phillip
- List of town halls in Melbourne
- Local government areas of Victoria
- Port Melbourne Town Hall
- South Melbourne Town Hall
- St Kilda Town Hall
