= Port Melbourne Town Hall =

Town hall in Melbourne, Australia

Coordinates: 37.835708°S 144.944429°E

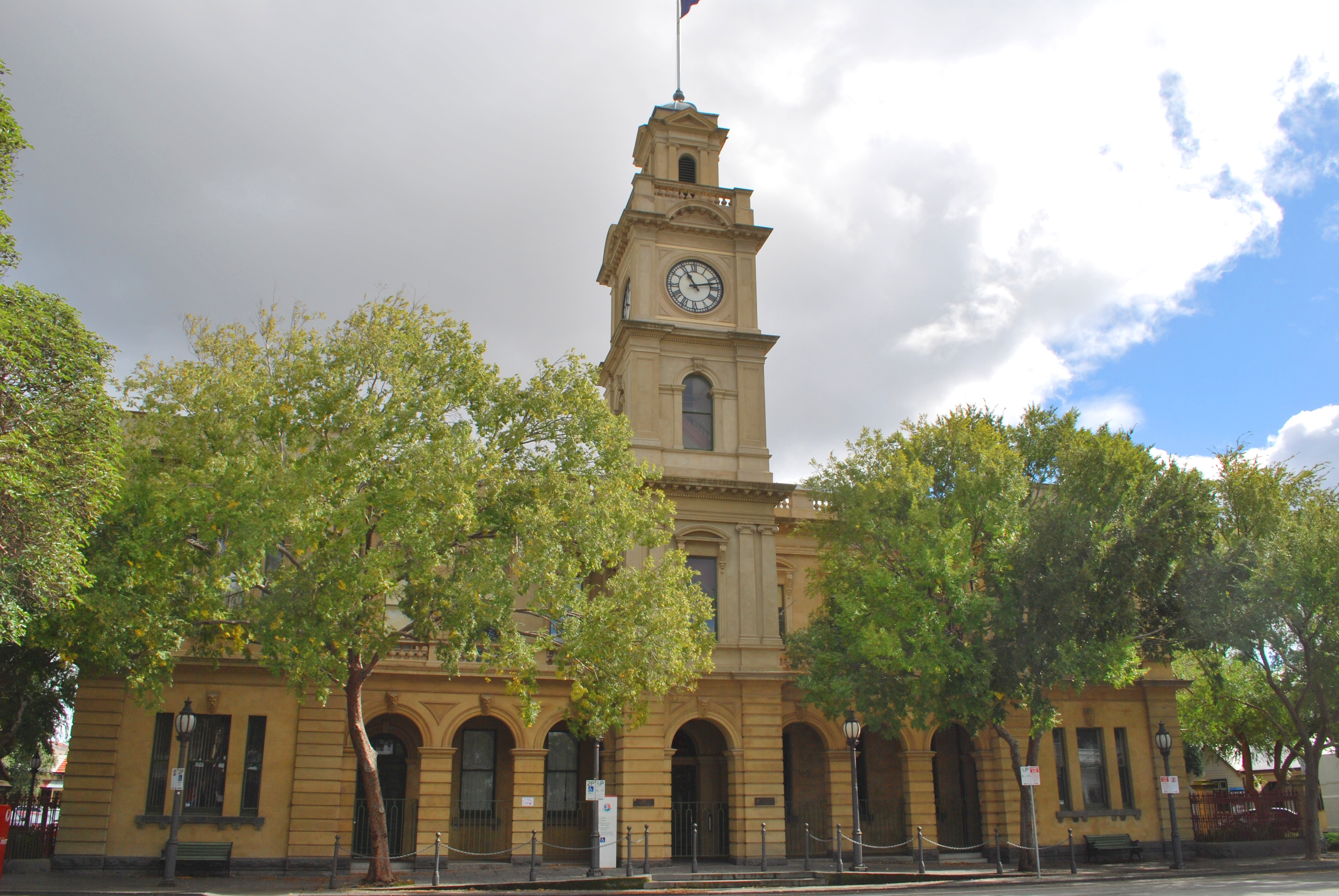
Port Melbourne Town Hall Bay Street facade

The Port Melbourne Town Hall was erected in 1882. The Town Hall is an important element in the historic Bay Street streetscape of inner city Port Melbourne.

After the amalgamation of the City of Port Melbourne with the City of South Melbourne and the City of St Kilda in 1994 to form the City of Port Phillip, the Town Hall now functions as secondary offices for the Port Phillip City Council of the new City of Port Phillip.

== Architecture ==
The architect J. J. Wild employed a free Classical Revival style architectural motifs in the form of two projecting end pavilions and a central tower, unified at ground floor level by an arcaded loggia surmounted by balustrading. The cast iron fencing at the sides is in very good condition.

The Town Hall survives substantially intact as shown in an illustration of 1882, except that the cement render has been painted. The facade of the rear 1915 wing survives in its original condition.

== See also ==
- List of Town Halls in Melbourne
