= Thomas Smith (Australian politician) =

Australian politician

Councillor of the City of Port Melbourne
- In office August 1902 – 5 August 1925

Mayor of Port Melbourne
- In office 1906–1907
- In office 1914–1915
- In office 1920–1921

Member of the Victorian Legislative Assembly for Emerald Hill
- In office April 1889 – 1 June 1904

Councillor of the City of South Melbourne for Beaconsfield Ward
- In office 1885–1901

Mayor of South Melbourne
- In office 1888–1888

Personal details
- Born: Warton, England
- Died: 5 August 1925 Melbourne, Australia
- Party: Labor (from 1895)
- Other political affiliations: Political Labour League (until 1895)

Thomas Smith (1846 – 5 August 1925) was an Australian politician. He was a member of the Victorian Legislative Assembly from 1889 to 1904, representing the electorate of Emerald Hill; having been elected before the development of a party system, he joined the Labor Party in the mid-1890s. He also served as mayor of both the City of South Melbourne and City of Port Melbourne.

Smith was born in Warton in Warwickshire, England and moved to Melbourne with his family as a child in 1856. He followed his father into the hatting trade, apprenticing and then working as a journeyman in that field, during which time he became treasurer of the Silk Hatters' Union. He opened his own hat business in South Melbourne in 1871, later expanding to a second location in Port Melbourne. Smith was elected to the City of South Melbourne council in 1885 and served for sixteen years, including a term as mayor in 1888–1889. He was also appointed a justice of the peace in 1888 and was a Commissioner of the 1888-89 Melbourne Centennial International Exhibition. Other business interests included being a founder of the Enterprise Permanent Building Society of South Melbourne and a director of the T & G Mutual Life Assurance Society and Globe Motor Company.

Smith was elected to the Victorian Legislative Assembly as the member for Emerald Hill in 1889. He was one of a number of candidates endorsed for re-election by the Political Labour League in 1892, but defeated an endorsed Labor candidate in 1894. He appears to have joined the Labor Party c. 1895 and was re-elected as an endorsed Labor candidate for the first time in 1897. He retired in 1904 after an electoral redistribution abolished his seat of Emerald Hill and divided its territory between the existing seats of Albert Park and Port Melbourne.

Smith was elected to the City of Port Melbourne council in August 1902, five months after his parliamentary retirement. He served on the Port Melbourne council for 23 years until his death, and was mayor from 1906 to 1907, 1914 to 1915 and 1920 to 1921. He died in Melbourne in 1925 and was buried at Melbourne General Cemetery.

Smith Street in South Melbourne, Smith Street in Port Melbourne and Smith Reserve in Port Melbourne are all named after Smith.
