= Richard Gross =

Richard Gross may refer to:

- Dick Gross (born 1954), Australian politician
- Richard Gross (sculptor) (1882–1964), New Zealand sculptor
