= Percy Heather =

Australian cricketer

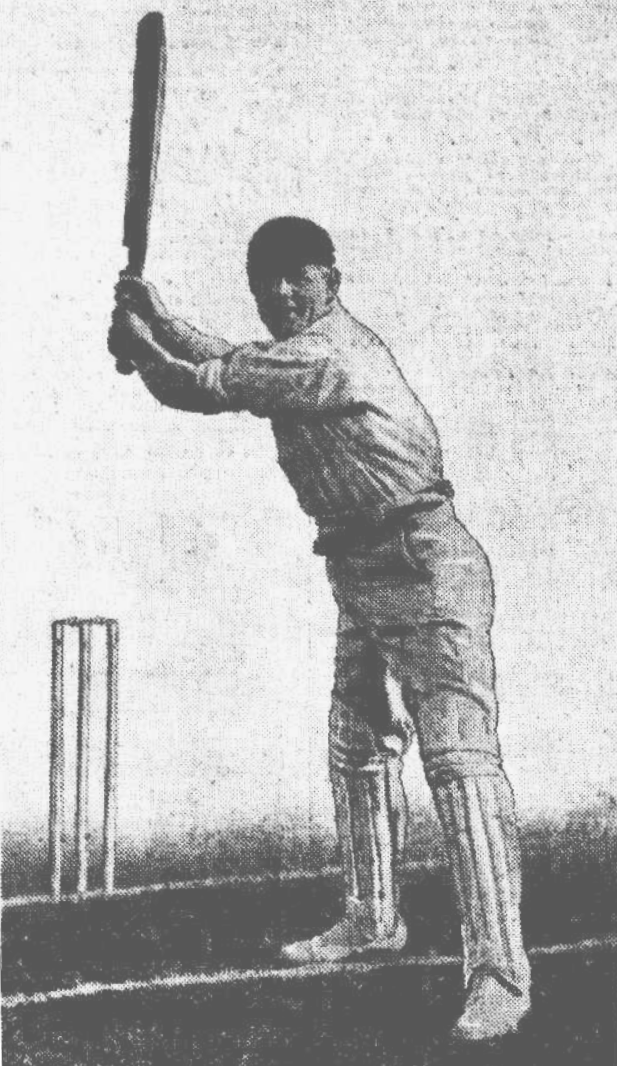

Personal information
- Full name: Percival Jackson Heather
- Born: 6 October 1882; Melbourne, Australia
- Died: 29 June 1956 (aged 73); Melbourne, Australia
- Batting: Right-handed
- Relatives: Edward Heather (father)

Domestic team information
- Years: Team
- 1904–05: Natal
- 1910–11 to 1912–13: Transvaal
- 1913–14: Victoria

Career statistics
Competition	First-class
Matches	13
Runs scored	673
Batting average	39.58
100s/50s	1/6
Top score	109 not out
Balls bowled	463
Wickets	10
Bowling average	29.70
5 wickets in innings	0
10 wickets in match	0
Best bowling	3/39
Catches/stumpings	3/0
- Source: Cricinfo, 30 December 2016

Percival Jackson Heather (6 October 1882 – 29 June 1956) was an Australian cricketer who played 13 matches of first-class cricket between 1904 and 1914.

Born in Melbourne, Heather went to South Africa in 1902, joining the South African Constabulary under the command of Robert Baden-Powell. A forceful batsman, good change bowler and brilliant fieldsman who could also keep wicket, Heather played for Natal and Transvaal. After returning to Australia in 1913 he played one match for Victoria in 1913–14.

His highest first-class score was 109 not out for Transvaal against Border in 1910–11. In a low-scoring match Transvaal needed 165 to win and were 27 for 3 when Heather went to the crease. Batting only 65 minutes, he hit seven fours and nine sixes to take Transvaal to victory by six wickets.

== See also ==
- List of Victoria first-class cricketers
