= City of Port Phillip =

Local government area in Australia

Coordinates: 37°51′S 144°58′E

- Local government area
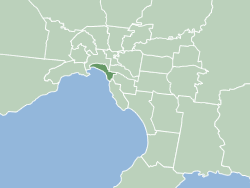

- Interactive map of City of Port Phillip
- Country: Australia
- State: Victoria
- Region: Greater Melbourne
- Established: 1994
- Council seat: St Kilda

Government
  - Mayor: Cr. Alex Makin
  - State electorates: Albert Park; Brighton; Caulfield; Prahran
  - Federal division: Macnamara

Area
  - Total: 20.7 km^{2} (8.0 sq mi)

Population
  - Total: 109,515 (2023)
  - Density: 4,871.1/km^{2} (12,616/sq mi)
LGAs around City of Port Phillip
Melbourne	Melbourne	Stonnington
Melbourne	City of Port Phillip	Glen Eira
Port Phillip	Port Phillip	Bayside

The City of Port Phillip is a local government area of Victoria, Australia, on the northern shores of Port Phillip, south of Melbourne's central business district. It has an area of 20.7 km^{2} and had a population of 109,515 in 2023.

Port Phillip contains a number of varied and substantial retail, entertainment and leisure precincts. These include Bay Street (Port Melbourne), Victoria Avenue (Albert Park), Clarendon Street (South Melbourne), Armstrong Street (Middle Park), Fitzroy Street (St Kilda), Acland Street (St Kilda), Carlisle Street (Balaclava) and Ormond Road (Elwood). A number of significant employment areas lie within Port Phillip, including part of the St Kilda Road business district and industrial, warehousing and manufacturing districts in South Melbourne and Port Melbourne. The city has experienced a significant amount of residential development in the 1990s, particularly in areas close to the foreshore. Port Phillip is well served by public transport with a substantial tram network, the St Kilda and Port Melbourne tram lines and two stations on the Sandringham railway line, in addition to bus services.

Comprising nine single member wards, it is predominantly an amalgamation of three former cities – St Kilda, parts of South Melbourne, most of Port Melbourne, as well as a small portion of Windsor from the former City of Prahran.

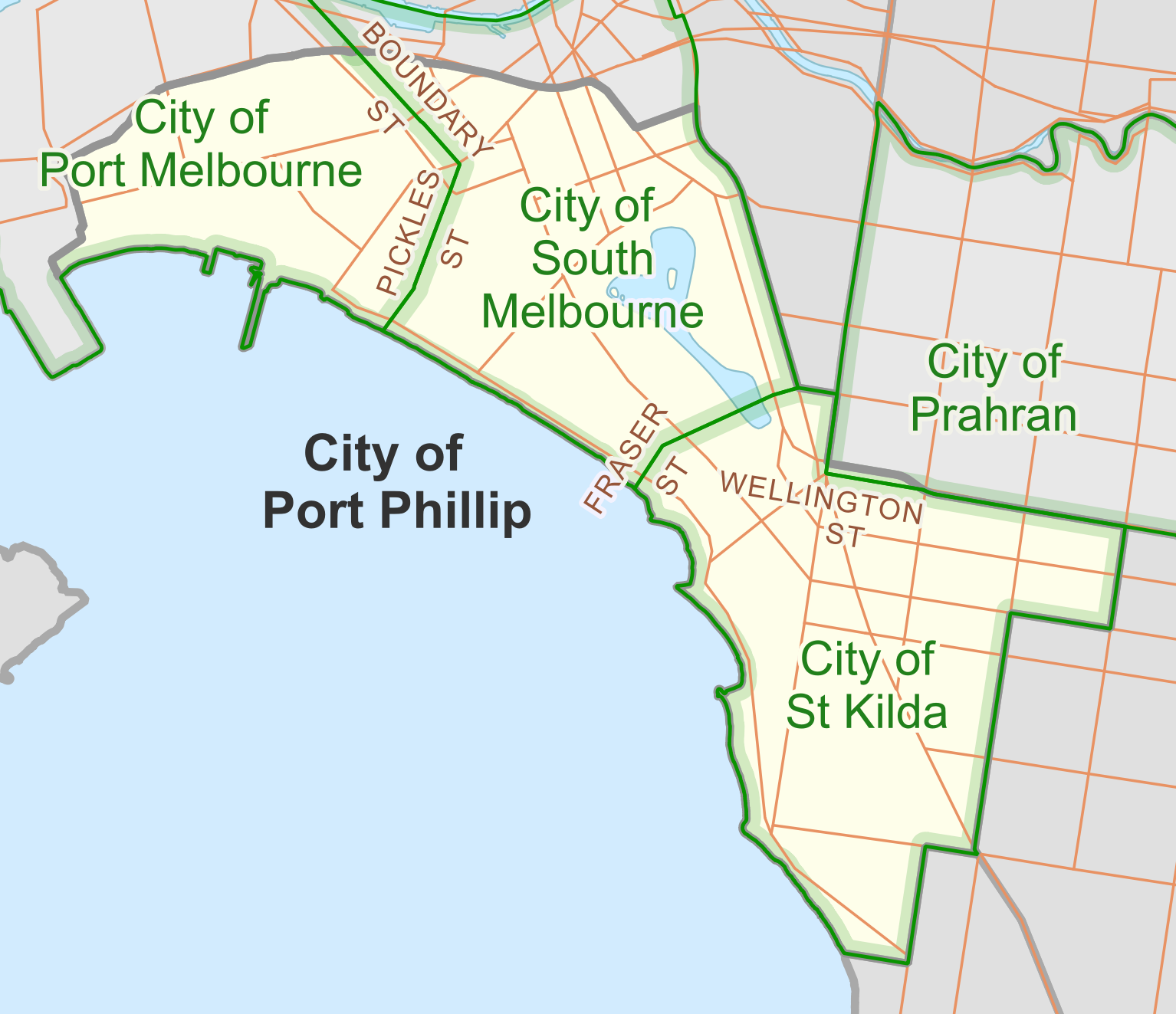
A map of the City of Port Phillip showing the predecessor LGAs that overlapped the area before the 1994 local government amalgamations

The city was created with its present borders in June 1994 under the municipal restructure by the state government. It is bounded by White Reserve and Todd Road to the west, the West Gate Freeway, Kings Way and Dorcas Street to the north, St Kilda Road, High Street, Punt Road, Queens Way, Dandenong Road, Orrong Road, Inkerman Street, Hotham Street, Glen Huntly Road, St Kilda Street and Head Street generally to the east and the foreshore of Port Phillip to the south. Adjacent councils include the City of Melbourne, City of Bayside, City of Glen Eira and the City of Stonnington. When first created, the city was administered by three appointed commissioners, headed by Des Clarke. The first council elections were held in March 1996.

Council offices are currently located in the St Kilda Town Hall, Port Melbourne Town Hall and the South Melbourne Town Hall (currently closed for restoration). The council operates several other facilities including local libraries, childcare centres, parks, playgrounds and community centres. In 2020 ANAM was given a long lease to South Melbourne Town Hall and council staff there and a few community groups vacated the building.

== Schools ==
- Albert Park Primary School (Government)
- Elwood Primary School (Government)
- Galilee Regional Primary School (Roman Catholic)
- Middle Park Primary School (Government)
- Port Melbourne Primary School (Government)
- St Kilda Park Primary School (Government)
- St Kilda Primary School (Government)
- Albert Park College (Government)
- Elwood Secondary College (Government)
- Mac.Robertson Girls' High School (High performance government secondary college for girls)
- St Michael's Grammar School (Church of England/Anglican)
- South Melbourne Primary School (Government)
- South Melbourne Park Primary School (Government)
- Port Melbourne Secondary College (Government)

== Offices ==
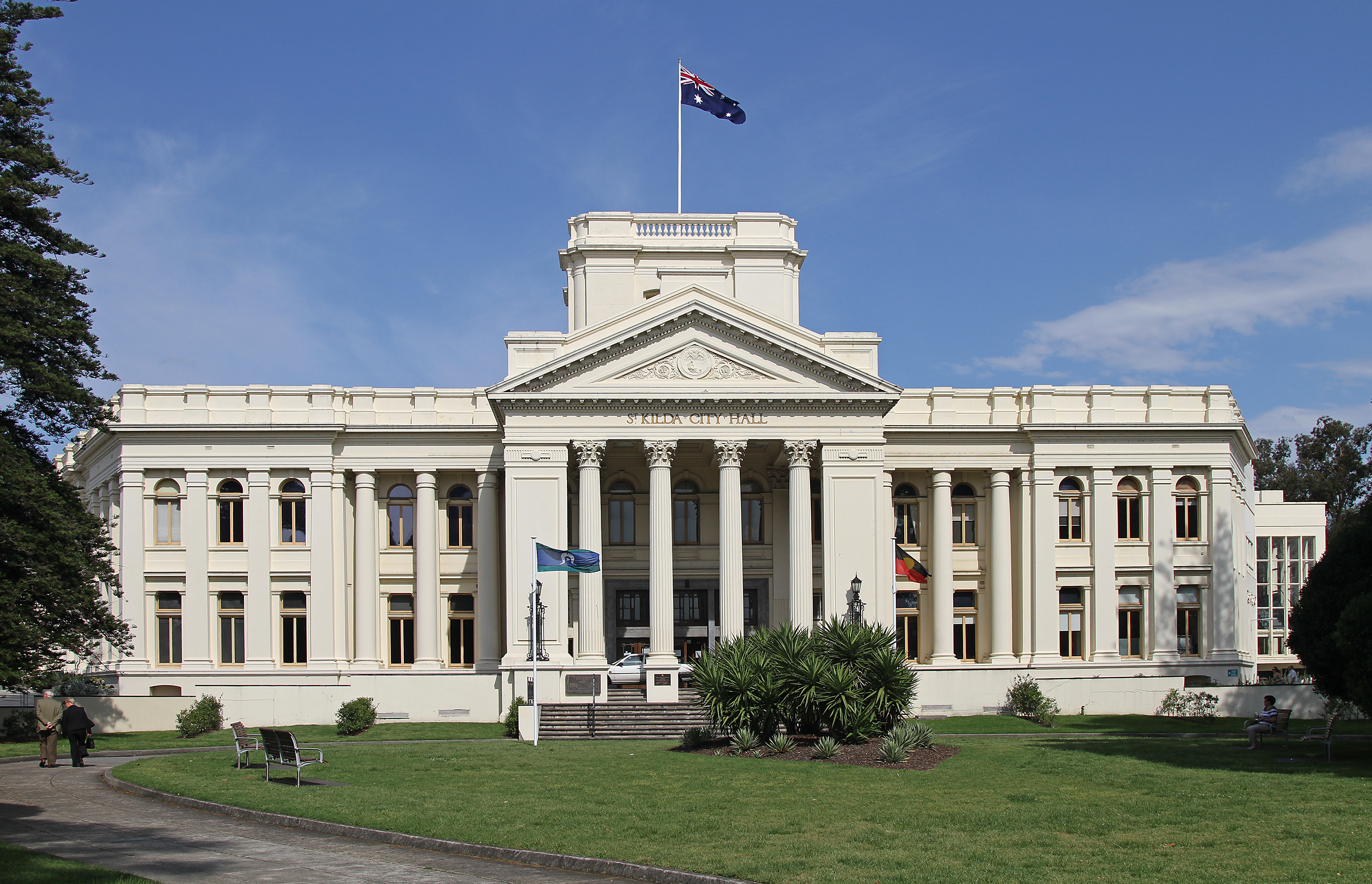
St Kilda Town Hall from entrance gardens

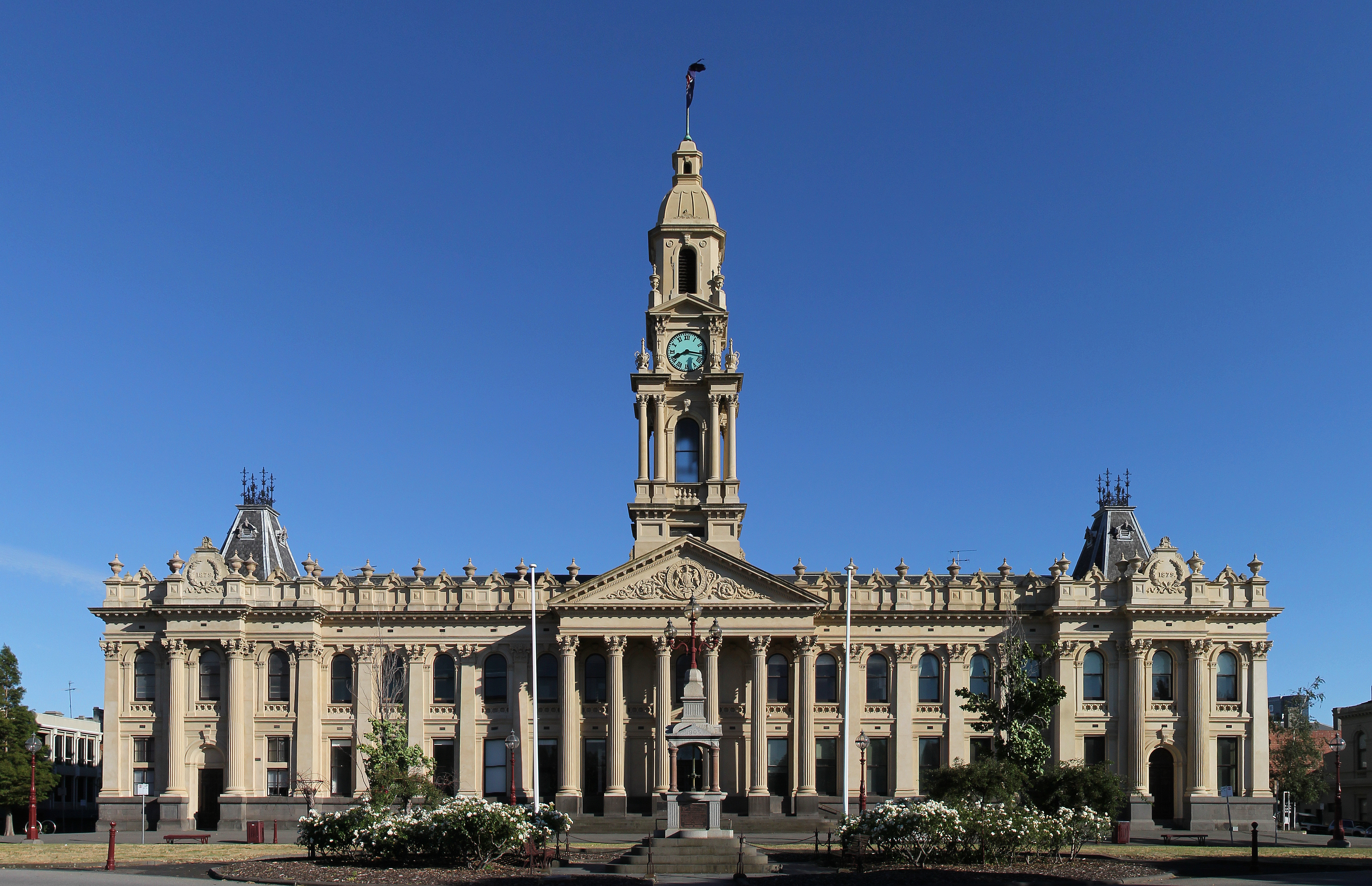
South Melbourne Town Hall

- St Kilda Town Hall
- South Melbourne Town Hall (currently closed for restoration)
- Port Melbourne Town Hall

== Libraries ==
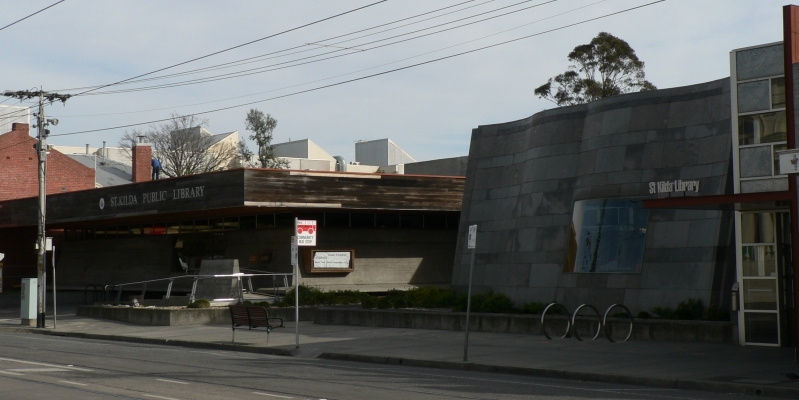
St Kilda Public Library

- Albert Park
- Emerald Hill (South Melbourne)
- Middle Park
- Port Melbourne
- St Kilda

== Notable institutions ==
- 2/10 Medium Regiment, Royal Australian Artillery (Army Reserve, Chapel Street, St Kilda East)
- Australian National Music Academy (South Melbourne, in former City of South Melbourne Town Hall)
- City of Port Phillip Town Hall, St Kilda (Former City of St Kilda Town Hall, Council meetings usually on Wednesday with about 3 meetings per month. Port Phillip Meeting Agenda.)
- Greek Orthodox Archdiocese of Victoria (South Melbourne)
- Hare Krishna Temple (Albert Park)
- South Melbourne Football Club
- Victorian Pride Centre
- 1st Victorian Sea Scout Group regarded as being the first Scout Group in Australia, founded in 1907, and is still currently active hosting Cubs, Scouts and a Venturer Unit based in the Albert Park Reserve

== Notable events ==
- Gay Pride March (Fitzroy Street and Catani Gardens, St Kilda, dykes on bikes, boot scooting, marching groups, music and political activism)
- Australian Formula 1 Grand Prix (Albert Park Circuit), 4-day international motor racing event held in March or April. Includes a Supercars race.
- St Kilda Festival (300,000 people attend this annual music event, Fitzroy Street and Upper Esplanade closed, tram services to the event). This free event now cost ratepayers close to $1.5 million annually.
- St Kilda Film Festival (Australia's Top 100 short films, SoundKILDA: Australia Music Video Competition, international films, forums, Industry Open Day and much more)
- St Kilda Writers Festival (local and international writers compare their skills)
- Admiral Napier Cup, held in the last weekend of August and hosted by the 1st Victorian Sea Scout Group on Albert Park lake, is where Scouts and Venturers gather to participate in rowing, paddling and sailing competitions and recent addition of Iron Person events

== Townships and localities ==
The 2021 census, the city had a population of 101,942 up from 100,863 in the 2016 census

Population
Locality	2016	2021
Albert Park	6,215	6,044
Balaclava	5,396	5,392
Elwood	15,543	15,153
Melbourne CBD^	47,285	54,941
Middle Park	4,143	4,000
Port Melbourne^	16,175	17,633
Ripponlea	1,576	1,532
South Melbourne	10,920	11,548
Southbank^	18,709	22,631
St Kilda	20,230	19,490
St Kilda East^	13,101	12,571
St Kilda West	3,162	2,951
Windsor^	7,281	7,273

^ – Territory divided with another LGA

== Current council composition ==
Since 2024 Port Phillip City Council is composed of nine councillors elected from nine single-member wards, up from seven in 2012. Councillors are elected for a fixed four-year term of office. The mayor is elected by the councillors at the first meeting of the council. The most recent election was held in October 2024.

2024 ward boundaries. Expand the map and click on a ward to see the ward name.

The current council, elected in 2024, in order of election by ward, is as follows:

Ward	Party	Councillor	Notes
Albert Park	Residents of Port Phillip	Rod Hardy	
Alma	Independent	Justin Halliday	
Balaclava	Labor	Libby Buckingham	
Elwood	Labor	Louise Crawford	
Lakeside	Residents of Port Phillip	Bryan Mears	Deputy Mayor
Montague	Independent	Alex Makin	Mayor
Port Melbourne	Independent	Heather Cunsolo	
South Melbourne	Residents of Port Phillip	Beti Jay	
St Kilda	People Empowering Port Phillip	Serge Thomann	

== Election results ==
=== 2024 ===
2024 Victorian local elections: Port Phillip
Party	Votes	%	Swing	Seats	Change
Independent	19,090	36.21	+21.74	3	▲2
Labor	9,213	17.48	−6.24	2	Steady
Greens	9,171	17.40	−3.83	0	▼2
Residents of Port Phillip	7,279	13.81	−1.04	3	▲1
People Empowering Port Phillip	5,465	10.37	+10.37	1	▲1
Independent Liberal	2,038	3.87	−16.49	0	▼2
Victorian Socialists	461	0.87	+0.87	0	Steady
Formal votes	52,717	97.66	+1.57		
Informal votes	1,262	2.34	−1.57		
Total	53,979	100.0		9	
Registered voters / turnout	74,095	72.85	+7.12		

=== 2020 ===
2020 Victorian local elections: Port Phillip
Party	Votes	%	Swing	Seats	Change
Labor	13,228	23.72		2	Steady
Greens	11,881	21.31		2	Steady
Independent Liberal	11,353	20.36		2	Steady
Ratepayers of Port Phillip	8,279	14.85	+14.85	2	▲2
Independent	8,068	14.47		1	Steady
Sustainable Australia	1,559	2.79		0	Steady
Ind. Ratepayers of Port Phillip	482	0.86	+0.86	0	Steady
Formal votes	55,752	96.09	+4.12		
Informal votes	2,269	3.91	−4.12		
Total	58,021	100.0			
Registered voters / turnout	88,268	65.73	+17.13		

== Elected councillors of Port Phillip ==
- Dick Gross (1996–2008, 2016–2020)
- Patricia Brown OAM (1996–1999)
- Christine Haag (1996–1999)
- Freda Erlich (1996–1999)
- Ludwig Stamer (1996–1999) +
- Liz Johnstone (1996–1999)
- Liana Thompson (1996–1999)
- David Brand (1996–1999, 2016–2020)
- Julian Hill (1999–2004)
- Carolyn Hutchens (1999–2004)
- John Lewisohn (1999–2002)
- Darren Ray (1999–2008)
- Peter Logan (2002–2008)
- Judith Klepner (2004–2012)
- Janet Cribbes (2004–2008)
- Janet Bolitho (2004–2012)
- Karen Sait (2004–2008)
- Serge Thomann (2008–2016, 2024–current)
- Frank O'Connor (2008–2012)
- John Middleton (2008–2012)
- Jane Touzeau (2008–2016)
- Rachel Powning (2008–2012)
- Amanda Stevens (2012–2016)
- Vanessa Huxley (2012–2016)
- Anita Horvath (2012–2016)
- Cr. Andrew Bond (2012–2024)
- Bernadene Voss (2012–2020)
- Cr. Tim Baxter (2016–2024)
- Cr. Katherine Copsey (2016–2022)
- Cr. Louise Crawford (2016–current)
- Ogy Simic (2016–2020)
- Cr. Marcus Pearl (2016–2024)
- Cr. Heather Cunsolo (2020–current)
- Cr. Peter Martin (2020–2024)
- Cr. Rhonda Clark (2020–2024)
- Cr. Christina Sirakoff (2020–2024)
- Cr. Robbie Nyaguy (2023–2024)
- Cr. Alex Makin (2024–current)
- Cr. Beti Jay (2024–current)
- Cr. Bryan Mears (2024–current)
- Cr. Justin Halliday (2024–current)
- Cr. Libby Buckingham (2024–current)
- Cr. Rod Hardy (2024–current)

=== Mayors ===
- List of mayors of Port Phillip

+ deceased

== Sister cities and friendship links ==
- Ōbu, Aichi, Japan. (since 1993)
- (Timor-Leste) Suai, Cova Lima, East Timor. (friendship link since 2000)

== See also ==
- List of localities in Victoria for other Melbourne suburbs and municipalities.
