= Louise Crawford =

Australian actor and politician

- Born: 1978 (age 47–48); Queensland, Australia
- Occupations: Actress, councillor
- Website: https://www.louisecrawford.com.au/

Louise Crawford (born 1978) is an Australian film and television actress, who is a councillor and former mayor of the City of Port Phillip. Crawford has appeared in many Australian soaps and dramas, including a role as Sgt. Karen Hatzic in primetime drama series City Homicide.

== Political career ==
Crawford is a member of the Victorian branch of the Australian Labor Party.

Crawford is an activist for climate change action and trained with Al Gore in The Climate Reality Project. She was the unsuccessful Labor candidate for the seat of Brighton for the 2014 Victorian state election. In 2016, Crawford was elected as a Councillor of the City of Port Phillip, Canal Ward. On 29 Nov 2018 Cr Crawford was elected Deputy Mayor of that council. She also ran for the Australian Senate in the 2019 Australian federal election but was unsuccessful.

Crawford was re-elected as a Councillor for Port Phillip in October 2020, and served as Mayor from 2020 to 2021. Under her leadership the Council faced significant challenges resulting from the COVID-19 pandemic.

== Acting and writing career ==
Crawford first came to notice as Shelley Radcliffe in the 1995 Network Ten soap opera Echo Point. In 1996, she temporarily stood in for actress Tempany Deckert in the role of Selina Roberts on Home and Away, while Deckert recovered from illness. In 1998–99, Crawford appeared in Breakers, a short-lived soap opera series which aired on Network Ten, as Lucy Hill. She also appeared on Neighbours as Abby Stafford in 2007 and as Detective Ellen Crabb in 2013, reprising the role again in 2016.

She also appeared in Forget The Rules, a cross-platform 'dramedy' series which appeared on Foxtel's Channel V, but could also be watched on the Internet and on mobile phones. and hosted the reality series Scream Test. Additionally, she appeared as a regular panellist on Beauty and the Beast, and has dabbled as a scriptwriter, writing episodes of Breakers and Home and Away.

== Filmography ==
=== Film ===
Year	Title	Role	Notes
2002	The Hard Word	Waitress	Feature film
2004	The Mystery of Natalie Wood	Waitress	TV movie
2004	Love in the First Degree	Box Office Manager	
2008	The Tumbler	Jen	
2011	Sidekick	Connie	Short film
2012	John Doe	Leah	
2012	Who Wants to be a Terrorist!	Reporter at Bomb Site	

=== Television ===
Year	Title	Role	Notes
1994	Time Trax	Judy	TV series, 1 episode
1995	Echo Point	Shelley Radcliffe	TV series (regular role)
1996	Beauty and the Beast	Regular panellist	TV series
1996	Home and Away	Selina Roberts	TV series (temporary replacement for Tempany Deckert)
1998	Breakers	Lucy Hill	TV series (regular role)
2000	All Saints	Lynette Newman	TV series
2001	Scream Test	Host	TV series
2001–02	BeastMaster	Lycia	TV series
2003	Farscape	Second Prisoner	TV series, 1 episode
2005	Last Man Standing	Spunky Girl	TV series, 1 episode
2005	Forget The Rules	Lisa Jones	TV series (regular role)
2007	Neighbours	Abby Stafford	TV series, 8 episodes
2007–10	City Homicide	Sgt. Karen Hatzic	TV series, 29 episodes
2010	Offspring	Tammy	TV series, 1 episode
2011	Rush	Susie	TV series, 1 episode
2011	Killing Time	Sally Fraser	TV series, 5 episodes
2013, 2016–17	Neighbours	Ellen Crabb	TV series, recurring role
2014	Upper Middle Bogan	Hostess	TV series, 1 episode
2015	Utopia	Simone	TV series, 1 episode
2016-2017	Nowhere Boys	Katrina	TV series, 4 episodes
2021	Superwog	Soft Nurse	TV series, 1 episode
2026	Dear Life	Claire	TV series 1 episode (1.6)

== Writer ==
Year	Title	Notes
1998	Breakers	
1996	Home and Away	

Civic offices
Preceded by Bernadene Voss	Mayor of Port Phillip; 2020–2021	Succeeded by Marcus Pearl
