= Forget the Rules =

Forget the Rules was an Australian short form episodic comedy-drama, which ran for two seasons from 2005 to 2007. It was the first scripted drama in the world to simultaneously broadcast over broadband, mobile phones and television. It employed the push model of crossmedia, and was one of the more successful models of an often failed interactive format that included audience input into the script and submitting visual elements as part of a tight weekly production cycle. It was conceived and piloted in Australia during 2004. In Canada, Season 1 has been broadcast on Movieola.

== Seasons ==
- Season 1 - Oct 2005 to Jan 2006 - 39 episodes (3 per week) - 3 minutes each
- Season 2 - Nov 2007 to Dec 2007 - 30 episodes (5 per week) - 3 minutes each

Season 1 of Forget the Rules ran on Channel V (Foxtel), Hutchison 3G mobile phones and on the web, and consisted of nine minutes of drama produced every week featuring audience-driven story directions. Three-minute episodes were broadcast on Monday, Tuesday & Wednesday, starting 10 October 2005. Audiences voted on a choice of three possible story directions following the Wednesday episode. The 117 minutes of production (39 x 3min episodes) represents the equivalent of 5 x 30min episodes on free-to-air TV.

Season 2 ran weekdays from 12 November 2007 to 21 December 2007. The series was distributed across Optus Television (Ovation Channel weekdays, The Music Factory weeknights) and Optus Zoo (mobile), as well as online through the show's website, YouTube, Facebook, and MySpace.

== Characters ==
- Main characters
  - Philippe "Pepe" Fernandez (Steven Cabral)
  - Pony (Daniel Kitchener)
  - Lisa Jones (Louise Crawford)
- Supporting characters (multiple episodes) Season 1
  - Carmen, Pepe's sister
  - Tori, a girlfriend Pepe lent a CD to
  - Russ, a Jehovah's Witness who Lisa uses to win a bet
  - Rosie, Lisa and Pepe's roommate before Abby
  - Andrew, the guy Rosie falls for
  - Abby, Lisa and Pepe's roommate before Pony
- Supporting characters (multiple episodes) Season 2
  - Alex, Pony's best sex ever
  - Merline, Pepe's bunny-and-muffin stalker
  - Dr Knight, Lisa's doctor who makes house calls
  - Serena, Lisa's ad producer who casts Pepe
  - Cherie, an employee Pony meets at a sperm bank
  - The Joneses, Lisa's parents

== Production ==
The Season 1 scripts were written on Thursday based on the most popular audience vote. Pre-production and rehearsal on Friday. All nine minutes of the show was shot on Saturday and was broadcast each Monday-Wednesday throughout the 13-week season. Because of the requirement for rapid turnaround, stories were designed to be topical and responsive to genuine audience input, and was limited to an M rating. Forget the Rules was designed to appeal to story literate young audiences through interactivity. Jim Shomos, the creator and executive producer, was cited as saying young audiences need "more story per minute" and emphasised the importance of fast-paced stories with rapid developments, particularly for short form content:

We didn’t think when we were starting this out that it was going to be the first – we didn’t even think it was going to be on TV, we weren’t even sure about mobile, but that’s the way it’s all come out."

He often talked about the complexity of putting the deals together, attracting investment and coming up with the right business models Shomos devised the series format and produced FTR with his partners Paul Baiguerra and Peter Dixon from Catfish Films.
