= Edward Heather =

Australian cricketer and administrator (1848–1935)

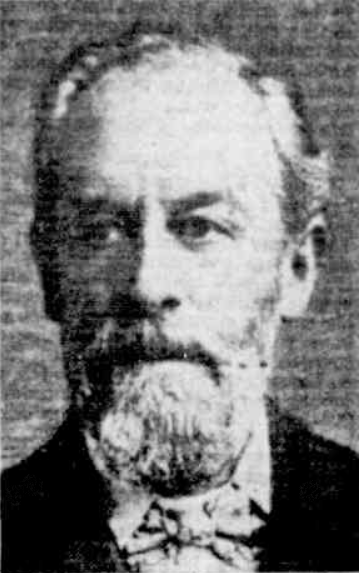

Personal information
- Full name: Edward Drinkall Heather
- Born: 6 October 1848; Marylebone, London, England
- Died: 10 July 1935 (aged 86); Melbourne, Australia
- Relatives: Percy Heather (son)

Domestic team information
- Years: Team
- 1871: Victoria
- Source: Cricinfo, 3 May 2015

Edward Drinkall Heather (6 October 1848 – 10 July 1935) was an Australian cricketer and administrator. He played one first-class cricket match for Victoria in 1871.

Heather was the honorary secretary of the Victorian Cricket Association for 30 years. He was a councillor for the City of South Melbourne for 18 years and served as mayor in 1888-89. He worked as secretary and librarian of the Emerald Hill Mechanics Institute, and then, when the Institute library became the South Melbourne library, as librarian for the City of South Melbourne, a combined service of 38 years from 1881 to 1919.

Heather's wife, three daughters and two sons survived him. His son Percy played first-class cricket in South Africa and Australia.
