= City of South Melbourne =

- Local government area
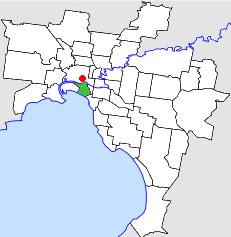
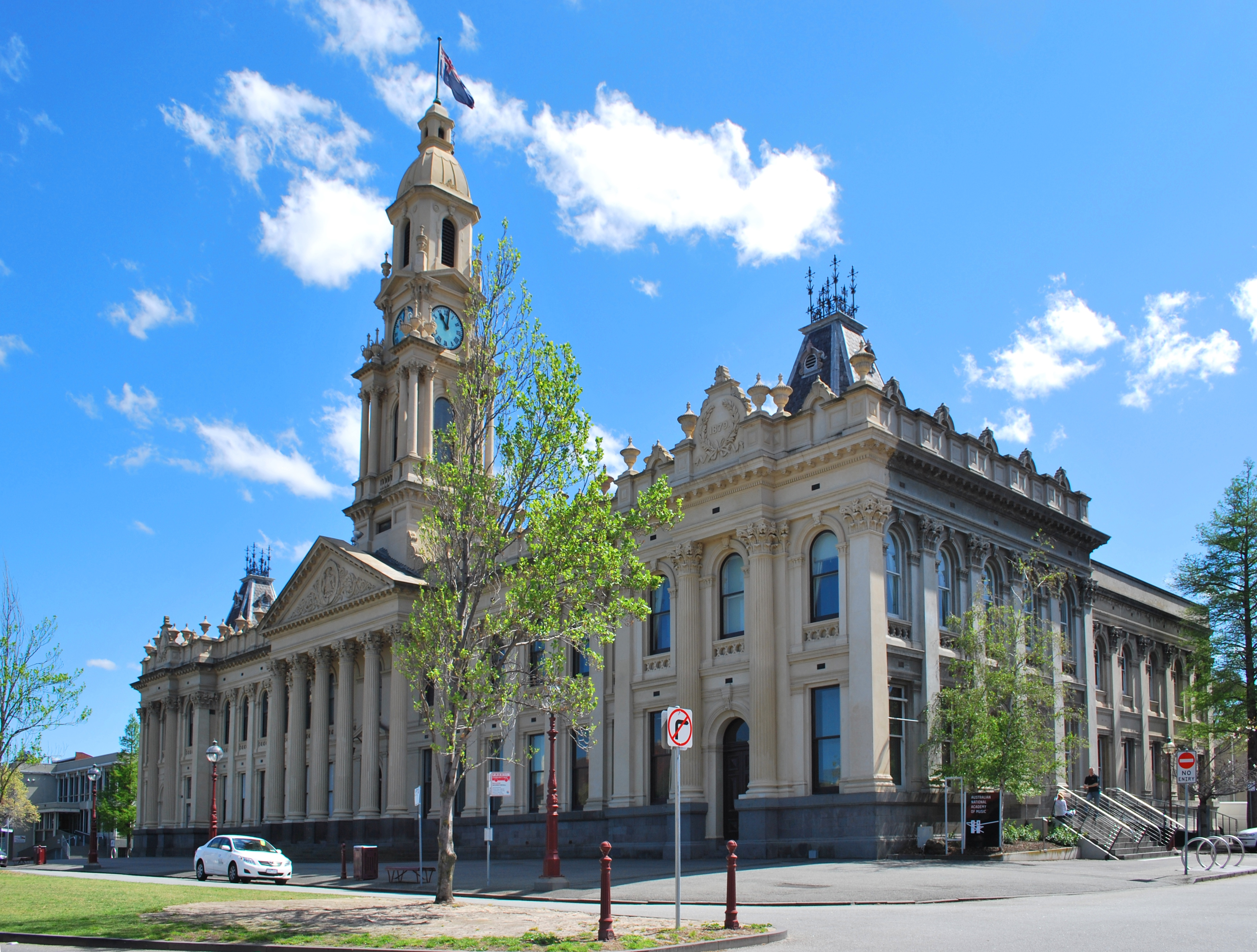
- Location in Melbourne South Melbourne Town Hall

- The extent of the City of South Melbourne until 1993
- Coordinates: 37°59′06″S 144°57′36″E
- Country: Australia
- State: Victoria
- Region: Inner Melbourne
- Established: 1855
- Abolished: 1994
- Council seat: South Melbourne

Area
  - Total: 8.91 km^{2} (3.44 sq mi)

Population
  - Total: 17,600 (1992)
  - Density: 1,975/km^{2} (5,116/sq mi)
- County: Bourke
LGAs around City of South Melbourne
Melbourne	Melbourne	Melbourne
Port Melbourne	City of South Melbourne	Prahran
Port Phillip	Port Phillip	St Kilda

The City of South Melbourne was a local government area about 2 kilometres (1.2 mi) south of Melbourne, the state capital of Victoria, Australia, on the south bank of the Yarra River. The city covered an area of 8.91 square kilometres (3.44 sq mi), and existed from 1855 until 1994.

The council area was bounded by the Yarra River to the north, Fraser and Lorne Streets to the south, the Port Phillip foreshore and Pickles Street to the west, and St Kilda Road to the east.

== History ==
South Melbourne was first incorporated as the Emerald Hill Borough on 26 May 1855, and became a town on 1 March 1872. It was proclaimed a city, and was renamed South Melbourne, on 21 September 1883.

On 18 November 1993, the northern strip of the City, including Southbank, the Victorian Arts Centre, and the part of Docklands south of the Yarra, was annexed to the City of Melbourne.

On 22 June 1994, the City of South Melbourne was abolished, and along with the Cities of Port Melbourne and St Kilda, was merged into the newly created City of Port Phillip.

The council met at the South Melbourne Town Hall on Bank Street, between Fishley and Layfield Streets, South Melbourne. The hall still exists and is now used by the Australian National Academy of Music.

== Suburbs ==
- Albert Park
- Melbourne (between Queens Road and St Kilda Road)
- Middle Park
- Southbank
- South Melbourne*

* Council seat.

== Population ==
Year	Population
1861	8,822
1881	25,374
1891	41,724
1921	46,873
1954	37,955
1958	35,300*
1961	32,528
1966	30,174
1971	26,995
1976	21,334
1981	19,955
1986	18,499
1991	17,712

* Estimate in the 1958 Victorian Year Book.

== Councillors ==
The City of South Melbourne was divided into four wards, each electing three councillors:

- Canterbury Ward
- Fawkner Ward
- Hobson Ward
- Queens Ward

=== List of known councillors ===
Councillor	Party	Ward	Term start	Term end
Edward Heather	Independent	Queen's	18??	18??
Thomas Smith	Political Labour League	Beaconsfield	1885	1895
Thomas Smith	Labor	Beaconsfield	1895	1901
Thomas Ashworth	Free Trade Association		1895	1898
James Laurence Murphy	Labor		1904	1942
Arthur Disney	Labor		1908	1918
Charles Merrett	Liberal		1915	1917
Charles Merrett	Nationalist		1917	1922
Charles Merrett	Liberal Union		1922	1925
Charles Merrett	Independent Liberal		1922	1925
Charles Merrett	Australian Liberal		1926	1932
Charles Merrett	Independent Liberal		1932	1937
Robert Williams	Labor		1921	1932
Robert Williams	Independent		1932	1932
Arthur Wallace	Labor		1928	1932
Arthur Wallace	Independent		1932	1937
Archibald Crofts	Non-Labor	Queen's	1931	1933
Archibald Crofts	United Australia	Queen's	1933	1942†
Keith Sutton	Labor		1939	1952
Doris Condon AM	Labor		1962	1974
Reg Macey	Liberal		1973	1981
Reg Macey	Liberal		1982	1985

† = Died in office

== Gallery ==
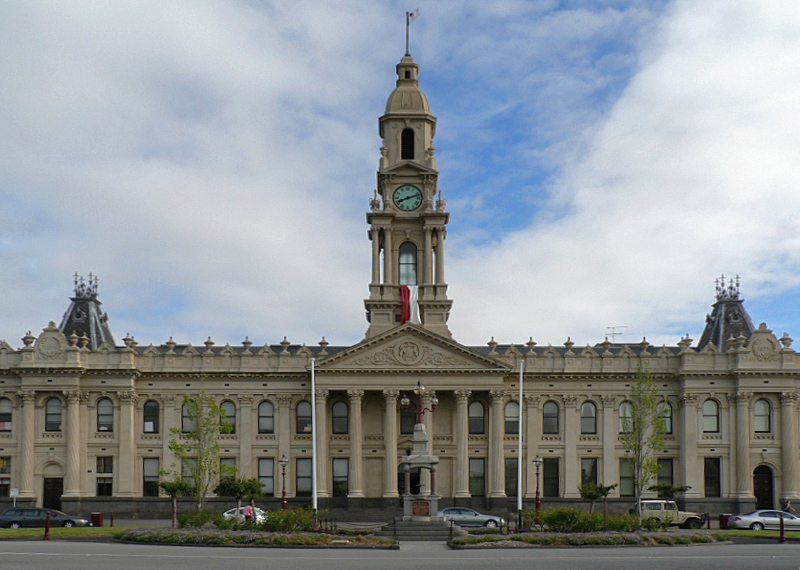
South Melbourne Town Hall
