= St Kilda Town Hall =

Town hall in Victoria, Australia

Coordinates: 37.868616°S 144.988192°E

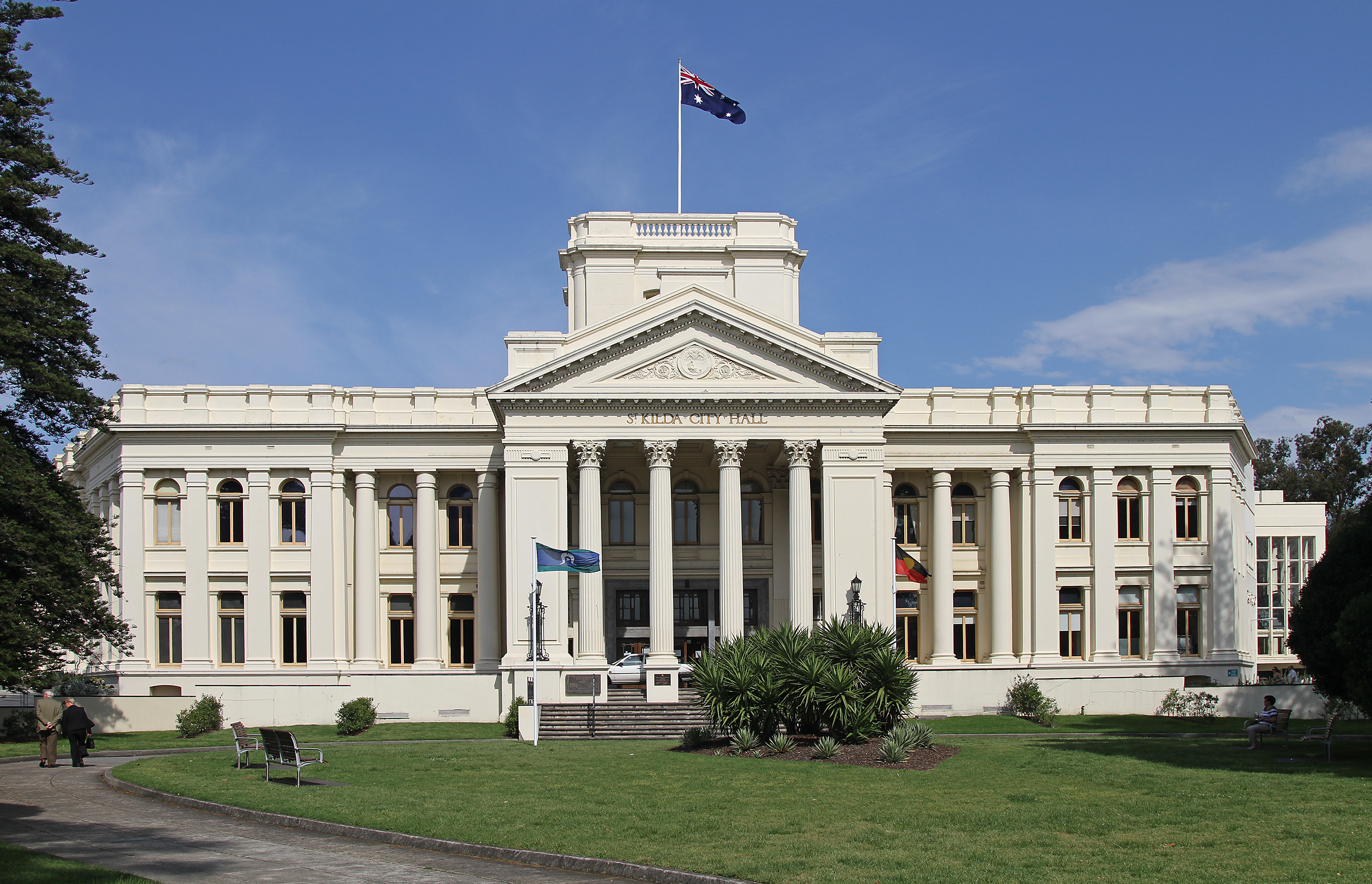
St Kilda Town Hall main facade facing Brighton Road

St Kilda Town Hall is a grand, classically styled city hall, located on the corner of Brighton Road and Carlisle Street in St Kilda, Victoria, Australia. The first stage, never completed, was built as the municipal offices and public hall for the former City of St Kilda in 1890. Many additions, internal alterations, and changes in appearance were made in the early and mid 20th century, while serving as the municipal and social heart of St Kilda. A devastating fire in 1991 seriously affected the art collection and burnt out the hall itself, and was followed by a prize winning refurbishment and further extension. After Council amalgamations in 1994, it became the base for the larger City of Port Phillip, and further extensions and renovations have occurred. The hall within remains popular for numerous social events, meetings and performances, a role it has served for over 120 years.

== History ==
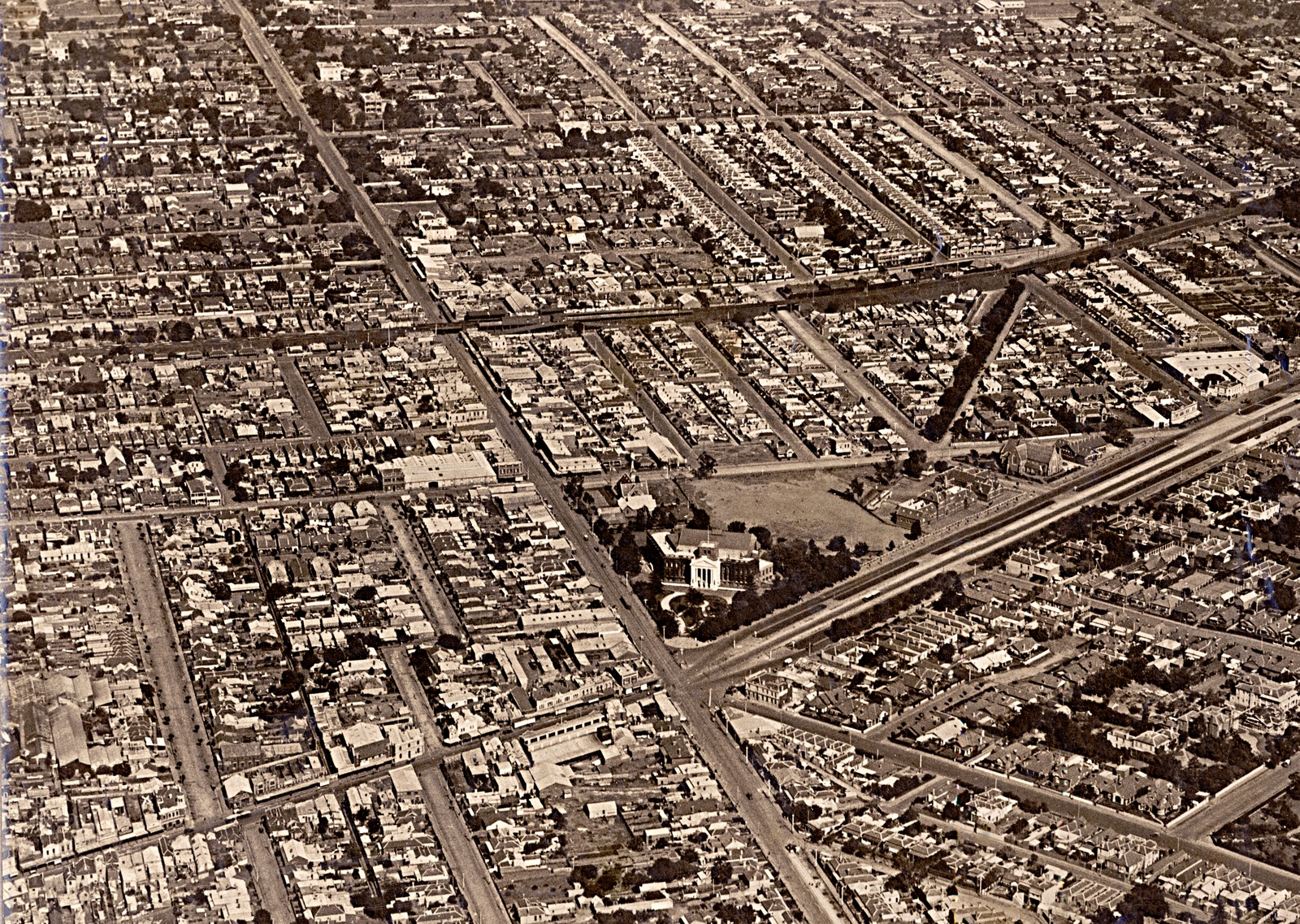
Aerial view of the area around the St Kilda Town Hall, c. 1920

The St Kilda town hall was commissioned to replace an earlier 1859 building on the corner of Grey and Barkly Streets. This site was reserved in 1883, selected in 1887, and an elaborate towered design by architect William Pitt in an ornate Second Empire style won a limited competition in 1888. The building opened in 1890, but in incomplete form, with only the hall, the front wing and Carlisle Street wings built, the brick walls left unrendered and undecorated, and the portico and tower not built. In 1892, instead of completing the building, a large pipe organ by noted firm George Fincham was installed in the hall. The 1890s depression which started that same year prevented any further work for many years.

In 1925 the large classical portico, similar to but not the same as Pitt's design, was built, along with the current elaborate internal stair-hall. Though generally known as the Town Hall, the portico proclaims the building as a City Hall. The building's other brick walls stayed bare until 1957 when they were finally stuccoed over and painted white, in a simplified classical form without any elaboration, not even the column capitals. In 1939 a new Art Deco style Council Chamber was included as part of an addition on the Brighton Road side, while in 1971 a modernist addition was made to the Carlisle Street side.

In the early hours of Sunday 7 April 1991, fire gutted the hall itself, and resulting in loss of the internal decoration, the organ, and destruction or severe damage to the many works of art that lined the halls. Some 30 fire trucks & 100 firefighters were required to assist. Arson was suspected.

The office portion of the building was soon repaired, and firm of ARM Architecture tasked with the restoration of the hall and building a new entry on the Carlisle Street side, and offices to the rear, completed in 1994. The hall was not fully restored, but instead a new ceiling was created, the hall divided in two, some of the plasterwork restored, and some left in its damaged state. This work won two Royal Australian Institute of Architects awards in 1995. A further expansion took place in the 2000s on the Carlisle Street side completed in February 2008, incorporating the dividing glass wall removed from the hall, opening it up again.

The Town Hall sits in an unusually spacious setting, with sweeping lawns and a circular driveway leading to the grand front staircase and portico.

== A social centre ==
Along with the usual municipal balls, receptions, and functions, the hall has hosted many events over its long history. In the 1930s, unemployed people picked up their sugar bags of donated food during the Great Depression; a thousand women in hats, gloves, pearls and floral frocks joined the Queen Mother for morning tea in 1958; and the last of former prime minister Gough Whitlam's "It's Time" rallies was held there in 1972.

It was a major ballroom dancing venue throughout the mid and latter part of the twentieth century, when Ballroom dancing was a popular pastime, curtailed when the hall was divided in two as part of the 1994 works (since reversed).

For the 1956 Summer Olympics, the building hosted the fencing events.

The main hall, other rooms, and even the Council Chamber can be booked for events, making the building well used.

In 2015, the hall was the venue for the popular St Kilda Short Film Festival.

== See also ==
- List of town halls in Melbourne
- City of Port Phillip
- List of mayors of Yarra
