= Dick Gross =

Australian politician (born 1954)

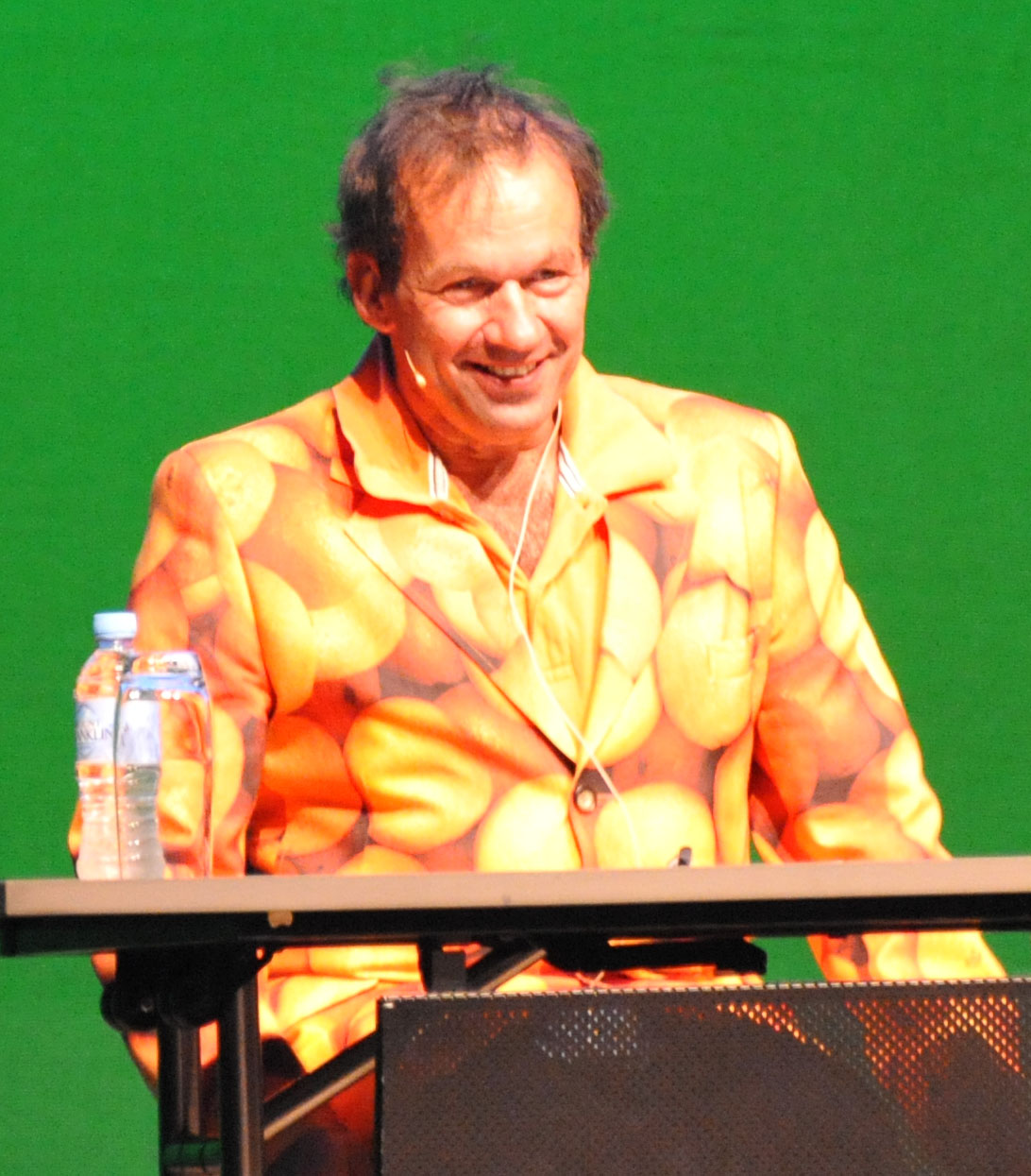
- Gross at the 2012 Global Atheist Convention

3rd Mayor of Port Phillip
- In office 1998–2000
- Preceded by: Christine Häag
- Succeeded by: Julian Hill
- In office 2004–2004
- Preceded by: Liz Johnstone
- Succeeded by: Darren Ray
- In office 2018–2019
- Preceded by: Bernadene Voss
- Succeeded by: Bernadene Voss

Personal details
- Born: Richard Andrew Landa Gross; 16 November 1954 (age 71)
- Party: Independent; Australian Labor Party (until 2024)

Richard Andrew Landa Gross AM (born 16 November 1954 in Melbourne, Australia) is an Australian politician. He was a long-serving councillor of the City of Port Phillip and its Mayor from November 2018 till late 2019, having previously served from 1998 to 2000 and in 2004. He was not re-elected to council in the 2020 election.

He has also served as the President of the Municipal Association of Victoria. He is known for his enthusiastic style in highlighting important social and legal issues in the community.

During this time he supported a proposal for Sex Tolerance Zones in St Kilda where street prostitutes would not be arrested in about 25 locations, including one near St Kilda Park Primary School. However, after wide community protests, including a march on St Kilda Town Hall, Gross and then Albert Park District parliamentarian, John Thwaites MLA, backed down.

He backed the controversial failed redevelopment of the St Kilda Triangle site in 2008, which resulted in his defeat at that year's council elections after a fierce campaign.

Gross was defeated at two later elections the last being in Junction Ward.

On 26 January 2010, Gross was appointed as a Member of the Order of Australia, "for service to local government, particularly through the Municipal Association of Victoria, as a contributor to environmental reform initiatives in the area of waste management, and to the community of Port Phillip."

Gross was elected to council again in 2016, in Canal Ward. In February 2017, he proposed a successful motion requesting that the government change laws to allow pill testing of illegal drugs at entertainment venues in Port Phillip.

He was re-elected mayor for a fourth term on 28 November 2018. He is Port Phillip's longest serving Councillor and equal longest serving Mayor with four terms. Dick was not successful in his re-election bid in 2020.

In the lead-up to the 2024 council elections, Gross won the local plebiscite for endorsement from the Australian Labor Party for Alma Ward. However, an internal ALP selection committee overruled this result, endorsing runner-up Jill Horman instead. Gross is disputing the decision, expressing offense that the announcement was made before his dispute was heard, and stating, "I won the local plebiscite. The party overruled that election in an undemocratic manner."

== Literary works ==
Gross has written several fiction and non-fiction works, on topics ranging from atheism to merchant banks:

- Money for Jam, How to spread it and not make a mess (1990)
- Tricontinental: The Rise and Fall of a Merchant Bank with Hugo Armstrong (1995)
- A Godless Gospel (1999)
- Jesus, Judas and Mordy Ben Ruben: Three good Jewish boys in Jerusalem (2005)
