= South Melbourne Town Hall =

Civic building in Melbourne, Australia

Coordinates: 37.834132°S 144.959514°E

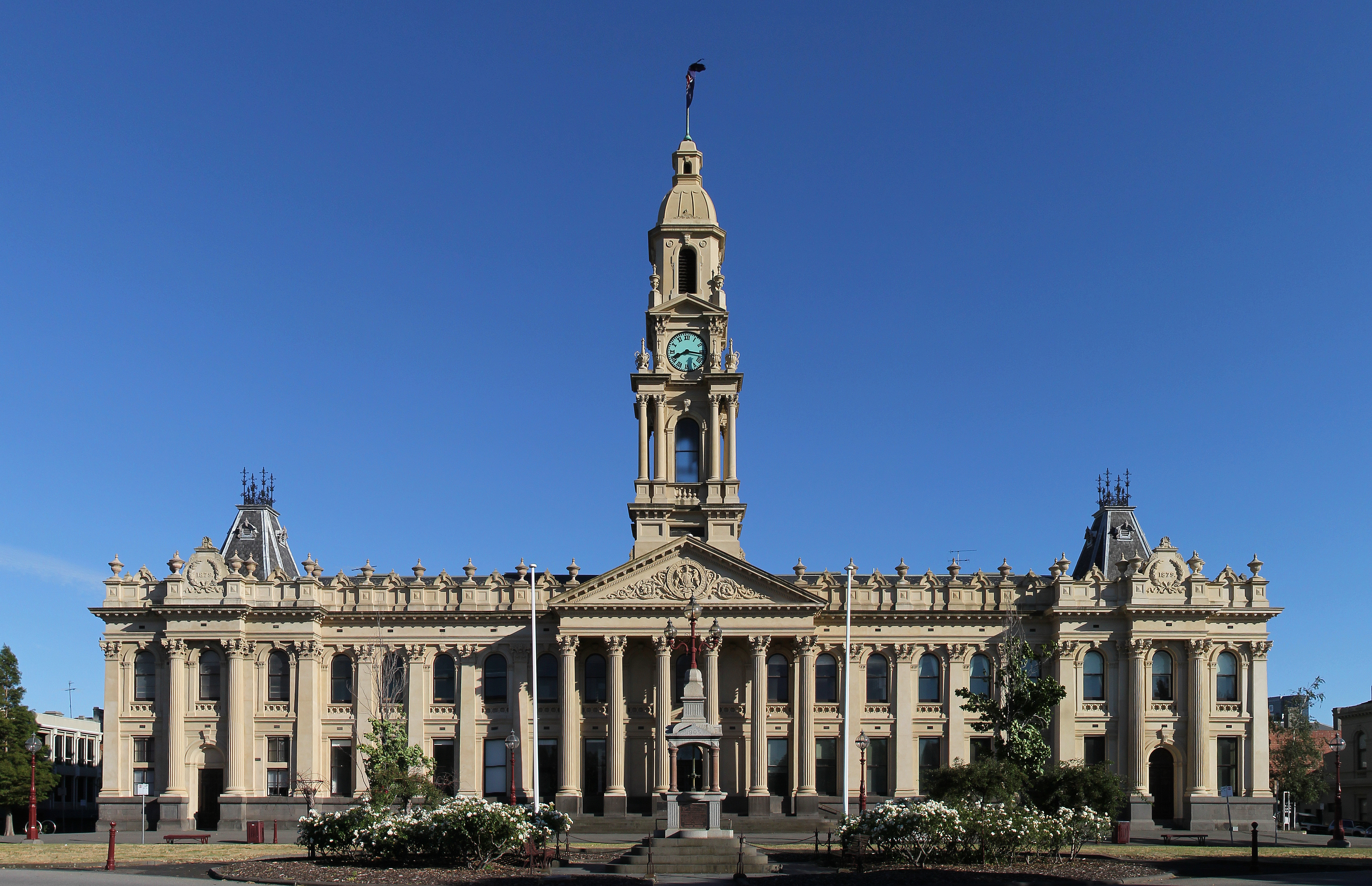
South Melbourne Town Hall.

South Melbourne Town Hall is a landmark civic building located on Bank Street in South Melbourne, a suburb of Melbourne, Victoria, Australia. It is listed on the Victorian Heritage Register as of state heritage significance to Victoria.

== History ==
The town hall was authorised by the Emerald Hill Town Hall Act 1876 (40 Vict. No. 547 (Vic)), and officially opened on 30 June 1880, and was built to house what was then known as the Emerald Hill Town Council, as well as a public hall, a mechanics' institute and library, the Post and Telegraph Department, the police, courthouse and fire brigade.

It was designed by noted Melbourne architect Charles Webb in Victorian Academic Classical style, featuring a wide facade of giant order Corinthian columns and pilasters, with a central portico and projecting pavilions at each corner, dominated by a very tall multi-stage clock tower. The town hall was built on an elevated site, the centrepiece of a formally planned block, with a forecourt in the form of a small curved park. The clock was added to the clock tower in 1881, and the name of the city was changed to South Melbourne in 1883.

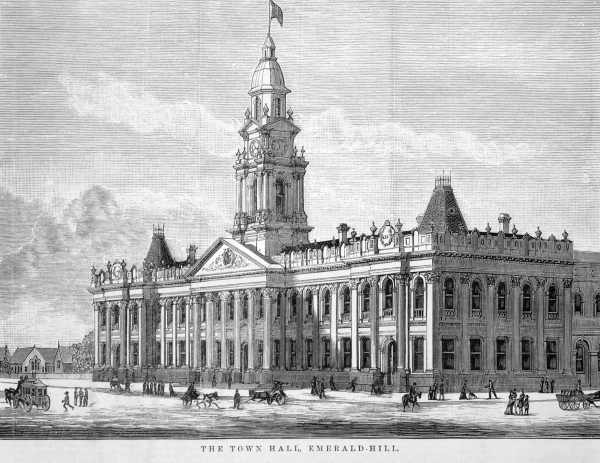
South Melbourne Town Hall in 1880

In the 1930s some interior elements were refurbished and new council chamber furniture was installed, designed by Oakley and Parkes.

The building is on the Victorian Heritage Register, along with the park and the 1905 Boer War memorial in front. It is considered one of Victoria's grandest town halls, symbolising the prosperity and confidence of South Melbourne last century.

In 1994, the cities of South Melbourne, Port Melbourne and St Kilda were amalgamated to form the new City of Port Phillip. The new council administration was centred at the St Kilda Town Hall, with only secondary offices retained at the South Melbourne Town Hall.

That same year, the Federal Government created the Australian National Academy of Music (ANAM), which became the main occupant of the building. ANAM is the national centre for the further development of musicians with outstanding talent in Australia, and the hall has become a concert venue.

The building was restored in 2004 thanks to a state government heritage grant, enabling the reinstatement of the decorative roof and iron cresting (removed in 1945), and restoration of the original ochre exterior colour.

In 2012 Multicultural Arts Victoria, Victoria's peak arts organisation promoting cultural diversity in the arts, moved their home to the South Melbourne Town Hall.

In 2018, a significant parts of the internal roof collapsed, and parts of the building were closed for many months whilst significant construction works were carried out. In 2020, the whole building was closed due to safety concerns, with repairs scheduled to take some years. ANAM relocated to the Abbotsford Convent pending completion of the repair works and a large scale refurbishment.

== Gallery ==
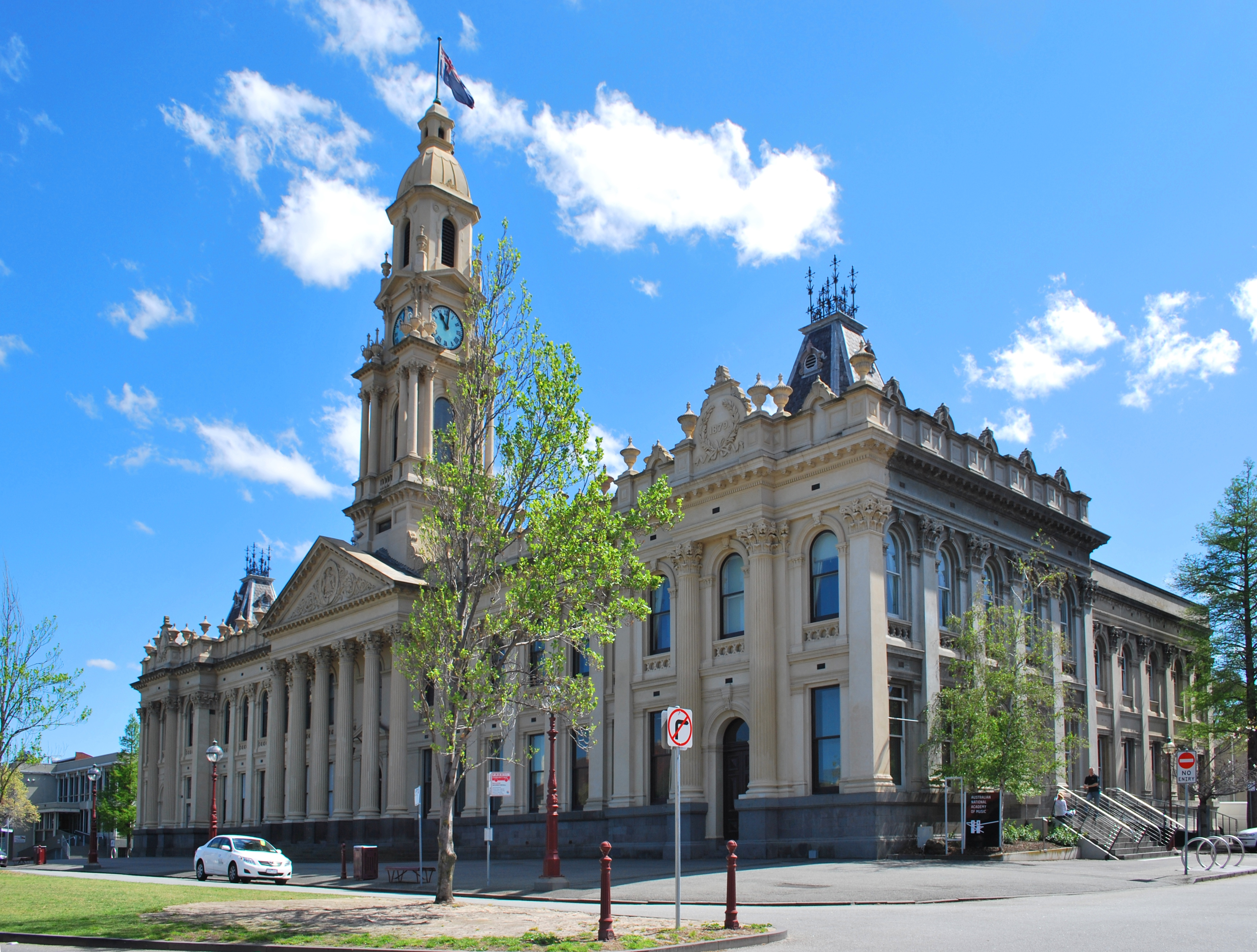
Contemporary view

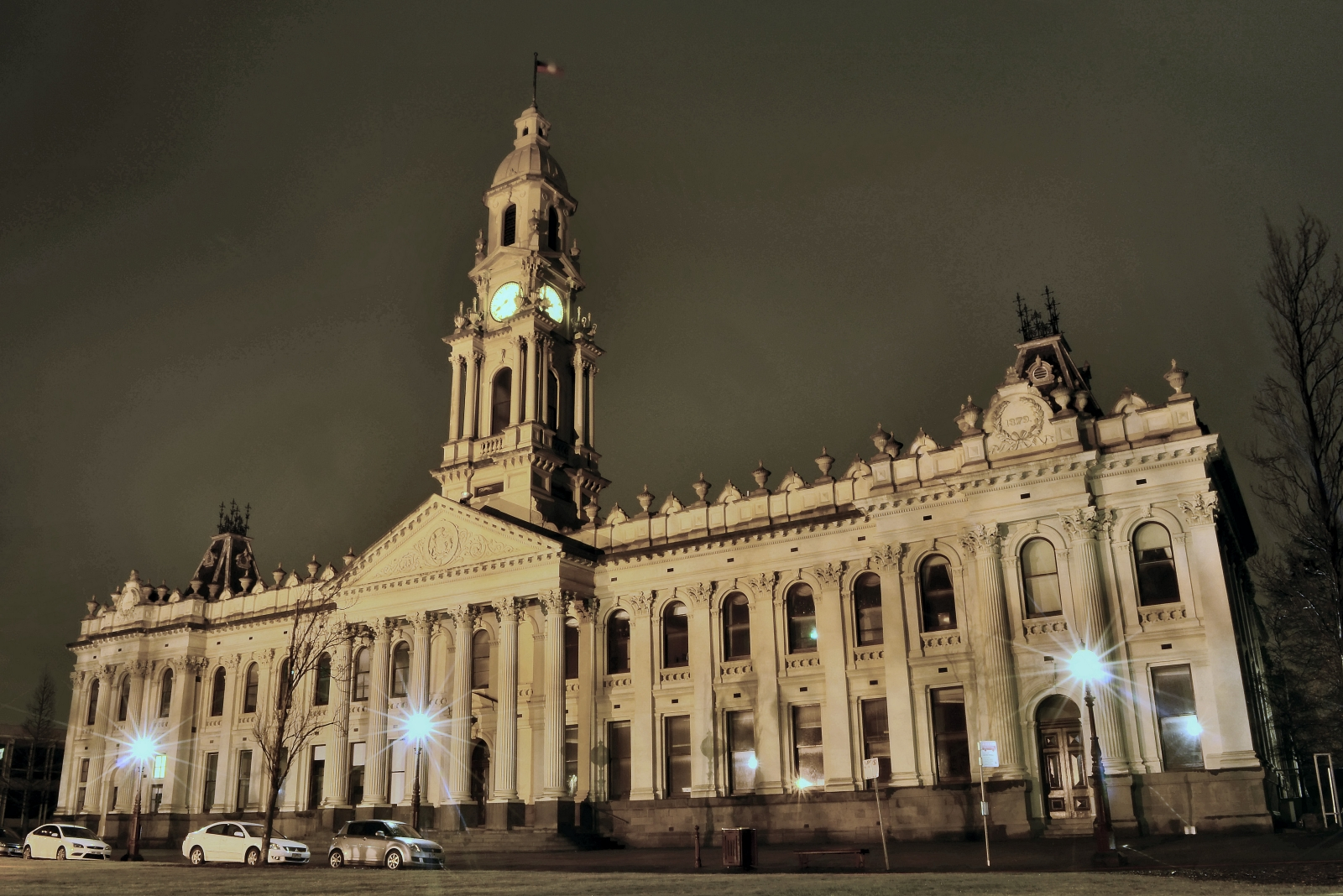
At night

== See also ==
- List of town halls in Melbourne
