= City of St Kilda =

Coordinates: 37°51′50″S 144°58′55″E

- Local government area
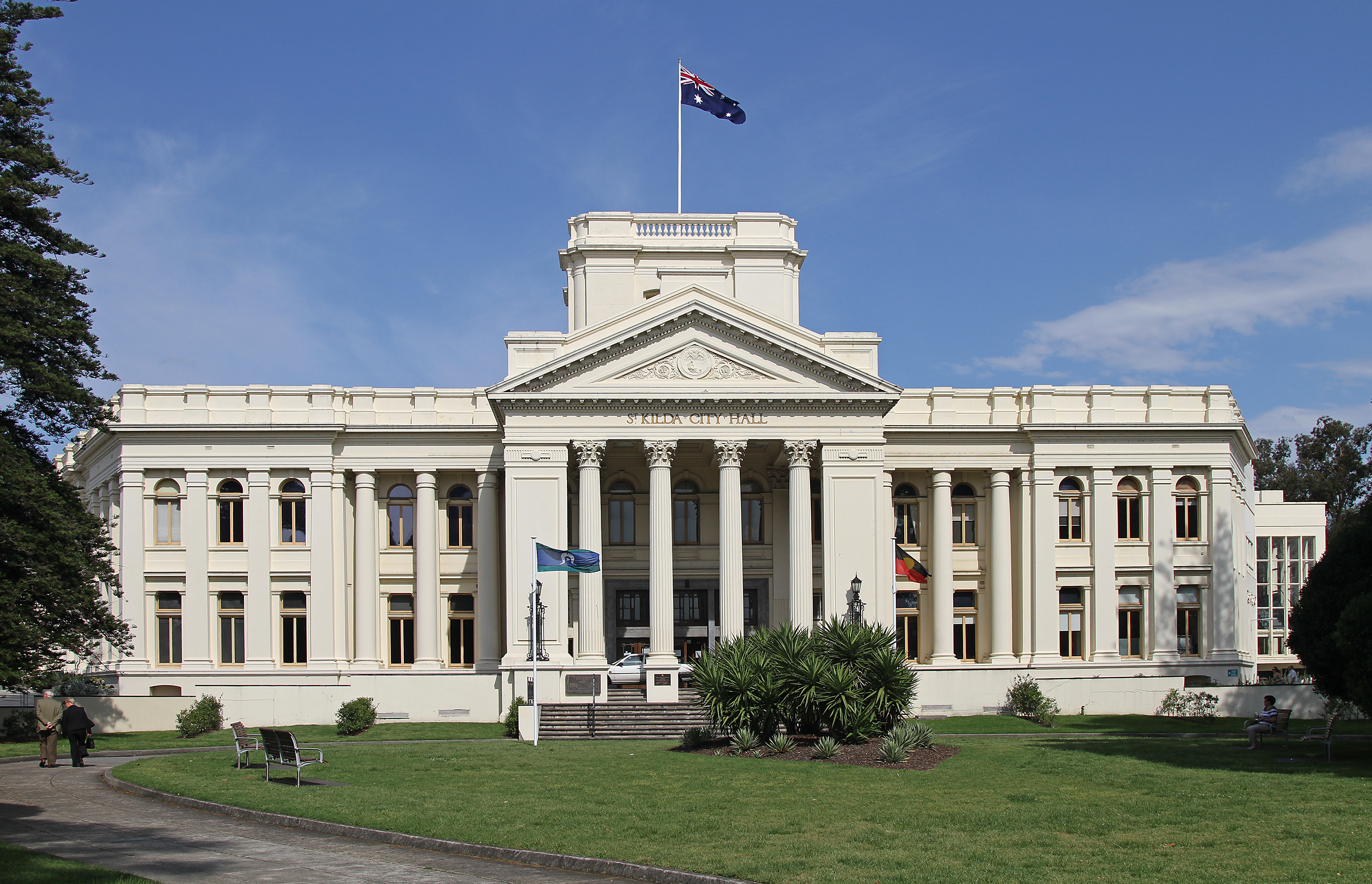
- St Kilda Town Hall, on the corner of Carlisle Street and St Kilda Road

- The City of St Kilda as at its dissolution in 1994
- Country: Australia
- State: Victoria
- Region: Inner Melbourne
- Established: 1855
- Council seat: St Kilda

Area
  - Total: 8.70 km^{2} (3.36 sq mi)

Population
  - Total: 45,889 (1992)
  - Density: 5,274.6/km^{2} (13,661/sq mi)
- County: Bourke
LGAs around City of St Kilda
| South Melbourne | Melbourne | Prahran |
| Port Phillip | City of St Kilda | Caulfield |
| Port Phillip | Brighton | Caulfield |

The City of St Kilda was a local government area on Port Phillip, about 5 kilometres (3.1 mi) south of Melbourne, the state capital of Victoria, Australia. The city covered an area of 8.70 square kilometres (3.36 sq mi), and existed from 1855 until 1994.

== History ==
The locality known as St Kilda was first surveyed and land sales took place in 1842, comprising the blocks between the esplanade and Grey Street and Fitzroy Street, when the area was part of the City of Melbourne.

A municipal district called St Kilda was created on 24 April 1855, but this was only the area to the east of Barkly Street.

In 1855 following petitions for the inhabitants of the village of St Kilda, this was expanded to include the area to the west, which became the Municipality of St Kilda, and a Council was elected in 9th March 1857.

Council meetings were first held at the St Kilda Police Station, at St Kilda Junction, before the city's first town hall was built in 1859, on the corner of Grey and Barkly Streets.

It was proclaimed a City on 8 September 1890.

A new town hall was built for the city, on the corner of Carlisle Street and Brighton Road. The site was reserved in 1883, selected in 1887, with plans drawn up by architect William Pitt in 1888, the uncompleted building opening in 1890.

On 22 June 1994, the City of St Kilda was abolished, and along with the Cities of Port Melbourne and South Melbourne, was merged into the newly created City of Port Phillip.

The council met at the St Kilda Town Hall, at the intersection of St Kilda Road and Carlisle Street, St Kilda. The facility is now the main council chambers for the City of Port Phillip.

== Wards ==
The City of St Kilda was divided into four wards on 5 April 1987, each electing three councillors:

- North Ward
- West Ward
- Centre Ward
- South Ward

== Suburbs ==
The council area was bounded by Fraser and Lorne Streets, Punt Road and Wellington Street/Dandenong Road to the north; Orrong Road, Inkerman Street and Hotham Street to the east, Glen Huntly Road, St Kilda Street and Head Street to the south, and Port Phillip to the west.

Suburbs within the City of St Kilda were:

- Balaclava
- Elwood
- Ripponlea
- St Kilda*
- St Kilda East (shared with the City of Caulfield)

* Council seat.

== Population ==
| Year | Population |
|---|---|
| 1861 | 6,408 |
| 1901 | 20,542 |
| 1921 | 38,579 |
| 1947 | 58,318 |
| 1954 | 53,301 |
| 1958 | 51,200* |
| 1961 | 52,205 |
| 1966 | 58,179 |
| 1971 | 61,203 |
| 1976 | 51,254 |
| 1981 | 49,366 |
| 1986 | 45,889 |
| 1991 | 45,481 |

* Estimate in the 1958 Victorian Year Book.

== Gallery ==
The first town hall, at the corner of Grey and Barkly Streets
