= City of Port Melbourne =

Coordinates: 37°49′26″S 144°54′40″E

- Local government area
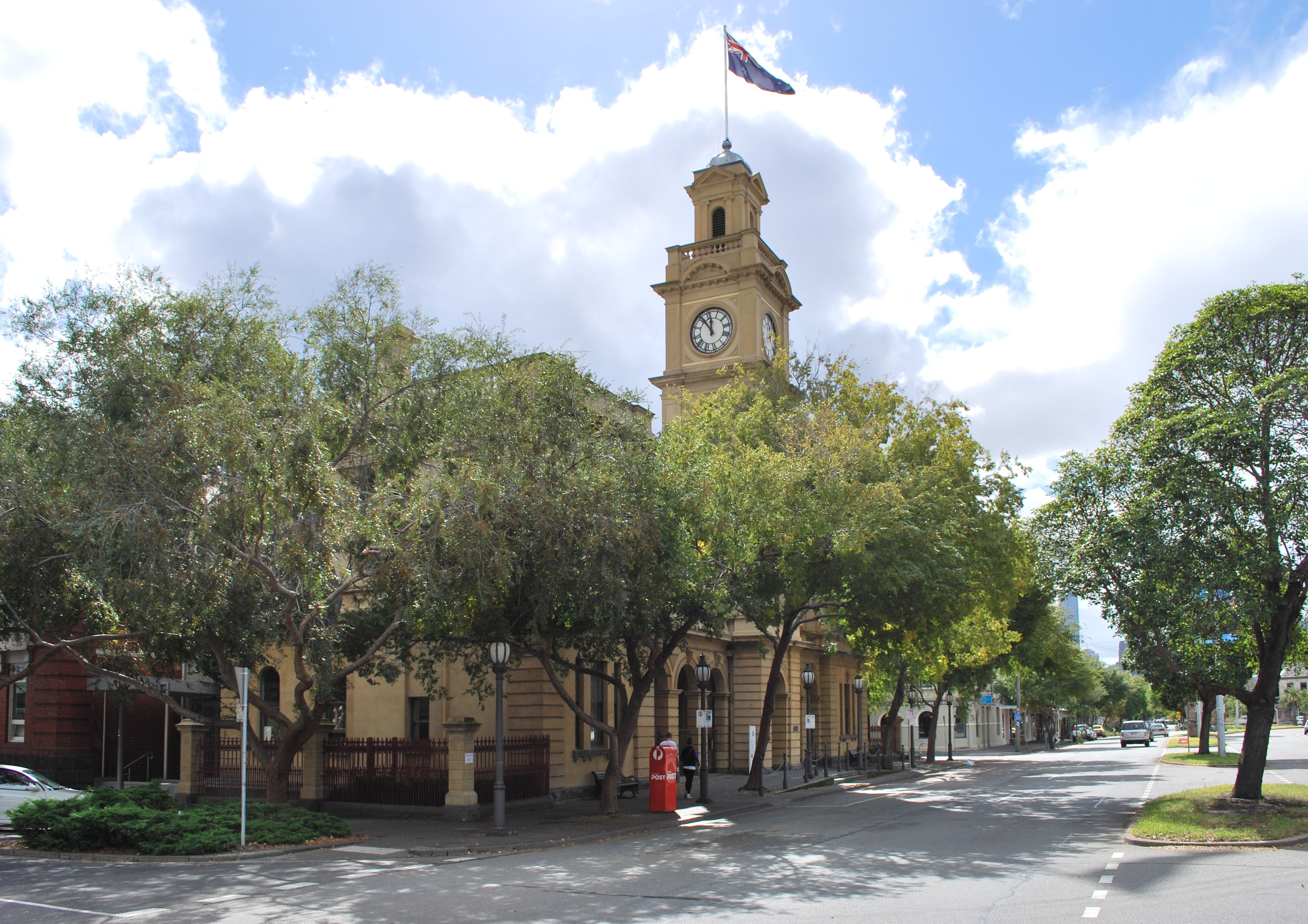
- The former Port Melbourne Town Hall

- The extent of the City of Port Melbourne until 1993
- Country: Australia
- State: Victoria
- Region: Inner Melbourne
- Established: 1860
- Council seat: Port Melbourne

Area
  - Total: 10.62 km^{2} (4.10 sq mi)

Population
  - Total(s): 7,900 (1992)
  - Density: 744/km^{2} (1,927/sq mi)
- County: Bourke
LGAs around City of Port Melbourne
Footscray	Melbourne	Melbourne
Williamstown	City of Port Melbourne	South Melbourne
Williamstown	Port Phillip	Port Phillip

The City of Port Melbourne was a local government area about 4 kilometres (2 mi) southwest of Melbourne, the state capital of Victoria, Australia, on the south bank of the Yarra River. The city covered an area of 10.62 square kilometres (4.10 sq mi), and existed from 1860 until 1994.

The council area covered the current boundaries of the suburb of Port Melbourne; the Yarra River to the west and north, Boundary Street to the northeast, Hobsons Bay to the south and Pickles Street to the east.

== History ==
Port Melbourne was first incorporated as the Sandridge Borough on 13 July 1860. It was renamed Port Melbourne on 25 January 1884, and became a town on 20 January 1893. It was proclaimed a city on 14 May 1919.

The Labor Party normally dominated the council. In 1992, Lyn Allison was elected to the council as an Independent, a position she held until 1994. Allison was later elected as a member of the Australian Senate, and she also served as Leader of the Australian Democrats.

The council met at the Port Melbourne Town Hall, at Bay Street and Spring Street, Port Melbourne. The facility is now used as a municipal library by the City of Port Phillip.

In October 1993, the City of Melbourne Act 1993 came into effect, transferring more than half of the City's area to the City of Melbourne, including Coode Island, Fishermans Bend and Webb Dock. Only the residential areas and the Port Melbourne Industrial Estate (south of the West Gate Freeway) remained.

On 22 June 1994, the City of Port Melbourne was abolished, and along with the City of South Melbourne (which had also been reduced in size by the City of Melbourne Act) and the City of St Kilda, was merged into the newly created City of Port Phillip. At the time of its dissolution, the City of Port Melbourne had by far the fewest residents of any municipality in greater Melbourne. The second least populous, the City of Collingwood, had almost twice the population. Port Melbourne also had the highest ratio of employees to residents of any suburban council, with 21.2 full-time equivalent staff for every 1000 residents in 1992.

== Wards ==
The City of Port Melbourne was divided into three wards, each electing three councillors:

- Boundary Ward
- Centre Ward
- Sandridge Ward

== Population ==
Year	Population
1954	13,104
1958	12,700*
1961	12,370
1966	12,596
1971	11,705
1976	9,356
1981	8,585
1986	8,080
1991	7,496

* Estimate in the 1958 Victorian Year Book.
