= Electoral results for the Division of Batman =

Australian division election results

This is a list of electoral results for the Division of Batman in Australian federal elections from the division's creation in 1906 until its abolition in 2019. The division was then renamed to the Division of Cooper.

== Members ==
Member	Party	Term
Jabez Coon	Protectionist	1906–1909
Jabez Coon	Liberal	1909–1910
Henry Beard	Labour	1910–1910
Frank Brennan	Labor	1911–1931
Samuel Dennis	United Australia	1931–1934
Frank Brennan	Labor	1934–1949
Alan Bird	Labor	1949–1962
Sam Benson	Labor	1962–1966
Sam Benson	Independent	1966–1969
Horrie Garrick	Labor	1969–1977
Brian Howe	Labor	1977–1996
Martin Ferguson	Labor	1996–2013
David Feeney	Labor	2013–2018
Ged Kearney	Labor	2018–2019

== Election results ==
=== Elections in the 2010s ===
==== 2018 by-election ====
2018 Batman by-election
Party	Candidate	Votes	%	±%
Labor	Ged Kearney	36,840	43.14	+7.87
Greens	Alex Bhathal	33,725	39.49	+3.26
Conservatives	Kevin Bailey	5,471	6.41	+6.41
Animal Justice	Miranda Smith	2,528	2.96	+1.29
Rise Up Australia	Yvonne Gentle	2,217	2.60	+2.60
Independent	Teresa van Lieshout	1,245	1.46	+1.46
Liberty Alliance	Debbie Robinson	1,186	1.39	+1.39
Sustainable Australia	Mark McDonald	951	1.11	+1.11
	Adrian Whitehead	745	0.87	+0.87
People's Party	Tegan Burns	496	0.58	+0.58
Total formal votes		85,404	93.79	+1.57
Informal votes		5,650	6.21	−1.57
Turnout		91,054	81.40	−8.28
Two-candidate-preferred result
Labor	Ged Kearney	46,446	54.38	+3.35
Greens	Alex Bhathal	38,958	45.62	−3.35
Labor hold		Swing	+3.35	

Alluvial diagram of the full preference distribution

==== 2016 ====
2016 Australian federal election: Batman
Party	Candidate	Votes	%	±%
Greens	Alex Bhathal	32,645	36.23	+9.83
Labor	David Feeney	31,780	35.27	−6.02
Liberal	George Souris	17,924	19.89	−2.57
Sex Party	Joel Murray	2,317	2.57	−0.01
Independent	Philip Sutton	1,509	1.67	+0.86
Animal Justice	Caitlin Evans	1,503	1.67	+0.27
Marriage Equality	Elizabeth Syber	682	0.76	+0.76
Renewable Energy	Maurice Oldis	593	0.66	+0.66
Independent	Franco Guardiani	480	0.53	+0.53
Cyclists	Geoffrey Cicuto	386	0.43	+0.43
Progressives	Russell Hayward	282	0.31	+0.31
Total formal votes		90,101	92.22	−2.02
Informal votes		7,601	7.78	+2.02
Turnout		97,702	89.69	−1.91
Notional two-party-preferred count
Labor	David Feeney	64,645	71.75	+0.77
Liberal	George Souris	25,456	28.25	−0.77
Two-candidate-preferred result
Labor	David Feeney	45,977	51.03	−9.58
Greens	Alex Bhathal	44,124	48.97	+9.58
Labor hold		Swing	−9.58	

==== 2013 ====
2013 Australian federal election: Batman
Party	Candidate	Votes	%	±%
Labor	David Feeney	36,798	41.29	−10.62
Greens	Alex Bhathal	23,522	26.40	+2.65
Liberal	George Souris	20,017	22.46	+2.40
Sex Party	Lianna Sliwczynski	2,301	2.58	+2.48
Palmer United	Franco Guardiani	2,253	2.53	+2.53
Animal Justice	Rosemary Lavin	1,250	1.40	+1.40
Family First	Ken Smithies	1,126	1.26	−1.92
Rise Up Australia	Pat Winterton	1,121	1.26	+1.26
Independent Save The Planet	Philip Sutton	726	0.81	+0.81
Total formal votes		89,114	94.24	−0.74
Informal votes		5,450	5.76	+0.74
Turnout		94,564	91.59	−0.28
Notional two-party-preferred count
Labor	David Feeney	63,257	70.98	−3.82
Liberal	George Souris	25,857	29.02	+3.82
Two-candidate-preferred result
Labor	David Feeney	54,009	60.61	+2.86
Greens	Alex Bhathal	35,105	39.39	−2.86
Labor hold		Swing	+2.86	

==== 2010 ====
2010 Australian federal election: Batman
Party	Candidate	Votes	%	±%
Labor	Martin Ferguson	40,574	52.38	−4.80
Greens	Alex Bhathal	18,189	23.48	+6.31
Liberal	George Souris	15,412	19.90	−0.74
Family First	Andrew Conlon	2,465	3.18	+0.56
Democrats	Con Sarazen	823	1.06	−0.97
Total formal votes		77,463	94.85	−1.33
Informal votes		4,202	5.15	+1.33
Turnout		81,665	91.59	−2.61
Two-party-preferred result
Labor	Martin Ferguson	58,028	74.91	−1.04
Liberal	George Souris	19,435	25.09	+1.04
Two-candidate-preferred result
Labor	Martin Ferguson	44,819	57.86	−18.09
Greens	Alex Bhathal	32,644	42.14	+42.14
Labor hold		Swing	−18.09	

=== Elections in the 2000s ===
==== 2007 ====
2007 Australian federal election: Batman
Party	Candidate	Votes	%	±%
Labor	Martin Ferguson	45,551	57.18	+1.65
Liberal	Jonathan Peart	16,439	20.64	−5.31
Greens	Patricia Carey	13,674	17.17	+3.24
Family First	Peter Kerin	2,090	2.62	+1.49
Democrats	Darren Hassan	1,619	2.03	+0.57
Citizens Electoral Council	Robert Barwick	288	0.36	+0.13
Total formal votes		79,661	96.18	+2.02
Informal votes		3,167	3.82	−2.02
Turnout		82,828	94.07	+0.50
Two-party-preferred result
Labor	Martin Ferguson	60,503	75.95	+4.63
Liberal	Jonathan Peart	19,158	24.05	−4.63
Labor hold		Swing	+4.63	

==== 2004 ====
2004 Australian federal election: Batman
Party	Candidate	Votes	%	±%
Labor	Martin Ferguson	41,953	55.53	−3.37
Liberal	Maxwell Gratton	19,603	25.95	+4.22
Greens	Alex Bhathal	10,520	13.93	+2.54
Democrats	Scott Kneebone	1,105	1.46	−4.78
Family First	Chris Ariaratnam	853	1.13	+1.13
Independent	Craig Bishop	708	0.94	+0.94
Socialist Alliance	Graham Matthews	430	0.57	+0.57
Socialist Equality	Peter Byrne	201	0.27	+0.27
Citizens Electoral Council	Walter Hernan Mellado	171	0.23	−0.19
Total formal votes		75,544	94.15	−0.31
Informal votes		4,686	5.84	+0.31
Turnout		80,230	93.57	+0.22
Two-party-preferred result
Labor	Martin Ferguson	53,880	71.32	−3.75
Liberal	Maxwell Gratton	21,664	28.68	+3.75
Labor hold		Swing	−3.75	

==== 2001 ====
2001 Australian federal election: Batman
Party	Candidate	Votes	%	±%
Labor	Martin Ferguson	46,506	58.70	−7.13
Liberal	John Davies	17,196	21.71	+1.48
Greens	Alex Bhathal	9,171	11.58	+6.98
Democrats	Scott Kneebone	4,954	6.25	+1.24
Democratic Socialist	Jackie Lynch	1,064	1.34	+1.34
Citizens Electoral Council	Wayne Barwick	329	0.42	+0.42
Total formal votes		79,220	94.46	−1.63
Informal votes		4,647	5.54	+1.63
Turnout		83,867	93.49	
Two-party-preferred result
Labor	Martin Ferguson	59,478	75.08	−1.35
Liberal	John Davies	19,742	24.92	+1.35
Labor hold		Swing	−3.75	

=== Elections in the 1990s ===
==== 1998 ====
1998 Australian federal election: Batman
Party	Candidate	Votes	%	±%
Labor	Martin Ferguson	53,034	65.84	+7.01
Liberal	Lauri Rowe	16,290	20.22	−1.01
Democrats	Marc Nicholls	4,038	5.01	−1.01
Greens	Helen Rosenbaum	3,705	4.60	+0.99
Natural Law	Martin Richardson	1,486	1.84	−0.95
Militant Socialist	Matt Wilson	1,087	1.35	+1.35
Unity	Sami Mazloum	659	0.82	+0.82
Citizens Electoral Council	Wayne Barwick	254	0.32	+0.32
Total formal votes		80,553	96.09	+1.17
Informal votes		3,280	3.91	−1.17
Turnout		83,833	94.48	−0.75
Two-party-preferred result
Labor	Martin Ferguson	61,569	76.43	+5.12
Liberal	Lauri Rowe	18,984	23.57	−5.12
Labor hold		Swing	+5.12	

==== 1996 ====
1996 Australian federal election: Batman
Party	Candidate	Votes	%	±%
Labor	Martin Ferguson	45,491	58.82	−8.73
Liberal	Wayne Youlten	16,574	21.43	−2.94
Democrats	Julie Peters	4,655	6.02	+2.58
Independent	Irene Bolger	3,976	5.14	+5.14
Greens	Frank Ryan	2,791	3.61	+3.61
Natural Law	Paul D'Angelo	2,165	2.80	+1.86
Independent	George Koumantatakis	1,083	1.40	+1.40
Independent	Arthur Preketes	601	0.78	+0.78
Total formal votes		77,336	94.92	−0.65
Informal votes		3,976	5.14	+0.65
Turnout		81,479	95.23	+0.22
Two-party-preferred result
Labor	Martin Ferguson	54,637	71.31	−3.01
Liberal	Wayne Youlten	21,979	28.69	+3.01
Labor hold		Swing	−3.01	

==== 1993 ====
1993 Australian federal election: Batman
Party	Candidate	Votes	%	±%
Labor	Brian Howe	47,974	67.45	+15.60
Liberal	Mabel Thrupp	17,503	24.61	−2.85
Democrats	Geoff Carr	2,541	3.57	−9.31
	Nigel D'Souza	1,908	2.68	+2.68
Natural Law	Joan Dickens	708	1.00	+1.00
	George Simatkovich	490	0.69	+0.69
Total formal votes		71,124	95.69	+2.03
Informal votes		3,206	4.31	−2.03
Turnout		74,330	95.01	
Two-party-preferred result
Labor	Brian Howe	52,200	73.43	+6.03
Liberal	Mabel Thrupp	18,889	26.57	−6.03
Labor hold		Swing	+6.03	

==== 1990 ====
1990 Australian federal election: Batman
Party	Candidate	Votes	%	±%
Labor	Brian Howe	34,506	51.8	−12.2
Liberal	Ray Ellis	18,274	27.5	+3.2
Democrats	George Gogas	8,574	12.9	+3.2
Call to Australia	Alan Watts	3,950	5.9	+5.9
Democratic Socialist	Nigel D'Souza	1,250	1.9	+1.9
Total formal votes		66,554	93.7	
Informal votes		4,507	6.3	
Turnout		71,061	94.3	
Two-party-preferred result
Labor	Brian Howe	44,754	67.4	−5.4
Liberal	Ray Ellis	21,645	32.6	+5.4
Labor hold		Swing	−5.4	

=== Elections in the 1980s ===
==== 1987 ====
1987 Australian federal election: Batman
Party	Candidate	Votes	%	±%
Labor	Brian Howe	35,285	64.0	−7.6
Liberal	Ron Dunn	13,408	24.3	+3.5
Democrats	Jan Roberts	5,321	9.7	+5.4
Independent	Sue Phillips	632	1.1	+1.1
Independent	Darren Chapman	466	0.8	+0.8
Total formal votes		55,112	90.2	
Informal votes		6,000	9.8	
Turnout		61,112	93.1	
Two-party-preferred result
Labor	Brian Howe	40,041	72.8	−1.9
Liberal	Ron Dunn	14,983	27.2	+1.9
Labor hold		Swing	−1.9	

==== 1984 ====
1984 Australian federal election: Batman
Party	Candidate	Votes	%	±%
Labor	Brian Howe	39,128	71.6	+0.1
Liberal	Mark Hoysted	11,371	20.8	−0.2
Democrats	James Cockell	2,338	4.3	−0.1
Democratic Labor	Philip L'Huillier	1,836	3.4	+0.8
Total formal votes		54,673	87.8	
Informal votes		7,597	12.2	
Turnout		62,270	94.4	
Two-party-preferred result
Labor	Brian Howe	40,845	74.7	−0.2
Liberal	Mark Hoysted	13,807	25.3	+0.2
Labor hold		Swing	−0.2	

==== 1983 ====
1983 Australian federal election: Batman
Party	Candidate	Votes	%	±%
Labor	Brian Howe	42,398	63.7	+8.2
Liberal	Maxwell Playford	19,193	28.8	−2.3
Democrats	Gwendoline Naug	2,836	4.3	−1.7
Democratic Labor	Philip L'Huillier	1,756	2.6	−4.8
Socialist Workers	John Percy	380	0.6	+0.6
Total formal votes		66,563	97.1	
Informal votes		1,983	2.9	
Turnout		68,546	95.7	
Two-party-preferred result
Labor	Brian Howe		77.1	+6.4
Liberal	Maxwell Playford		22.9	−6.4
Labor hold		Swing	+6.4	

==== 1980 ====
1980 Australian federal election: Batman
Party	Candidate	Votes	%	±%
Labor	Brian Howe	37,065	55.5	+8.2
Liberal	Rosemary Kemp	20,785	31.1	−6.3
Democratic Labor	Allen Doyle	4,945	7.4	+2.1
Democrats	Jeffrey McAlpine	4,002	6.0	−4.0
Total formal votes		66,797	97.1	
Informal votes		2,004	2.9	
Turnout		68,801	94.3	
Two-party-preferred result
Labor	Brian Howe		60.7	+7.3
Liberal	Rosemary Kemp		39.3	−7.3
Labor hold		Swing	+7.3	

=== Elections in the 1970s ===
==== 1977 ====
1977 Australian federal election: Batman
Party	Candidate	Votes	%	±%
Labor	Brian Howe	31,538	47.3	−4.6
Liberal	Gillford Brown	24,932	37.4	−3.3
Democrats	Mario Piraino	6,644	10.0	+10.0
Democratic Labor	Phillip Lorenz	3,559	5.3	−2.1
Total formal votes		66,673	96.5	
Informal votes		2,392	3.5	
Turnout		69,065	95.7	
Two-party-preferred result
Labor	Brian Howe	35,581	53.4	+0.9
Liberal	Gillford Brown	31,092	46.6	−0.9
Labor hold		Swing	+0.9	

==== 1975 ====
1975 Australian federal election: Batman
Party	Candidate	Votes	%	±%
Labor	Horrie Garrick	30,570	53.8	−3.3
Liberal	Michael Galli	22,077	38.8	+7.3
Democratic Labor	Eileen Doyle	4,189	7.4	−1.4
Total formal votes		56,836	97.7	
Informal votes		1,355	2.3	
Turnout		58,191	94.7	
Two-party-preferred result
Labor	Horrie Garrick		54.4	−6.0
Liberal	Michael Galli		45.6	+6.0
Labor hold		Swing	−6.0	

==== 1974 ====
1974 Australian federal election: Batman
Party	Candidate	Votes	%	±%
Labor	Horrie Garrick	32,512	57.1	+1.2
Liberal	Keith Smith	17,953	31.5	−2.9
Democratic Labor	Kevin Barry	5,018	8.8	−1.0
Australia	Geoffrey Loftus-Hills	1,493	2.6	+2.6
Total formal votes		56,976	97.2	
Informal votes		1,629	2.8	
Turnout		58,605	94.7	
Two-party-preferred result
Labor	Horrie Garrick		60.4	+3.5
Liberal	Keith Smith		39.6	−3.5
Labor hold		Swing	+3.5	

==== 1972 ====
1972 Australian federal election: Batman
Party	Candidate	Votes	%	±%
Labor	Horrie Garrick	29,578	55.9	+9.4
Liberal	Leon Bram	18,200	34.4	+1.3
Democratic Labor	Henry Darroch	5,163	9.8	−4.9
Total formal votes		52,941	97.3	
Informal votes		1,480	2.7	
Turnout		54,421	94.4	
Two-party-preferred result
Labor	Horrie Garrick		56.9	+3.9
Liberal	Leon Bram		45.1	−3.9
Labor hold		Swing	+3.9	

=== Elections in the 1960s ===
==== 1969 ====
1969 Australian federal election: Batman
Party	Candidate	Votes	%	±%
Labor	Horrie Garrick	24,686	46.5	+5.5
Liberal	Peter McGrath	17,567	33.1	+6.2
Democratic Labor	Henry Darroch	7,776	14.7	−2.0
Independent	Ronald Hayles	3,005	5.7	+5.7
Total formal votes		53,034	95.5	
Informal votes		2,497	4.5	
Turnout		55,531	94.5	
Two-party-preferred result
Labor	Horrie Garrick	28,117	53.0	+0.2
Liberal	Peter McGrath	24,917	47.0	−0.2
Labor gain from Independent		Swing	+0.2	

==== 1966 ====
1966 Australian federal election: Batman
Party	Candidate	Votes	%	±%
Labor	John Andersen	14,859	38.4	−10.4
Liberal	Bruce Skeggs	10,398	26.9	−9.8
Independent	Sam Benson	8,697	22.5	+22.5
Democratic Labor	Henry Darroch	3,592	9.3	−5.2
Liberal Reform Group	Robert Desailly	1,117	2.9	+2.9
Total formal votes		38,663	95.9	
Informal votes		1,668	4.1	
Turnout		40,331	95.5	
Two-party-preferred result
Independent	Sam Benson	22,342	57.8	+57.8
Labor	John Andersen	16,321	42.2	−8.7
Independent gain from Labor		Swing	+8.7	

==== 1963 ====
1963 Australian federal election: Batman
Party	Candidate	Votes	%	±%
Labor	Sam Benson	19,858	48.8	−6.1
Liberal	Bruce Skeggs	14,923	36.7	+6.0
Democratic Labor	Jack Little	5,880	14.5	+0.1
Total formal votes		40,661	98.2	
Informal votes		725	1.8	
Turnout		41,386	96.6	
Two-party-preferred result
Labor	Sam Benson	20,682	50.9	−4.5
Liberal	Bruce Skeggs	19,979	49.1	+4.5
Labor hold		Swing	−4.5	

==== 1962 by-election ====
Batman by-election, 1962
Party	Candidate	Votes	%	±%
Labor	Sam Benson	21,776	60.1	+5.2
Liberal Forum	Donald McLeod	7,026	19.4	+19.4
Democratic Labor	Jack Little	6,811	18.8	+4.4
Republican	John Phillips	304	0.8	+0.8
Independent	Stirling Davis	302	0.8	+0.8
Total formal votes		36,219	97.5	
Informal votes		939	2.5	
Turnout		37,158	85.1	
Two-party-preferred result
Labor	Sam Benson		62.8	+7.4
Liberal Forum	Donald McLeod		37.2	+37.2
Labor hold		Swing	+7.4	

==== 1961 ====
1961 Australian federal election: Batman
Party	Candidate	Votes	%	±%
Labor	Alan Bird	22,831	54.9	+3.4
Liberal	Bruce Skeggs	12,753	30.7	−3.2
Democratic Labor	Maurice Keady	5,970	14.4	−0.2
Total formal votes		41,554	97.8	
Informal votes		941	2.2	
Turnout		42,495	95.6	
Two-party-preferred result
Labor	Alan Bird		55.4	+2.4
Liberal	Bruce Skeggs		44.6	−2.4
Labor hold		Swing	+2.4	

=== Elections in the 1950s ===
==== 1958 ====
1958 Australian federal election: Batman
Party	Candidate	Votes	%	±%
Labor	Alan Bird	21,902	51.5	+1.8
Liberal	Fred Capp	14,443	33.9	−1.1
Democratic Labor	Tom Walsh	6,205	14.6	−0.7
Total formal votes		42,550	97.9	
Informal votes		918	2.1	
Turnout		43,468	95.8	
Two-party-preferred result
Labor	Alan Bird		53.0	+1.3
Liberal	Fred Capp		47.0	−1.3
Labor hold		Swing	+1.3	

==== 1955 ====
1955 Australian federal election: Batman
Party	Candidate	Votes	%	±%
Labor	Alan Bird	21,295	49.7	−9.1
Liberal	Fred Capp	14,972	35.0	−4.6
Labor (A-C)	Tom Walsh	6,553	15.3	+15.3
Total formal votes		42,820	97.7	
Informal votes		1,021	2.3	
Turnout		43,841	94.5	
Two-party-preferred result
Labor	Alan Bird	22,146	51.7	−7.9
Liberal	Fred Capp	20,674	48.3	+7.9
Labor hold		Swing	−7.9	

==== 1954 ====
1954 Australian federal election: Batman
Party	Candidate	Votes	%	±%
Labor	Alan Bird	21,250	57.8	−2.8
Liberal	Neil McKay	14,732	40.1	+0.7
Communist	Andy Wallace	801	2.2	+2.2
Total formal votes		36,783	99.0	
Informal votes		386	1.0	
Turnout		37,169	94.9	
Two-party-preferred result
Labor	Alan Bird		59.8	−0.8
Liberal	Neil McKay		40.2	+0.8
Labor hold		Swing	−0.8	

==== 1951 ====
1951 Australian federal election: Batman
Party	Candidate	Votes	%	±%
Labor	Alan Bird	23,335	60.6	+2.2
Liberal	Fred Capp	15,184	39.4	−2.2
Total formal votes		38,519	98.3	
Informal votes		673	1.7	
Turnout		39,192	95.8	
Labor hold		Swing	+2.2	

=== Elections in the 1940s ===
==== 1949 ====
1949 Australian federal election: Batman
Party	Candidate	Votes	%	±%
Labor	Alan Bird	22,662	58.4	+4.3
Liberal	Neil McKay	16,139	41.6	+3.3
Total formal votes		38,801	98.6	
Informal votes		544	1.4	
Turnout		39,345	95.9	
Labor hold		Swing	−1.1	

==== 1946 ====
1946 Australian federal election: Batman
Party	Candidate	Votes	%	±%
Labor	Frank Brennan	39,754	58.3	−6.0
Liberal	John McColl	20,930	30.7	+9.8
Independent	Allan Brennan	4,250	6.2	+6.2
Communist	George Oke	3,222	4.7	+4.7
Total formal votes		68,156	97.3	
Informal votes		1,881	2.7	
Turnout		70,037	95.7	
Two-party-preferred result
Labor	Frank Brennan		66.7	−7.9
Liberal	John McColl		33.3	+7.9
Labor hold		Swing	−7.9	

==== 1943 ====
1943 Australian federal election: Batman
Party	Candidate	Votes	%	±%
Labor	Frank Brennan	42,073	64.3	+4.6
United Australia	Arthur McAdam	13,647	20.9	−19.4
Services and Citizens	Ian Malloch	7,635	11.7	+11.7
Independent	Joseph Cahir	1,090	1.7	+1.7
Independent	Christina Debney	590	0.9	+0.9
Services	Gordon Currie	380	0.6	+0.6
Total formal votes		65,415	96.9	
Informal votes		2,070	3.1	
Turnout		67,485	98.4	
Two-party-preferred result
Labor	Frank Brennan		74.6	+14.9
United Australia	Arthur McAdam		25.4	−14.9
Labor hold		Swing	+14.9	

==== 1940 ====
1940 Australian federal election: Batman
Party	Candidate	Votes	%	±%
Labor	Frank Brennan	35,636	59.7	−3.7
United Australia	Albert Peters	24,082	40.3	+3.7
Total formal votes		59,718	98.2	
Informal votes		1,080	1.8	
Turnout		60,798	96.4	
Labor hold		Swing	−3.7	

=== Elections in the 1930s ===
==== 1937 ====
1937 Australian federal election: Batman
Party	Candidate	Votes	%	±%
Labor	Frank Brennan	36,439	63.4	+8.6
United Australia	Albert Peters	21,013	36.6	−8.6
Total formal votes		57,452	98.2	
Informal votes		1,037	1.8	
Turnout		58,489	96.9	
Labor hold		Swing	+8.6	

==== 1934 ====
1934 Australian federal election: Batman
Party	Candidate	Votes	%	±%
Labor	Frank Brennan	36,910	56.1	+10.5
United Australia	Samuel Dennis	28,846	43.9	−4.9
Total formal votes		65,756	97.3	
Informal votes		1,790	2.7	
Turnout		67,546	96.0	
Labor gain from United Australia		Swing	+6.9	

==== 1931 ====
1931 Australian federal election: Batman
Party	Candidate	Votes	%	±%
United Australia	Samuel Dennis	30,148	48.8	+24.6
Labor	Frank Brennan	28,198	45.6	−30.2
Independent	Frank Blake	2,323	3.8	+3.8
Communist	Jim Hannan	1,156	1.9	+1.9
Total formal votes		61,825	96.0	
Informal votes		2,606	4.0	
Turnout		64,431	94.9	
Two-party-preferred result
United Australia	Samuel Dennis	31,393	50.8	+26.6
Labor	Frank Brennan	30,432	49.2	−26.6
United Australia gain from Labor		Swing	+26.6	

=== Elections in the 1920s ===
==== 1929 ====
1929 Australian federal election: Batman
Party	Candidate	Votes	%	±%
Labor	Frank Brennan	46,666	75.8	+12.0
Nationalist	Cecil Keeley	14,891	24.2	−12.0
Total formal votes		61,557	98.2	
Informal votes		1,158	1.8	
Turnout		62,715	94.9	
Labor hold		Swing	+12.0	

==== 1928 ====
1928 Australian federal election: Batman
Party	Candidate	Votes	%	±%
Labor	Frank Brennan	37,947	63.8	+4.8
Nationalist	Angus McDonald	21,512	36.2	−4.8
Total formal votes		59,459	96.5	
Informal votes		2,170	3.5	
Turnout		61,629	91.8	
Labor hold		Swing	+4.8	

==== 1925 ====
1925 Australian federal election: Batman
Party	Candidate	Votes	%	±%
Labor	Frank Brennan	32,427	59.0	+8.0
Nationalist	Samuel Dennis	22,513	41.0	+18.1
Total formal votes		54,940	98.6	
Informal votes		744	1.4	
Turnout		55,684	92.9	
Labor hold		Swing	+5.7	

==== 1922 ====
1922 Australian federal election: Batman
Party	Candidate	Votes	%	±%
Labor	Frank Brennan	14,042	51.0	−1.9
Independent Labor	Martin Hannah	7,174	26.1	+26.1
Nationalist	George Mackay	6,531	22.9	−24.2
Total formal votes		27,531	96.9	
Informal votes		867	3.1	
Turnout		28,398	60.9	
Two-party-preferred result
Labor	Frank Brennan		53.3	+0.4
Independent Labor	Martin Hannah		46.7	+46.7
Labor hold		Swing	+0.4	

=== Elections in the 1910s ===
==== 1919 ====
1919 Australian federal election: Batman
Party	Candidate	Votes	%	±%
Labor	Frank Brennan	16,039	57.1	−3.8
Nationalist	William Spence	12,064	42.9	+3.8
Total formal votes		28,103	98.4	
Informal votes		466	1.6	
Turnout		28,569	76.8	
Labor hold		Swing	−3.8	

==== 1917 ====
1917 Australian federal election: Batman
Party	Candidate	Votes	%	±%
Labor	Frank Brennan	18,868	60.9	−39.1
Nationalist	Frederick O'Neill	12,098	39.1	+39.1
Total formal votes		30,966	97.0	
Informal votes		950	3.0	
Turnout		31,916	88.9	
Labor hold		Swing	−39.1	

==== 1914 ====
1914 Australian federal election: Batman
Party	Candidate	Votes	%	±%
Labor	Frank Brennan	unopposed		
Labor hold		Swing		

==== 1913 ====
1913 Australian federal election: Batman
Party	Candidate	Votes	%	±%
Labor	Frank Brennan	19,268	64.9	+2.7
Liberal	Frederick O'Neill	10,398	35.1	−2.7
Total formal votes		29,666	98.2	
Informal votes		538	1.8	
Turnout		30,204	71.3	
Labor hold		Swing	+2.7	

==== 1911 by-election ====
1911 Batman by-election
Party	Candidate	Votes	%	±%
Labour	Frank Brennan	9,385	57.52	−6.09
Liberal	Frederick O'Neill	6,932	42.48	+6.09
Total formal votes		16,317	97.86	−0.63
Informal votes		356	2.14	+0.63
Registered electors		31,729		
Turnout		16,673	52.55	−16.34
Labour hold		Swing	−6.09	

==== 1910 ====
1910 Australian federal election: Batman
Party	Candidate	Votes	%	±%
Labour	Henry Beard	13,569	63.6	+17.0
Liberal	Jabez Coon	7,765	36.4	−13.6
Total formal votes		21,334	98.5	
Informal votes		327	1.5	
Turnout		21,661	68.9	
Labour gain from Liberal		Swing	+15.3	

=== Elections in the 1900s ===
==== 1906 ====
1906 Australian federal election: Batman
Party	Candidate	Votes	%	±%
Protectionist	Jabez Coon	7,098	50.0	+50.0
Labour	Robert Solly	6,617	46.6	+46.6
Independent	Samuel Painter	330	2.3	+2.3
Ind. Protectionist	Roy Vernon	151	1.1	+1.1
Total formal votes		14,196	95.0	
Informal votes		743	5.0	
Turnout		14,939	48.8	
Protectionist win		(new seat)		
