= Batman by-election =

Batman by-election may refer to:

- 1911 Batman by-election – 1911 Australian federal by-election
- 1962 Batman by-election – 1962 Australian federal by-election
- 2018 Batman by-election – 2018 Australian federal by-election
