= Electoral results for the Division of Cooper =

Australian division election results

This is a list of electoral results for the Division of Cooper in Australian federal elections from the division's creation in 2019 until the present.

== Members ==
Member	Party	Term
Ged Kearney	Labor	2019–present

== Election results ==
=== Elections in the 2020s ===
==== 2025 ====
2025 Australian federal election: Cooper
Party	Candidate	Votes	%	±%
One Nation	William Turner			
Labor	Ged Kearney			
Greens	Tara Burnett			
Liberal	Stewart Todhunter			
Victorian Socialists	Kath Larkin			
Legalise Cannabis	Donna Stolzenberg			
Total formal votes				
Informal votes				
Turnout				

==== 2022 ====
2022 Australian federal election: Cooper
Party	Candidate	Votes	%	±%
Labor	Ged Kearney	38,754	41.34	−5.52
Greens	Celeste Liddle	25,648	27.36	+6.43
Liberal	Jadon Atkinson	15,329	16.35	−3.25
United Australia	Adam La Rosa	4,170	4.45	+2.48
Victorian Socialists	Kath Larkin	3,250	3.47	−0.75
One Nation	William Turner	2,807	2.99	+2.99
Animal Justice	Rabin Bangaar	2,207	2.35	−0.20
Fusion	Adrian Whitehead	1,585	1.69	+1.69
Total formal votes		93,750	95.74	+0.66
Informal votes		4,169	4.26	−0.66
Turnout		97,919	90.16	−2.18
Notional two-party-preferred count
Labor	Ged Kearney	70,743	75.46	−0.75
Liberal	Jadon Atkinson	23,007	24.54	+0.75
Two-candidate-preferred result
Labor	Ged Kearney	55,006	58.67	−6.16
Greens	Celeste Liddle	38,744	41.33	+6.16
Labor hold		Swing	−6.16	

Alluvial diagram for preference flows in the seat of Cooper in the 2022 federal election. indicates at what stage the winning candidate had over 50% of the votes and was declared the winner.

=== Elections in the 2010s ===
==== 2019 ====
2019 Australian federal election: Cooper
Party	Candidate	Votes	%	±%
Labor	Ged Kearney	45,601	46.78	+11.73
Greens	David Risstrom	20,605	21.14	−15.53
Liberal	Andrew Bell	19,012	19.50	−0.20
Victorian Socialists	Kath Larkin	4,125	4.23	+4.23
Animal Justice	Nadine Richings	2,476	2.54	+0.87
Reason	Sarah Russell	2,110	2.16	+2.16
United Australia	Brett Nangle	1,892	1.94	+1.94
Independent	Teresa van Lieshout	1,660	1.70	+1.70
Total formal votes		97,481	95.13	+2.77
Informal votes		4,986	4.87	−2.77
Turnout		102,467	92.45	+2.94
Notional two-party-preferred count
Labor	Ged Kearney	74,402	76.32	+4.23
Liberal	Andrew Bell	23,079	23.68	−4.23
Two-candidate-preferred result
Labor	Ged Kearney	63,017	64.65	+13.38
Greens	David Risstrom	34,464	35.35	−13.38
Labor hold		Swing	+13.38	
