= 1962 Batman by-election =

Australian federal by-election

A by-election was held for the Australian House of Representatives seat of Batman in Victoria (Australia) on 1 September 1962. It was triggered by the death of Labor MP Alan Bird.

The by-election was won by Labor candidate Sam Benson. The governing Liberal Party did not nominate a candidate, leaving the candidate of the so-called Liberal Forum, an ally of Douglas Darby, an Independent New South Wales state parliamentarian, to take second place.

== Results ==
Batman by-election, 1962
Party	Candidate	Votes	%	±%
Labor	Sam Benson	21,776	60.1	+5.2
Liberal Forum	Donald McLeod	7,026	19.4	+19.4
Democratic Labor	Jack Little	6,811	18.8	+4.4
Republican	John Phillips	304	0.8	+0.8
Independent	Stirling Davis	302	0.8	+0.8
Total formal votes		36,219	97.5	
Informal votes		939	2.5	
Turnout		37,158	85.1	
Two-party-preferred result
Labor	Sam Benson		62.8	+7.4
Liberal Forum	Donald McLeod		37.2	+37.2
Labor hold		Swing	+7.4	
