= Ged Kearney =

Australian politician (born 1963)

The Honourable Ged Kearney MP
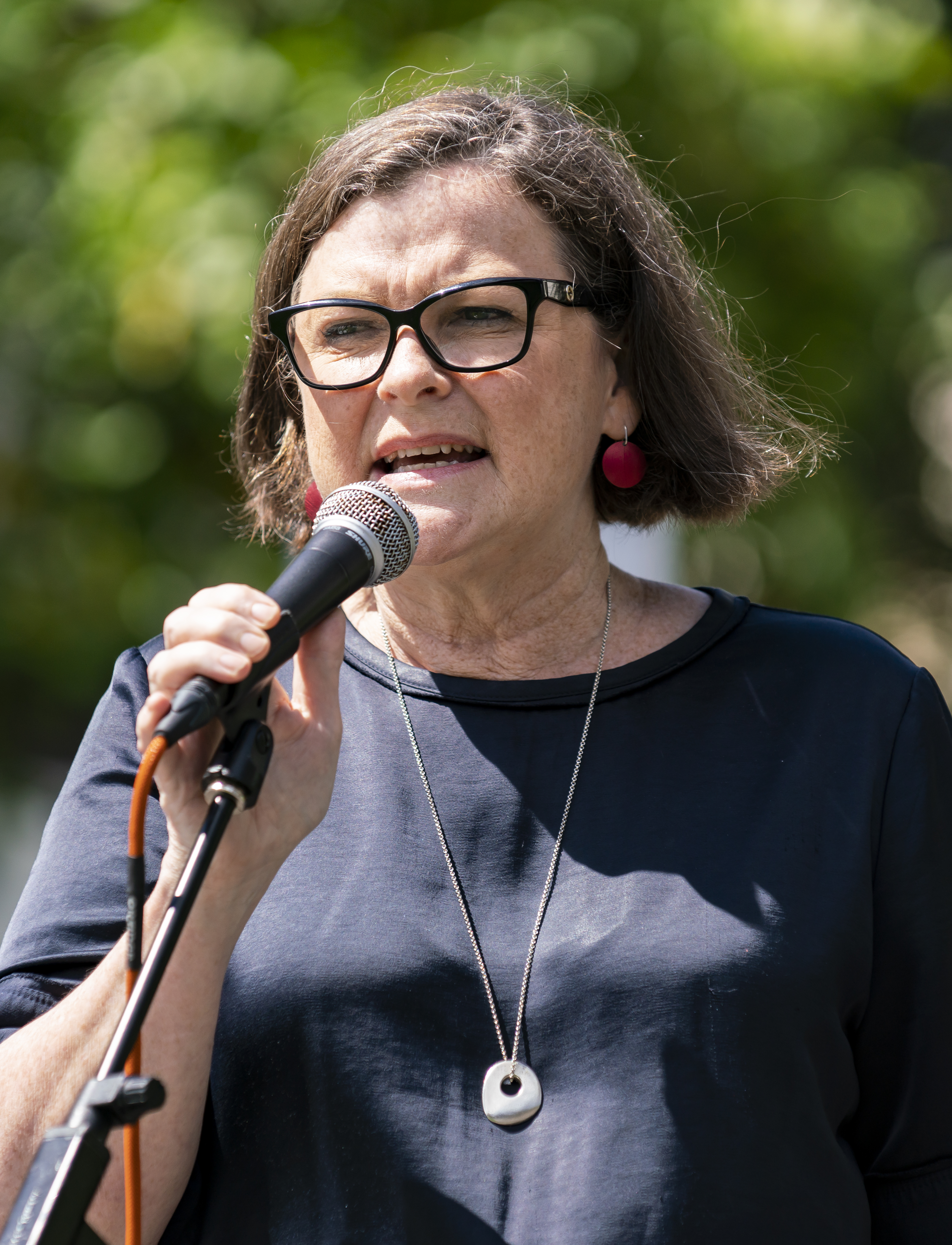
- Kearney at a rally for refugee rights in 2022

Assistant Minister for Social Services
- Incumbent
- Assumed office 13 May 2025
- Prime Minister: Anthony Albanese
- Preceded by: Justine Elliot

Assistant Minister for the Prevention of Family Violence
- Incumbent
- Assumed office 13 May 2025
- Prime Minister: Anthony Albanese
- Preceded by: Justine Elliot

Assistant Minister for Health and Aged Care
- In office 1 June 2022 – 13 May 2025
- Prime Minister: Anthony Albanese
- Preceded by: David Gillespie(2017)
- Succeeded by: Rebecca White

Member of the Australian Parliament for Cooper
- Incumbent
- Assumed office 18 May 2019
- Preceded by: Division created

Member of the Australian Parliament for Batman
- In office 17 March 2018 – 18 May 2019
- Preceded by: David Feeney
- Succeeded by: Division abolished

10th President of the ACTU
- In office 1 July 2010 – 2 February 2018
- Preceded by: Sharan Burrow
- Succeeded by: Michele O'Neil

Personal details
- Born: Gerardine Mary Kearney; 29 October 1963 (age 63) East Melbourne, Victoria, Australia
- Party: Labor
- Profession: Nurse; Trade unionist Politician
- Website: www.gedkearney.org.au

Gerardine Mary "Ged" Kearney (born 29 October 1963) is an Australian politician and trade unionist who is a member of the Australian Parliament for the Division of Cooper. She is a member of the Australian Labor Party. Since 2025, Kearney has served as Assistant Minister for Social Services and Assistant Minister for the Prevention of Family Violence in the Albanese government. Kearney has been a member of the House of Representatives since March 2018, formerly representing the Division of Batman. Prior to entering politics, she served as president of the Australian Council of Trade Unions (ACTU) from 2010 to 2018.

== Early life ==
Gerardine Mary Kearney was born on 29 October 1963 in East Melbourne, Victoria, Australia; she grew up in Richmond as the second-youngest of nine siblings. Her father was a publican. Kearney attended secondary school at Academy of Mary Immaculate in Fitzroy and began to study for a Bachelor of Economics degree at Monash University but ended her studies to pursue a career in nursing. She qualified as a registered nurse in 1985 and participated in a nurses' strike in 1986. She gained a Bachelor of Education, and worked as a nurse and nurse educator, managing clinical-nurse education at Austin Health.

When Kearney was 21, she became pregnant with twins, leading her to take leave from her nursing training. She returned to her training when her children were seven weeks old.

== Career ==
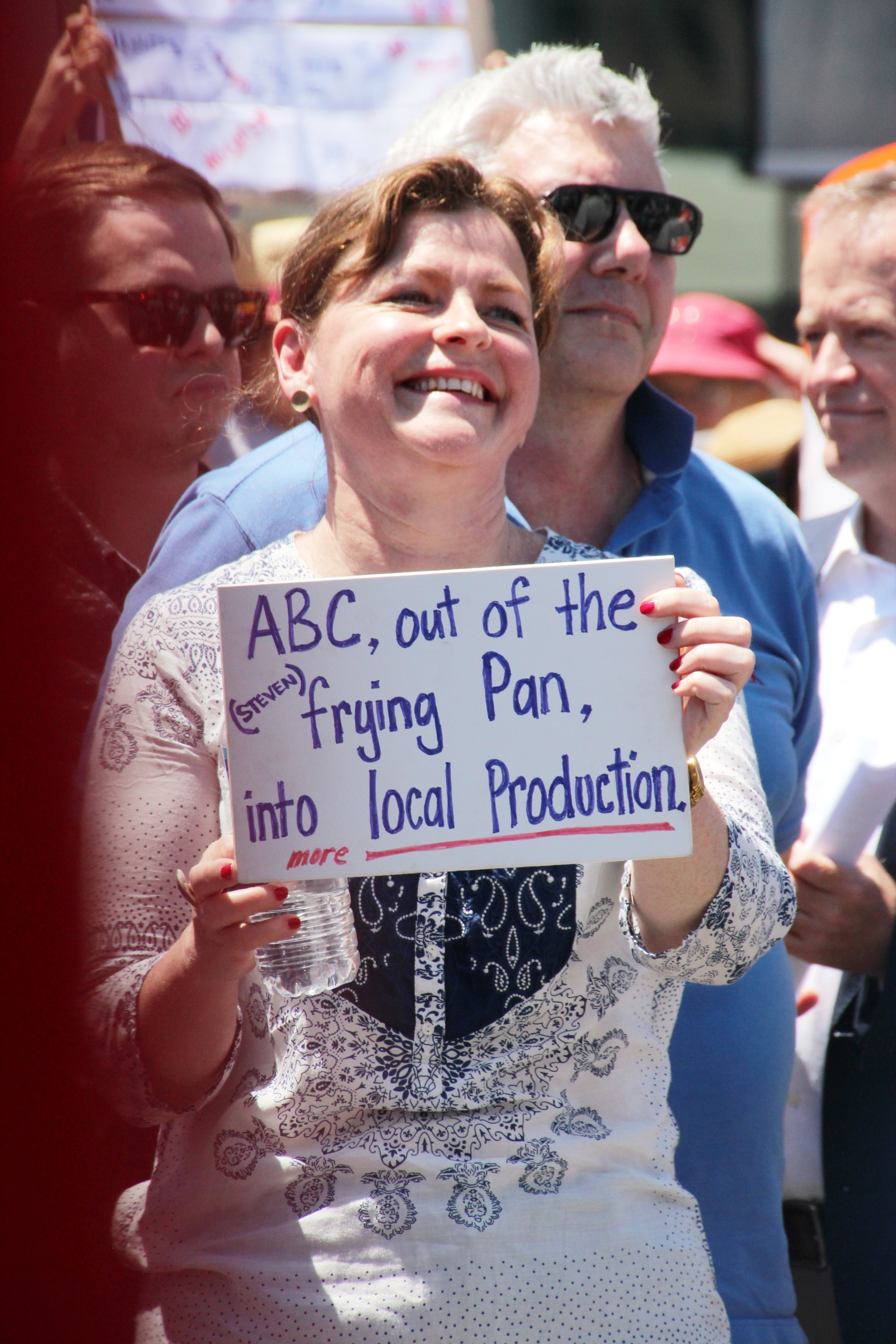
Kearney at a 2014 rally in Federation Square, protesting against cuts to the ABC and SBS budgets

In 1997, Kearney was elected as an official of the Australian Nursing Federation; she served as assistant federal secretary, federal president and Victorian-branch president before she was appointed as federal secretary of the Federation in April 2008. On 1 July 2010, following the departure of Sharan Burrow, Kearney was elected president of the ACTU. At the time, the president of the Australian Workers' Union Paul Howes criticised the election process as "undemocratic" because of the exclusion of right-wing-aligned unions from the election process. In response, Kearney stated she had received the support of "70% of unions" within the ACTU.

In December 2011, Kearney and other trade unionists were deported from Fiji under the emergency laws put in place following the Fijian constitutional crisis of 2009. In July 2012, Kearney announced the ACTU would donate to Fiji A$2.6 million to assist in the running of democratic elections.

In April 2012, Kearney announced the ACTU would suspend the membership of the Health Services Union following the Health Services Union expenses affair, which she described as "a bad look" for the union movement. In the following month, Kearney addressed a conference of the ACTU and she stated the "misuse of members' money and contempt for the accountability to members [is] unacceptable".

In July 2012, immigration minister Chris Bowen created the Ministerial Advisory Council on Skilled Migration (MACSM) and appointed Kearney as one of its nine members. In 2017, Kearney resigned from the MACSM, stating the body had become "ineffective" and "unbalanced".

In 2015, as ACTU president, Kearney called on Prime Minister of Australia Tony Abbott to remove Dyson Heydon from his leadership of the Royal Commission into Trade Union Governance and Corruption after Heydon agreed to speak at a Liberal Party fundraising dinner. Kearney also stated the ACTU was considering taking the matter to the High Court but this did not occur. Kearney had previously labelled the royal commission "an expensive stunt".

== Early political career ==
In May 2013, in the lead up to the 2013 federal election, Kearney said she was considering nominating herself for Labor preselection in the Division of Batman, a seat that was being vacated following the retirement of Martin Ferguson. Kearney later decided not to contest preselection. In 2017, Kearney was a candidate for Labor preselection in the Victorian seat of Brunswick, a seat that was being vacated by Jane Garrett, who had moved to the Legislative Council. Cindy O'Connor was preselected as the Labor candidate over Kearney and was defeated at the 2018 state election by Greens candidate Tim Read.

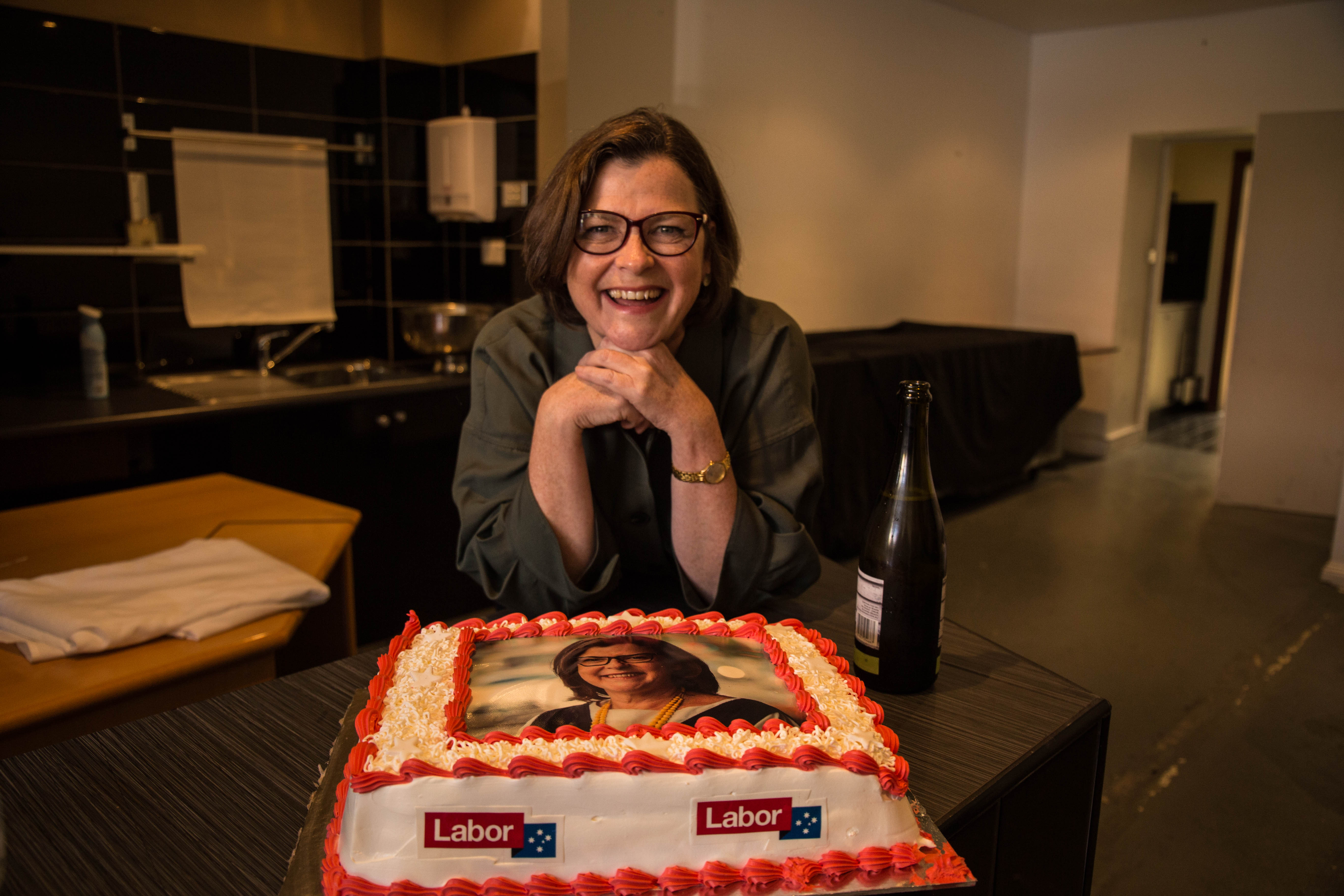
Kearney celebrating on the night of her victory in Batman

In February 2018, a by-election was announced in the seat of Batman following the resignation of David Feeney due to the 2017–2018 Australian parliamentary eligibility crisis. Labor preselected Kearney to contest the by-election and on 2 February 2018, she resigned as president of the ACTU to campaign. Kearney's main opponent was Greens candidate Alex Bhathal, who had already run for the seat five times. Controversy around the proposed Adani Carmichael coal mine was a significant feature of the by-election campaign, during which Labor leader Bill Shorten stated his "scepticism" of the coal mine; Kearney also criticised of the project but did not commit to blocking it. The Australian Conservation Foundation distributed material stating only the Greens would "stop Adani's mine from going ahead". Activist group GetUp! stated they would not assist Labor in campaigning due to Labor's position on the coal mine.

During the by-election campaign, Kearney received the personal endorsement of former Prime Minister Julia Gillard, who wrote a letter that was distributed to 36,000 houses within the electorate. Kearney was also endorsed by EMILY's List Australia, a Labor-aligned organisation that advocates for representation of women in parliament. Kearney won the by-election on 17 March 2018 with 43.20% of the primary votes and 54.43% of votes after distribution of preferences.

== Member of Parliament ==
In her maiden speech as an MP, Gerardine Kearney advocated for a "humane refugee policy" in Australia and called for an end to offshore detention of asylum seekers. In July 2018, the Australian Electoral Commission redrew Batman's boundaries and renamed it Cooper after Indigenous activist William Cooper. Kearney was subsequently elected at the 2019 federal election for Cooper, receiving 64.83% of the two-candidate preferred vote.

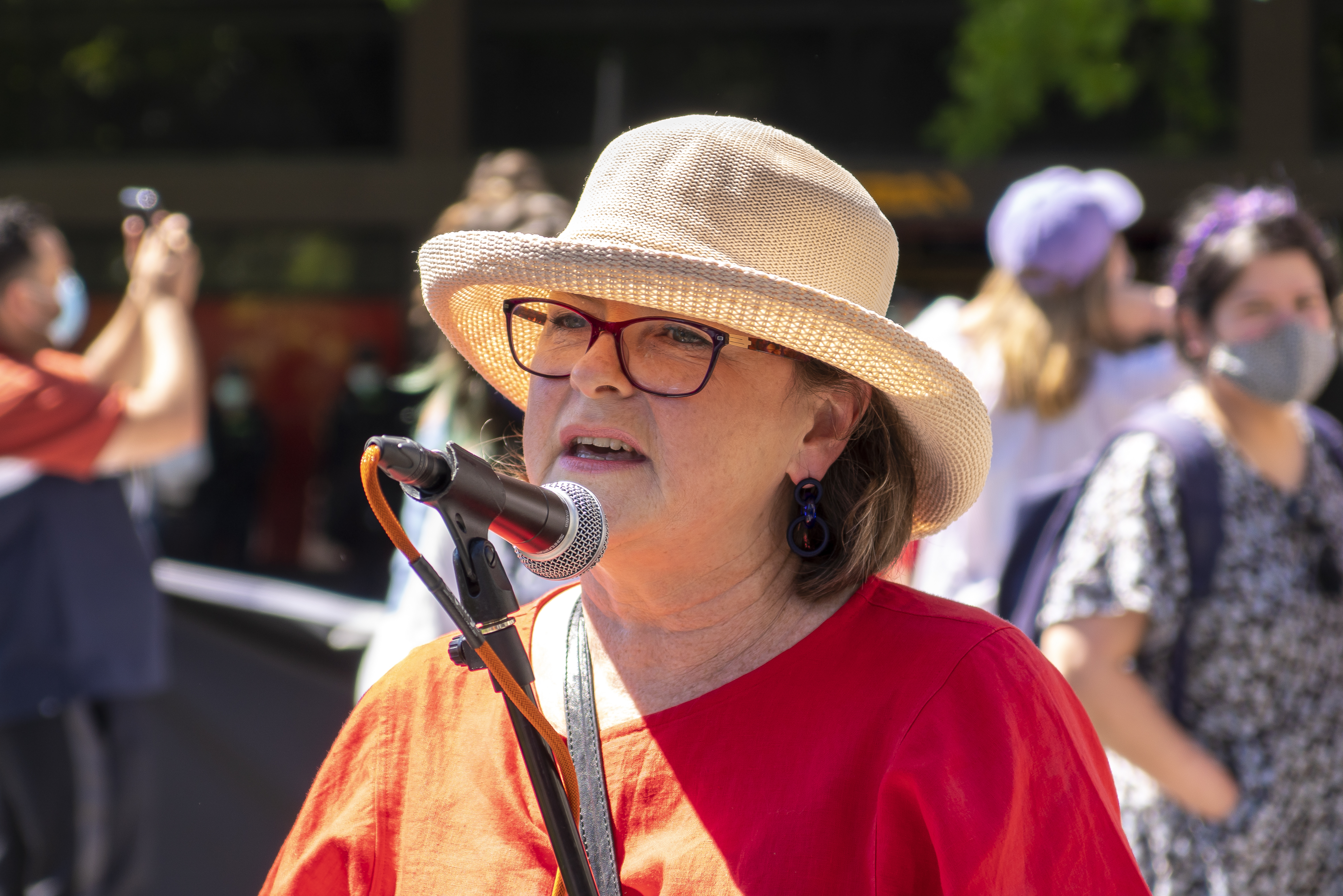
Kearney in 2021, speaking at a Melbourne rally, calling for refugees detained in an Australian hotel under the Medevac legislation to be freed.

Following the 2019 federal election, Opposition Leader Anthony Albanese appointed Kearney into his shadow ministry as the Shadow Assistant Minister for Skills and the Shadow Assistant Minister for Aged Care. In July 2019, Kearney joined the Parliamentary Committee for Employment, Education and Training. Following a shadow cabinet reshuffle in January 2021, Kearney was appointed as Shadow Assistant Minister for Health and Ageing.

In July 2020, Kearney left the Industrial Left faction for the Labor Left faction.

In June 2021, Kearney and two other female Labor MPs wrote to the Prime Minister Scott Morrison, calling for him to dismiss the committee chair Andrew Laming over his behaviour towards women. Following Labor's success in the 2022 federal election, Prime Minister Anthony Albanese appointed Kearney Assistant Minister for Health and Aged Care on 1 June 2022. In December that year, Kearney was also appointed to chair the newly formed National Women's Health Advisory Council, which was established to look at ways of improving health outcomes for women and girls, and tackling "medical misogyny". On 1 July 2022, Kearney announced the self-collection of samples for cervical-cancer testing would become available. On 22 November 2023, Kearney announced the National Strategy for the Elimination of Cervical Cancer, along with A$48.2 million for its implementation. The strategy includes measures such as achieving a 90% vaccination rate amongst boys for human papillomavirus (HPV).

On 15 November 2023, fake corpses were placed outside the electorate offices of Kearney and other MPs as part of a protest against the government's position on the Gaza war.

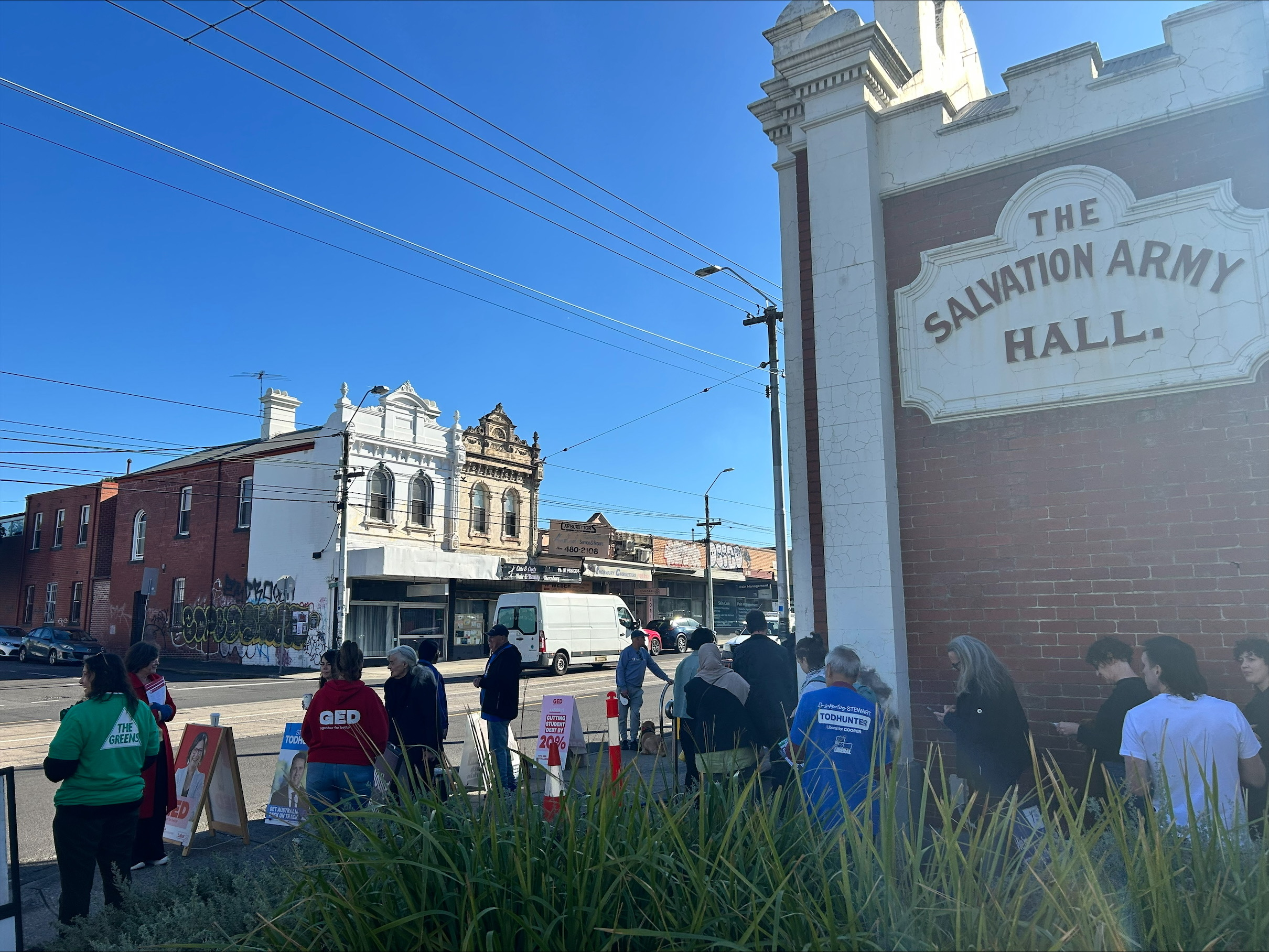
Polling place in Cooper at the 2025 federal election. Kearney is visible second from left.

On 3 December 2023, Kearney attended that year's United Nations Climate Change Conference (COP28) and delivered a speech announcing the Australian National Health and Climate Strategy, whose priorities included "Health system decarbonisation" and "Resilience actions". The Australian Healthcare and Hospitals Association and Asthma Australia welcomed the strategy, and Dietitians Australia praised it for including a review of "nutrition and sustainability standards" in healthcare. Doctors for the Environment Australia (DEA) stated the strategy was "an important step forward" and the DEA executive director stated the government must "phase out fossil fuels if it's serious about protecting lives".

After the re-election of the Albanese government in the 2025 federal election, Kearney was moved to the role of Assistant Minister for Social Services and Assistant Minister for the Prevention of Family Violence in the second Albanese ministry.

== Political positions ==
Kearney is a supporter of an Indigenous Voice to Parliament and campaigned in favour of its introduction in the unsuccessful 2023 referendum. On 4 September 2023 on the Australian political television talk show Q+A, Kearney said:

This [the Voice] was a very generous request made of us by First Nations people, through a very broad process of consultation, and that culminated in the Uluru Statement from the Heart, which asked us to do this ... It was a very generous offer that was made, given 200 years of colonisation.

Kearney is a supporter of LGBT rights and participated in the Sydney WorldPride march in March 2023. Along with Health Minister Mark Butler, Kearney set up and now chairs the federal government HIV taskforce. At the national Labor conference in 2023, Kearney and Butler supported a motion that called for the removal of a blanket restriction that prevents gay men, bisexual men and transgender women from donating blood. Kearney also chairs the LGBTIQA+ Health and Wellbeing 10 Year National Action Plan Expert Advisory Group, which is responsible for developing a national plan for LGBTIQA+ health.

Kearney is a member of the Australian All-Party Parliamentary Group for Tibet.

== Personal life ==
Kearney has four children. In 2020, Kearney's father-in-law died after contracting COVID-19 in Canberra; his was the thirtieth death from COVID-19 in Australia. Kearney owns her home in Brunswick as well as investment property and land in Queensland.

Parliament of Australia
Preceded by David Feeney	Member for Batman; 2018–2019	Division abolished
New division	Member for Cooper; 2019–present	Incumbent
