= Division of Batman =

Former Australian federal electoral division

Batman Australian House of Representatives Division
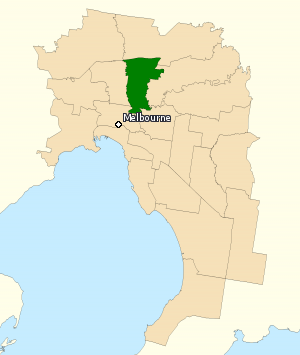
- Division of Batman (green) in Melbourne
- Created: 1906
- Abolished: 2019
- Namesake: John Batman
- Electors: 108,935 (2016)
- Area: 66 km^{2} (25.5 sq mi)
- Demographic: Inner metropolitan
- Coordinates: 37°44′25″S 145°0′13″E

The Division of Batman was an Australian Electoral Division in the state of Victoria. It took its name from John Batman, one of the founders of the city of Melbourne. The division was created in 1906, replacing the Division of Northern Melbourne, and was abolished in 2019 and replaced by the Division of Cooper.

The division was located in Melbourne's northern suburbs, comprising the entire City of Darebin and parts of City of Yarra and City of Whittlesea at the time of abolition. Held by Labor for all but 10 years of its history, Batman traditionally had been a safe Labor seat. However, the Greens made the seat a contest beginning with the 2010 election, where they reduced Labor from a 26.0% margin to a 7.9% margin. Though Labor increased their margin against the Greens to 10.6% in 2013, the Greens reduced Labor's margin to just 1.0% in 2016. At the 2018 Batman by-election however, Labor increased their margin to 4.4% against the Greens.

== Boundaries ==
Since 1984, federal electoral division boundaries in Australia have been determined at redistributions by a redistribution committee appointed by the Australian Electoral Commission. Redistributions occur for the boundaries of divisions in a particular state, and they occur every seven years, or sooner if a state's representation entitlement changes or when divisions of a state are malapportioned.

When the division was created in 1906, it included Fitzroy, Fitzroy North and Clifton Hill. It then expanded to include Collingwood, Carlton North and Princes Hill in 1913. In 1922, the division was massively expanded to the north-east to include the entire City of Northcote and City of Preston (which were previously in the Division of Bourke), while losing Collingwood, Carlton North, Princes Hill and part of Fitzroy. It then lost Clifton Hill, part of Fitzroy North and the remainder of Fitzroy in 1937.

In 1949, the division was massively shrunk in area size, losing its northern two thirds. These northern areas in the City of Preston and part of City of Northcote became the new Division of Darebin. It also lost its last remaining areas in Fitzroy North and no longer included any areas that it included in 1906. However, Batman was expanded into the east past the Darebin Creek to include Ivanhoe, Ivanhoe East and Eaglemont within the City of Heidelberg. The division then had minor changes in its boundaries until 1977, with gains in Clifton Hill again as well as the Heidelberg area. In 1977, it was massively expanded towards the north-east to include some of City of Preston and more of City of Heidelberg, extending up to La Trobe University and Macleod.

In 1984, the eastern half of the division (majority of which was within City of Heidelberg) became the new Division of Jagajaga, while the division regained some areas west of Plenty Road such as Reservoir. Since then, the division underwent further minor boundary changes, while still mostly based in the City of Northcote and City of Preston (both of which merged to become City of Darebin in 1994). Parts of the City of Northcote such as Alphington did not become part of the City of Darebin but became part of City of Yarra. However, these areas continued to be within the Division of Batman.

In 2003, the division became co-extensive with the City of Darebin, losing the areas of Coburg North (within City of Moreland, now Merri-bek) and Alphington. In 2010, to the south, it re-gained Alphington and part of Clifton Hill (within City of Yarra) up to the Yarra River and Eastern Freeway. To the north, it also gained parts of Thomastown or Bundoora, which were in the City of Whittlesea, up to the Metropolitan Ring Road.

The Division of Cooper replaced Batman in 2018. The new division had similar boundaries to Batman, but did not include Thomastown and Bundoora, and also included the part of Coburg North that Batman lost in 2003.

At the time of abolition, it covered an area of approximately 66 square kilometres (25 sq mi) from Thomastown/Bundoora in the north to Clifton Hill in the south, with Merri Creek providing the vast majority of the western boundary and Darebin Creek, parts of Macleod and Plenty Road in Bundoora providing the eastern boundary. The suburbs of Alphington, Clifton Hill, Fairfield, Kingsbury, Northcote, Preston, Reservoir, and Thornbury; and parts of Bundoora, Macleod, and Thomastown were in this division.

== History ==
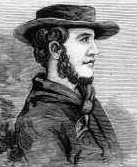
John Batman, the division's namesake

When it was created it covered the inner suburbs of Carlton and Fitzroy, but successive boundary changes moved it steadily northwards, ending with it including Northcote, Preston, Reservoir and Thornbury.

Located in Labor's traditional heartland of north Melbourne, Batman had been in Labor hands for all but two terms since 1910, and without interruption since 1969. It was held by Brian Howe from 1977 to 1996, a senior minister in the Hawke and Keating governments, and also Deputy Prime Minister 1991–95. Howe was succeeded at the 1996 election by Martin Ferguson, moving to Parliament after six years as President of the ACTU. Ferguson served as a senior Labor frontbencher, and a minister in the Rudd and Gillard governments, before resigning from the ministry in March 2013 after the failed challenge to Gillard's leadership. He was succeeded at the 2013 election by former Senator David Feeney, who had been a parliamentary secretary in the Rudd and Gillard governments.

The 2PP vote has historically been stronger for the ALP in the north of the electorate, and the Greens vote stronger in the south. The north and south of the electorate are divided by Bell Street, Preston, which has been referred to as the "hipster-proof fence" or "Quinoa curtain".

In 2018, as a result of the 2017–18 Australian parliamentary eligibility crisis, Feeney resigned and decided not to seek pre-selection to run at the ensuing by-election. The 2018 Batman by-election held on 17 March saw the election of Labor's Ged Kearney.

In June 2018, the Australian Electoral Commission announced that, at the 2019 Australian federal election, the division would be re-named Cooper, after Aboriginal community leader and activist William Cooper.

== Members ==
Image	Member	Party	Term	Notes
	Jabez Coon (1869–1935)	Protectionist	12 December 1906 – 26 May 1909	Lost seat
	Jabez Coon (1869–1935)	Liberal	26 May 1909 – 13 April 1910	Lost seat
	Henry Beard (1864–1910)	Labor	13 April 1910 – 18 December 1910	Previously held the Victorian Legislative Assembly seat of Jika Jika. Died in office
	Frank Brennan (1873–1950)	Labor	8 February 1911 – 19 December 1931	Served as minister under Scullin. Lost seat
	Samuel Dennis (1870–1945)	United Australia	19 December 1931 – 15 September 1934	Lost seat
	Frank Brennan (1873–1950)	Labor	15 September 1934 – 31 October 1949	Retired
	Alan Bird (1906–1962)	Labor	10 December 1949 – 21 July 1962	Died in office
	Sam Benson (1909–1995)	Labor	1 September 1962 – 31 August 1966	Expelled from Labor. Retired
	Sam Benson (1909–1995)	Independent	31 August 1966 – 29 September 1969	Expelled from Labor. Retired
	Horrie Garrick (1918–1982)	Labor	25 October 1969 – 10 November 1977	Lost preselection and retired
	Brian Howe (1936–)	Labor	10 December 1977 – 2 March 1996	Served as minister and Deputy Prime Minister under Hawke and Keating. Retired
	Martin Ferguson (1953–)	Labor	2 March 1996 – 5 August 2013	Served as minister under Rudd and Gillard. Retired
	David Feeney (1970–)	Labor	7 September 2013 – 1 February 2018	Previously a member of the Senate. Election results declared void due to dual citizenship. Did not contest subsequent by-election
	Ged Kearney (1963–)	Labor	17 March 2018 – 11 April 2019	Transferred to the Division of Cooper after Batman was abolished in 2019

== Election results ==
2018 Batman by-election
Party	Candidate	Votes	%	±%
Labor	Ged Kearney	36,840	43.14	+7.87
Greens	Alex Bhathal	33,725	39.49	+3.26
Conservatives	Kevin Bailey	5,471	6.41	+6.41
Animal Justice	Miranda Smith	2,528	2.96	+1.29
Rise Up Australia	Yvonne Gentle	2,217	2.60	+2.60
Independent	Teresa van Lieshout	1,245	1.46	+1.46
Liberty Alliance	Debbie Robinson	1,186	1.39	+1.39
Sustainable Australia	Mark McDonald	951	1.11	+1.11
	Adrian Whitehead	745	0.87	+0.87
People's Party	Tegan Burns	496	0.58	+0.58
Total formal votes		85,404	93.79	+1.57
Informal votes		5,650	6.21	−1.57
Turnout		91,054	81.40	−8.28
Two-candidate-preferred result
Labor	Ged Kearney	46,446	54.38	+3.35
Greens	Alex Bhathal	38,958	45.62	−3.35
Labor hold		Swing	+3.35	

Alluvial diagram of the full preference distribution
