= Alex Bhathal =

Australian politician

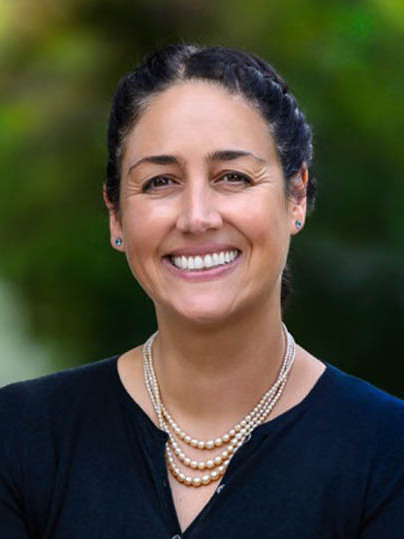
- Bhathal in 2018
- Education: RMIT University, La Trobe University, University of Melbourne
- Occupation: Social worker
- Political party: Independent (since 2019); Greens (until 2019)
- Website: https://alexbhathal.com/

Alexandra Kaur Bhathal (born 1964 or 1965) is an Australian social worker and lecturer. She is most known as a perennial candidate for the Australian Greens – standing on six occasions for the Division of Batman in 2001, 2004, 2010, 2013, 2016, and at the 2018 Batman by-election. She ran for the Senate in the 2007 election. Bhathal was also the Greens candidate for Jika Jika Province in 2002, the Electoral district of Northcote in 2006, and for the Northern Metro region at the 2010 and 2014 Victorian elections. She ran as an independent local council candidate for Darebin (West Ward) in 2024.

== Personal life ==
Bhathal's father was a Punjabi Sikh from a village near Verka Town, India.

She is a lecturer at La Trobe University in Melbourne, Australia.

== Perennial candidate ==
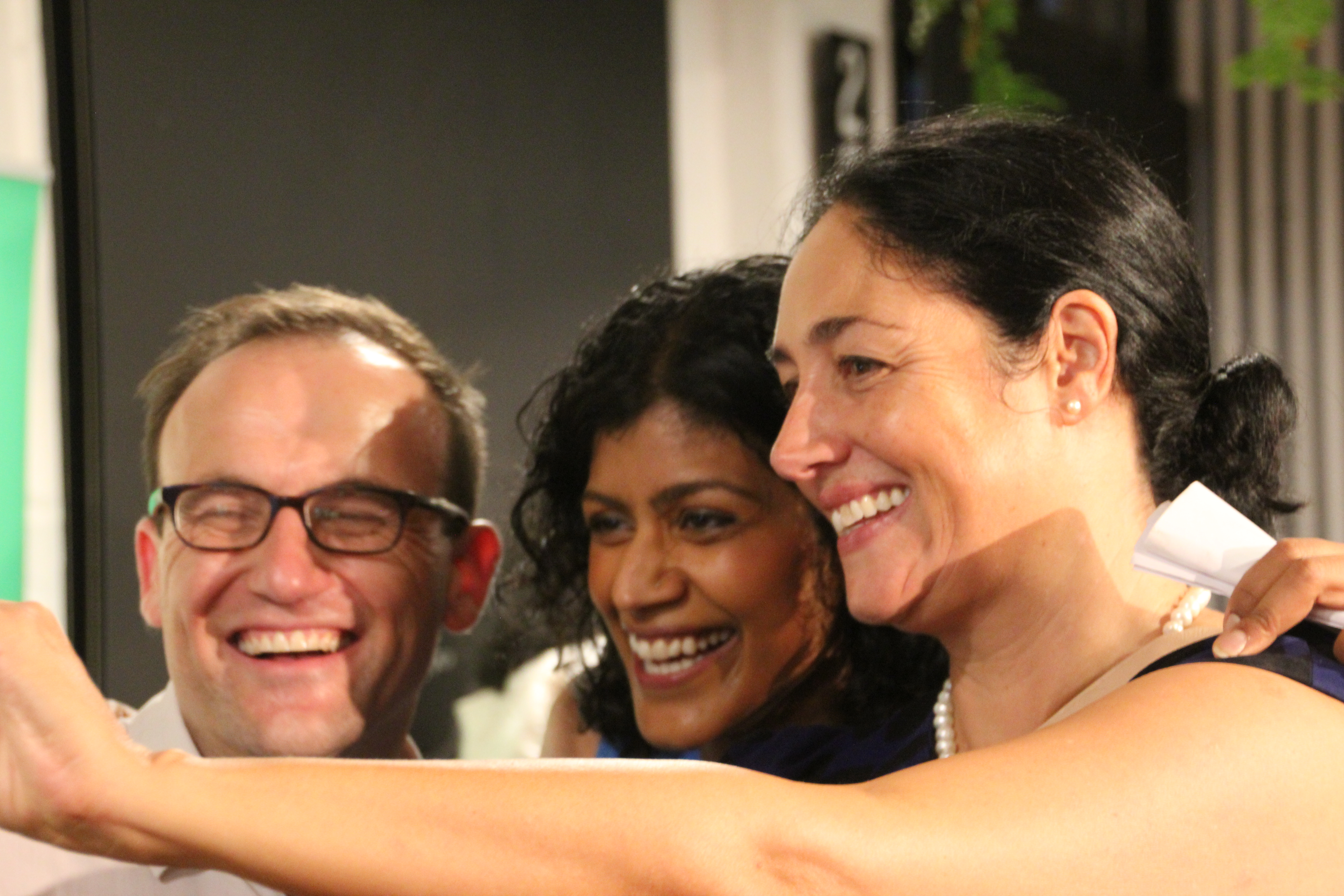
Bhathal (right) with Adam Bandt (left) and Samantha Ratnam (centre) in 2016.

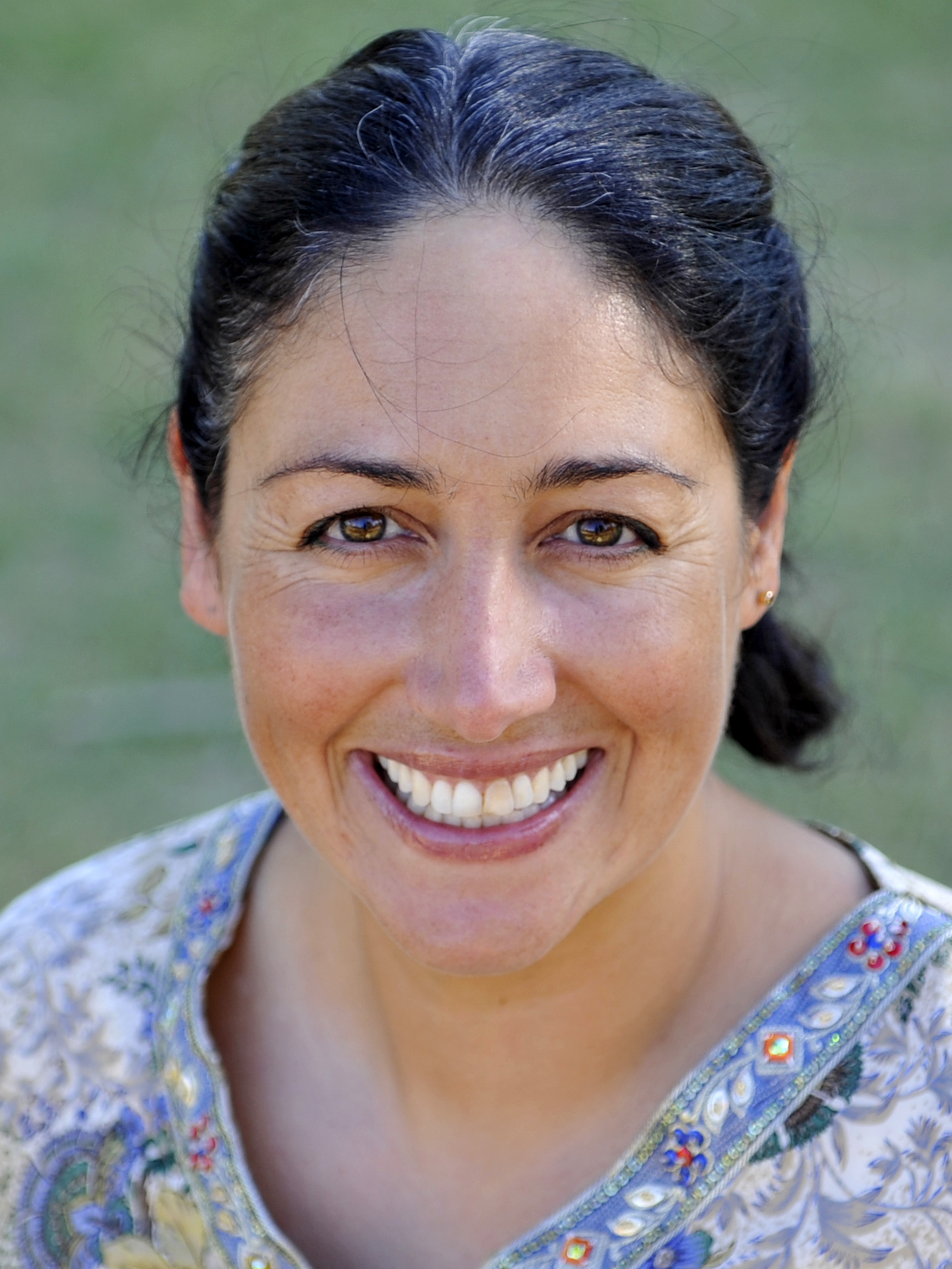
Bhathal in 2010 as Greens candidate for the Northern Metro region

Bhathal ran as the Greens candidate for Batman on six occasions; 2001, 2004, 2010, 2013, 2016, and the 2018 Batman by-election. At the 2001 Australian federal election, Bhathal received 11.58% of the first preference vote. Her primary vote grew at each subsequent election, reaching 36.23% at the 2016 federal election, higher than Labor candidate David Feeney's 35.27%.

After preferences, Feeney defeated Bhathal 51-49%.

=== 2018 Batman by-election ===
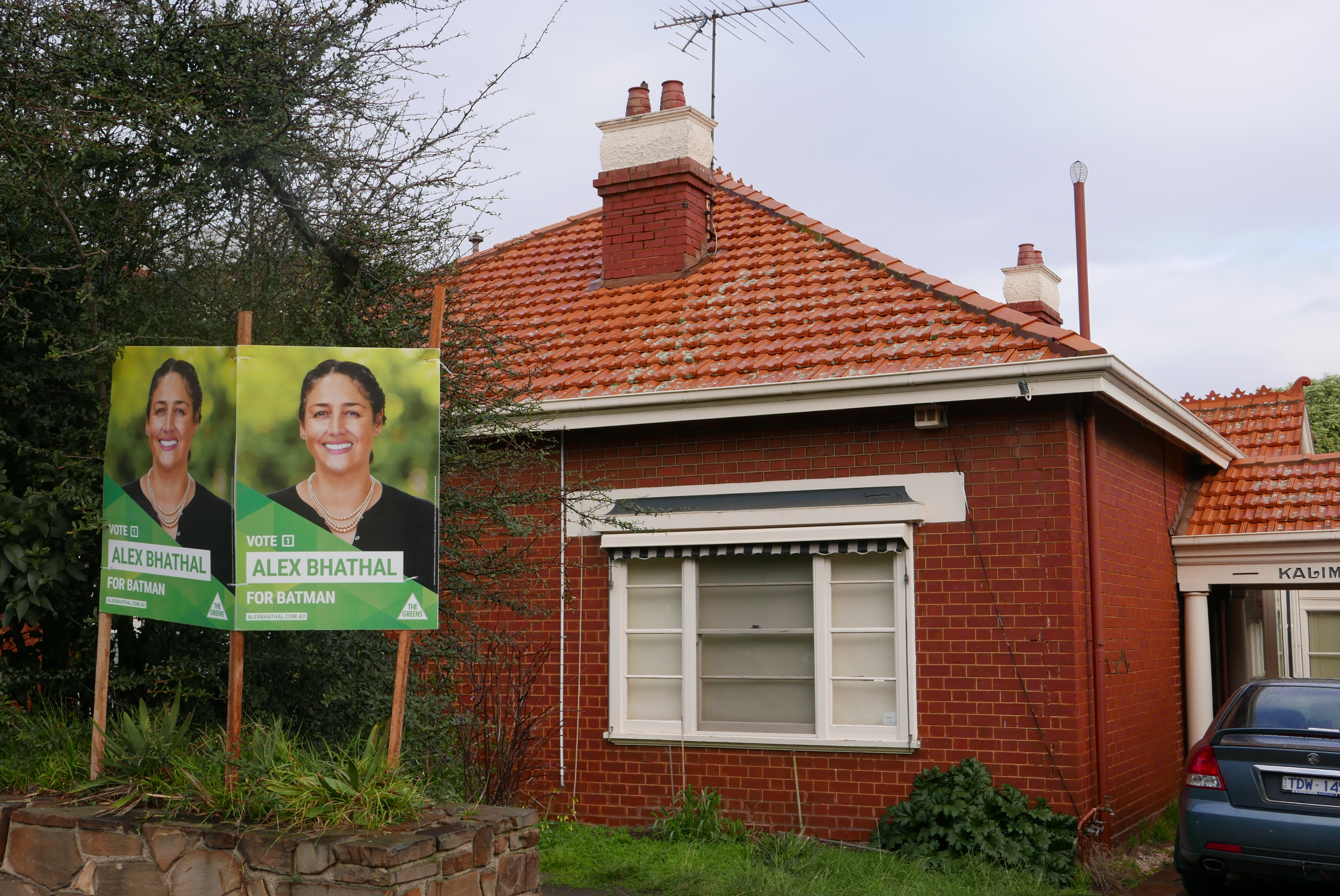
Posters for Bhathal in the front yard of a house owned by the Labor member for Batman, David Feeney. The house caused controversy during the 2016 election campaign as Feeney had not declared it in his list of MP interests.

Bhathal was selected as the Greens candidate for the 2018 Batman by-election. Bhathal's campaign was damaged when a 101-page document containing claims of bullying by Bhathal was leaked. After the by-election, an internal Greens review dismissed the allegations against Bhathal, and apologised to her.

A documentary was made about Bhathal's unsuccessful campaign in 2018, entitled The Candidate. The screening of the film in July 2019 was sabotaged, with the fire alarm being set off as soon as the film started. Bhathal was planned to be the candidate for the Division of Cooper (Note: The division of Batman was abolished prior to the 2019 election, and the division of Cooper was created, with boundaries similar to Batman's.) at the 2019 Australian federal election, but withdrew in August 2018, stating that her previous campaign had been "sabotaged" by individuals within the party. In February 2019, Bhathal resigned from the Australian Greens, stating she had been the victim of "relentless organisational bullying" over several years.

=== 2024 local government elections ===
Bhathal was a candidate for election to West Ward at the Darebin City Council election to be held on 26 October 2024. She ran against previous Darebin Mayor Sussane Newton who had been alleged to have had a role in the sabotage of Bhathal's 2018 by-election campaign. Bhathal received 13.8% of the first-preference vote and was not elected.

== See also ==
- Electoral results for the Division of Batman
