= Brian Howe (politician) =

Australian politician

The Reverend and The Honourable Brian Howe AO
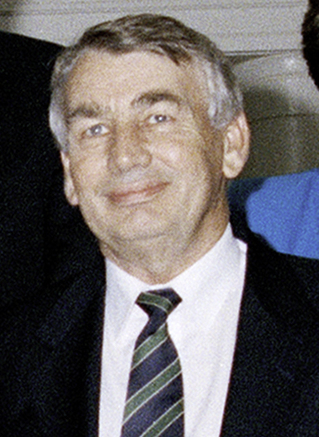
- Howe in 1994

Deputy Prime Minister of Australia
- In office 3 June 1991 – 20 June 1995
- Prime Minister: Bob Hawke; Paul Keating
- Preceded by: Paul Keating
- Succeeded by: Kim Beazley

Deputy Leader of the Labor Party
- In office 3 June 1991 – 20 June 1995
- Leader: Bob Hawke; Paul Keating
- Preceded by: Paul Keating
- Succeeded by: Kim Beazley

Minister for Regional Development
- In office 25 March 1994 – 11 March 1996
- Prime Minister: Paul Keating
- Preceded by: Peter Cook
- Succeeded by: John Sharp

Minister for Local Government
- In office 24 March 1993 – 25 March 1994
- Prime Minister: Paul Keating
- Preceded by: David Simmons
- Succeeded by: Warwick Smith

Minister for Housing
- In office 7 May 1990 – 11 March 1996
- Prime Minister: Bob Hawke; Paul Keating
- Preceded by: Peter Staples
- Succeeded by: Tanya Plibersek (2007)

Minister for Community Services
- In office 4 April 1990 – 25 March 1994
- Prime Minister: Bob Hawke; Paul Keating
- Preceded by: Neal Blewett
- Succeeded by: Carmen Lawrence

Minister for Health
- In office 4 April 1990 – 24 March 1993
- Prime Minister: Bob Hawke; Paul Keating
- Preceded by: Neal Blewett
- Succeeded by: Graham Richardson

Minister for Social Security
- In office 13 December 1984 – 4 April 1990
- Prime Minister: Bob Hawke
- Preceded by: Don Grimes
- Succeeded by: Graham Richardson

Minister for Defence Support
- In office 11 March 1983 – 13 December 1984
- Prime Minister: Bob Hawke
- Preceded by: Ian Viner

Member of the Australian Parliament for Batman
- In office 10 December 1977 – 29 January 1996
- Preceded by: Horrie Garrick
- Succeeded by: Martin Ferguson

Personal details
- Born: 28 January 1936 (age 90) Melbourne, Victoria, Australia
- Party: Labor
- Spouse: Renate Howe
- Education: University of Melbourne
- Occupation: Politician, Christian minister

Brian Leslie Howe AO (born 28 January 1936) is a retired Australian politician and Uniting Church minister. He served as the eighth deputy prime minister of Australia and the deputy leader of the Labor Party from 1991 to 1995, under Bob Hawke and Paul Keating. He was a government minister continuously from 1983 to 1996, and a member of the House of Representatives from 1977 to 1996, representing the Division of Batman in Victoria.

== Early life ==
Howe was born in Melbourne. He grew up in the suburb of Malvern and attended Melbourne High School, going on to complete a Bachelor of Arts and a diploma in criminology at the University of Melbourne. He later moved to the United States to study at McCormick Theological Seminary in Chicago. Howe was the minister at a Methodist church in Fitzroy from 1961 to 1969, while lecturing part-time in sociology. He remains an ordained Uniting Church minister. He has been a long time supporter of the Hawthorn Football Club.

In the early 1970s, Howe was the founding director of the Centre for Urban Research and Action (CURA). This model of research and action was based on his experience studying in Chicago from 1965 to 1967, and particularly his involvement in the civil rights and anti-poverty movements. CURA participated in campaigns against major changes in inner city Melbourne, including homelessness, the demolition of housing for high-rise estates, freeway construction. It supported the rights of tenants, the marginalisation of ethnic groups, and the provision of social services.

== Politics ==
Howe was elected to the House of Representatives at the 1977 federal election, representing the northern Melbourne metropolitan electoral Division of Batman. He defeated the incumbent Horrie Garrick for Labor preselection in a hard-fought preselection contest. It was reportedly the first occasion on which an incumbent Victorian Labor MP in a safe seat was defeated for preselection. A member of the Socialist Left faction of the Labor Party, Howe was Minister for Defence Support in the government of Bob Hawke from 1983. In 1984 he became Minister for Social Security and carried out various radical reforms to Australia's welfare system.

Howe appeared to face significant opposition within his electorate in 1988, when up to 60 members of the Greek Westgarth branch of the ALP defected to join the Australian Democrats. One of the defectors, tram-conductor George Gogas, contested Batman as a Democrat candidate in 1990, but polled only 12.9 per cent of the vote.

After the 1990 election Howe was appointed to the post of Minister for Community Services and Health. When Paul Keating resigned from the cabinet in 1991, Howe was elected deputy leader of the Labor Party in his place, defeating Graeme Campbell in a caucus ballot by 81 votes to 18. He was subsequently appointed Deputy Prime Minister.

As well as succeeding Keating as Deputy Prime Minister, Howe was a minister who was qualified to succeed Keating as Treasurer as Howe as a minister had been a member of the Expenditure Review Committee since 1987. However the position of Treasurer went instead to John Kerin.

Howe continued as Deputy Prime Minister when Keating became Prime Minister and Deputy Prime Minister Howe became Minister for Health, Housing and Community Services in the Keating government in December 1991, dropping the health part of the portfolio in 1993. In June 1995 he resigned as Deputy Prime Minister and was succeeded by Kim Beazley. He remained in the House of Representatives and as a minister until the 1996 election.

Howe's last months in the Deputy PM's role were marked by speculation that his successor would be, not Beazley, but Carmen Lawrence, the erstwhile Premier of Western Australia. At the time Lawrence enjoyed considerable popularity, and there were those in the ALP who hoped that with her as Deputy PM, the Keating government (then doing badly in the opinion polls) would benefit. This hope was dashed when Lawrence herself became the subject of a royal commission around the time Howe left the post, although she denied that the royal commission had been her reason for not seeking out the job. Kim Beazley was eventually elected as his successor.

== Contribution ==
Howe was an extremely active minister with a strong sense of social justice. Radical reforms were implemented in social security, disability and other areas during his term of office.

=== Social security ===
In February 1986 Howe instigated the Cass Social Security Review, which led to substantive restructuring of the social security system. Some of the most important changes were

- providing positive incentives to reducing welfare dependence, especially education and training
- guaranteed indexation of benefits to cost-of-living
- ongoing monitoring and evaluation of all programmes
- removal of gender-based eligibility for payments
- rationalisation and fortnightly payments of most benefits.

The most important new payments were:

- Family Allowance Supplement, which eventually incorporated all child-related programmes with far higher rates of payment than previously, and which incorporated Rent Allowance when applicable
- Jobsearch and Newstart, which replaced unemployment benefits and which required regular evidence of search for work.

=== Disability policy ===
Howe's tenure as Minister for Community Services from 1990 to 1994 coincided with a reorientation of disability policy to encourage disabled people to enter or remain in the formal workforce, enhancing and protecting the rights of people with disabilities and providing opportunities for them to contribute to wider society.

In 1991, Howe was the responsible minister for the Disability Reform Package. which modified Commonwealth income support payments for people with disabilities to encourage their integration into the workforce. The package contained a large shift in emphasis toward 'open employment' as opposed to the existing special employment programs. Open Employment Services subsequently offered intensive and ongoing support to secure work for disabled people in the open market.

The first Commonwealth State Disability Agreement (CSDA) in 1991 clarified the roles and responsibilities of the governments. The Commonwealth was given responsibility for income support and employment services and the States and Territories were given responsibility for accommodation and other support services. According to Lindsay (1995), the 1991 agreement provided no extra resources and merely reaffirmed the status quo; but it did set in place a permanent mechanism whereby disability policy could be advanced.

Howe also introduced the Disability Discrimination Act 1992, which made disability discrimination unlawful and promoted equal rights, equal opportunity and equal access for people with disabilities. The Act empowered a Disability Discrimination Commissioner.

In 1994 the Commonwealth Disability Strategy set in place a consultative ten-year framework of action for Commonwealth departments and agencies to remove any barriers or discrimination in employment and program delivery.

=== Health ===
In health policy, Howe established the National Mental Health Strategy, which included the 1992 mental health policy and allocated $269 million for implementation.

The Commonwealth Dental Scheme arose out of a 1992 Health Strategy background paper. It provided for free dental care for financially disadvantaged adults from 1994, but was terminated on 1 January 1997 by the Howard government.

=== Housing and urban policy ===
Howe supported an edge-city concept of locational disadvantage, where people on the edge of cities were supposed to be poorer and more disadvantaged than others with better access to services, and commissioned 17 case studies intended to demonstrate this. However the initiative was discontinued when it was shown definitively that the inner cities contained the areas of greatest disadvantage.

The main innovation by Howe in the urban sector was the Building Better Cities Programme (BBC), the first federal venture into urban development since the Whitlam government, and Australia's first submissions-based capital assistance programme. The Commonwealth government supplied $816.4 million over five years for 'demonstration' projects meeting its urban objectives. From 1991, State and local governments could submit capital projects for consideration. The Programme supported projects variously redeveloping inner city precincts, constructing and refurbishing housing, building and upgrading railways and transport interchanges, new light rail systems, new water management infrastructure, as well as developing under-used government land. The incoming Howard government in 1996 discontinued the Programme.

In 1992 Howe initiated Australia's first Housing Strategy, led by Meredith Edwards AM. The Strategy had no effect on housing policy, unlike the Staples Review that preceded it in 1988. It did recommend the establishment of an Australian Housing and Urban Research Institute, which Howe founded in 1993 and which is still operating in 2022.

== Later life ==
Following Howe's departure from parliament, he became Schultz Visiting professor at the Princeton University. He was then appointed by Melbourne University as a Professorial Fellow in the Centre for Public Policy. He taught postgraduate students, worked on several research projects, authored three books and published many articles. He organised two major international conferences in Melbourne on changing labour markets and their implications for Australian social policy. He received a visiting fellowship at the Woodrow Wilson School of Public and International Affairs at Princeton University in 1997 and 1998.

In 2012 Howe chaired the ACTU Independent Inquiry into Insecure Work in Australia. He spoke widely about the issue to the media and addressed the National Press Club.

In 2017 Howe and his wife Renata were the subject of a documentary podcast interview by the Fitzroy History Society Oral History Project covering their early years of activism in the 1960s.

He served on the board of the Brotherhood of St Laurence and the Patrons Council of the Epilepsy Foundation of Victoria. He was a founding director of the Australia and New Zealand School of Government; and was chairman of the Victorian Disability Housing Trust and the community housing association Housing Choices Australia.

== Honours ==
Howe was appointed a Member of the Order of Australia in January 2001, and promoted to Officer level (AO) in January 2008. He received an Honorary Doctorate from the University of Sydney in 2015.

== Publications ==
- Howe, B (1997). Weighing Up Australian Values: Balancing Transitions and Risks to Work Family in Modern Australia. University of New South Wales Press.
- Howe, B and Hughes, P (eds) (2003). Religion in Citizenship and National Life. ATF Press.
- Howe, B and Postma, M (eds) (2002). The Church and the Free Market: Dilemmas in Church Welfare Agencies Accepting Contracts from Government. ATF Press.

== Notes ==
Political offices
Preceded by Paul Keating	Deputy Prime Minister of Australia; 1991–1995	Succeeded by Kim Beazley
Preceded by Ian Viner	Minister for Defence Support; 1983–1984	Succeeded by Ros Kelly
Preceded by Don Grimes	Minister for Social Security; 1984–1990	Succeeded by Graham Richardson
Preceded by Neal Blewett (community services and health); Peter Staples (housing)	Minister for Community Services and Health; 1990–1991	Succeeded by Graham Richardson health
Preceded by Neal Blewett (community services and health); Peter Staples (housing)	Minister for Health, Housing and Community Services; 1991–1993	Succeeded by Graham Richardson health
Preceded by David Simmons local government	Minister for Housing, Local Government and Community Services; 1993–1994	Succeeded by Carmen Lawrence human services John Sharp regional development
Preceded by David Simmons local government	Minister for Housing and Regional Development; 1994–1996	Succeeded by Carmen Lawrence human services John Sharp regional development
Parliament of Australia
Preceded by Horrie Garrick	Member for Batman; 1977–96	Succeeded by Martin Ferguson
Party political offices
Preceded by Paul Keating	Deputy Leader of the Australian Labor Party; 1991–95	Succeeded by Kim Beazley
