= Henry Beard (politician) =

Australian politician (1864–1910)

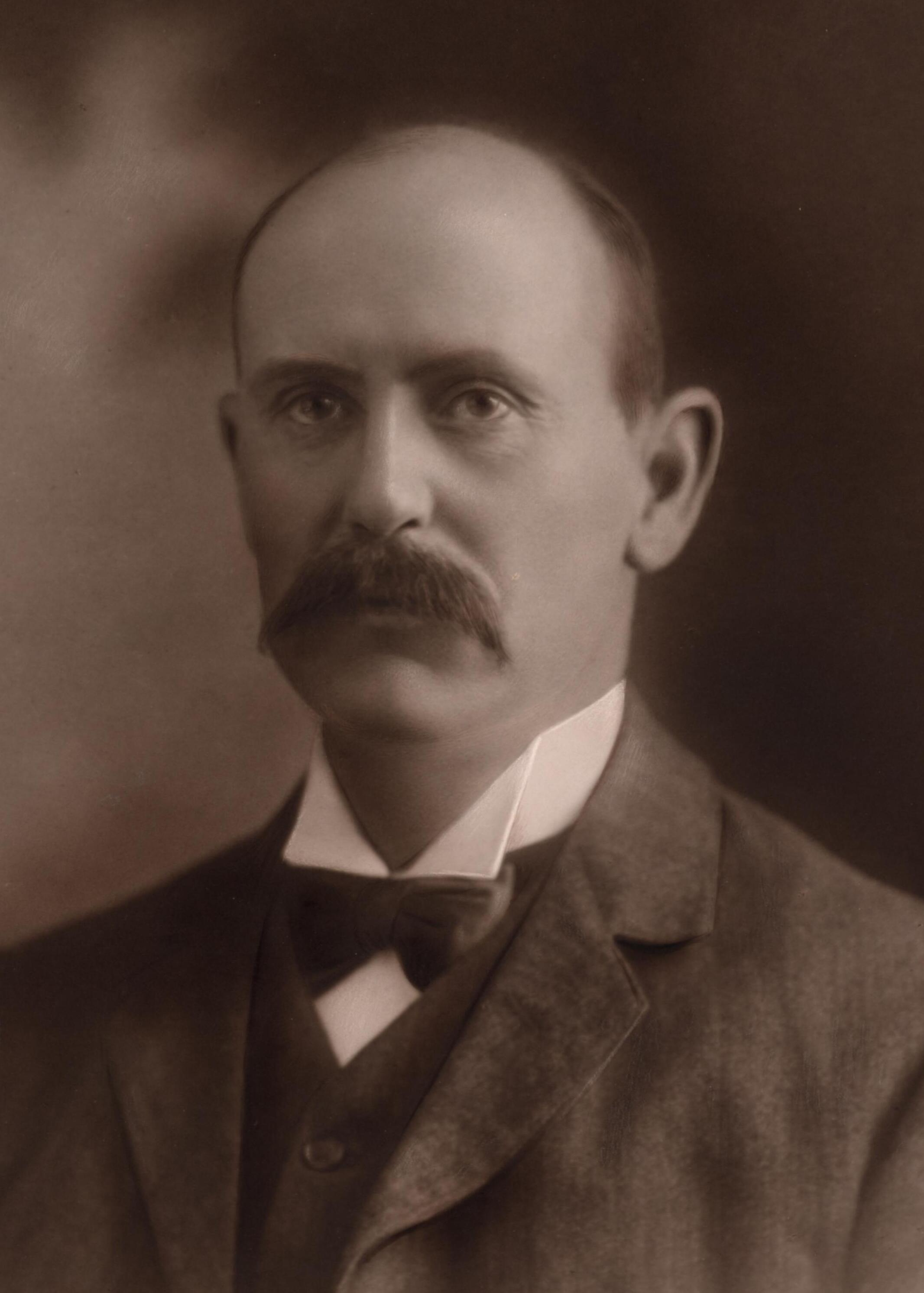

Member of the Australian Parliament for Batman
- In office 13 April 1910 – 18 December 1910
- Preceded by: Jabez Coon
- Succeeded by: Frank Brennan

Personal details
- Born: 1864
- Died: 18 December 1910 (aged 45–46) Fitzroy, Victoria, Australia
- Party: Australian Labor Party
- Occupation: Bricklayer, unionist

Henry Elisha Beard (1864 – 18 December 1910) was an Australian politician. Born in Victoria, he received a primary education before becoming a bricklayer and railway inspector, as well as a union official. In 1904 he was elected to the Victorian Legislative Assembly as the Labor member for Jika Jika, holding the seat until 1907. In 1910 he was elected to the Australian House of Representatives as the member for Batman, again representing the Labor Party.

Beard died at a private hospital in Fitzroy in December 1910 from complications of an operation. He had been in poor health for several months. His death prompted the 1911 Batman by-election.

Victorian Legislative Assembly
New district	Member for Jika Jika; 1904–1907	Succeeded by James Membrey
Australian House of Representatives
Preceded by Jabez Coon	Member for Batman; 1910	Succeeded by Frank Brennan
