= Horrie Garrick =

Australian politician (1918–1982)

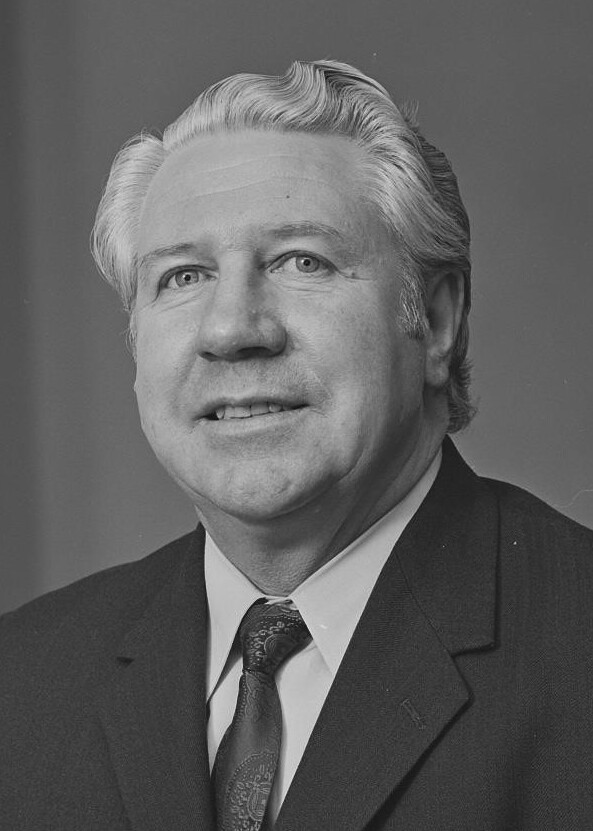
- Garrick in 1973

Member of the Australian Parliament for Batman
- In office 25 October 1969 – 10 November 1977
- Preceded by: Sam Benson
- Succeeded by: Brian Howe

Personal details
- Born: 26 August 1918 Melbourne, Victoria
- Died: 6 April 1982 (aged 63)
- Party: Australian Labor Party
- Spouse: Gertrude Shearer
- Children: Barbara, Gail, Maxine.
- Occupation: Mechanical engineer

Horace James Garrick (26 August 1918 – 6 April 1982) was an Australian politician. He was an Australian Labor Party member of the Australian House of Representatives from 1969 to 1977, representing the electorate of Batman.

Garrick was born in Melbourne and educated at Hawthorn West Central School and Swinburne Technical College. He became a professional athlete and was at one stage state quarter-mile champion, before becoming a mechanical engineering draftsman and establishing his own manufacturing business. He was elected as a City of Collingwood councillor in 1957 and was mayor from 1960 to 1961 and from 1968 to 1969. Garrick was also a commissioner of the Melbourne and Metropolitan Board of Works from 1964 to 1963.

In 1969, he was elected to the Australian House of Representatives as the Labor member for Batman, succeeding the retiring Labor turned independent MP Sam Benson. Garrick had been preselected to oppose Benson, but had a much easier path to victory when Benson opted to retire instead. In 1973, he chaired the federal government's Victorian Migrant Task Force to report on the needs of migrants. He held the seat until his retirement in 1977, having lost ALP preselection to Brian Howe during 1976. Following his preselection loss, Garrick said that he had been offered "inducements" not to contest preselection, reported to be "tens of thousands of dollars".

Later in life, Garrick resided at Bundoora. He died in 1982.

Parliament of Australia
Preceded by Sam Benson	Member for Batman; 1969–1977	Succeeded by Brian Howe
