= Samuel Dennis (Australian politician) =

Australian politician (1870–1945)

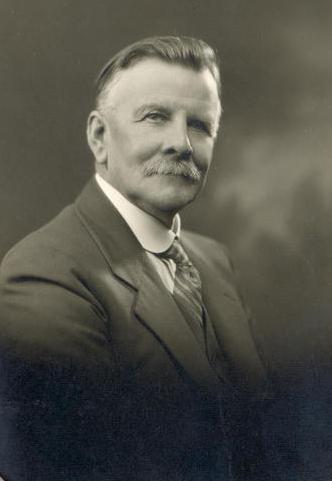

Member of the Australian Parliament for Batman
- In office 19 December 1931 – 15 September 1934
- Preceded by: Frank Brennan
- Succeeded by: Frank Brennan

Personal details
- Born: 26 March 1870 Melbourne, Victoria
- Died: 28 January 1945 (aged 74)
- Party: United Australia Party
- Occupation: Company director

Samuel Dennis (26 March 1870 – 28 January 1945) was an Australian politician.

Born in Melbourne, he was educated at state schools before becoming a contractor and company director. He served on Northcote Council for 36 years before his election to the Australian House of Representatives in 1931 as the United Australia Party member for Batman. Dennis defeated Labor member Frank Brennan on a swing of over 26 percent as part of the massive UAP victory that year. Brennan defeated Dennis in a 1934 rematch. Dennis became a businessman after leaving politics and died on 28 Februeary 1945.

Parliament of Australia
Preceded by Frank Brennan	Member for Batman; 1931 – 1934	Succeeded by Frank Brennan
