= Jabez Coon =

Australian politician

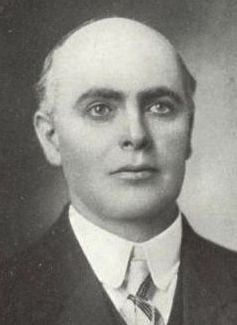

Member of the Australian Parliament for Batman
- In office 12 December 1906 – 13 April 1910
- Preceded by: New seat
- Succeeded by: Henry Beard

Personal details
- Born: 1869 Maldon, Victoria
- Died: 18 April 1935 (aged 65–66) South Yarra, Victoria
- Party: Protectionist Party
- Occupation: Goldminer, boot merchant

Jabez Coon (1869 – 18 April 1935) was an Australian politician. Born in Maldon, Victoria, he received a primary education before becoming a goldminer and then a boot merchant in Melbourne. In 1906, he was elected to the Australian House of Representatives as the Protectionist member for the new seat of Batman. He held the seat until his defeat in 1910 by a Labor candidate. He was a member of the City of Collingwood council, and mayor from 1909 to 1910. He is the father-in-law of Gilbert Chandler, member of the Victorian Legislative Council and Minister for Agriculture in the Bolte Ministry from 1955 to 1973.

On 18 April 1935, Coon collapsed and died suddenly at South Yarra whilst returning home to Boronia.

Parliament of Australia
New seat	Member for Batman; 1906–1910	Succeeded by Henry Beard
