= Frank Brennan (politician) =

Australian lawyer and politician

The Honourable Frank Brennan
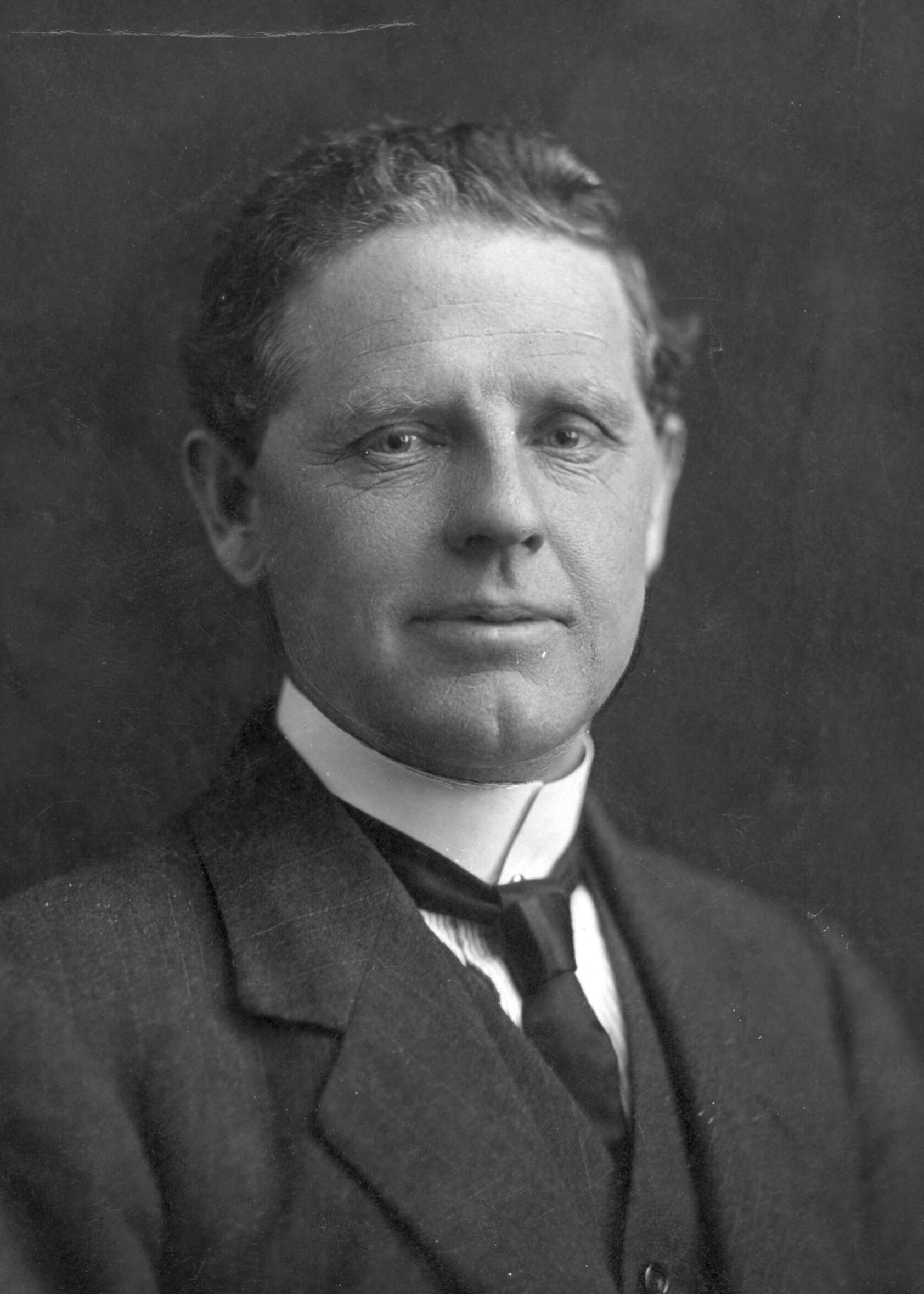

Attorney-General of Australia
- In office 22 October 1929 – 6 January 1932
- Prime Minister: James Scullin
- Preceded by: John Latham
- Succeeded by: John Latham

Member of the Australian Parliament for Batman
- In office 15 September 1934 – 31 October 1949
- Preceded by: Samuel Dennis
- Succeeded by: Alan Bird
- In office 8 February 1911 – 19 December 1931
- Preceded by: Henry Beard
- Succeeded by: Samuel Dennis

Personal details
- Born: 1873 Upper Emu Creek, Victoria, Australia
- Died: 6 November 1950 (aged 76–77) Melbourne, Victoria, Australia
- Party: Labor
- Spouse: Sheila O'Donnell (m. 1913; died 1941)
- Relations: Tom Brennan (brother); Anna Brennan (sister); Molly Brennan (niece)
- Education: University of Melbourne
- Occupation: Lawyer

Francis Brennan (1873 – 6 November 1950) was an Australian lawyer and politician. He was a member of the Australian Labor Party (ALP) and served as Attorney-General in the Scullin government (1929–1932). He was a member of the House of Representatives for over 35 years (1911–1931, 1934–1949), one of the longest periods of service. His brother Tom Brennan was a United Australia Party senator, a rare instance of family members representing opposing parties.

== Early life ==
Brennan was born in 1873 at his father's farming property at Upper Emu Creek south of Bendigo, Victoria. He was the eleventh of thirteen children born to Mary (née Maher) and Michael Brennan. His parents were Irish Catholics who immigrated to Australia during the Great Famine; his mother was born in Thurles, County Tipperary, while his father was born in Mountcharles, County Donegal.

Brennan was educated locally and went on to attend the University of Melbourne, graduating Bachelor of Laws in 1901. Three of his older siblings also completed law degrees, including Tom Brennan, who also served in federal parliament, and Anna Teresa Brennan, who was one of the first women to practise law in Victoria. Their father was active in local government, serving three terms as president of the Strathfieldsaye Shire Council.

A prominent lay figure in Melbourne Catholicism, Brennan established a legal business specialising in union cases. He joined the Labor Party in 1907 and unsuccessfully contested Bendigo in 1910, but won Batman at a by-election in 1911. In 1913 he married Cecilia Mary O'Donnell.

== Politics ==
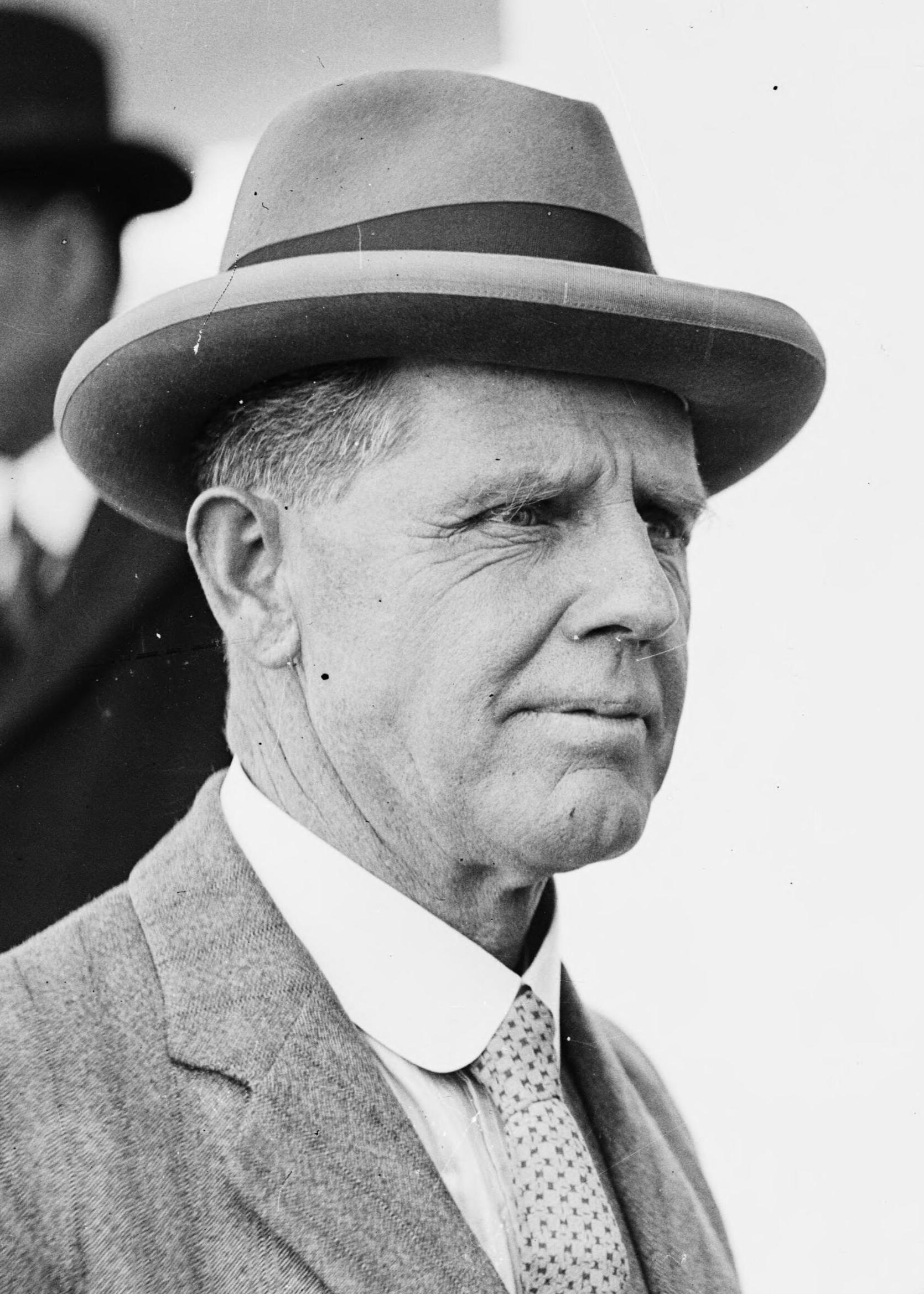
Brennan in 1929

Brennan was elected to the House of Representatives at the 1911 Batman by-election.

Following Labor's election win during 1929, Brennan became Attorney-General in the Scullin Ministry, but was not particularly effective in this role. In any event, he lost his seat in the 1931 election as a result of the swing against Labor, which came about because of the Great Depression and the resultant split in the Labor Party. Although Brennan had gone into the election holding Batman with a comfortably safe majority of 25.8 percent, he was defeated by United Australia Party challenger Samuel Dennis on an unheard-of swing (the biggest in Australian electoral history until that time) of 26.6 percent. He recovered Batman in a rematch against Dennis in the 1934 election and held it until his retirement in 1949.

== Personal life ==
In 1913, Brennan married Cecilia Mary "Sheila" O'Donnell, the daughter of Irish nationalist and Gaelic scholar Nicholas O'Donnell. The couple had two children, with their son Niall completing biographies of Archbishop Daniel Mannix and businessman John Wren. Their daughter Mary was born with Down's syndrome and "became the keystone of his life", particularly after his wife's death in 1941.

Brennan died in Melbourne on 5 November 1950. He was granted a state funeral at St Patrick's Cathedral, Melbourne, and interred at Melbourne General Cemetery.

Political offices
Preceded by John Latham	Attorney-General; 1929–1932	Succeeded by John Latham
Parliament of Australia
Preceded by Henry Beard	Member for Batman; 1911–1931	Succeeded by Samuel Dennis
Preceded by Samuel Dennis	Member for Batman; 1934–1949	Succeeded by Alan Bird
