= Division of Cooper =

Australian federal electoral division

Cooper Australian House of Representatives Division
- Interactive map of electorate boundaries from the 2025 federal election
- Created: 2019
- MP: Ged Kearney
- Party: Labor
- Namesake: William Cooper
- Electors: 119,958 (2025)
- Area: 61 km^{2} (23.6 sq mi)
- Demographic: Inner metropolitan
- Coordinates: 37°44′49″S 145°0′29″E

The Division of Cooper is an Australian electoral division in the state of Victoria. It takes in the northern suburbs of Melbourne. The division was contested for the first time at the 2019 federal election, with Ged Kearney of the Australian Labor Party (ALP) having represented the seat since its creation. She had previously represented the Division of Batman since the 2018 by-election.

== History ==
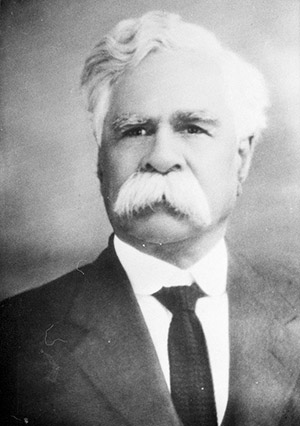
William Cooper, the division's namesake

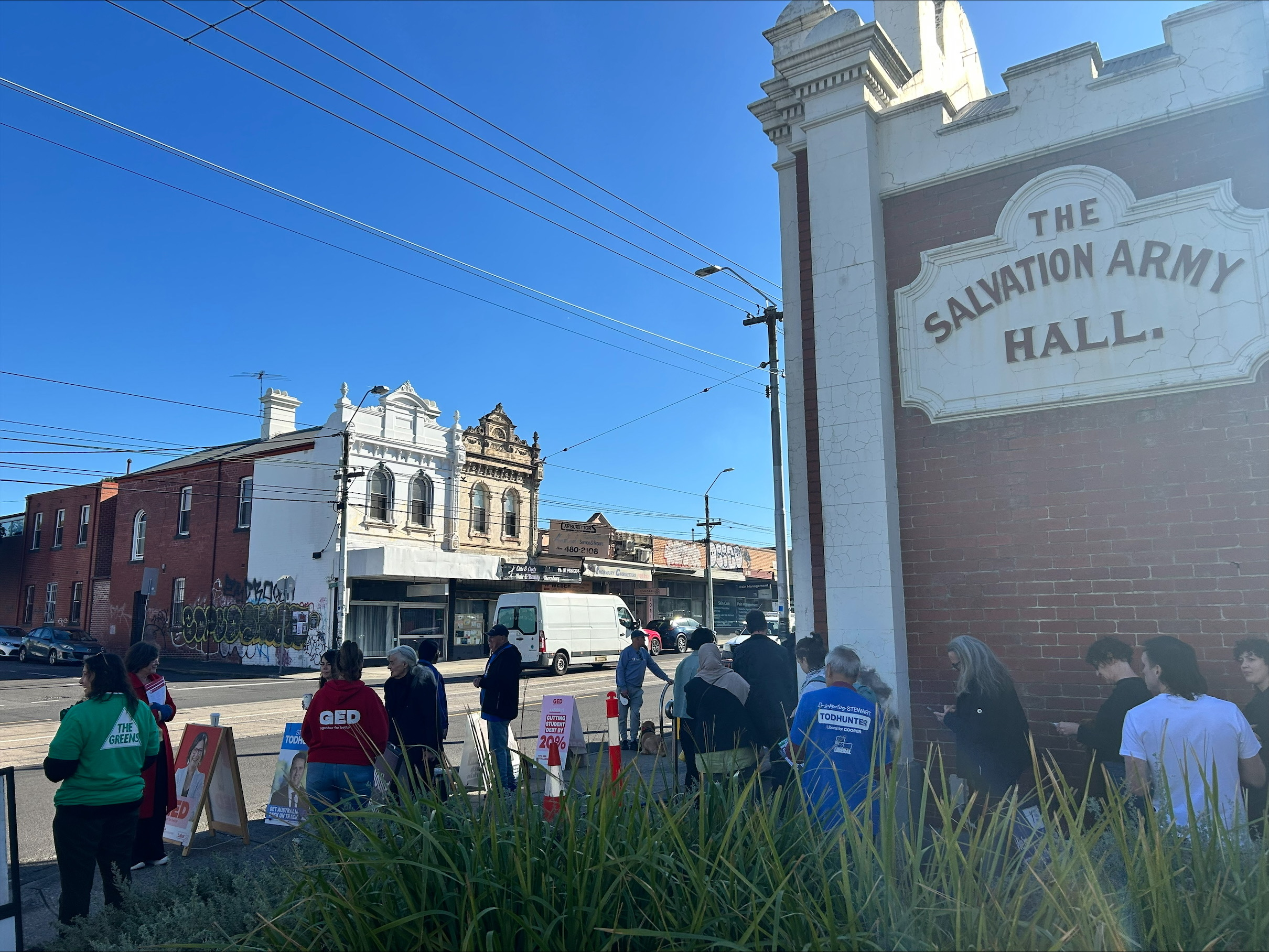
Polling place in Cooper at the 2025 federal election. The incumbent, Ged Kearney, is visible second from left.

The division is named in honour of the Aboriginal Australian political activist William Cooper (1861–1941).

The Division of Cooper was created in 2018 after the Australian Electoral Commission oversaw a mandatory redistribution of divisions in Victoria. Cooper replaced the previous Division of Batman and covered a similar area.

At the time, the seat was notionally held by the Labor Party on a 0.6% margin over the Greens, when compared to the result for Batman at the 2016 federal election. Batman had been in Labor hands for all but six years since 1910. The 2PP vote has historically been stronger for the ALP in the north of the electorate, and the Greens vote stronger in the south. The north and south of the electorate are divided by Bell Street, Preston, which has been referred to as the "hipster-proof fence" or "Quinoa curtain".

At the 2019 election incumbent Ged Kearney received a 2PP swing of over 13% versus the Greens candidate David Risstrom, making the seat once again safe for the ALP. At the 2022 federal election, Greens candidate Celeste Liddle received a 6.16 swing in her favour (2PP), for a final result of 58.67-41.33.

In 2024, another redistribution moved the entire suburb of Clifton Hill from the Division of Melbourne into the south of Cooper. This area voted 60-40 Greens-ALP at the 2022 federal election, reducing the margin of 8.7% to a notional margin of 7.8% as a result of the redistribution.

== Geography ==
Federal electoral division boundaries in Australia are determined at redistributions by a redistribution committee appointed by the Australian Electoral Commission. Redistributions occur for the boundaries of divisions in a particular state, and they occur every seven years, or sooner if a state's representation entitlement changes or when divisions of a state are malapportioned.

When the division was created in 2018, its geography mirrored almost entirely the Division of Batman, which it replaced in this redistribution. Unlike Batman, Cooper included parts of Coburg North, which had previously belonged in the neighbouring division of Wills within the Moreland local government area (now Merri-bek). However, it no longer featured parts of Thomastown or Bundoora which were in the Whittlesea local government area.

Like Batman, the southern portion of the division also crossed the Merri Creek into the City of Yarra, and included the part of Clifton Hill bounded by the creek, Hoddle Street and the Eastern Freeway. This area was lost in 2021 to the Division of Melbourne, and the division no longer crossed the creek or the City of Yarra. This was reversed in the subsequent redistribution in 2024 with a larger gain, this time gaining the entire suburb of Clifton Hill.

As of the 2024 redistribution, the Division of Cooper comprises the entire City of Darebin, with a portion of City of Merri-bek that was east of the Merri Creek and a portion of the City of Yarra north of the Yarra Bend. It is bordered by the Merri Creek to the west and Darebin Creek to the east, and shares majority of its boundaries with the City of Darebin. The division includes the suburbs of Alphington, Bundoora, Clifton Hill, Coburg, Coburg North, Fairfield, Kingsbury, Macleod, Northcote, Preston, Reservoir, and Thornbury.

Cooper includes a small part of the state electoral district of Pascoe Vale, and all of the districts of Northcote and Preston. Cooper is classified by the AEC as an Inner Metropolitan seat.

== Members ==
Image	Member	Party	Term	Notes
	Ged Kearney (1963–)	Labor	18 May 2019 – present	Previously held the Division of Batman. Incumbent

== Election results ==
2025 Australian federal election: Cooper
Party	Candidate	Votes	%	±%
Labor	Ged Kearney	45,151	41.97	+1.28
Greens	Tara Burnett	27,123	25.21	−3.20
Liberal	Stewart Todhunter	16,280	15.13	−1.09
Victorian Socialists	Kath Larkin	9,012	8.38	+4.92
One Nation	William Turner	5,684	5.28	+2.38
Legalise Cannabis	Donna Stolzenberg	4,336	4.03	+4.03
Total formal votes		107,586	97.09	+1.28
Informal votes		3,227	2.91	−1.28
Turnout		110,813	92.41	+4.57
Notional two-party-preferred count
Labor	Ged Kearney	84,489	78.53	+2.82
Liberal	Stewart Todhunter	23,097	21.47	−2.82
Two-candidate-preferred result
Labor	Ged Kearney	64,246	59.72	+0.80
Greens	Tara Burnett	43,340	40.28	−0.80
Labor hold		Swing	+0.80	
