= 1911 Batman by-election =

Australian federal by-election

- 8 February 1911

The Batman seat in the House of Representatives
- Registered: 31,729
- Turnout: 16,666 (52.5%)
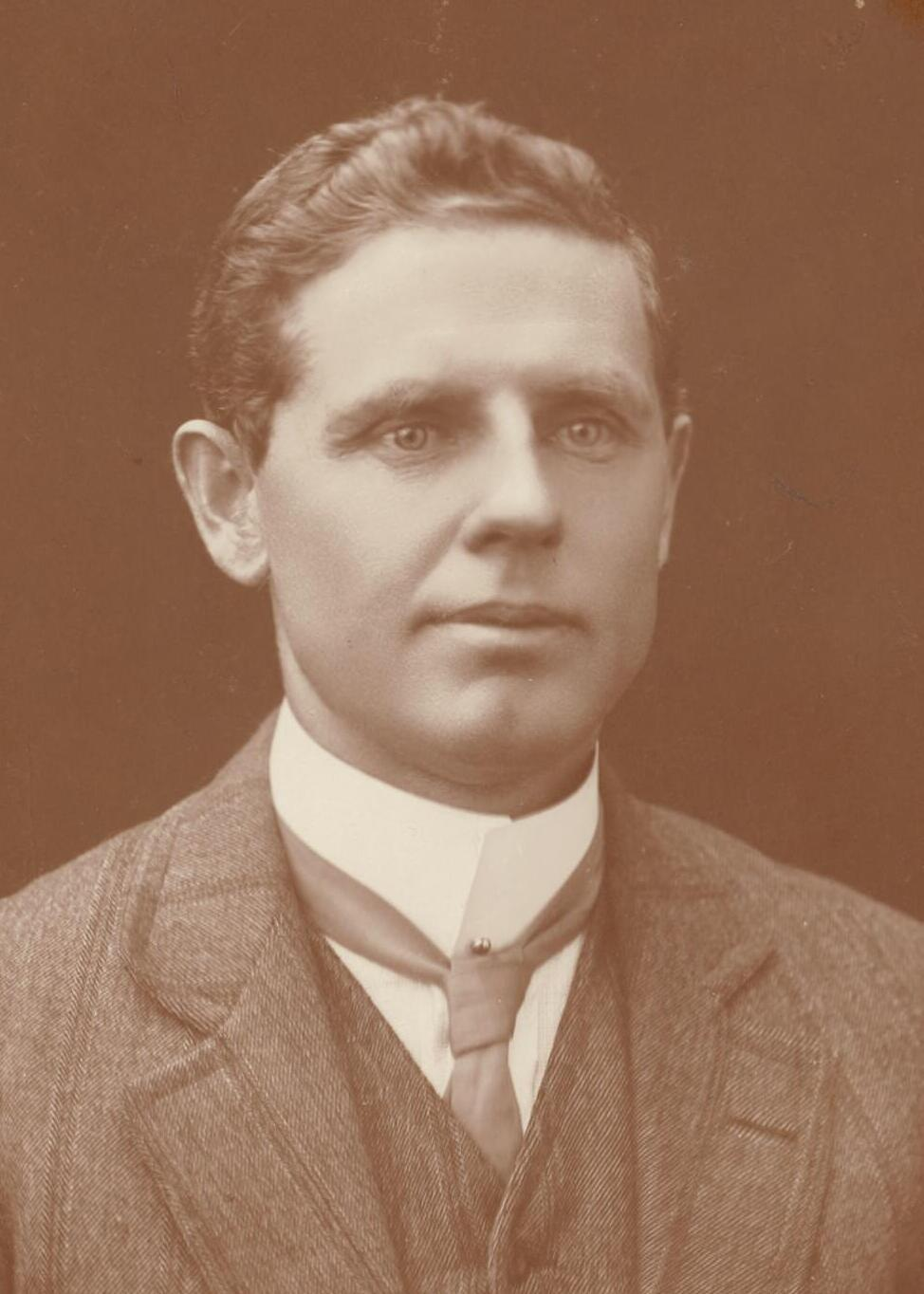

	First party	Second party
Candidate	Frank Brennan	Frederick O'Neill
Party	Labour	Liberal
Popular vote	9,385	6,932
Percentage	57.5%	42.5%
Swing	▼6.1	▲6.1
MP before election
Henry Beard
Labour
Elected MP
Frank Brennan
Labour

A by-election was held for the Australian House of Representatives seat of Batman on 8 February 1911. This was triggered by the death of Labour MP Henry Beard.

The by-election was won by Labour candidate Frank Brennan.

== Results ==
1911 Batman by-election
Party	Candidate	Votes	%	±%
Labour	Frank Brennan	9,385	57.52	−6.09
Liberal	Frederick O'Neill	6,932	42.48	+6.09
Total formal votes		16,317	97.86	−0.63
Informal votes		356	2.14	+0.63
Registered electors		31,729		
Turnout		16,673	52.55	−16.34
Labour hold		Swing	−6.09	
