= Sam Benson =

Australian politician (1909–1995)

Sam Benson CBE
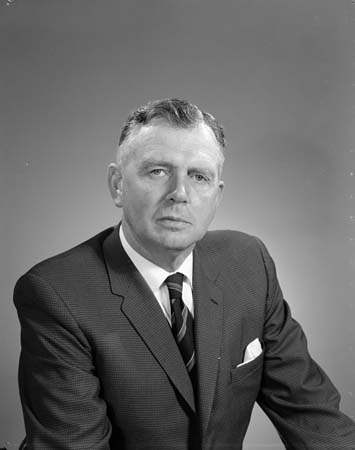

Member of the Australian Parliament for Batman
- In office 1 September 1962 – 29 September 1969
- Preceded by: Alan Bird
- Succeeded by: Horrie Garrick

Personal details
- Born: 12 July 1909 Cheltenham, South Australia
- Died: 26 July 1995 (aged 86) Melbourne, Victoria, Australia
- Party: Labor (1962–66); Independent (1966–69)
- Occupation: Sailor

Military service
- Allegiance: Australia
- Branch/service: Royal Australian Navy
- Years of service: 1939–1945
- Rank: Lieutenant commander

Samuel James Benson, CBE (12 July 1909 – 26 July 1995) was an Australian politician. Born in Adelaide, he was educated in that city at St Peter's College. He became a wool-classer, then a seaman and Port Phillip pilot, earning the rank of ship's master in 1938.

Benson joined the Royal Australian Navy during World War II, and commanded the Bathurst-class corvette HMAS Kiama.

Having served as Mayor and Councillor on Williamstown City Council, he was elected to the Australian House of Representatives in 1962 as the Labor member for Batman, filling the vacancy formed by the death of Alan Bird. Benson was re-elected in 1963, but was expelled from the ALP in August 1966. The expulsion arose from Benson's support of continued Australian participation in the Vietnam War, and, more specifically, his refusal to resign from an organisation called the Defend Australia Committee, after it had been proscribed by the Federal Executive. This organisation comprised a number of Liberal Party, Democratic Labor Party and right-wing activists, and was supported by B. A. Santamaria. Thereafter he served in parliament as an independent. He was re-elected as an independent in 1966, the first person to achieve this feat in the House of Representatives since Lewis Nott in 1949.

Benson retired in 1969, and served as the General Secretary of the Merchant Service Guild from 1970 to 1972. He died on 26 July 1995.

Parliament of Australia
Preceded by Alan Bird	Member for Batman; 1962–1969	Succeeded by Horrie Garrick
