= Alan Bird =

Australian politician (1906–1962)

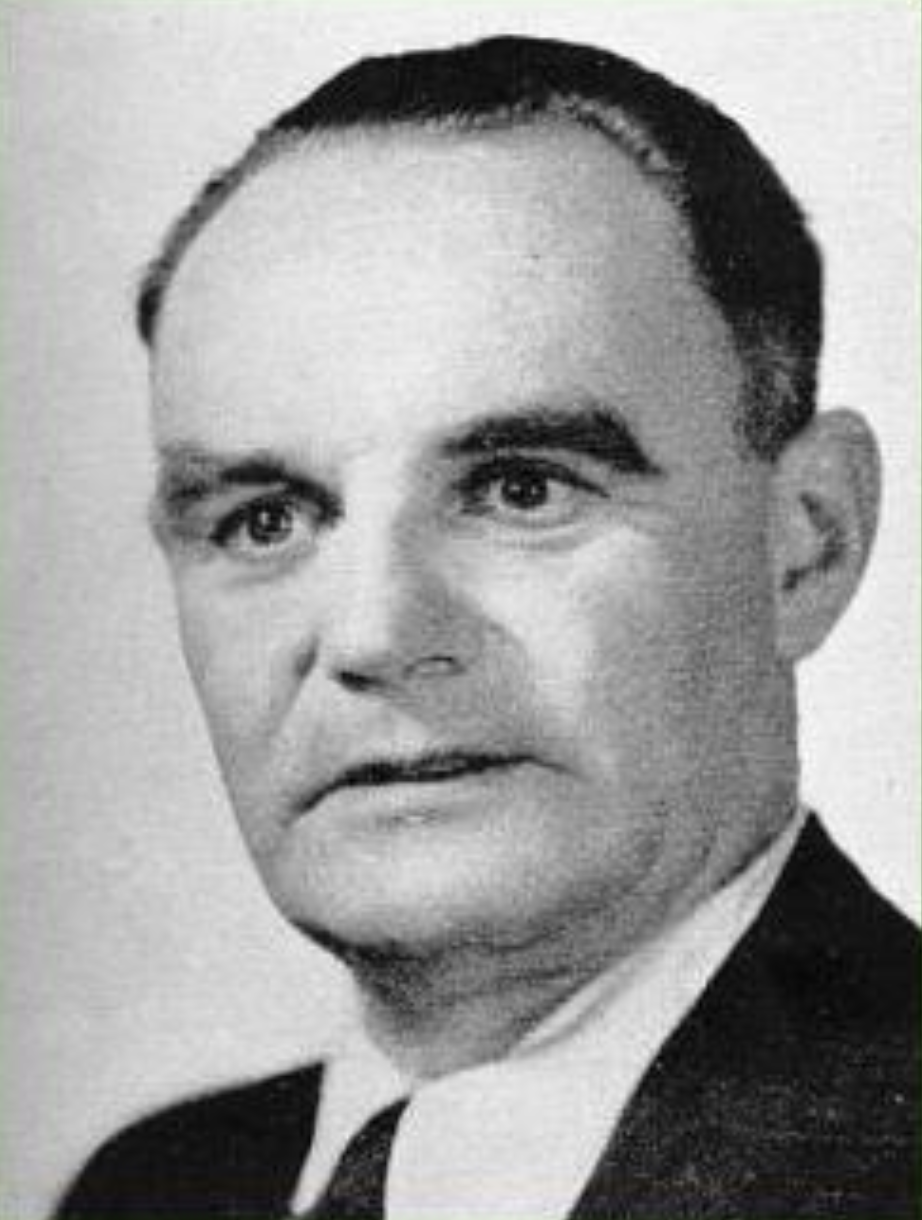

Member of the Australian Parliament for Batman
- In office 10 December 1949 – 21 July 1962
- Preceded by: Frank Brennan
- Succeeded by: Sam Benson

Personal details
- Born: 28 September 1906 Launceston, Tasmania
- Died: 21 July 1962 (aged 55)
- Party: Australian Labor Party
- Occupation: Unionist

Alan Charles Bird (28 September 1906 – 21 July 1962) was an Australian politician. Born in Launceston, Tasmania, he was educated at state primary schools in Melbourne and at Melbourne High School before becoming an engineer. As an official with the Amalgamated Engineers' Union, he was associated with the Australian Labor Party.

Bird was elected to Northcote City Council in 1930 at the age of only twenty-four and served continuously on the council for the remainder of his life. Twice (in 1940–1941, and again in 1958–1959) he served as Northcote's mayor. He was elected to the Australian House of Representatives in 1949 as the Labor member for Batman. The demands made by Bird's concurrent service on both Northcote Council and the federal parliament were certainly prejudicial to his health. He died in July 1962.

Parliament of Australia
Preceded by Frank Brennan	Member for Batman; 1949–1962	Succeeded by Sam Benson
