= Martin Ferguson (politician) =

Australian politician

The Honourable Martin Ferguson AM
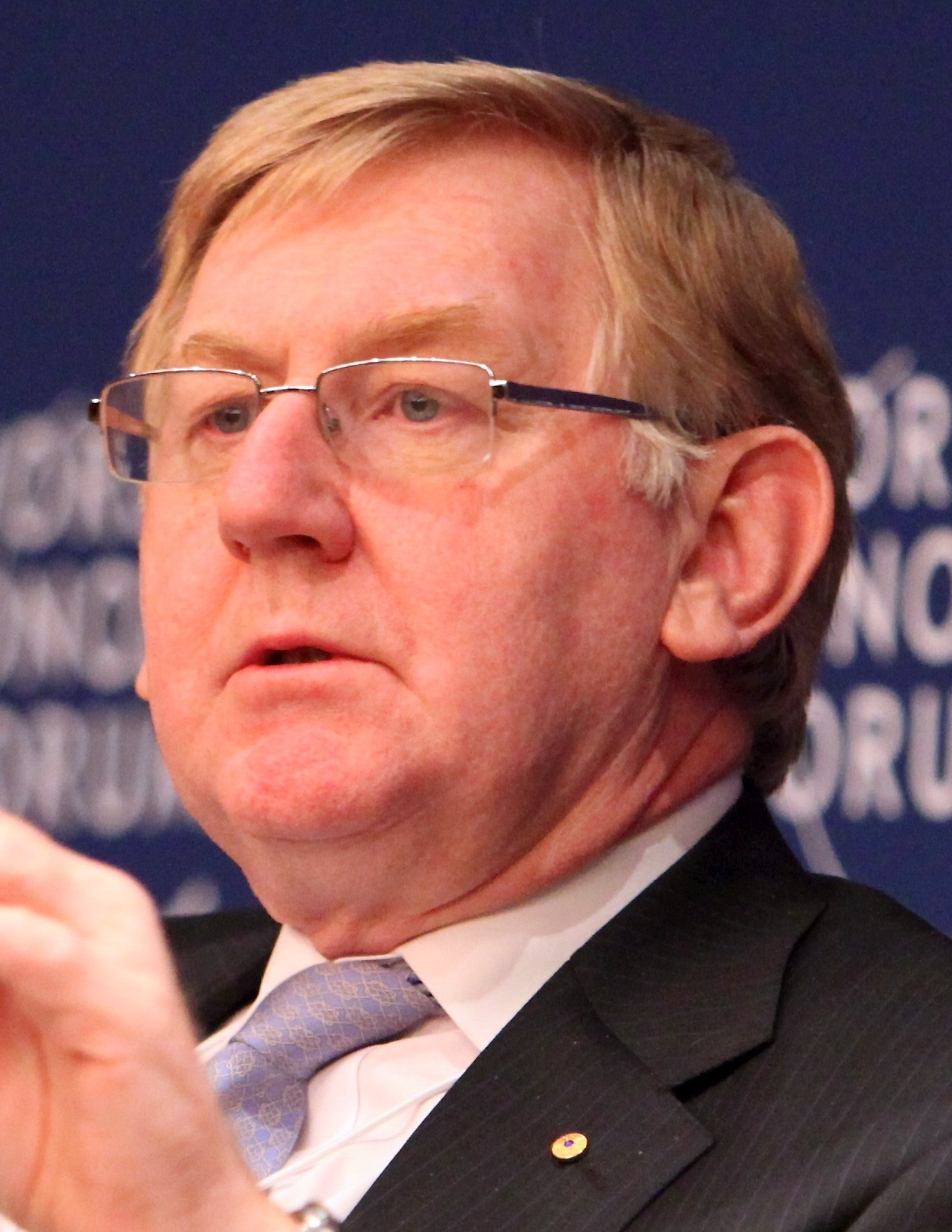
- Ferguson in 2012

Minister for Resources and Energy Minister for Tourism
- In office 3 December 2007 – 22 March 2013
- Prime Minister: Kevin Rudd; Julia Gillard
- Preceded by: Ian Macfarlane (as Minister for Industry, Tourism and Resources); Fran Bailey (as Minister for Small Business and Tourism)
- Succeeded by: Gary Gray

Member of the Australian Parliament for Batman
- In office 2 March 1996 – 5 August 2013
- Preceded by: Brian Howe
- Succeeded by: David Feeney

President of the Australian Council of Trade Unions
- In office 4 April 1990 – 2 March 1996
- Preceded by: Simon Crean
- Succeeded by: Jennie George

Personal details
- Born: Martin John Ferguson; 12 December 1953 (age 72) Sydney, New South Wales
- Party: Labor
- Website: MartinFerguson.com.au

Martin John Ferguson AM (born 12 December 1953) is an Australian former Labor Party politician who was the Member of the House of Representatives for Batman from 1996 to 2013. He served as Minister for Resources and Energy and Minister for Tourism in the Rudd and Gillard governments from 2007 to 2013.

Before entering Parliament, Ferguson spent a long career as a trade unionist, being General Secretary of the Federated Miscellaneous Workers' Union from 1984 to 1990 and President of the Australian Council of Trade Unions from 1990 to 1996. He is the son of Jack Ferguson who was Deputy Premier of New South Wales from 1976 to 1984. His brother is Laurie Ferguson, also a long-serving Labor MP.

== Trade unionist ==
Born in Sydney to Jack Ferguson and Mary Ellen, Ferguson was educated at St Patrick's College, Strathfield, and the University of Sydney. After leaving university, he became a research officer at the Federated Miscellaneous Workers' Union, eventually rising to become Assistant General Secretary, and later General Secretary in 1984, during which time he was also appointed as a member of the Australian Council of Trade Unions (ACTU) executive board.

As FMWU General Secretary, and from 1985 to 1990 as Vice President of the ACTU, Ferguson worked closely alongside the likes of Bill Kelty and Simon Crean to negotiate the Prices and Incomes Accord with the Hawke-Keating government. After Crean's election to the House of Representatives at the 1990 election, Ferguson was elected his replacement as ACTU President, and became a member of the Governing Body of the International Labour Organization. For his services to industrial relations in Australia, Ferguson was made a Member of the Order of Australia in 1996.

== Political career ==
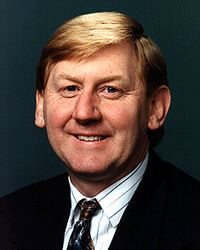
Ferguson shortly after his election to Parliament.

Ferguson won preselection for the safe Labor seat of Batman in 1995, after a deal was negotiated between the right-wing Labor Unity faction in Victoria and the ALP National Executive. At the local level, the majority Greek party membership, largely resulting from heavy branch stacking, was likely to support a candidate other than Ferguson, however no local candidate was likely to receive support from the 50 per cent vote in the preselection panel which had been elected by the Victorian ALP State Conference. The other candidates, Jenny Mikakos and Theo Theophanous, then members of competing Left factions, were forced to withdraw from a local preselection plebiscite in favour of Ferguson, as a result of these negotiations.

After his election to the House of Representatives in March 1996, new Opposition Leader Kim Beazley appointed Ferguson as Shadow Minister for Regional and Urban Development and Shadow Minister for Transport and Infrastructure. He remained in the Shadow Cabinet under the leaderships of Simon Crean, Mark Latham and Kevin Rudd. After the latter won the 2007 election, Ferguson was appointed Minister for Resources and Energy and Minister for Tourism. He continued in both roles after Julia Gillard succeeded Rudd as Prime Minister in June 2010, and resigned from both in March 2013, ahead of his retirement from Parliament that August.

=== Uranium debate ===
Ferguson is a supporter of uranium mining in Australia and in 2005, Ferguson addressed an Australian Uranium Conference and said "We as a community have to be part of the ever-complex question of how we clean up the world's climate. And part of that debate is going to be nuclear power."

The anti-nuclear movement in Australia is stronger than in other developed countries. Friends of the Earth have strongly opposed Ferguson's advocacy for expanding the export of uranium beyond the existing three-mine policy which Ferguson sought to overturn at the ALP's national conference in April 2007. The lobby group Northern Anti Nuclear Alliance has distributed 60,000 leaflets critical of his policy in his electorate of Batman. He also supported – in scientific terms – the proposal of former Prime Minister Bob Hawke for Australia to become the world's storage facility for nuclear waste although he said that it was politically not possible.

He told ABC Radio that it was wrong to ban uranium exports to the People's Republic of China: "The Labor Party adopts the view that we're open for investment. It's about economic growth and jobs in Australia. Is China to be treated any different to South Korea, Japan, France, United States? I don't think so. We don't have one rule for China in terms of overseas investment and economic growth and jobs and another rule for Japan."

==== Coal seam gas ====
In the lead up to the 2015 NSW state election, Ferguson criticised NSW Labor leader Luke Foley over his proposal to ban coal seam gas extraction.

A range of Labor figures doubled down on efforts to oust Ferguson from the party.

==== Privatisation ====
In 2015, Ferguson come out in support for the Liberal government plan to sell 49% of the government's electricity distributors. Ferguson even went further, saying he was "ashamed of the Party" and accusing Foley and the unions of "deliberately misleading the public, creating unnecessary fear and trying to scare people".

== Career after politics ==
Since leaving parliament in 2013, Ferguson has continued to advocate for Australia's tourism, energy and resources sector. As of 2019, Ferguson was the chairman of the Clare Valley Wine & Grape Association, the chairman of the advisory board of APPEA and has commercial interests in the sector as a non-executive director of Seven Group Holdings and BG Group. Since June 2015, Ferguson has also been Chair of Tourism Accommodation Australia.

In March 2020, Ferguson was appointed as a part-time Expert Panel member on the Fair Work Commission for the following five years.

On 19 May 2014, the Australian Labor Party's WA Executive endorsed a motion to expel him from the party. However he has refused to resign and continues to be a member.

== See also ==
- Ferguson Left
- First Rudd Ministry

Parliament of Australia
Preceded by Brian Howe	Member of Parliament for Batman; 1996–2013	Succeeded by David Feeney
Political offices
Preceded by Ian Macfarlane as Minister for Industry, Tourism and Resources	Minister for Resources and Energy; 2007–2013	Succeeded by Gary Gray
Preceded by Ian Macfarlane as Minister for Industry, Tourism and Resources	Minister for Tourism; 2007–2013	Succeeded by Gary Gray
Preceded by Fran Bailey as Minister for Small Business and Tourism	Minister for Tourism; 2007–2013	Succeeded by Gary Gray
Trade union offices
Preceded by Ray Gietzelt	General Secretary of the Federated Miscellaneous Workers' Union; 1984–1990	Succeeded by Jeff Lawrence
Preceded by Simon Crean	President of the Australian Council of Trade Unions; 1990–1996	Succeeded by Jennie George
