= Preston, Victoria =

Preston
- Suburb
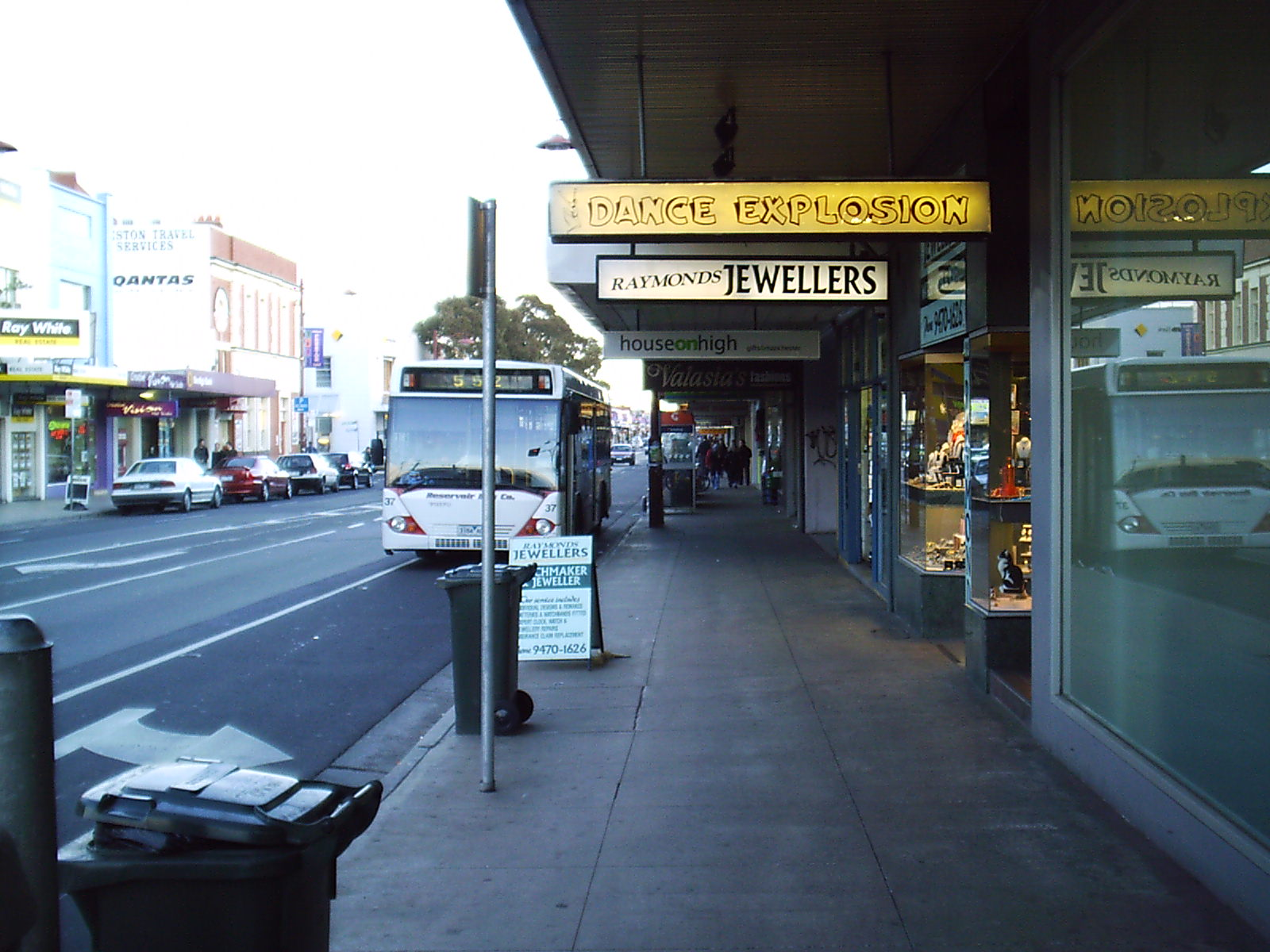
- High Street, Preston

- Interactive map of Preston
- Coordinates: 37.743°S 145.008°E
- Country: Australia
- State: Victoria
- City: Melbourne
- LGA: City of Darebin
- Location: 9 km (5.6 mi) NE of Melbourne

Government
  - State electorates: Northcote; Preston
  - Federal division: Cooper

Area
  - Total: 11.3 km^{2} (4.4 sq mi)
- Elevation: 67 m (220 ft)

Population
  - Total: 33,790 (2021 census)
  - Density: 2,990/km^{2} (7,740/sq mi)
- Postcode: 3072
Suburbs around Preston
Coburg North	Reservoir	Reservoir, Heidelberg West
Coburg	Preston	Heidelberg West
Coburg	Thornbury	Bellfield

Preston is a suburb in Melbourne, Victoria, Australia, 9 km (5.6 mi) north-east of Melbourne's central business district, located within the City of Darebin local government area. Preston recorded a population of 33,790 at the 2021 census.

== History ==
=== 19th century ===
The area was first surveyed by Robert Hoddle in 1837. Parcels of land between 300 acres (in the southern area) and over 1000 acres (in the north) were all sold during the Melbourne "land boom" sales of the late 1830s.

The first permanent white resident was Samuel Jeffrey in 1841, and from him the area's early name was Irishtown.

In 1850, Edward Wood, a settler from Sussex, England, opened a store at the corner of High Street and Wood Street, which was also the district's first post office. Meeting at Wood's store, members of the Ebenezer Church, Particular Baptist from Brighton, England met to change the name. They wanted to name the town after their former home in Sussex, but Brighton was already taken. Instead they named it after Preston, a small village nearby, where the church members had happy annual outings.

Preston Post Office opened on 1 March 1856.

The first church was accompanied by a growing number of hotels and other stores, which had emerged some 2 kilometres south of Wood's store, at the junction of Plenty Road and High Street, the latter of which served as a route to Sydney. Throughout the 1880s the area between Wood's Store and the junction would be known as "Gowerville".

In April 1939, Vara Tidd, aged 91 years, who had lived in Preston since arriving with his family as a seven-year-old, recalled the early settlement:

"He retains a wonderfully clear memory of the early days of Preston when the settlement was known as Irishtown. He can recall the camp of aborigines on the banks of the Darebin Creek and the old toll gate at Wood street Preston as well as the flour mill in the same street with Emery's pottery behind the mill. Transport in those days was primitive and limited. The waggonette left the old Royal Mall Hotel in Bourke street."

==== Preston Migrant Hostel ====
In 1952, a migrant hostel was established in east Preston to accommodate New Australians arriving under the country's post-war immigration drive. The complex was located on 21 hectares of flat land near Darebin Creek along Chifley Drive and featured uniform rows of semi-cylindrical Nissen huts. During its operation, the high-density hostel housed over 10,000 residents. This population included British migrants arriving via the Assisted Passage Migration Scheme, widely known as the Ten Pound Poms. The hostel land was sold to the Myer Emporium in 1963, leading to the demolition of the camp and the subsequent opening of the Northland Shopping Centre on the site in late 1966. One of the many families including the "POPE" family arrived from Britain, Fredrick Pope and Joan Pope with their two boys taking them 3 months to arrive by ship from south London.

==== Post-Gold Rush ====
1854 saw the establishment of the area's first primary schools, an Anglican and a Wesleyan school. The first state school opened in 1866 to the east of the junction settlement, but was later joined by another, the Tyler Street School, which had opened in 1875, north-east of Wood's store. The two denominational schools closed shortly before the Tyler Street School had opened.

During its formative years, Preston was heavily reliant on an abundance of fertile land for farming, dairying and market gardens. Areas that were not productive however, yielded clay for pottery and bricks. The 1860s saw the development of Preston's industrial capacity, with a bacon-curing factory opening in 1862, followed by a tannery in 1865. These original establishments would be followed by several larger factories, including Huttons Hams and Bacons and Zwar's Parkside Tannery.

By the 1860s, the area had a population of around 200, and five hotels, three of which survive: The Preston Hotel (1856), The Junction (1861), and the Rose Shamrock (1854) in nearby Reservoir.

A railway line reached Preston in 1889, with the Collingwood to Whittlesea line passing through. The new line provided stations at Bell Street, Regent Street, Reservoir and centrally in Preston.

Throughout the 1880s, Preston with its abundance of land and newly built rail stations was marketed as a residential area, capable of supporting 20,000 inhabitants. Between 1887 and 1891, Preston's population nearly doubled from 2,000 to 3,600. The majority of residential development took place within the corridor contained by Plenty Road and High Street, however there was also limited development in the west of the town, along Gilbert Road. These areas would remain areas of growth well into the 20th Century.

=== Urban growth ===
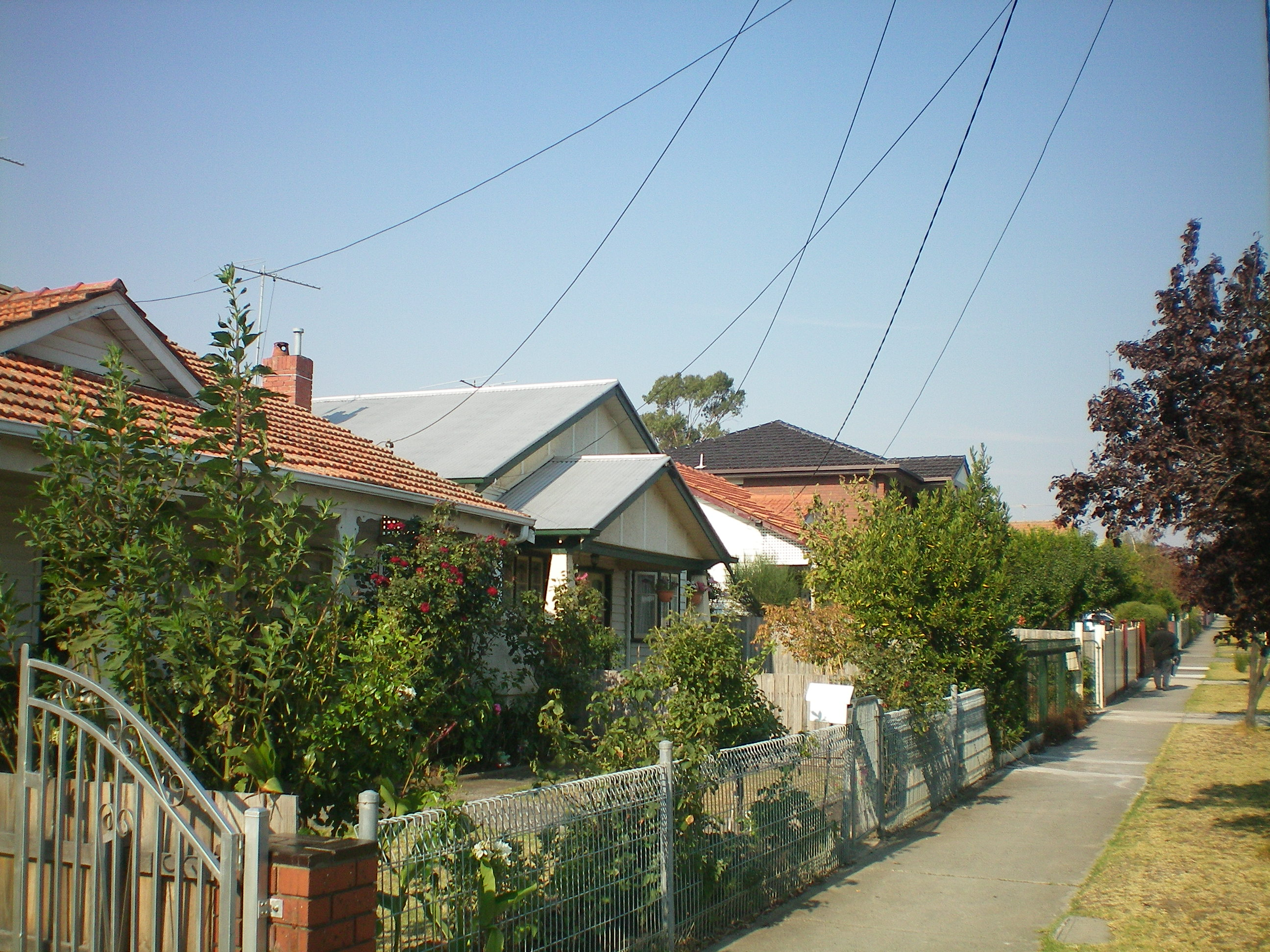
Houses along Gower Street

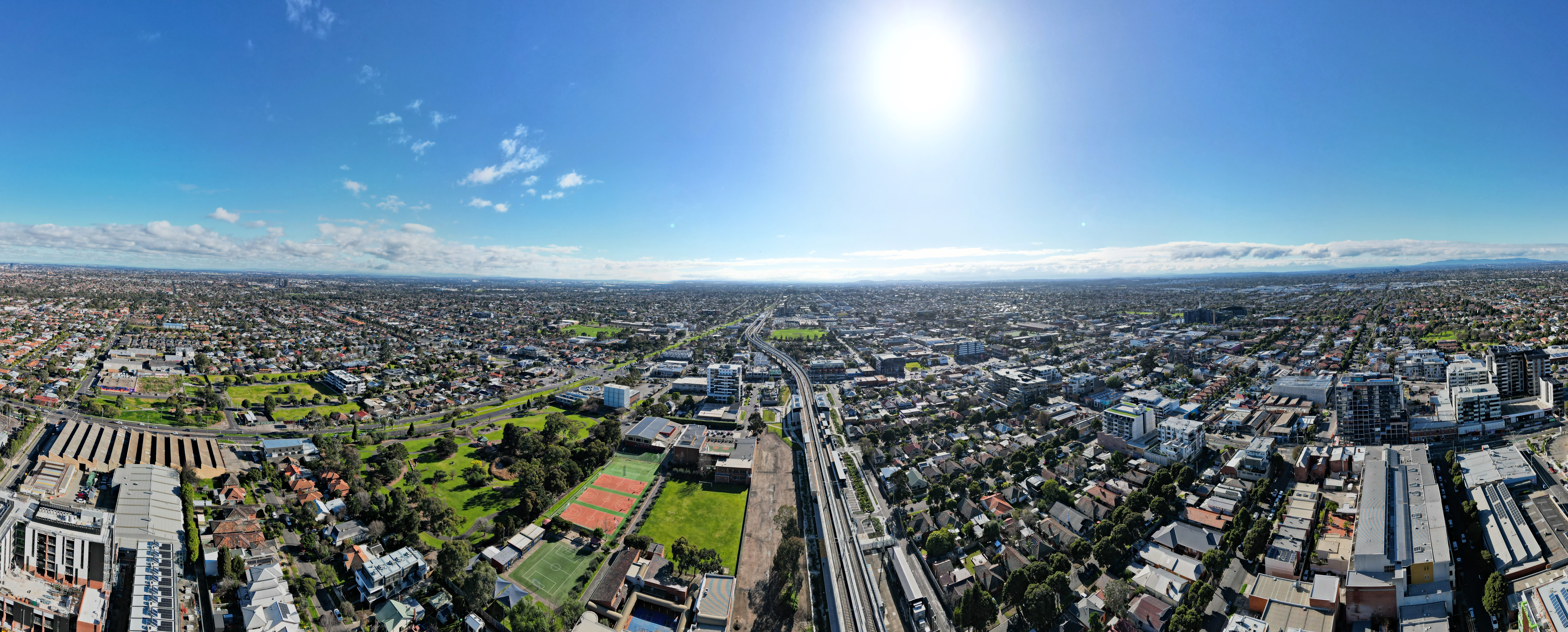
Preston aerial panorama facing north towards the Great Dividing Range, July 2023

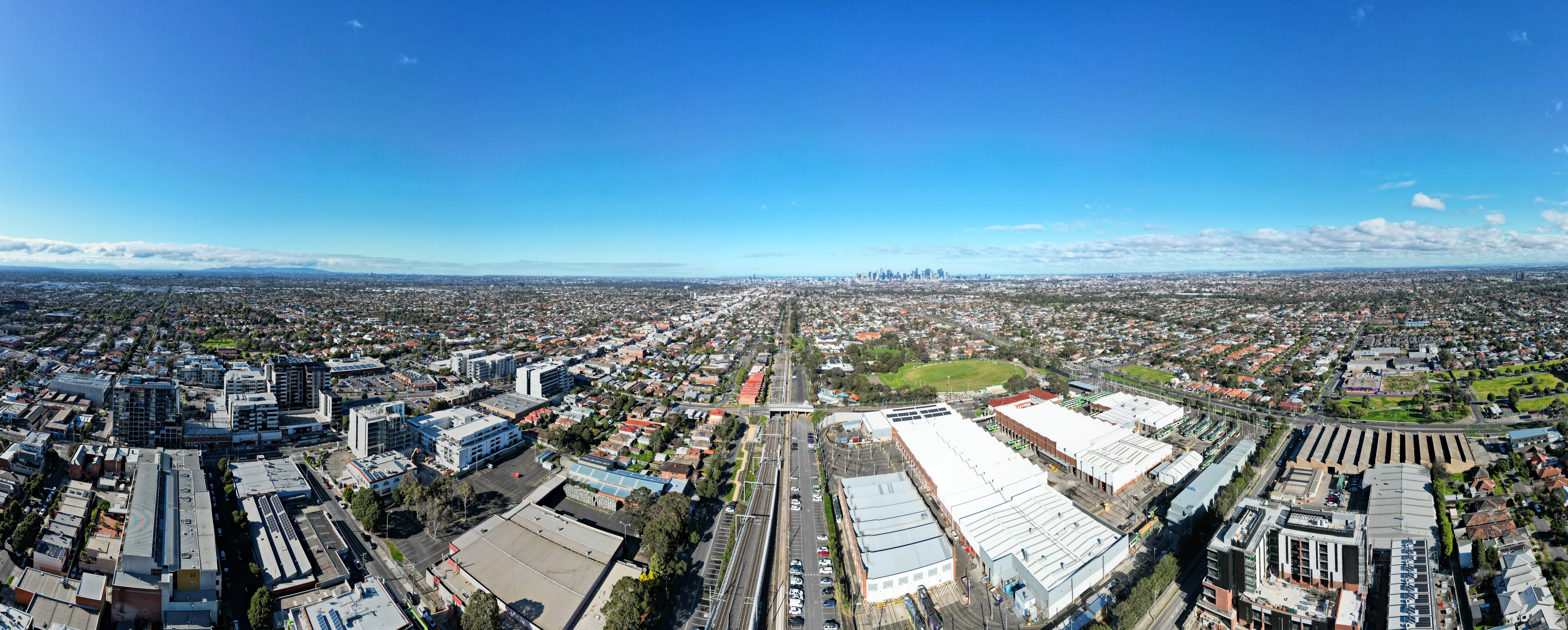
Aerial panorama of Preston facing west towards the Melbourne skyline, July 2023

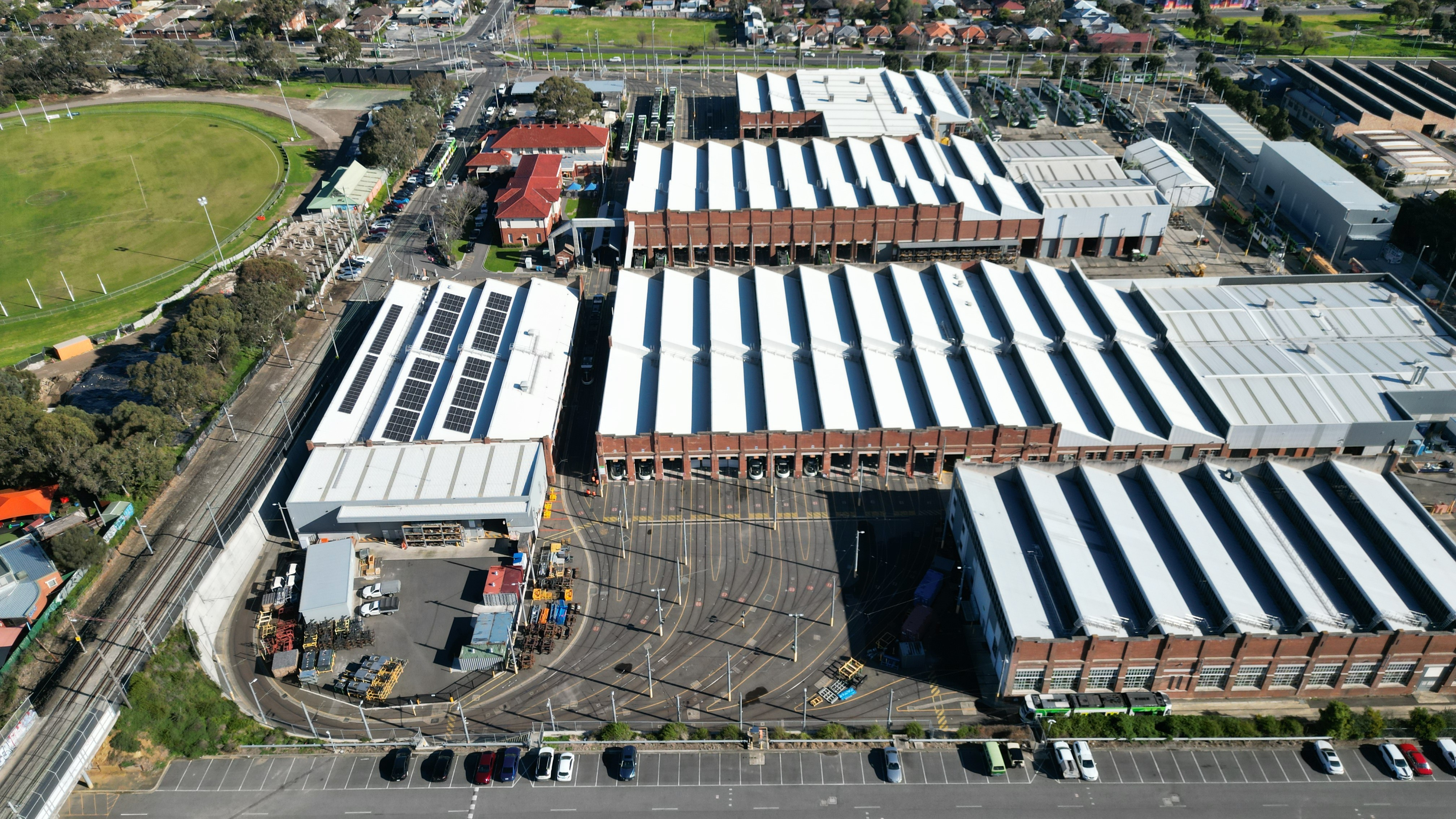
New Preston Tram Depot from above, July 2023

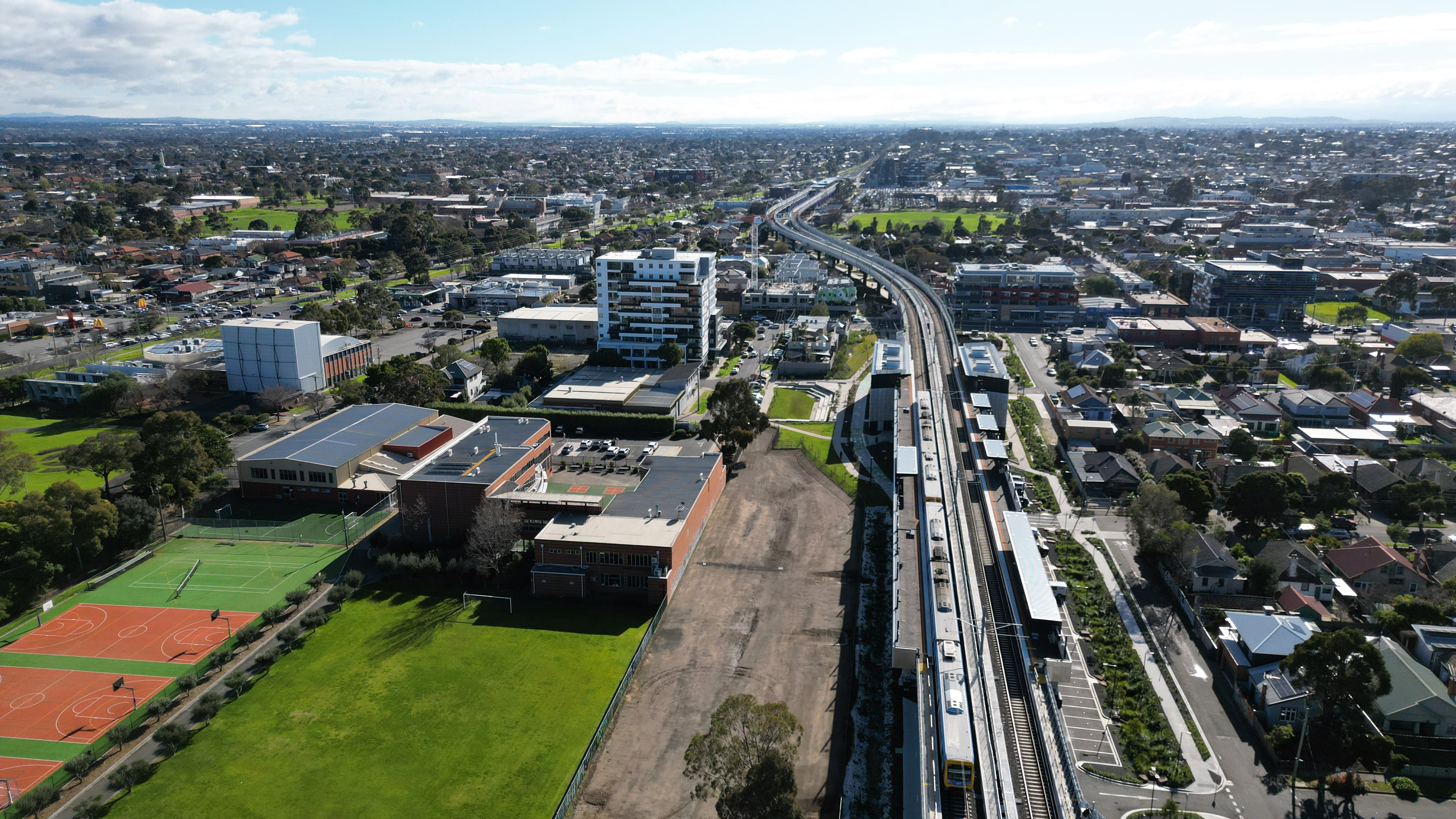
Bell Train Station, July 2023

Urban growth accelerated in Preston during the 1920s, thanks largely to the establishment of a direct rail link between Collingwood and Flinders Street in 1904 (later electrified in 1926), and a building of a tram line to the Melbourne central business district in 1920. The Preston Workshops would later be built in 1925 by the Melbourne & Metropolitan Tramways Board. The reticulation of electricity took place in 1914, with the building of Preston's sewers taking place between 1909 and 1915. 1915 also saw the establishment of the West Preston Primary School, which by 1927 had grown to accommodate more than 1,000 students. West Preston Primary School would later be joined by a primary school in Preston East in 1927, and later by a girl's high school in 1929. By 1922, Preston had been formally recognised as a Borough, two months later it had become a Town, and finally by 1926, Preston had been proclaimed a City.

With the 1930s and the Great Depression came economic hardship for Preston. However, capital works projects, which included the designation of new parks and reserves and the paving of roads, helped attract new residents to the area. Preston bucked the economic status quo by recording rapid growth between the period 1933 and 1947, with the population growing by some 40%. This growth also resulted in the establishment of a technical school in 1937, which would later become a campus of the Northern Melbourne Institute of TAFE. A notable highlight for Preston residents during the era of depression was VFL legend Roy ("Up There") Cazaly's coaching of the local football team.

Two World Wars provided Preston with two awardees of the Victoria Cross – the Empire's highest military award for valour; Bruce Kingsbury and William Ruthven, both of whom lent their name to future localities.

The post war period would also see Preston experience rapid growth. Between 1947 and 1954, the population grew by 37%, topping 64,000. A 15-year joint vision between the Preston and Northcote Councils would later culminate in 1958, with the construction of the Preston & Northcote Community Hospital (PANCH). This period also saw the construction of some 2,600 Housing Commission of Victoria dwellings which continued up to 1966, by which time said dwellings accommodated approximately 11% of Preston population.

The acquisition of former Housing Commission land by the Myer Emporium led to the opening of the Northland Shopping Centre in 1966.

Currently, the suburb of Preston exists to the south of the original Preston municipal area. Suburbs which were once part of this include: Reservoir, Ruthven, Keon Park and Kingsbury.

=== Heritage listings ===
The following places in Preston are listed on the Victorian Heritage Register:

- Maroondah Water Supply System, also located in Bundoora and Reservoir, and in the local government areas of Nillumbik, Whittlesea, and the Yarra Ranges Shire
- Preston Tramway Workshops, 16–18 Miller Street
- Yan Yean Water Supply System, also located in Thomastown, Bundoora, Reservoir, Thornbury, and Northcote, and in the local government areas of Mitchell, Whittlesea, and the City of Yarra

== Geography ==
Preston is bordered to the east by the Darebin Creek, a small tributary to the Yarra River and consists largely of flat terrain, ideal initially for farming, but later for industrial and residential development.

The original abundance of land resulted in low density urban development of Preston's former farmland, however population pressures and Preston's locality with respect to the Melbourne CBD has led to a growing tendency to medium to high-density urban redevelopment.

== Population ==
Historical population
Year	Pop.	±%
2001	26,946	—
2006	27,892	+3.5%
2011	29,925	+7.3%
2016	32,851	+9.8%

Preston's Census populations have been 623 (1861), 3,563 (1891) and 6,555 (1921). The Preston Municipality's Census populations were 5,049 (1911), 33,442 (1933), 46,775 (1947), 84,146 (1961) and 76,996 (1991).

The three postwar decades saw an influx of Macedonian immigrants into the Preston area, later followed by Asian refugees in the 1980s. By 1986, some 30% of the population was foreign born.

In Preston, 63.8% of people were born in Australia. The most common other countries of birth were China (excludes SARs and Taiwan) 3.0%, Italy 3.0%, Greece 2.8%, India 2.5% and Vietnam 2.2%.

The most common responses for religion in Preston were No Religion, so described 34.8%, Catholic 22.1%, Not stated 10.4%, Eastern Orthodox 10.1% and Islam 5.6%. In Preston, Christianity was the largest religious group reported overall (46.3%) (this figure excludes not stated responses).

In Preston, 54.0% of people only spoke English at home. Other languages spoken at home included Greek 6.7%, Italian 6.0%, Mandarin 3.9%, Arabic 3.1% and Vietnamese 2.9%.

== Governance ==
Preston is part of the City of Darebin local government area, whose offices are located at the former Preston Town Hall. Preston lay within the federal Division of Cooper which is the current seat of Ged Kearney, a member of the Australian Labor Party (ALP). The division was formerly called the Division of Batman. At the 2019 federal election, the division was renamed in honour of Aboriginal activist William Cooper. In the Legislative Assembly, the lower house of the Parliament of Victoria, the State Electoral district of Preston incorporates some of Preston (and most parts of Reservoir), and is currently represented by Nathan Lambert, of the ALP. The state Electoral district of Northcote incorporates the rest of Preston, specifically all of the suburb south of Bell Street and is currently represented by Kat Theophanous of the ALP.

== Arts and entertainment ==
As part of the City of Darebin, Preston has an artists and DIY community which has been described as contemporary, experimental, and culturally diverse. Writers, musicians, and visual artists have moved to the locality. Notable contributors to the Darebin arts community include locals Saint Jude, Downhills Home, The Contrast, The Melbourne Ukulele Kollective, Performing Older Women's Circus (POW Circus), Darebin City Brass, and members of Little John. Darebin celebrates the artistry and diversity of the community with regular festivals and events such as the Darebin Music Feast and the now-defunct High Vibes Festival. The major community Indigenous Radio Station 3KND is located in Mary Street in Preston and is Aboriginal managed.

The 2001 film Mallboy is set in Preston, specifically the Northland Shopping Centre and surrounding streets.

A Preston house viewing inspired the song "Depreston" by musician Courtney Barnett on her album Sometimes I Sit and Think, and Sometimes I Just Sit, which was recorded at Head Gap Studio in Preston.

== Sports ==
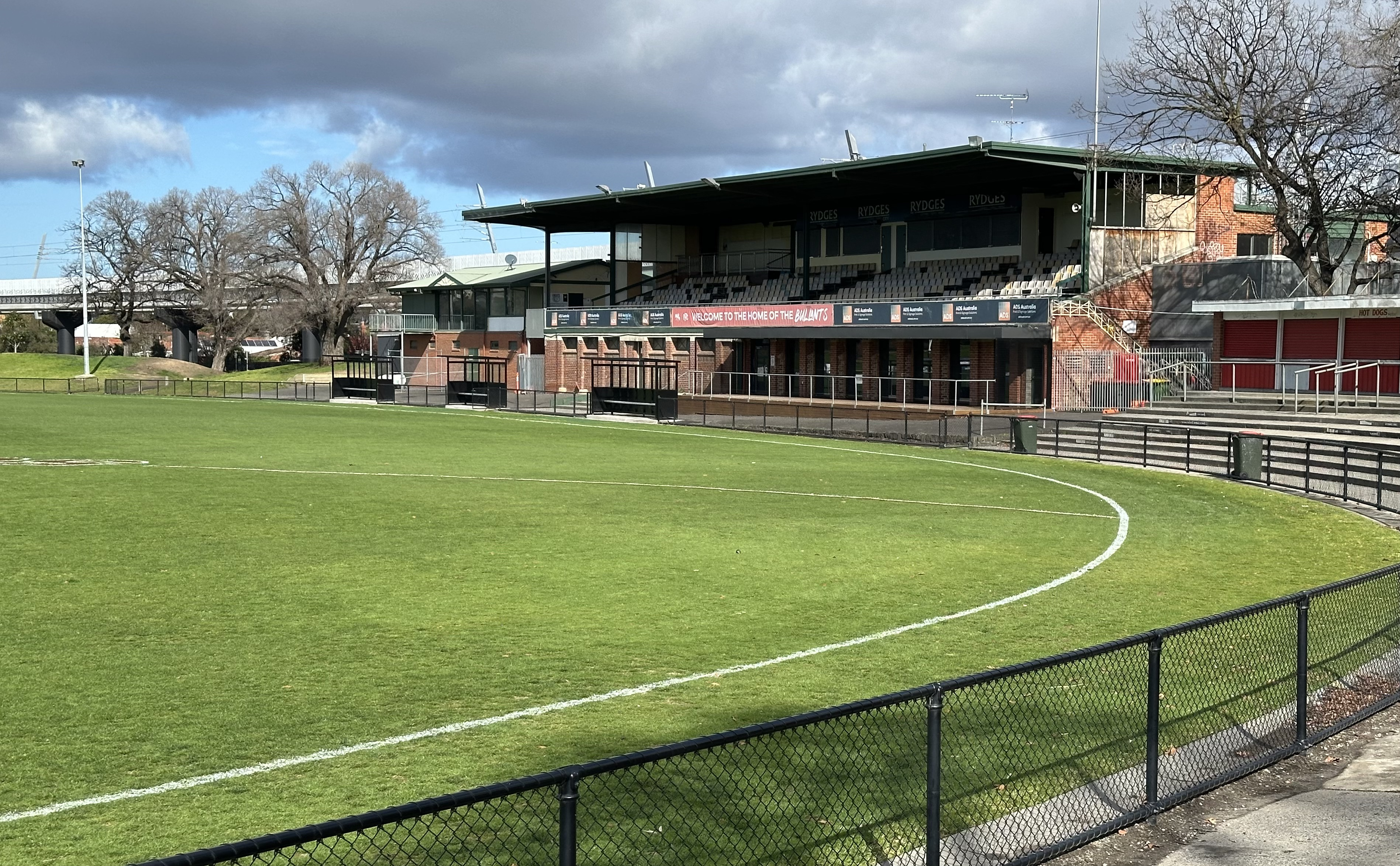
Preston City Oval, home of the Northern Bullants

Preston has been home to the Preston Football Club (later known as the Northern Blues and currently as the Northern Bullants) club since its inception in 1882. West Preston Football Club is also located in Preston. The suburb also has many junior football teams, including the Northern Knights, who play in the TAC Cup and the Preston Bullants Junior Football Club, whose home ground is the Preston City Oval. The Darebin Falcons Women's Australian rules football team play in the VWFL. The Falcons were first division premiers in 2006 and 2007.

The Preston City Oval is also home to the Preston Cricket Club, which has played their home games there since c1860. Preston has played in the Victorian Sub-District Cricket Association since joining the VSDCA in 1922. Preston's First XI last won a Premiership in Season 2002/2003.

Preston has also been home to the Preston Lions Football Club since its inception in 1947, and currently competes in the highest soccer league in Victoria, the Victorian Premier League. The Preston Lions Football Club play their home games at B. T. Connor Reserve. The club has a large successful junior base with teams from under 8's to under 18's, and also have a women's team who also compete in the highest league in the state, the Women's Premier League. In 2007, the Lions finished the season as Minor Premiers and then went on to claim the Championship in front of more than 5,500 people, as the Lions won 3–1 against the Whittlesea Zebras.

Preston Lions FC celebrate 2007 Victorian Premier League Grand Final Championship

Ruthven Reserve in East Preston has recently been upgraded, with a local sporting venue in the area.

There are few large grounds around the Northland Shopping Centre, adjacent to Wood Street. Grounds are maintained very well, and people play cricket in summer and footy during other times. Joggers are visible in all grounds.

== Schools ==
Preston is home to many schools. The government primary schools include Bell Primary, Newlands Primary - a Spanish bilingual primary school, Preston Primary, Preston North East Primary, Preston South Primary and Preston West Primary. Catholic primary schools are Sacred Heart Primary and St. Raphael's Primary. Other primary schools include St John's Greek Orthodox College and East Preston Islamic College.

High schools in Preston include two government high schools: Preston High School, a year 7 to 12 school which opened in 2019, and the Northern College for the Arts and Technology which caters for years 10 to 12 and offers the VCE and VCE-VM as well as offering post secondary courses to students seeking a specialised education in arts, trades, or technologies. Parade College, an all-boys Catholic high school in the nearby suburb of Bundoora has a satellite campus in Preston which offers the Victorian Certificate of Education - Vocational Major (VCE-VM) and admits both girls and boys. Other high schools include St John's Greek Orthodox College and East Preston Islamic College.

Preston is also home to the specialist schools: YarraMe, for primary aged students with significant social and emotional challenges, and The Pavilion school, for students aged 12 to 20 who have been disengaged or excluded from mainstream education.

The Melbourne Polytechnic Preston Campus is a tertiary provider offering TAFE (VET) and Higher Education (Degree) courses.

Newlands Primary School (No 4646), designed by Percy Everett, a former chief architect of the Public Works Department of Victoria (PWD), was built in 1951 on the border of the former Cities of Coburg and Preston to a new experimental design featuring hexagonal classrooms, and is listed on the Register of the National Estate.

== Dining ==
Preston has a wide variety of restaurants, including fine dining and fast food. High Street has been transformed lately, with many new cafes and restaurants opening and becoming popular with the youth in the area.

Niche cafés and restaurants have opened in the suburb inviting patrons to dine.

== Transport ==
Preston is serviced by tram, train and an extensive bus system.

=== Bus ===
Sixteen bus routes service Preston:

- 251 : Melbourne CBD (Queen Street) – Northland Shopping Centre. Operated by Kinetic Melbourne.
- 382 : Whittlesea – Northland Shopping Centre via South Morang station. Operated by Dysons.
- 513 : Eltham station – Glenroy station via Lower Plenty. Operated by Dysons.
- 514 : Eltham station – Glenroy station via Greensborough. Operated by Dysons.
- 517 : Northland Shopping Centre – St Helena via Viewbank and Greensborough. Operated by Dysons.
- 526 : Coburg – Reservoir via Elizabeth Street. Operated by Ventura Bus Lines.
- 527 : Gowrie station – Northland Shopping Centre via Murray Road. Operated by Ventura Bus Lines.
- 549 : Ivanhoe station – Northland Shopping Centre via Oriel Road. Operated by Ventura Bus Lines.
- 550 : Northland Shopping Centre – La Trobe University via Waterdale Road. Operated by Ventura Bus Lines.
- 552 : North East Reservoir – Northcote Plaza via High Street. Operated by Dysons.
- 553 : Preston – West Preston via Reservoir. Operated by Dysons.
- 555 : Pacific Epping – Northland Shopping Centre via Lalor, Thomastown and Reservoir. Operated by Dysons.
- 556 : Pacific Epping – Northland Shopping Centre via Keon Park station. Operated by Dysons.
- 566 : Lalor – Northland Shopping Centre via Childs Road, Plenty Road and Grimshaw Street. Operated by Dysons.
- 567 : Northcote – Regent station via Northland Shopping Centre. Operated by Dysons.
- SmartBus 903 : Altona station – Mordialloc. Operated by Kinetic Melbourne.

=== Train ===
The suburb is serviced by two railway stations: Bell and Preston, both located on the Mernda line.

=== Tram ===
Two tram routes operate though the suburb: (from West Preston to Victoria Harbour Docklands) and (From Bundoora RMIT to Waterfront City Docklands).

== Notable residents ==
- Brent Harvey – former captain of the North Melbourne Football Club in the Australian Football League.
- Peter Daicos- former AFL player
- Hanni (singer) – Vietnamese–Australian singer, member of South Korean girl group NewJeans.
- Sav Rocca – former AFL player for Collingwood and North Melbourne Football Clubs and NFL punter.
- Anthony Rocca
- Thomas Gascoyne – An English professional cyclist and dual world record holder emigrated to South Preston in the 1900s. He died whilst serving in the Australian Army at the Battle of Passchendaele.
- Ben Johnson – Australian Rules footballer for the Collingwood Football Club in the Australian Football League.
- Christos Tsiolkas – author.
- Kylie Maybury – child murder victim and resident of Gregory Grove in East Preston.
- Members of the band Blood Duster – Preston is also mentioned in their song Three Oh Seven Ohh.
- Boris Cipusev – artist
- Alexander William Sheppard – Australian soldier, bookseller, publisher and writer.
- Joe Hachem
- Patricia Fox – Australian religious Sisters of Sion.
- Jules Sheldon - Alt-country singer/songwriter born in Preston in 1992

== See also ==
- City of Preston – Preston was previously within this former local government area.

== Sources ==
- Carroll, Brian and Rule, Ian, Preston: An Illustrated History, City of Preston, 1985.
- Forster, H.W.,Preston Lands and People, F.W. Cheshire, 1968.
