= Kingsbury, Victoria =

Kingsbury
- Suburb
- Interactive map of Kingsbury
- Coordinates: 37.715°S 145.034°E
- Country: Australia
- State: Victoria
- City: Melbourne
- LGA: City of Darebin
- Location: 12 km (7.5 mi) NE of Melbourne

Government
  - State electorate: Bundoora
  - Federal division: Cooper

Area
  - Total: 1.3 km^{2} (0.50 sq mi)

Population
  - Total: 3,460 (2021 census)
  - Density: 2,660/km^{2} (6,890/sq mi)
- Postcode: 3083
Suburbs around Kingsbury
Reservoir	Bundoora	Bundoora
Reservoir	Kingsbury	Bundoora
Reservoir	Reservoir	Bundoora

Kingsbury is a suburb in Melbourne, Victoria, Australia, 12 km (7.5 mi) north-east of Melbourne's Central Business District, located within the City of Darebin local government area. Kingsbury recorded a population of 3,460 at the 2021 census.

The suburb was named after Bruce Kingsbury VC, who died in Papua New Guinea during the Second World War.

== Residential layout ==
Kingsbury is an established suburb, with the majority of homes established in the 1960s from either weatherboard or brick. During the 2010s, there has been an increased number of new housing developments in the area with Kingsbury following the trend from neighbouring suburbs Reservoir and Preston, largely due to the large block land size and close proximity to public transport and the Melbourne CBD.

The suburb of Kingsbury previously had a golf course running through it before being built over in the 1960s for new housing developments. One side of Kingsbury's street names are made up of golfing terms; Green Avenue, Eagle Avenue, Flag Street, Bunker Avenue, Club Avenue, Golf Avenue and The Fairway. The other half of Kingsbury's street names reference famous poets from across the world; Lowell Avenue, Whittier Street, Scott Grove, Bradshaw Street, and Keats Avenue.

== Public transport ==
=== Bus ===
Four bus routes service Kingsbury:

- 301 : Reservoir station – La Trobe University. Operated by Dysons.
- 382 : Whittlesea – Northland Shopping Centre via South Morang station. Operated by Dysons.
- 561 : Macleod – Pascoe Vale station via La Trobe University. Operated by Dysons.
- 566 : Lalor – Northland Shopping Centre via Childs Road, Plenty Road and Grimshaw Street. Operated by Dysons.

=== Train ===
The nearest railway station is Reservoir, on the Mernda line.

=== Tram ===
The suburb is also serviced by, which operates along Plenty Road between Waterfront City in Docklands and Bundoora RMIT, which touches Kingsbury between Stops 56–60.

== Education ==
There are currently two primary schools and a university in Kingsbury; Kingsbury Primary School, Our Lady of the Way Catholic Primary School and La Trobe University. In 2011, Kingsbury Primary School named its new building the Isurava Centre for Learning, after the field in New Guinea in which Bruce Kingsbury fell.

== Parks ==
Kingsbury has both reserve parkland and playgrounds available throughout. Kevin P Hardiman Reserve, which carries through it the Darebin Creek bike trail, has a children's playground. C.W Kirkwood reserve and Link Playground are also located in Kingsbury. Bundoora Park is also located near to Kingsbury. Bundoora Park is a 180 hectare parkland set in natural bushland beside the Darebin Creek. The public parklands at Bundoora Park provides a number of playgrounds, waterways and free BBQ facilities.

== Demographics ==
The most common ancestries in Kingsbury were Australian 16.5%, English 13.3%, Chinese 12.5%, Italian 8.1% and Vietnamese 5.8%. 46.3% of people were born in Australia. The most common countries of birth were China (excludes SARs and Taiwan) 11.5%, Vietnam 6.2%, India 4.6%, Italy 4.3% and Malaysia 2.5%.

== Religion ==
According to the 2006 census, the majority of Kingsbury's population are Catholics. Our Lady of the Way Catholic Church is the local Catholic centre. For other religions, the nearest Buddhist Temple is Linh Son Buddhist Temple located on Radford Road, Reservoir and the Mosque located in nearby Preston.

== Projects ==
There is currently a bronze statue of Bruce Kingsbury located at the Kingsbury Bowls club. The statue is one of three in existence.

== Sport and leisure ==
Kingsbury has a wide range of sporting facilities within the area and nearby. It holds two football/cricket grounds, one of which is home to the Camera Cricket Club on Dunne Street, a tennis club with four courts, basketball facilities, which is home to the 'Kingsbury Comets', a lawn bowls club and boxing gym, which is home to Brizzy Brothers boxing, which has operated in Kingsbury since 1989. Within close proximity is the Reservoir Leisure Centre, the Reservoir Community Sports Centre, which includes basketball, netball and hockey, La Trobe University Sports Centre and several other multi-purpose sporting grounds. The Kingsbury community market has been running for over 30 years every Sunday from Kingsbury Drive at La Trobe University. The market is popular for selling plants, produce, handcrafts, bric-a-brac and much more.

== See also ==
- City of Preston – Kingsbury was previously within this former local government area.
