= Reservoir, Victoria =

Reservoir
- Suburb
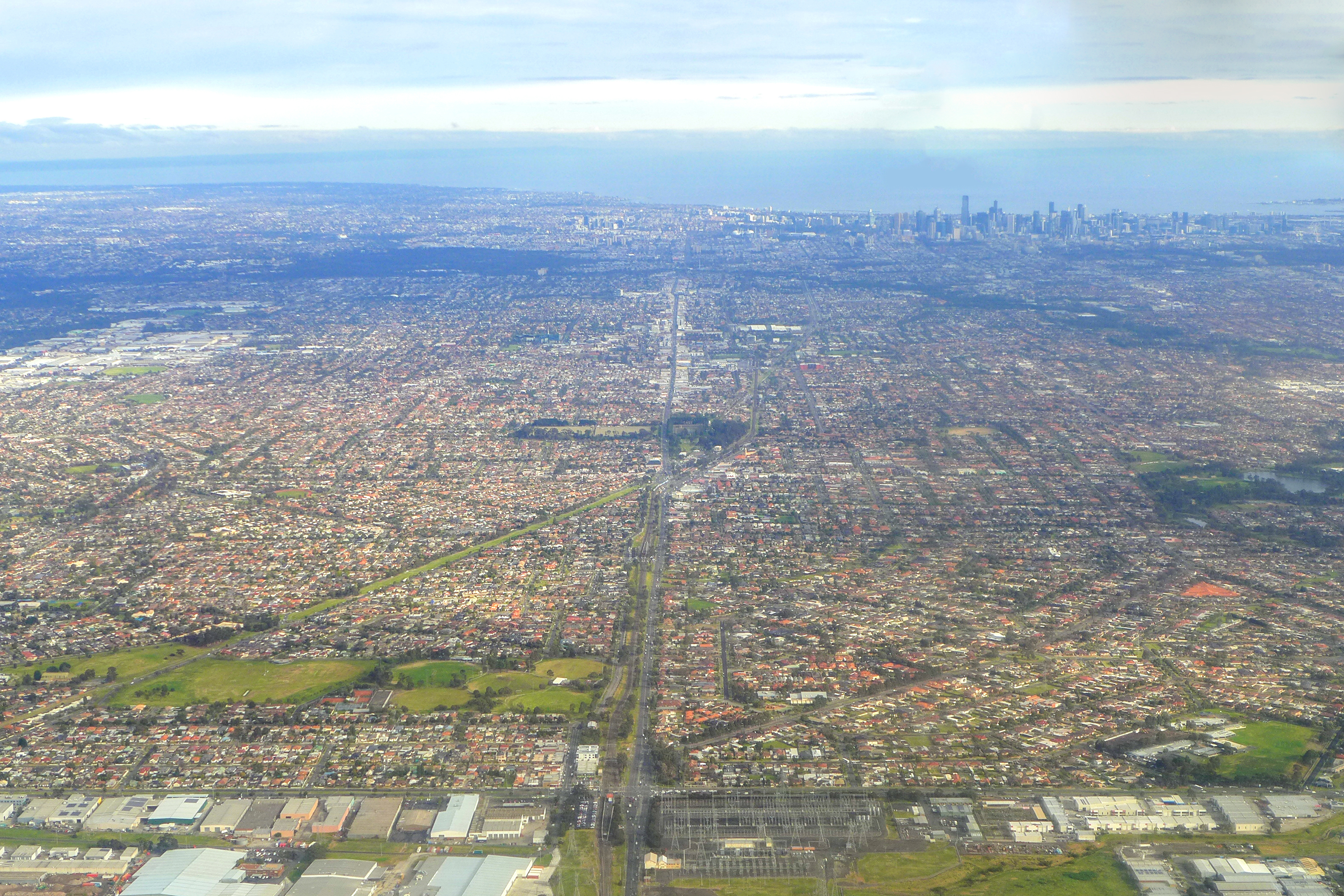
- Aerial view of Reservoir in August 2017

- Interactive map of Reservoir
- Coordinates: 37.713°S 145.012°E
- Country: Australia
- State: Victoria
- City: Melbourne
- LGA: City of Darebin
- Location: 11 km (6.8 mi) N of Melbourne

Government
  - State electorates: Preston; Thomastown
  - Federal division: Cooper

Area
  - Total: 19.1 km^{2} (7.4 sq mi)
- Elevation: 97 m (318 ft)

Population
  - Total: 51,096 (2021 census)
  - Density: 2,675/km^{2} (6,929/sq mi)
- Postcode: 3073
Suburbs around Reservoir
Campbellfield; Thomastown	Thomastown	Bundoora
Fawkner	Reservoir	Kingsbury
Coburg North	Preston	Heidelberg West

Reservoir (/ˈrɛzəv(w)ɔː/ REZ-ə-v(w)aw) is a suburb in Melbourne, Victoria, Australia, 12 km (7.5 mi) north of Melbourne's Central Business District, located within the City of Darebin local government area. Reservoir recorded a population of 51,096 at the 2021 census.

Reservoir is an established suburb with standard brick or weatherboard homes, and an increasing number of new developments. The suburb contains recreation areas and facilities, including Edwardes Lake Park and the Reservoir Leisure Centre, and is home to the Edwardes Street and Broadway shopping strips.

== History ==
The land which became the suburb of Reservoir was first surveyed by Robert Hoddle in 1837, and was formed from parts of both the Jika Jika Parish and Keelbundoora Parish.

The Rose Shamrock Hotel, formerly known as The Rose Shamrock & Thistle Hotel, opened on Plenty Road in 1854. Reservoir post office opened around 1921. Reservoir became a suburb at that time, with the name coming from the three water reservoirs first built in 1863.

The reservoirs were collectively known as Preston Reservoir, which continue to form part of the fresh water supplied to Melbourne's inner and western suburbs. The Maroondah Aqueduct was built in 1886–1891, to supply water to the Preston Reservoir from a diversion weir on the Watts River, which was dammed in 1927 to form Maroondah Reservoir.

In 1914, Thomas Dyer Edwardes donated an area of 34 acres (14 hectares) of land to the people of the City of Preston, which was developed into Edwardes Lake Park. Between 1919 and 1939, swimming was officially permitted in the lake, overseen by the Preston Lifesaving Club, and regular demonstrations of swimming and lifesaving techniques were given.

=== Heritage listings ===
The following places in Reservoir are listed on the Victorian Heritage Register:

- Maroondah Water Supply System, also located in Bundoora and Preston, and in the local government areas of Nillumbik, Whittlesea, and the Yarra Ranges Shire
- Yan Yean Water Supply System, also located in Thomastown, Bundoora, Preston, Thornbury, and Northcote, and in the local government areas of Mitchell, Whittlesea, and the City of Yarra

== Overview ==
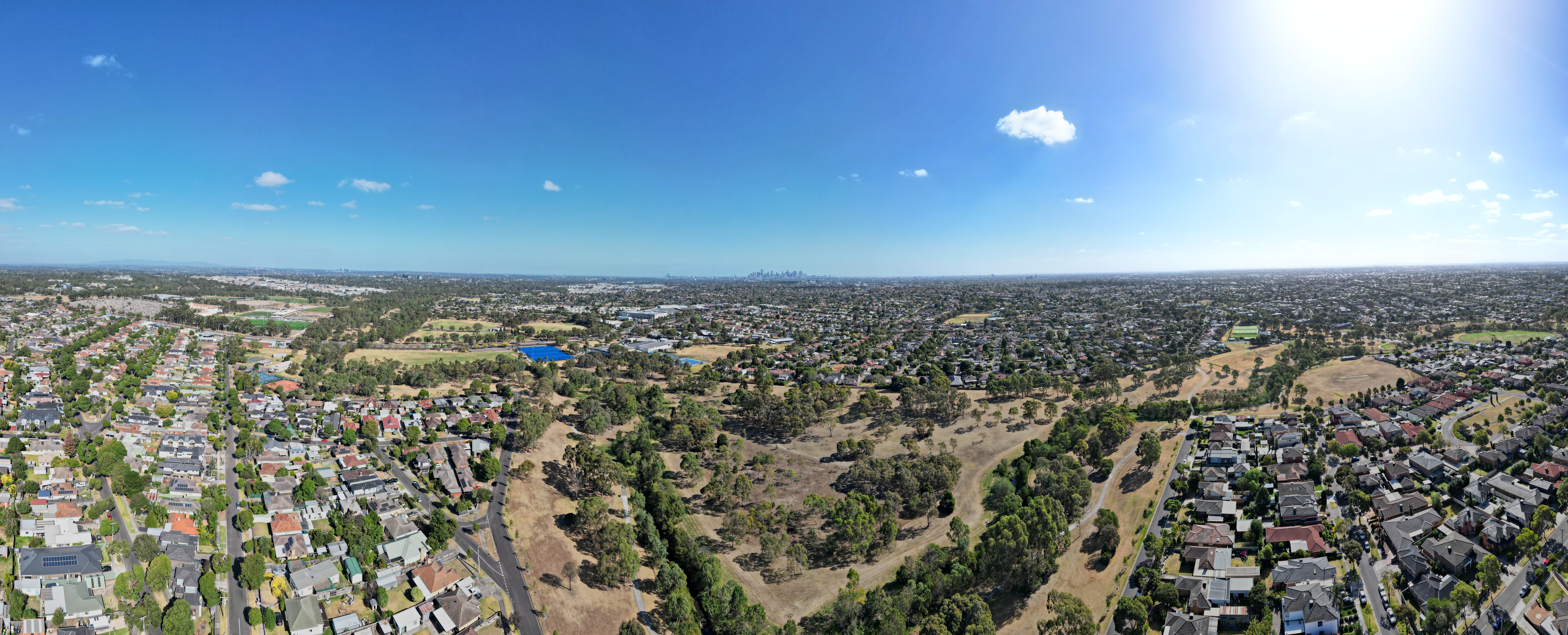
Reservoir aerial panorama facing Melbourne skyline. February 2024

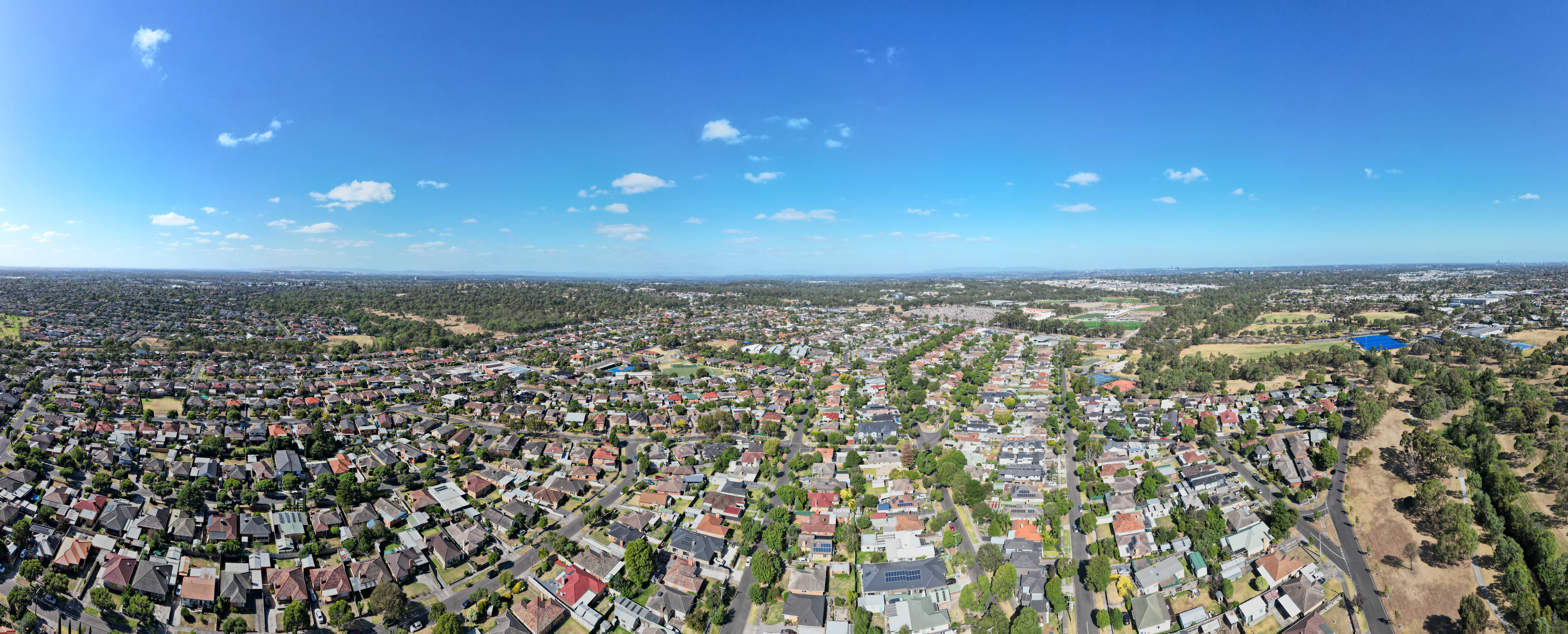
Reservoir aerial panorama facing north toward the Great Dividing Range. February 2024.

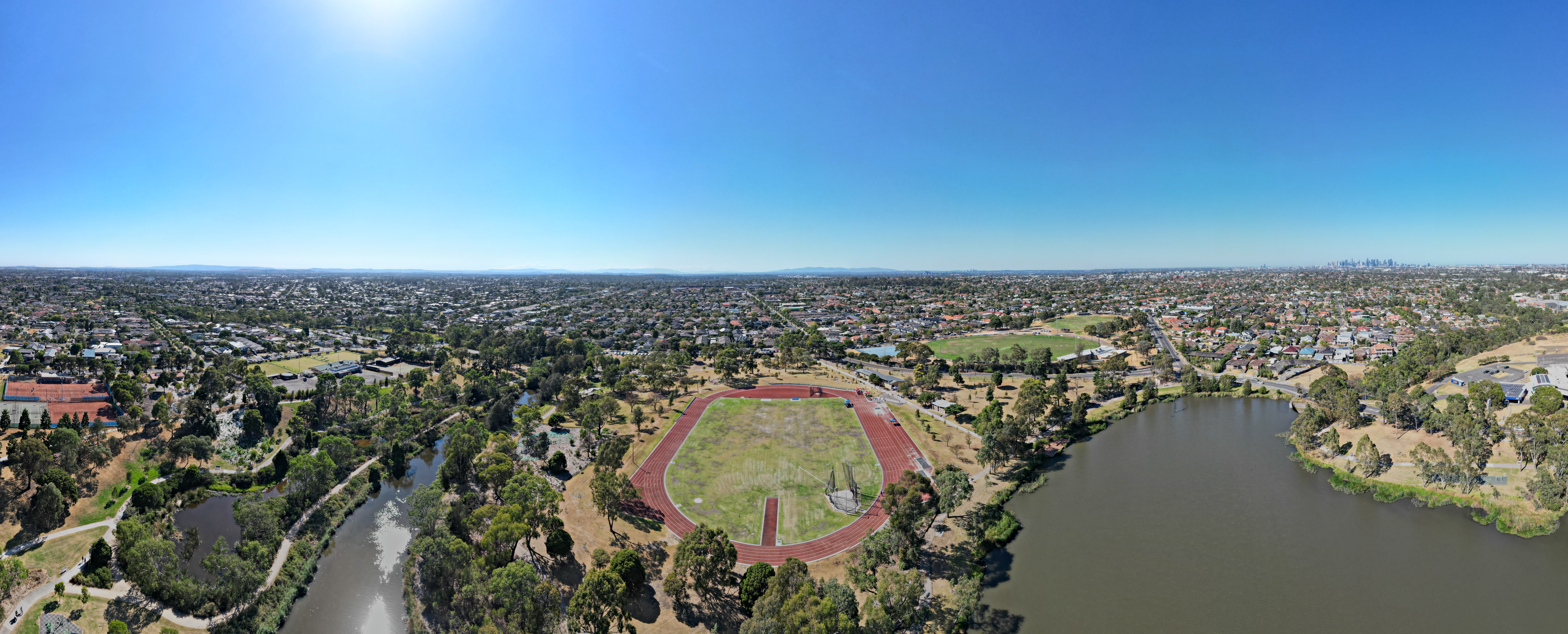
Edwardes Lake in Reservoir with the Preston Athletic Club in the middle of the frame. March 2024.

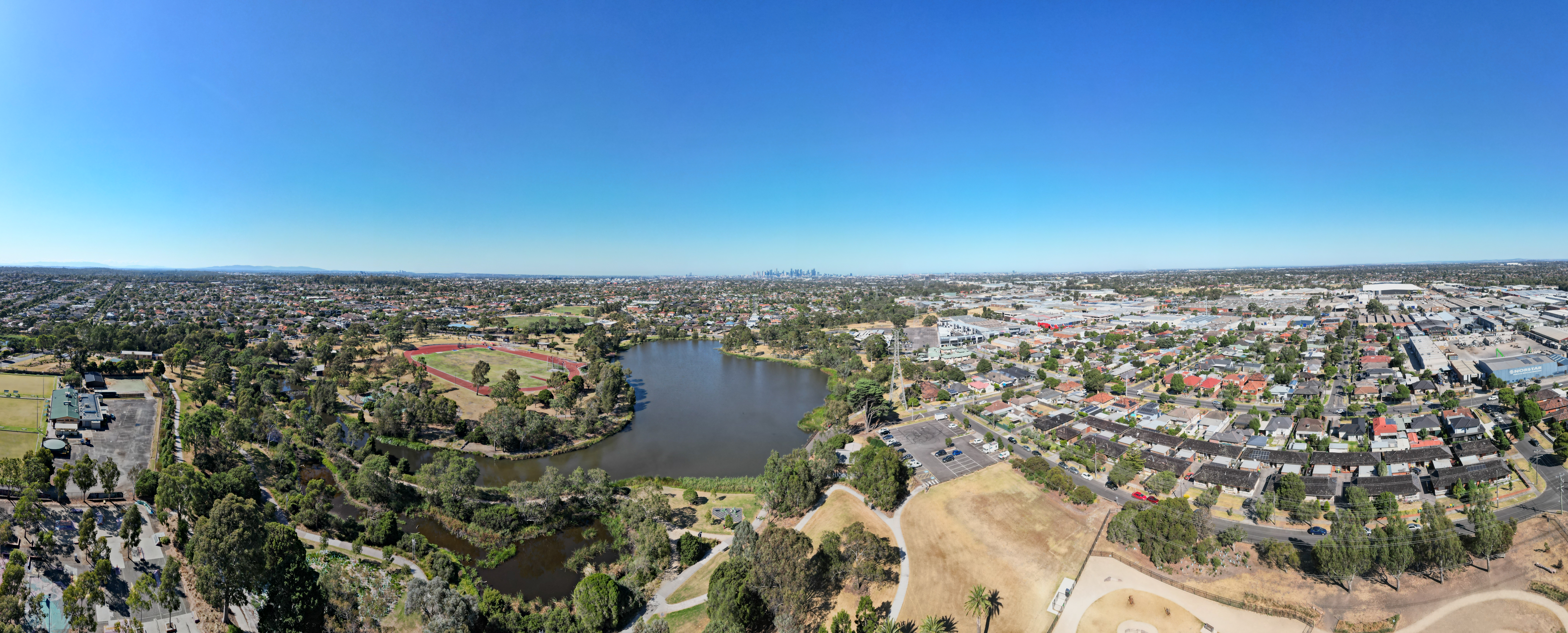
Edwardes Lake panorama facing the Melbourne skyline. March 2024.

Reservoir contains a mosque that was built by the Albanian Australian community.

== Demographics ==
The most common ancestries in Reservoir were, according to the 2016 census, Italian 17.1%, Australian 14.8%, English 13.9%, Greek 6.3% and Irish 5.1%. 55.9% of people were born in Australia. The most common countries of birth were Italy 8.2%, India 4.4%, China (excludes SARs and Taiwan) 3.2%, Greece 3.0% and Vietnam 1.8%.

== Transport ==
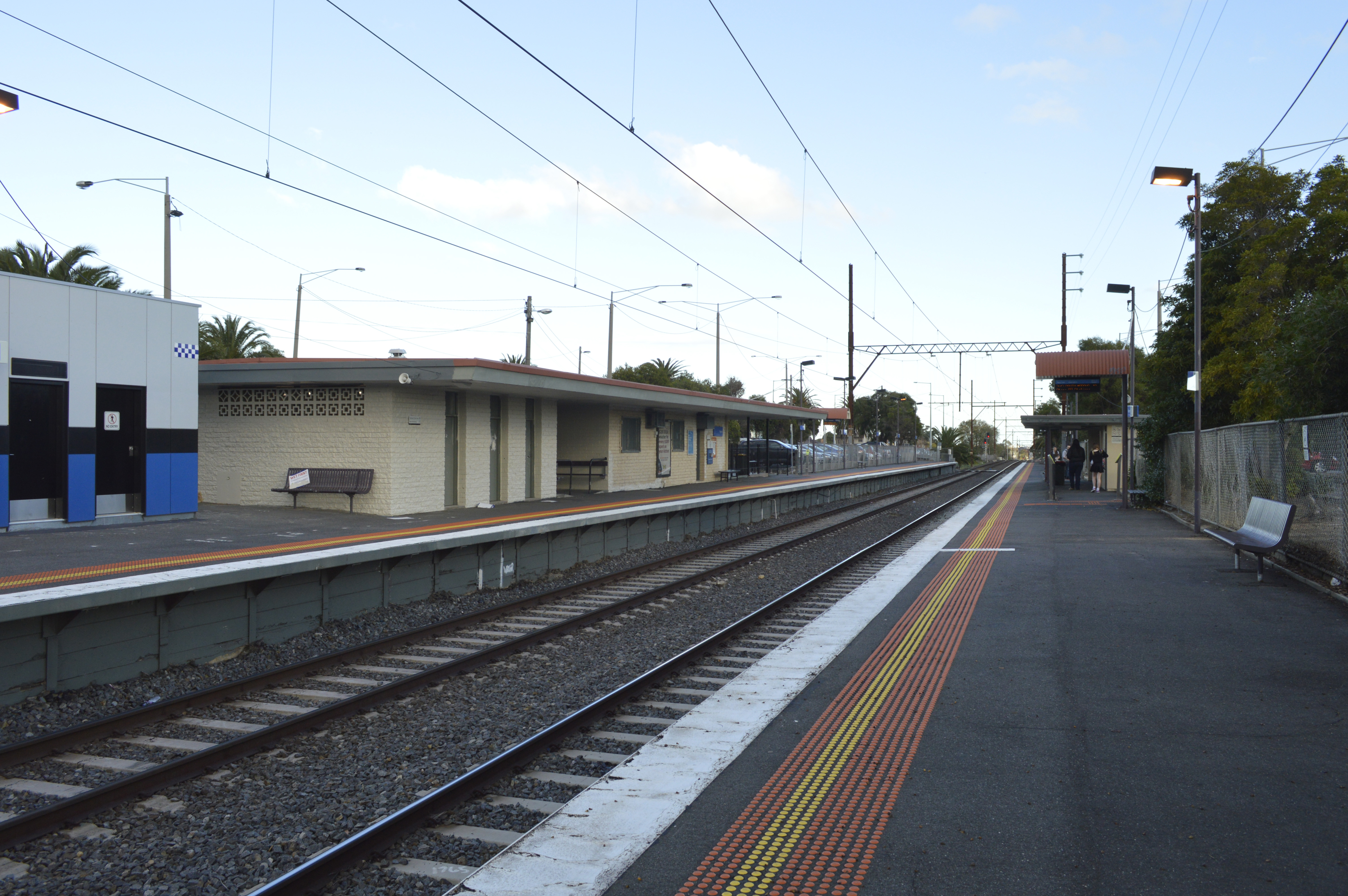
Regent railway station

=== Bus ===
Twelve bus routes service Reservoir:

- 301 : Reservoir station – La Trobe University. Operated by Dysons.
- 382 : Whittlesea – Northland Shopping Centre via South Morang station. Operated by Dysons.
- 526 : Coburg – Reservoir via Elizabeth Street. Operated by Ventura Bus Lines.
- 552 : North East Reservoir – Northcote Plaza via High Street. Operated by Kinetic Melbourne.
- 553 : Preston – West Preston via Reservoir. Operated by Kinetic Melbourne.
- 555 : Pacific Epping – Northland Shopping Centre via Lalor, Thomastown and Reservoir. Operated by Dysons.
- 556 : Pacific Epping – Northland Shopping Centre via Keon Park station. Operated by Dysons.
- 558 : Reservoir station – North West Reservoir. Operated by Kinetic Melbourne.
- 561 : Macleod – Pascoe Vale station via La Trobe University. Operated by Dysons.
- 566 : Lalor – Northland Shopping Centre via Childs Road, Plenty Road and Grimshaw Street. Operated by Dysons.
- 567 : Northcote – Regent station via Northland Shopping Centre. Operated by Kinetic Melbourne.
- SmartBus 902 : Chelsea station – Westfield Airport West. Operated by Kinetic Melbourne.

=== Cycling ===
The Merri Creek Trail and Darebin Creek Trail are shared-use recreational paths used by cyclists and walkers that pass through Reservoir.

=== Road ===
Reservoir has easy access to the Northern/Western Ring Rd, Hume Highway/Freeway, Tullamarine and Calder Freeways and Eastern Freeway.

=== Train ===
The area is serviced by four railway stations on the Mernda line: Reservoir, Regent, Keon Park and Ruthven.

The Victorian Government has announced that it will build an underground suburban rail loop, which will include a station at Reservoir.

=== Tram ===
Two tram routes service the area: (West Preston to Victoria Harbour, Docklands), terminating at the southern end of Reservoir on Gilbert Road, and (Bundoora RMIT to Waterfront City, Docklands), passing through Reservoir along Plenty Road.

== Education ==
- St Stephen's Parish Primary School
- Holy Name Primary School
- Reservoir Primary School
- Reservoir East Primary School
- Reservoir Views Primary School
- Reservoir West Primary School
- St Gabriel's Parish Primary School
- Reservoir High School
- William Ruthven Secondary College

== Sport ==
- Reservoir Football Club and West Preston Football Club are Australian rules football teams. Both compete in the Northern Football League.
- Northern Rugby Union Football Club
- iceHQ ice hockey and figure skating
- Preston Lions FC play soccer in the National Premier Leagues Victoria at B.T. Connor Reserve.
- Northern Darts Association
- Northside Roller Derby
- Victorian cricketer Ray Harvey lives in Reservoir.
- Australian Rules Footballer Jason Heatley was born in Reservoir.

== See also ==
- City of Preston – Reservoir was previously within this former local government area.
