= Marshall Road tram stop =

Tram stop in Melbourne, Australia

Marshall Road

General information
- Location: Matthews Avenue, Airport West, Melbourne, Victoria
- Owner: VicTrack
- Operator: Yarra Trams
- Platforms: 1
- Tracks: 1
- Connections: Bus

Construction
- Structure type: At-grade

Other information
- Status: Open
- Fare zone: Myki zone 1

History
- Opened: 22 December 1992

Services
Preceding station	Yarra Trams	Following station
Hawker Street towards Flinders Street Station	Route 59	Airport West Terminus

Marshall Road/Matthews Avenue is a tram stop on tram Route 59 in Melbourne. The stop opened in December 1992 as part of an extension from Hawker Street to serve Westfield Airport West.

== History ==
Plans to extend the Route 59 came quickly after its extension to Hawker Street in 1976. At the time, the route terminated 2 kilometres short of Airport West at Hawker Street. Public outcry quickly grew to extend the tram to the growing shopping centre which was reflected as the extension begun its planning in the 1988 MetPlan.

Funding was allocated to the extension and the stop in the 1991 state budget by the Kirner labor government. Many were skeptical about the extension however, funding was allocated at a time when Victoria was in an economic recession. The Kirner government wanted the project completed before the 1992 state election, fearing that a victorious liberal government would cancel the project.

Construction of the extension began in early 1992 with preliminary works underway by May 1992. The extension alongside the Airport West stop opened on 22 December 1992 at a cost of $4.9 million.

The extension opened during a time of renewed tram construction in Melbourne, other extensions around the time were along the Burwood Highway and Plenty Road.
