= Uni Hill Factory Outlets =

- Location: Bundoora, Melbourne Australia
- Coordinates: 37°41′06″S 145°04′41″E
- Opened: 2007; 19 years ago
- Developer: MAB Corporation
- Manager: MAB Corporation
- Owner: MAB Corporation
- Num. of stores: 98
- Num. of anchor tenants: 1
- Floors: 1
- Website: www.uhfo.com.au

Uni Hill Factory Outlets is a shopping precinct located in the University Hill area of Bundoora in the outer north eastern suburbs of Melbourne, Australia. Brand Junction is one of nine precincts anticipated by the Janefield Development Plan, which was approved on 20 July 2004 by the City of Whittlesea and contains a mix of residential, commercial, retail and industry intended to be developed over the next 10–12 years by Melbourne property developer MAB Corporation on a 103.8-hectare (256.5-acre) site which is bounded by Plenty Road to the west, the Metropolitan Ring Road to the south, the Plenty Road Gorge Parklands to the east and RMIT University's Bundoora East Campus to the north.

Brand Junction, which was approved by the City of Whittlesea in 2005, has been built by St Hilliers at an expected cost of A$40 million, and is expected to include a Coles supermarket, 28 specialty stores and up to 90 factory outlets in tenancies ranging from 80 square meters to over 500 square meters and offering discounted fashion, footwear, homewares, shopping and lifestyle goods from name brands. Some tenants already signed up include Laura Ashley, Harris Scarfe, Roger David and Wittner.

== History of University Hill ==
Historically, what is now the University Hill precinct was originally used from October 1920 until July 1925 as a farm by the Australian Red Cross for training ex-servicemen convalescing for tuberculosis. On 27 October 1937, the 960-acre (4 km^{2}) site, known as Janefield, was gazetted as a centre for children with severe intellectual disabilities, and the first children were moved to the facility from Kew Cottages a month later. It was known by the unfortunate title of Janefield Colony for the Treatment of Mental Defectives until 1962, after which it became a Training Centre under the provisions of the Mental Health Act 1959. At its height, the centre had a special school, farm, gym, family unit, swimming pool and theatre. Due in part to changing community attitudes about the care of intellectually disabled people, the centre was closed in 1995 by the Kennett Liberal government, and residents were moved into new residential accommodation just north of the site, at a site known as Plenty Residential Services. Reserves over the rest of the land (about 1.2 square kilometres (297 acres)) were revoked under section 10 of the Land (Miscellaneous Matters) and National Tennis Centre (Amendment) Act 1994, to facilitate the sale and redevelopment of the land for residential purposes as part of the then-Federal Government's "Building Better Cities" program.

The land was subsequently purchased by the Royal Melbourne Institute of Technology (RMIT, later RMIT University) in July 1997 at a cost of A$12 million, with the intention of building a technology estate, a neighbourhood shopping centre, a residential subdivision and recreational facilities (including a golf course) on the site. The final master plan was approved by the City of Whittlesea in November 1998. However, a status report presented to the University's board on 30 October 2001, delivered in the midst of a cash crisis for the University as a whole, recommended "that efforts and activities to develop and implement the RMIT Technology Estate as a major physical project on the Janefield site should cease". The report attributed the failure to implement the project to several factors, including lack of State Government support, absence of private sector involvement and investment, and inadequate resources within RMIT. On 5 March 2003 the Victorian Minister for Education granted permission for the University to sell the 103.8 hectares (256.5 acres) still in their possession, and a public tender process was conducted on RMIT's behalf by Jones Lang LaSalle. The tender was won by Melbourne developer MAB Corporation, who worked with the City of Whittlesea to create a new master plan for a mixed-use urban village consisting of industrial, retail, residential and community facilities.
