= Bundoora =

- Suburb
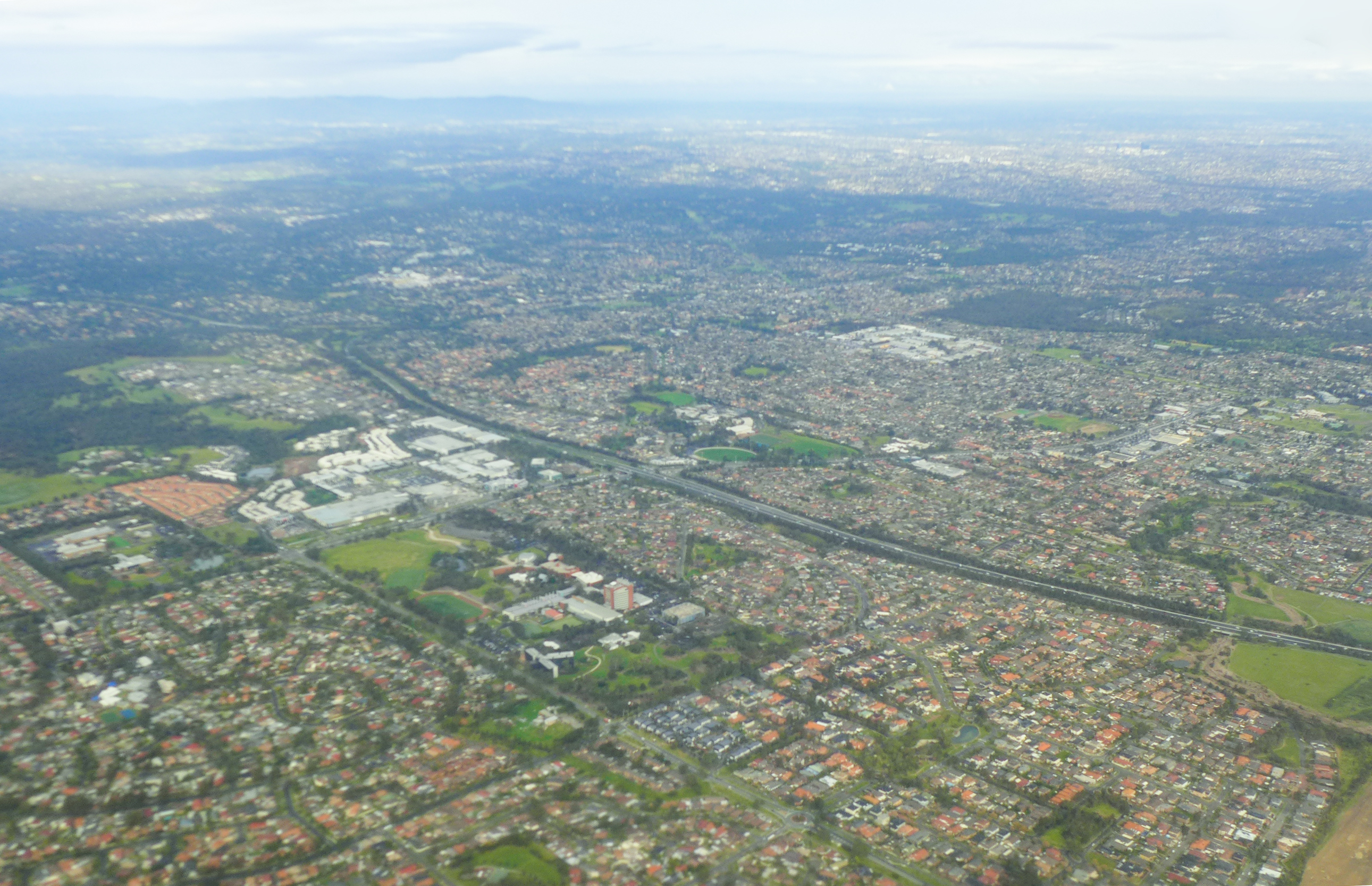
- Aerial view of Bundoora, 2017

- Interactive map of Bundoora
- Coordinates: 37.695°S 145.064°E
- Country: Australia
- State: Victoria
- City: Melbourne
- LGAs: City of Banyule; City of Darebin; City of Whittlesea
- Location: 15 km (9.3 mi) NE of Melbourne

Government
  - State electorate: Bundoora
  - Federal divisions: Cooper; Jagajaga; Scullin

Area
  - Total: 15 km^{2} (5.8 sq mi)

Population
  - Total: 28,068 (2021 census)
  - Density: 1,870/km^{2} (4,850/sq mi)
- Postcode: 3083
Suburbs around Bundoora
Lalor	Mill Park	Greensborough; Plenty
Reservoir; Thomastown	Bundoora	Watsonia; Watsonia North
Kingsbury	Heidelberg West	Macleod

Bundoora is a suburb in Melbourne, Victoria, Australia, 15 km (9.3 mi) north-east of Melbourne's Central Business District, located within the Cities of Banyule, Darebin and Whittlesea local government areas. Bundoora recorded a population of 28,068 at the 2021 census.

Bundoora is the headquarters of La Trobe University, Bundoora Campus. Royal Melbourne Institute of Technology (RMIT) also has a campus situated in Bundoora.

== History ==
The Bundoora area was originally inhabited by the Kurnaj-berring tribe of the Wurundjeri clan. The name "Bundoora" is derived from "Kelbundoora", the name of a 19th-century Wurundjeri man. Prior to European settlement, there were several large wetlands that were utilised by members of the Kurnaj-berring tribe.

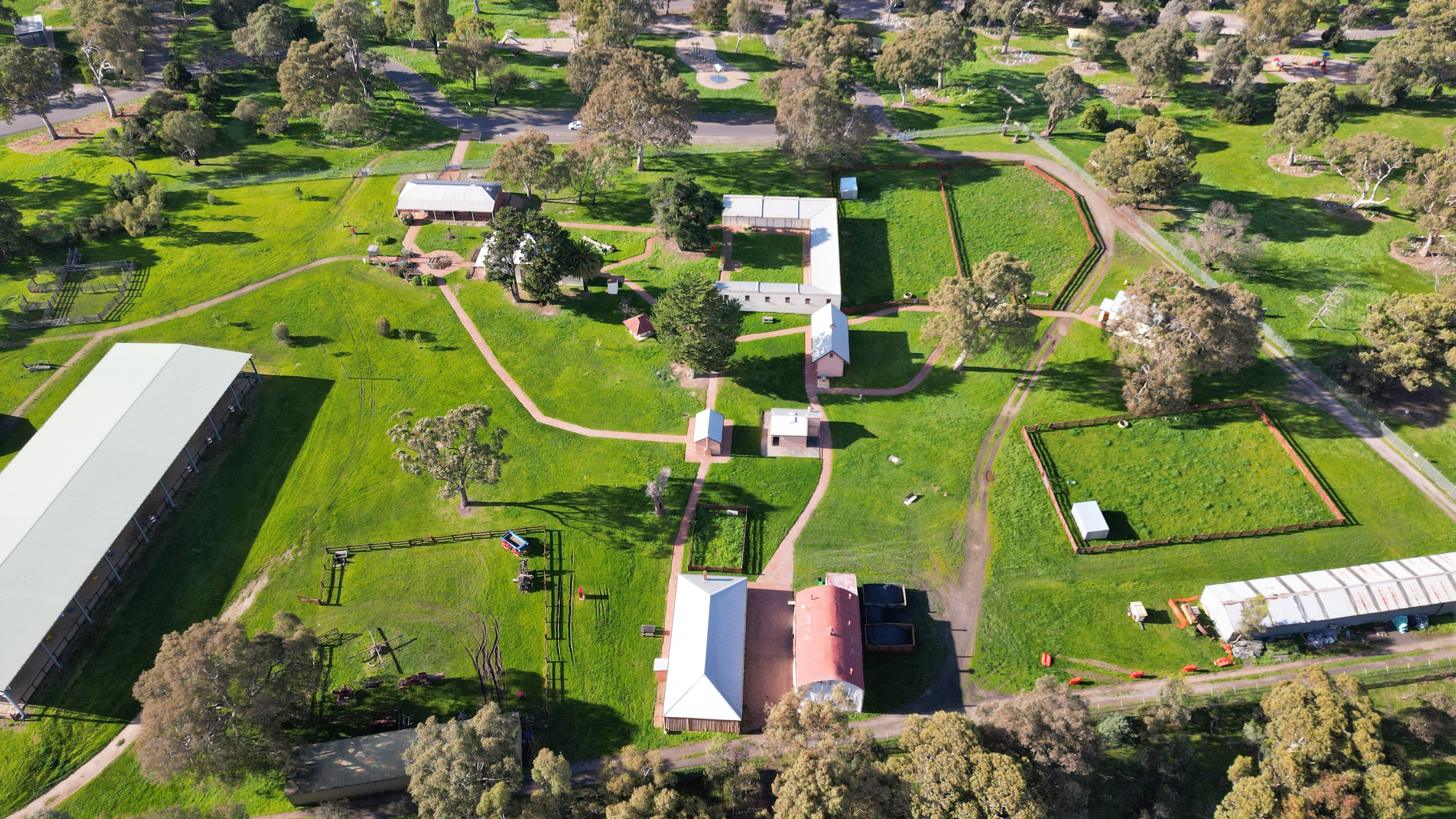
Bundoora Farm and Cafe from above, June 2023

Europeans first arrived in the Bundoora area, known at the time as the Parish of Keelbundora, in 1835. The land for surveyed in 1837 by William Wedge-Drake, to allow for the sale of land. The land has previously been owned by members of the Port Phillip Association, such as John Batman, who grazed their sheep there without regard for the Wurundjeri clan. The land was subsequently auctioned in Melbourne in 1838, with Bundoora being sectioned off into two areas of approximately 400 hectares. The land was purchased by well-off individuals and land speculators, who resold the land within a few months, this time in blocks of 40 to 120 hectares (100 to 300 acres). It was primarily used for sheep grazing and grain production.

Bundoora Post Office opened on 1 October 1863.

In 1899 John Matthew Vincent Smith (1857–1923) purchased the 245 hectares (606 acres) property Bundoora Park. Smith was a well-known horse breeder and used the property to raise racing horses. Smith organised a competition for the design of a new homestead, and Sydney Herbert Wilson, who also designed the Malvern Town Hall, claimed the prize of fifty pounds. The Bundoora homestead remains a significant example of Federation Queen Anne style architecture.

The Floridia Cheese Company was formed in 1955 by the Montalto family, after purchasing a small factory in Bundoora.

=== Heritage listings ===
The following places in Bundoora are listed on the Victorian Heritage Register:

- Bundoora Park Homestead, 7–27 Snake Gully Drive, built as a homestead, repurposed as a repatriation hospital, and now a contemporary arts centre
- Maroondah Water Supply System, also located in Reservoir and Preston, and in the local government areas of Nillumbik, Whittlesea, and the Yarra Ranges Shire
- Yan Yean Water Supply System, also located in Thomastown, Reservoir, Preston, Thornbury, and Northcote, and in the local government areas of Mitchell, Whittlesea, and the City of Yarra

== Geography ==
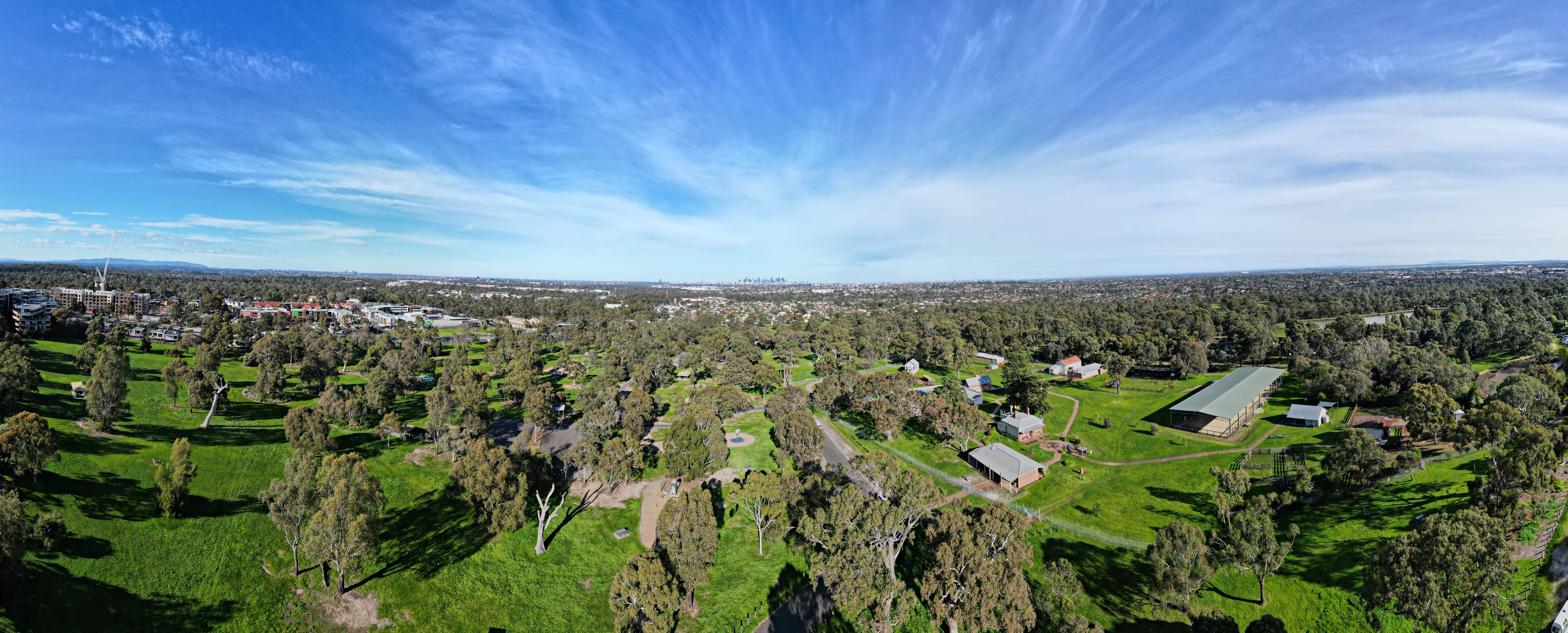
Aerial panorama of Bundoora from above, facing the Melbourne skyline, June 2023

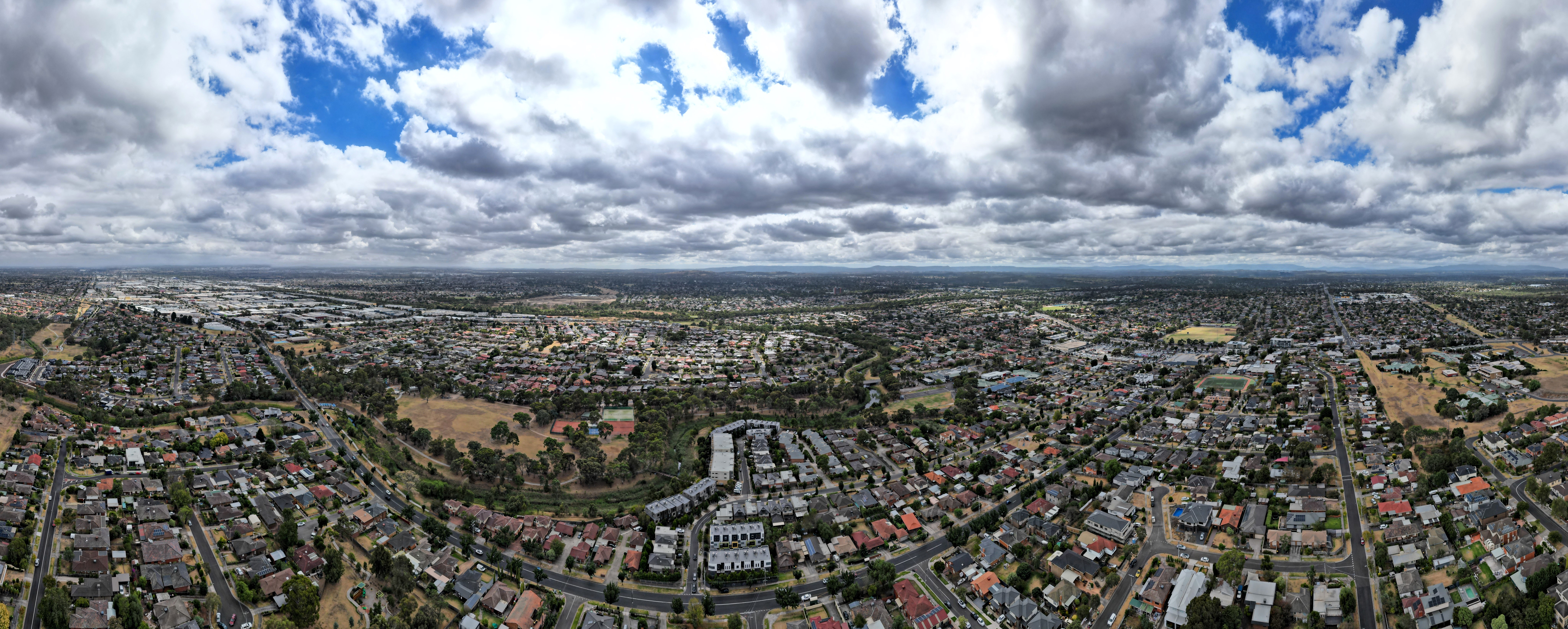
Bundoora aerial panorama facing the Great Dividing Range. March 2024.

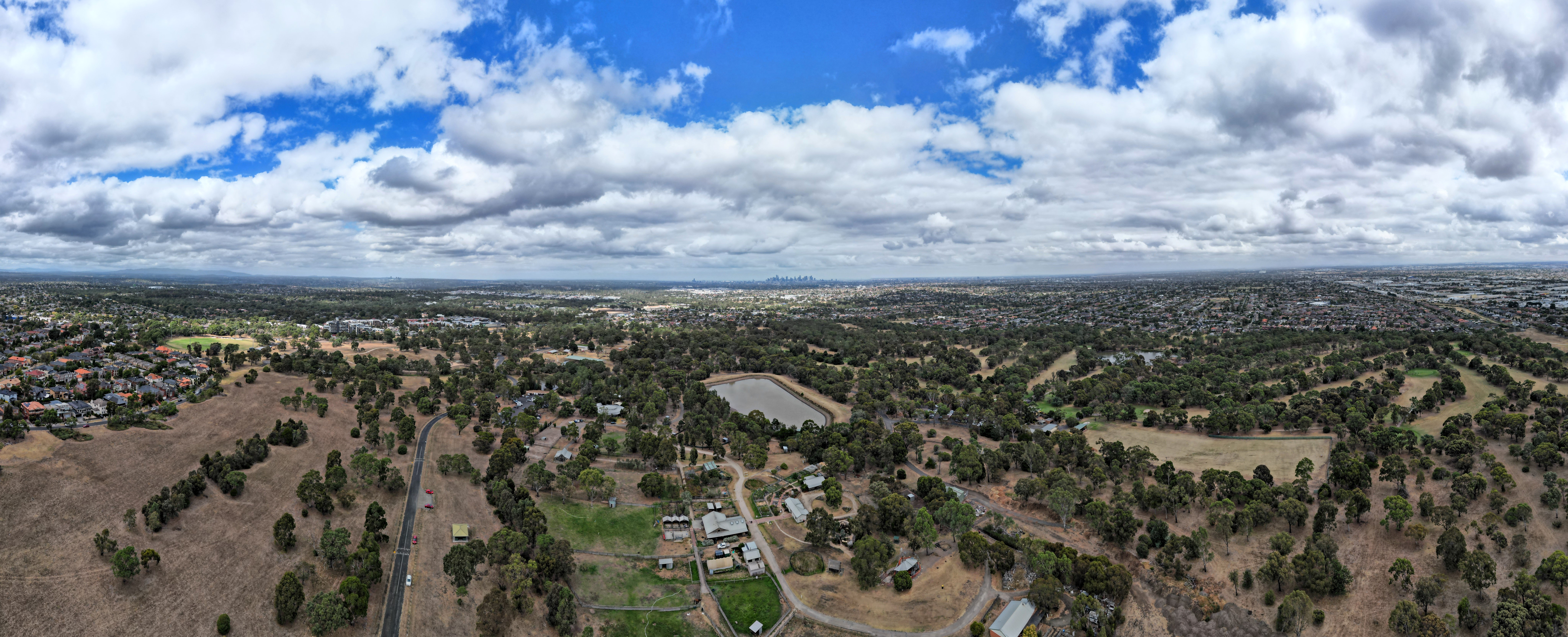
Bundoora aerial panorama facing the Melbourne skyline. March 2024.

Bundoora is a very large suburb, spanning from Preston in its south-west, up to Plenty in the north-east, and covering three local government areas. Bundoora is home to Mount Cooper, located within Bundoora Park, a large (180ha) public park, and is often claimed to be Metropolitan Melbourne's highest point.

== Demographics ==
In the 2016 census, there were 28,653 people in Bundoora.

- The most common ancestries in Bundoora were English 14.8%, Australian 14.2%, Chinese 12.4%, Italian 9.6% and Irish 5.5%.
- 54.3% of people were born in Australia. The next most common countries of birth were China 10.2%, India 3.4%, Italy 2.3%, Greece 2.0% and Sri Lanka 1.9%.
- 50.2% of people spoke only English at home. Other languages spoken at home included Mandarin 11.0%, Italian 4.1%, Greek 3.7%, Arabic 3.1%.
- The most common responses for religion were Catholic 27.1%, No Religion 27.0% and Eastern Orthodox 9.3%.

== Local sites ==
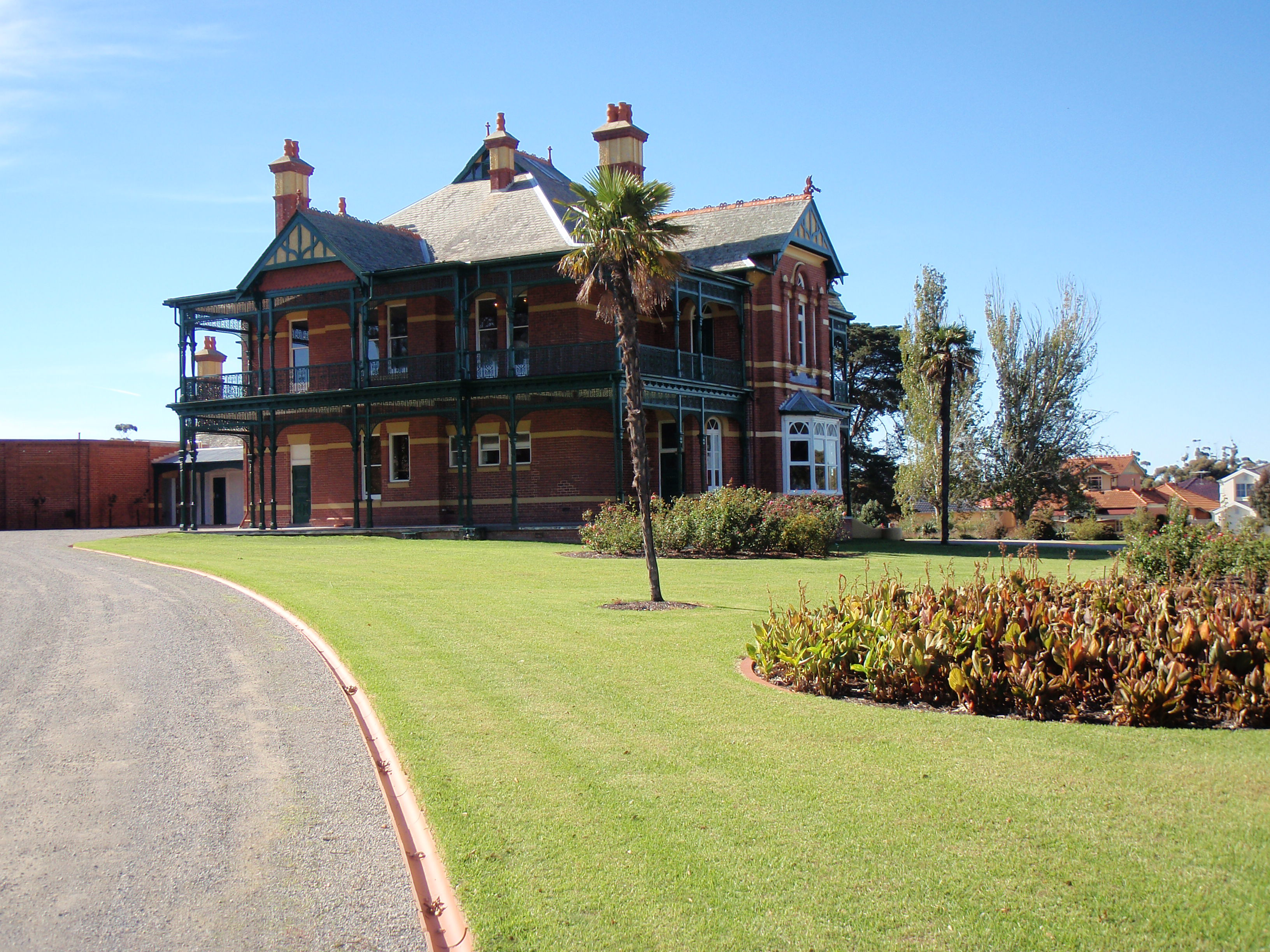
Historic Bundoora Homestead and Art Gallery

- Although, technically in Thomastown, the Bundoora All-Weather Market was until recently a major Melbourne market. This market has been demolished and replaced by a homemaker centre.
- Greensborough Lanes is a bowling alley that, despite its name, is located in Bundoora.
- University Hill is a business park home to the Australian Headquarters of Continental AG, NOVA iT GROUP and Bundoora BMW with many others, and a Hotel to serve visitors to the area.
- Uni Hill Factory Outlets, a DFO-style discount shopping mall, was opened at University Hill in November 2008. It was originally known as Brand Junction.

== Education ==
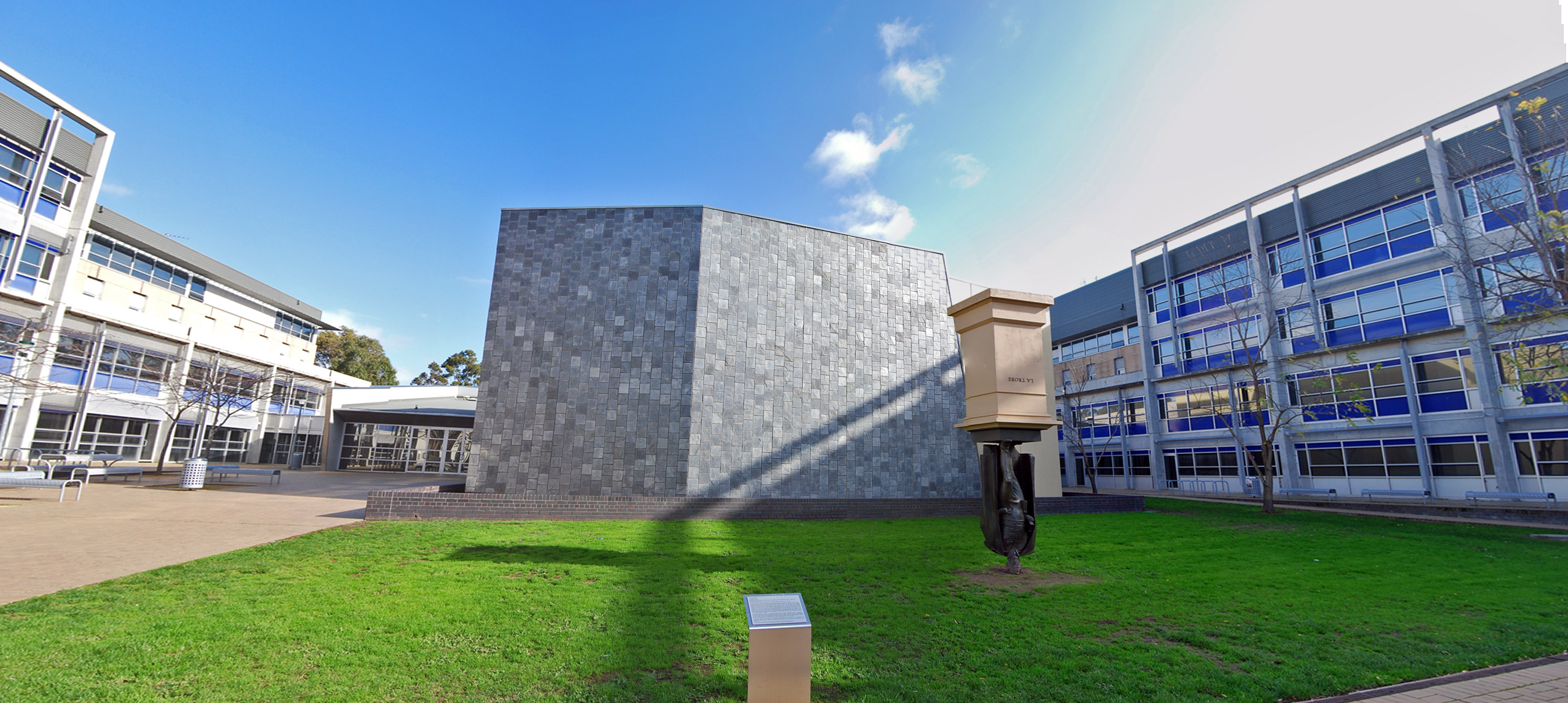
Health Sciences Building, La Trobe University

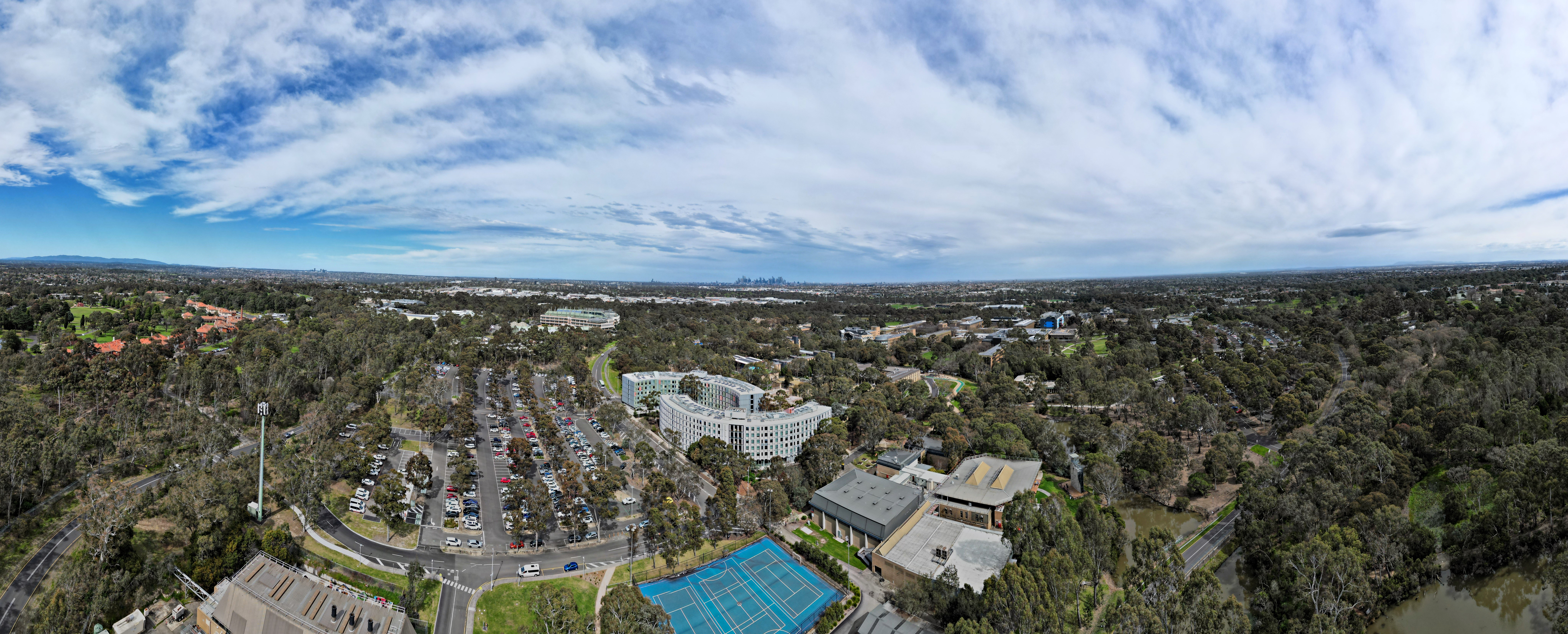
La Trobe University Bundoora Campus aerial panorama, facing south towards the city skyline, September 2023

- La Trobe University, established in 1964, is Victoria's third university, with Bundoora being the location of its flagship campus.
- RMIT University's Bundoora West Campus is located at the terminus of the tramline. Further down the road is the East Campus area, home of RMIT's Wind Tunnel. It is also home of the RMIT University Sports Statistics Research Group.
- Bundoora Secondary College is a coeducational public secondary school.
- Parade College is a Catholic independent secondary school for boys .
- Loyola College is a Catholic independent secondary school in the Ignatian tradition, bordering Bundoora and Watsonia.
- The Concord School, for students with additional learning needs.
- Northside Christian College
- Norris Bank Primary School
- Bundoora Primary School is Victorian school no.1915, currently located at Balmoral Avenue, Bundoora. The original school was built in 1877 and located at 222 Plenty Road, Bundoora. This building is now the home of Nino Child Care Centre.
- St Damian's Catholic Primary School

== Healthcare ==
- Northpark Private Hospital
- Bundoora Extended Care Centre, part of the Northern Health Network. A sub acute hospital providing medical care for over 100 inpatients and community outpatients.
- La Trobe Private Hospital

== Transport ==
=== Bus ===
Fifteen bus routes service Bundoora:

- 250 : Melbourne CBD (Queen Street) – La Trobe University. Operated by Kinetic Melbourne.
- 301 : Reservoir station – La Trobe University. Operated by Dysons.
- 350 : Queen Street (Melbourne CBD) – La Trobe University via the Eastern Freeway. Operated by Kinetic Melbourne.
- 382 : Whittlesea – Northland Shopping Centre via South Morang station. Operated by Dysons.
- 383 : Mill Park Lakes Palisades Estate – University Hill. Operated by Dysons.
- 386 : Mernda station – RMIT University Bundoora Campus via Cravens Rd and South Morang station. Operated by Dysons.
- 387 : Mernda station – RMIT University Bundoora Campus via Hawkstowe Pde and South Morang. Operated by Dysons.
- 548 : Kew (Cotham Road) – La Trobe University. Operated by Ventura Bus Lines.
- 550 : Northland Shopping Centre – La Trobe University via Waterdale Road. Operated by Ventura Bus Lines.
- 551 : Heidelberg station – La Trobe University. Operated by Ventura Bus Lines.
- 561 : Macleod – Pascoe Vale station via La Trobe University. Operated by Dysons.
- 564 : RMIT University Bundoora Campus – South Morang station. Operated by Dysons.
- 566 : Lalor – Northland Shopping Centre via Childs Road, Plenty Road and Grimshaw Street. Operated by Dysons.
- 570 : Thomastown station – RMIT University Bundoora Campus. Operated by Dysons.
- SmartBus 902 : Chelsea station – Westfield Airport West. Operated by Kinetic Melbourne.

=== Cycling ===
The Western Ring Road Trail and Darebin Creek Trail provides facilities for recreational and commuting cyclists.

=== Train ===
The nearest railway stations to Bundoora are Macleod and Watsonia, on the Hurstbridge line, and South Morang, Thomastown, Keon Park and Reservoir, on the Mernda line.

=== Tram ===
Bundoora is the terminus of tram route, which operates from McKimmies Road near RMIT University, to Waterfront City in Docklands. The line was extended from Tyler Street in Preston towards Bundoora along Plenty Road over several stages in the 1980s. The line reached Bundoora in 1985 when it was extended to La Trobe University. It was later extended to Bundoora Square in 1987, and finally to its current terminus at McKimmies Road in 1995. The last W2 class tram ran along this route in mid-1987.

== Sport ==
- Bundoora has a football team competing in the Northern Football League.
- Golfers play at the Bundoora Park Public Course on Plenty Road, at the course of the Strathallan Golf Club on Main Drive or at the course of the Kings Park Golf Club on Plenty Road.
- Bundoora is also home to the Bundoora Brumbies Baseball Club, with the club competing in the Melbourne Winter Baseball League in B and D grade division, with reserves teams in both B reserve and D reserve. The club also has a Women's team that competes in the Baseball Victoria Summer League Women's section.
- The Home of the Matildas, the administrative and training headquarters of the Australia women's national football team and A-League Women club Melbourne Victory FC is located in Bundoora, adjacent to the La Trobe University main campus.
- The Victorian Rugby Centre of Excellence, which serves as the home ground of Melbourne Rebels Women and where Rugby Victoria's administration, sport development programs and high-performance training is based, is located in Bundoora, adjacent to the La Trobe University main campus.

== Facilities ==
Nearby libraries include Watsonia Library, Diamond Valley Library and Mill Park Library, which are operated by Yarra Plenty Regional Library.

== Notable residents ==
- Clinton McKay – Australian cricketer
- Gotye – an Australian musician who studied at Parade College.
- Pseudo Echo – a pop music band
- Peter Helliar – comedian
- James Wharton – an Australian racing driver

== Books on Bundoora ==
Kenna, Len In the Beginning there was only the land Bundoora, Vic. Lions Club of Bundoora, 1988 ISBN 0731623177

== See also ==
- City of Preston – Parts of Bundoora were previously within this former local government area.
- Shire of Diamond Valley – Parts of Bundoora were previously within this former local government area.
- Electoral district of Bundoora
