= Bundoora Park Homestead =

Heritage-listed house in Melbourne, Victoria, Australia

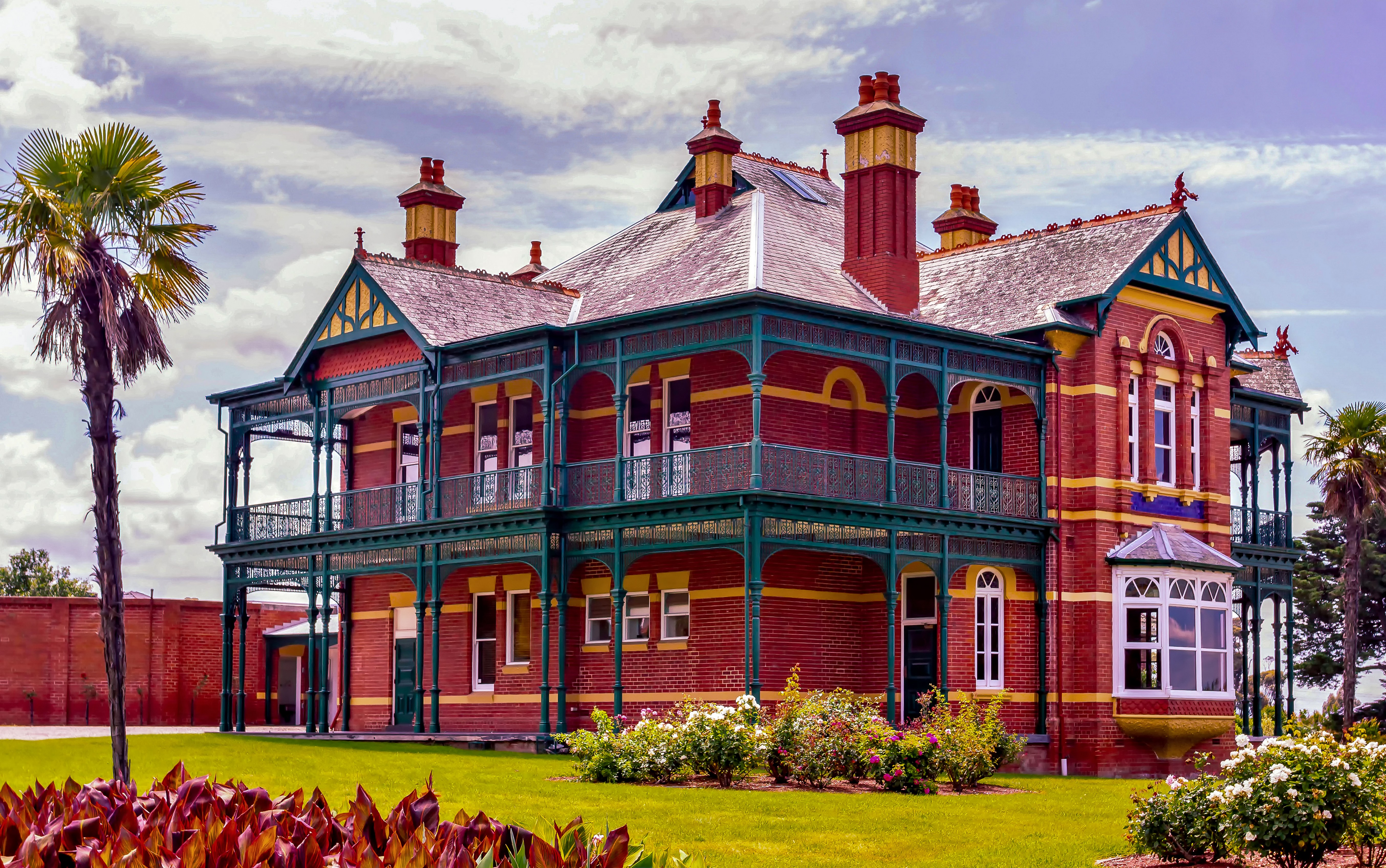
- The homestead in 2011

- Location of the former homestead in Greater Metropolitan Melbourne
- Former names: Bundoora Repatriation Hospital (Note: Other names included: Bundoora Convalescent Farm (1920-1924); Bundoora Repatriation Mental Hospital "B" (1924-1933); and Repatriation Mental Hospital, Bundoora (1933-1993).)
- Alternative names: Bundoora Homestead; Bundoora Homestead Art Centre

General information
- Status: Completed
- Type: Homestead (1900–1920); Repatriation hospital (1920–1993); Contemporary arts centre (since 2001– )
- Architectural style: Federation Queen Anne
- Location: 7–27 Snake Gully Drive, Bundoora, City of Darebin, Melbourne, Victoria, Australia
- Coordinates: 37°42′18″S 145°03′02″E
- Year built: 1899–1900
- Completed: 1900; 126 years ago
- Client: John Matthew Vincent Smith
- Owner: J. M. V. Smith (1899–1920); Australian Government (1920–c. 1993); Victorian Government (c. 1993–1997); City of Darebin (1997– )

Technical details
- Material: Red bricks; fibrous plaster; stained glass
- Grounds: 245 ha (606 acres) (1899)

Design and construction
- Architects: Sydney Herbert Wilson; with Percy Oakden
- Other designers: Auguste Fischer (stained glass)
- Main contractor: J. B. Sewell & Co

Website
- arts.darebin.vic.gov.au

Victorian Heritage Register
- Official name: Bundoora Park Homestead
- Type: Registered place
- Designated: 10 August 1995
- Reference no.: H1091
- Heritage overlay no.: HO74
- Categories: Health Services; Residential buildings (private)

The Bundoora Park Homestead, also called the Bundoora Homestead and the Bundoora Homestead Art Centre, is a former homestead, a former repatriation hospital, and now contemporary arts centre, located at 7–27 Snake Gully Drive in Bundoora, in the City of Darebin, in the northern suburbs of Melbourne, in Victoria, Australia. The site operated as a homestead between 1900 and 1920; and then as a repatriation hospital from 1920 to 1993. Following restoration of the homestead, the building opened in 2001 as a contemporary arts centre.

Built between 1899 and 1900 on the traditional lands of the Wurundjeri Woi-wurrung people, the former homestead was added to the Victorian Heritage Register on 10 August 1995 in recognition of its historical and architectural significance; and was also added to a non-statutory list by the Victorian branch of the National Trust on 3 February 1997.

== History ==
In 1899 John Matthew Vincent Smith (1857–1923) purchased the 245 hectares (606 acres) property Bundoora Park. Smith was a well-known horse breeder and used the property to raise racing horses. Smith organised a competition for the design of a new homestead, and Sydney Herbert Wilson, who also designed the Malvern Town Hall, claimed the prize of fifty pounds. Wilson, in conjunction with Percy Oakden, designed the two-storey that was built by J. B. Sewell & Co in 1900. During Smith's ownership of the estate, the colt, Wallace, considered the best of Carbine's Australian-bred progeny, was raised at the stud.

The property was compulsorily acquired by the Repatriation Commission in 1920 and became the Repatriation Mental Hospital, Bundoora in 1924. The homestead was converted into a day hospital in 1968 and utilised as such until the Bundoora Repatriation Hospital was decommissioned in 1993. (Note: For a detailed summary of the various reiterations as a repatriation hospital, including bed numbers, refer to the Public Record Office Victoria.) Dr John Cade AO, a psychiatrist, served as a medical officer at the Bundoora Repatriation Hospital where, in 1949, he discovered the benefits of using lithium salts as a mood stabiliser for treating patients impacted by bipolar disorder.

The Victoria Police stud and stables operated from Bundoora Park from 1930 until 1952.

Transferred from the Australian government to the Victorian government in 1993, the majority of the buildings, covered ways, paths and other features that had formed the hospital complex were demolished by December 1996, leaving the former mansion standing alone and unoccupied. In 1997, the Victorian government gifted Bundoora Homestead to the City of Darebin who set about restoring the mansion. Restored by 2001, Bundoora Homestead reopened as a centre for contemporary art.

== Description ==
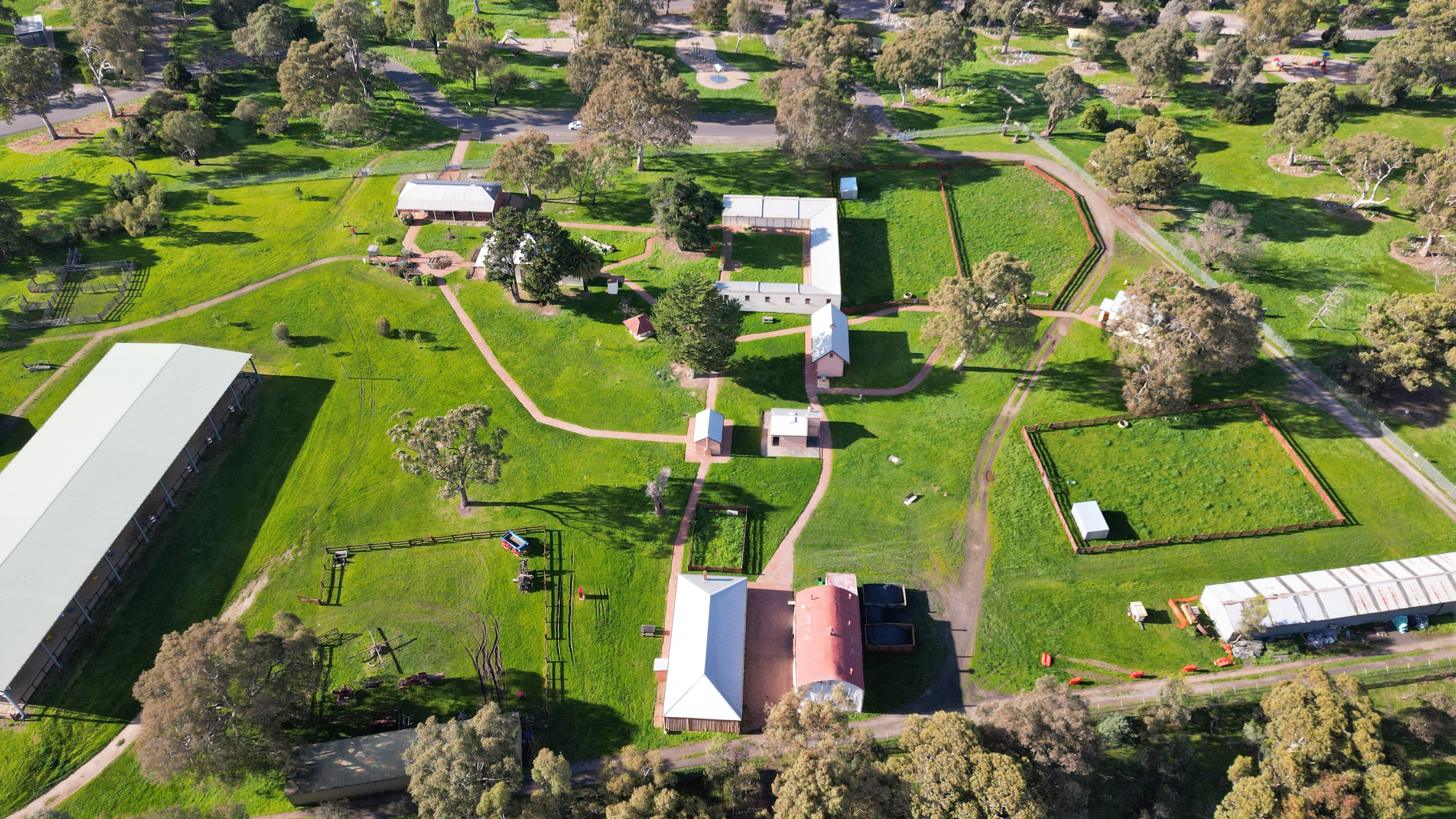
An overhead view of the homestead and associated buildings, in 2023

The site comprises the two-storey 14-room mansion in an asymmetrical red brick Federation Queen Anne style, former stables, stud master's cottage, blacksmith's shop, and sheds. The house originally consisted of an entrance hall, grand stair hall with oval stained glass ceiling, a drawing room (probably converted to a billiard room by 1910), parlour, dining room and service wing. Upstairs, eight bedrooms and three bathrooms were situated off wide balconies with views of the Melbourne city centre, the Dandenong Ranges, and Mount Macedon.

The Bundoora Park Homestead is important as the building contains several significant pieces of stained glass which can be attributed to Auguste Fischer who was a leader in Arts and Crafts circles and an important glass artist of the period, and which has considerable intrinsic artistic merit. The large stairwell oval light is particularly outstanding.

The Bundoora Park Homestead, and its later use as a psychiatric repatriation facility, has important social associations as its acquisition indicates the urgent need for accommodation and care for returned service personnel. The building's isolation suited the prevailing official and public attitudes to the mentally ill and at the same time provided a restful environment for rehabilitation and the opportunity for self sufficiency in food production.

The interior decoration of the Bundoora Park Homestead demonstrates outstanding examples of stained glass, architectural pyrography work, and other fine craftsmanship. The staircase and upper landing are decorated with a complete and consistent set of pyrography panels that are outstanding in terms of their number and intact condition, and their rarity as an example of pyrography work used architecturally. Other internal decorative features also exhibit outstanding craftsmanship.

== See also ==
- Architecture of Melbourne
- List of places on the Victorian Heritage Register in the City of Darebin
