= Mount Cooper =

Mountain in Melbourne, Victoria, Australia

Coordinates: 37°42′4″S 145°2′51″E

Mount Cooper is located within Bundoora Park, a large (180 ha) public park, in the Melbourne suburb of Bundoora, and peaks at 137 meters above sea level. Mount Cooper is accessible by car via Mount Cooper Scenic Drive.

In at least one publication the peak is called Mount Prospect, or Bundoora Hill, but the height appears to have been recorded incorrectly at 102.5m. Greswell Hill, a smaller rise to the east is referred to by the same source as Mount Sugarloaf, however its given height, at 132m, strangely matches more closely that of the present Mount Cooper.

Mount Cooper was named for prominent early landowner, Horatio Cooper who was an assistant to Robert Hoddle during the first land sale of Melbourne. His property was called Norris Bank and a park still remains with this name in Bundoora.

== See also ==
- List of mountains in Australia § Victoria
