= MAB Corporation =

- Type: Private
- Industry: Property development
- Founded: 1995
- Headquarters: 441 St Kilda Road, Melbourne, Australia
- Key people: Michael Buxton, executive director & co-founder Andrew Buxton, managing director & co-founder David Hall, COO
- Revenue: A$250 million
- Website: www.mabcorp.com.au

MAB Corporation is an integrated property company that develops, owns and manages property assets and built environments throughout Australia. The company was founded in 1995 by Michael Buxton, who began his career working in his family's business, and Andrew Buxton, who started out working in the quarry and asphalt industry.

== Overview ==
MAB Corporation is an Australian company that develops commercial, residential, retail and industrial properties. Many of MAB’s projects have been in the city of Melbourne, the capital of the south eastern state of Victoria.

== Developments ==
Developments undertaken recently by MAB Corporation include the village of NewQuay in the Docklands precinct and Bundoora's billion dollar mixed-use estate, University Hill. The company also played a major role in the 'rebirth' and development of the city's once very industrial bay side suburb of Port Melbourne.

== Revenue ==
With $1.5 billion in projects completed or commenced, MAB Corporation generates approximately $200 million in annual sales, has net assets approaching $200 million and employs a number of people across a range of areas, including new projects and strategy innovation, developments, business parks, asset management and funds management; the latter handling approximately $200 million under management.
