= Plenty Road =

Major urban road in Melbourne, Australia

Plenty Road Victoria
- Coordinates: 37.514120°S 145.114784°E (North end); 37.752129°S 145.001734°E (South end)

General information
- Type: Road
- Length: 30.4 km (19 mi)
- Gazetted: March 1914
- Route number(s): Metro Route 27 (1965–present) (Preston–Bundoora); A51 (2021–present) (Bundoora–Mernda); C727 (1998–present) (Mernda–Whittlesea)
- Former route number: Metro Route 27 (1965–2021) (Bundoora–South Morang); Metro Route 27 (1989–1998) (South Morang–Whittlesea); C727 (1998–2021) (South Morang–Mernda)

Major junctions
- North end: Macmeikan Street; Whittlesea, Victoria
- Wallan Road; Donnybrook Road; Bridge Inn Road; Metropolitan Ring Road; Settlement Road; Albert Street; Bell Street
- South end: High Street; Preston, Melbourne

Location(s)
- Major suburbs: Mernda, South Morang, Mill Park, Bundoora, Reservoir

Plenty Road is a major urban arterial road through the north-eastern suburbs of Melbourne, Victoria, Australia, from the inner suburb of Preston to the township of Whittlesea, just outside the north-eastern suburban fringe of Melbourne.

The road is notorious amongst Melburnians as one of the most congested and dangerous roads in Melbourne, with the section in Bundoora near the M80 Ring Road carrying upwards of 60,000 vehicles per day. The AAMI Crash Index of 2020 listed it as the worst road in Australia. Numerous upgrades have occurred on the road over the years to improve the road, with the most recent upgrades between 2019 and 2021 upgrading a significant portion of the road and reducing a number of bottlenecks.

== Route ==
Plenty Road commences at the intersection of High Street and Dundas Street in Preston and heads in a north-easterly direction as a four-lane single carriageway inner suburban road, carrying the Route 86 tram line on the roadway. At Albert Street intersection in Reservoir, it widens to a six-lane dual-carriageway road with speed limits varying between 60 km/h and 70 km/h, carrying the tram route within the median strip. Just north of the Metropolitan Ring Road interchange in Bundoora, the tram route ends at Bundoora RMIT, which also provides access to the nearby Uni Hill Shopping Centre. North of here the road continues as dual-carriageway road (as of the 2019 upgrade) through Mill Park, South Morang with a speed limit of 80 km/h until just before Mernda, where the road reduces to four lanes. North of the Bridge Inn Road intersection in Mernda, the road again reduces to a two-lane single carriageway with a speed limit of 100 km/h until it eventually terminates at the intersection with Wallan Road on the southern edge of Whittlesea.

== History ==
Within Victoria, the passing of the Country Roads Act 1912 through the Parliament of Victoria provided for the establishment of the Country Roads Board (later VicRoads) and their ability to declare Main Roads, taking responsibility for the management, construction and care of the state's major roads from local municipalities. (Main) Whittlesea Road was declared a Main Road, between Bundoora to Whittlesea on 23 March 1914, and Preston and Bundoora on 20 September 1915.

Plenty Road was signed as Metropolitan Route 27 between Preston and South Morang in 1965, then extended north all the way to Whittlesea along the entire route in 1989. With Victoria's conversion to the newer alphanumeric system in 1998, this was truncated back to the Gorge Road intersection in South Morang, with the road north of here replaced with the designation C727. In between 2019 and 2021, on the newly upgraded sections between McKimmies Road in Bundoora and Bridge Inn Road in Mernda, the road has been reassigned A51.

The passing of the Road Management Act 2004 granted the responsibility of overall management and development of Victoria's major arterial roads to VicRoads: in 2004, VicRoads re-declared the road as Plenty Valley Highway (Arterial #6140), beginning at Albert Street and Boldrewood Parade intersection at Reservoir and ending at Metropolitan Ring Road in Bundoora, while re-declaring the remnants between Reservoir and Bell Street in Preston as Whittlesea Road (Arterial #5813), and between Bundoora and the intersection of Wallan Road and Macmeikan Street in Whittlesea as Main Whittlesea Road (Arterial #5814); the section of Plenty Road between Bell and High Streets in Preston remains undeclared. Despite the declared names, the road is still presently known (and signposted) as Plenty Road along its entire length.

=== Major works ===
With the suburban growth since the late 1990s in the outer suburbs of Mill Park, South Morang and more recently Mernda, the road has become severely congested in recent years, with Plenty Road being one of the only major arterial roads in the area to a number of new estates. In the years since, the road has been progressively widened to 2 or 3 lanes each way, with the most recent upgrades in 2021 making the road a divided road all the way to Bridge Inn Road, Mernda. The Plenty Road upgrade between 2018 and 2021 upgraded a number of intersections and was completed in August 2021.

== Major intersections ==
LGA	Location	km	mi	Destinations	Notes
Whittlesea	Whittlesea	0.0	0.0	Macmeikan Street (C725 north) – Flowerdale, Yea	Northern terminus of road
Whittlesea	Whittlesea	0.0	0.0	Wallan Road (C727 west) – Wallan; Laurel Street (east) – Whittlesea	Route C727 continues west along Wallan Road
Whittlesea	Yan Yean	4.9	3.0	Donnybrook Road (C723) – Donnybrook, Mickleham	
Whittlesea	Mernda	10.0	6.2	Bridge Inn Road (Metro Route 57) – Mernda, Diamond Creek	Southern terminus of route C727, northern terminus of route A51
Whittlesea	South Morang	16.1	10.0	McDonalds Road (Metro Route 58 west) – Epping, Somerton, Bulla; Gorge Road (Metro Route 58 east) – Yarrambat, Plenty, Diamond Creek	
Whittlesea	Mill Park	18.8	11.7	Childs Road – Lalor	
Whittlesea	Mill Park–Bundoora boundary	19.8	12.3	McKimmies Road – Thomastown, Bundoora RMIT	
Whittlesea–Banyule boundary	Bundoora	20.7	12.9	Metropolitan Ring Road (M80) – Laverton North, Greensborough, Melbourne Airport	Southern terminus of route A51, northern terminus of Metro Route 27
Whittlesea–Banyule boundary	Bundoora	22.2	13.8	Settlement Road (Metro Route 48 west) – Thomastown, Broadmeadows; Bent Street (east) – Bundoora	Concurrency with Metro Route 48
Banyule–Darebin boundary	Bundoora	22.4	13.9	Grimshaw Street (Metro Route 48 east) – Greensborough, Eltham	Concurrency with Metro Route 48
Darebin	Bundoora–Kingsbury boundary	24.8	15.4	Dunne Street (west) – Reservoir; Kingsbury Drive (east) – Macleod, La Trobe University	
Darebin	Reservoir	26.8	16.7	Boldrewood Parade (Metro Route 21 north) – Reservoir; Albert Street (Metro Route 21 south) – Alphington, Kew	
Darebin	Preston	28.7	17.8	Murray Road – Coburg North, Heidelberg West	
Darebin	Preston	29.5	18.3	Bell Street (Metro Route 40) – Coburg, Heidelberg	
Darebin	Preston	30.4	18.9	Miller Street (west) – Thornbury; Dundas Street (east) – Thornbury	
Darebin	Preston	30.4	18.9	High Street (Metro Route 29 north, south) – Northcote	No right turn from Plenty Road into High Street northbound Southern terminus of road and Metro Route 27
1.000 mi = 1.609 km; 1.000 km = 0.621 mi: Concurrency terminus; Incomplete access; Route transition
