= List of railway stations in Melbourne =

List of railway stations in Melbourne may refer to:

- List of Metro Trains Melbourne railway stations
- List of V/Line railway stations
