= Results of the 2013 Australian federal election in Victoria =

2013 Australian federal election (Victoria)
← 2010	7 September 2013	2016 →

All 37 Victorian seats in the Australian House of Representatives and 6 (of the 12) seats in the Australian Senate
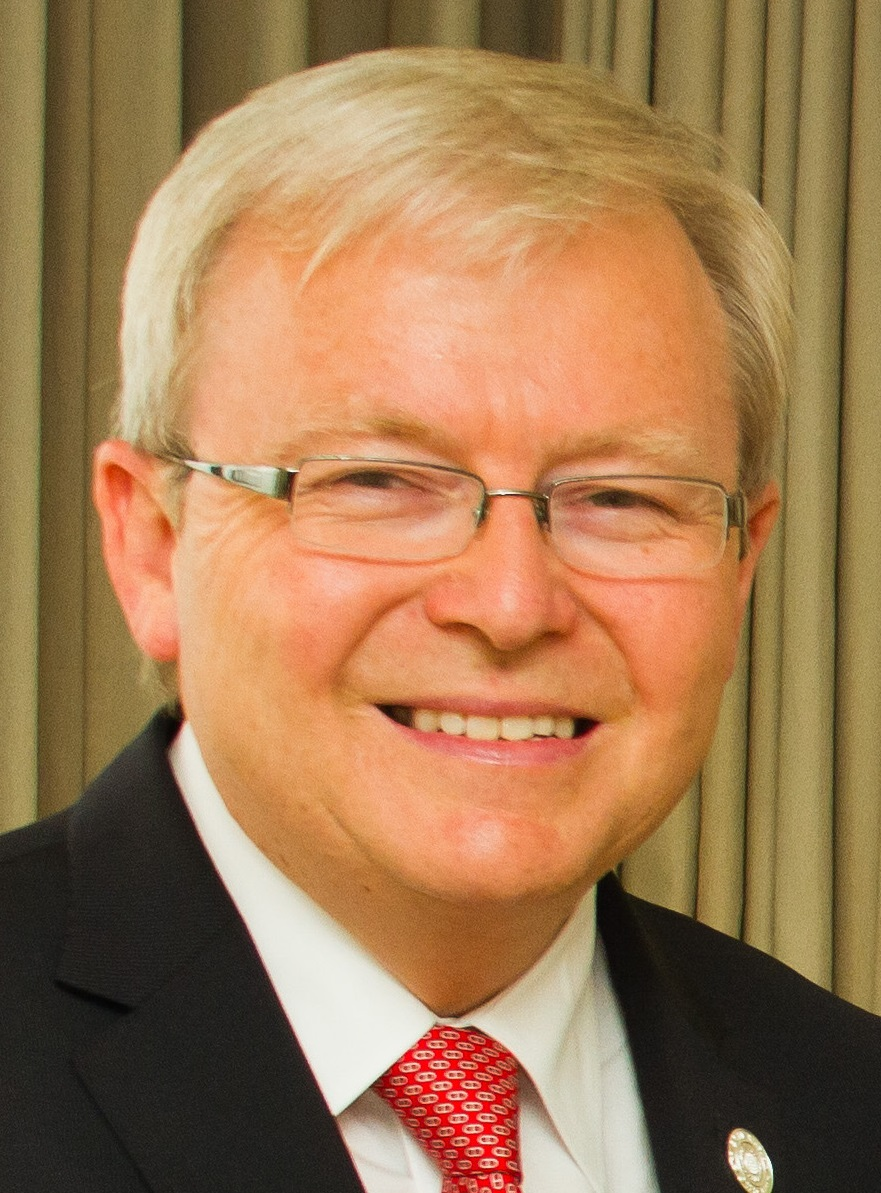

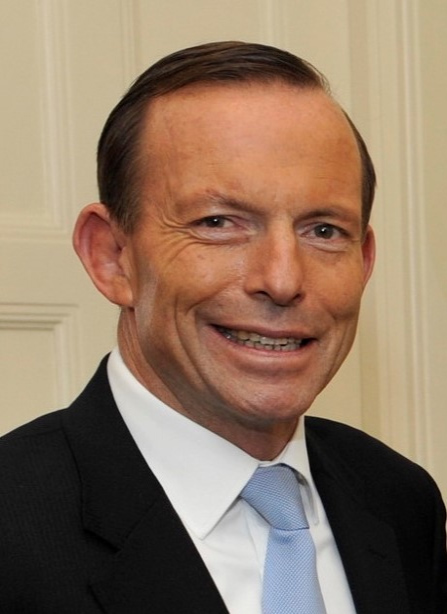

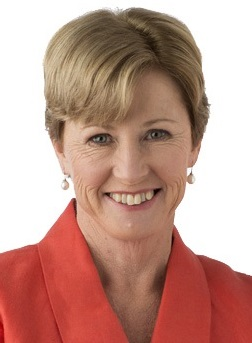
	First party	Second party	Third party
Leader	Kevin Rudd	Tony Abbott	Christine Milne
Party	Labor	Liberal/National coalition	Greens
Last election	22 seats	14 seats	1 seat
Seats won	19 seats	16 seats	1 seat
Seat change	▼3	▲2	Steady
Popular vote	1,146,894	1,406,462	355,698
Percentage	34.81%	42.69%	10.80%
Swing	▼8.00%	▲3.01%	▼1.86%
TPP	50.20%	49.80%
TPP swing	▼5.11	▲5.11
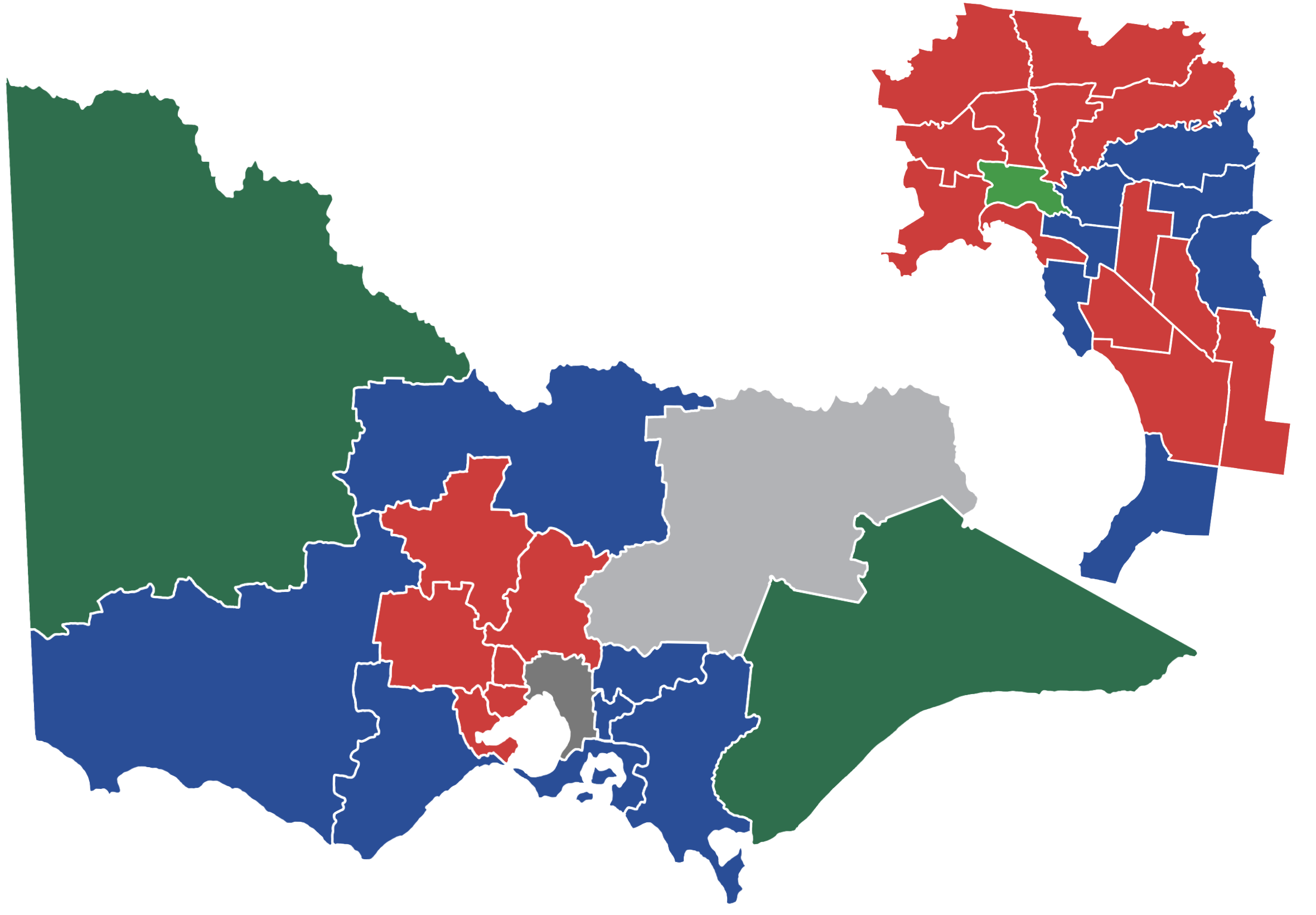
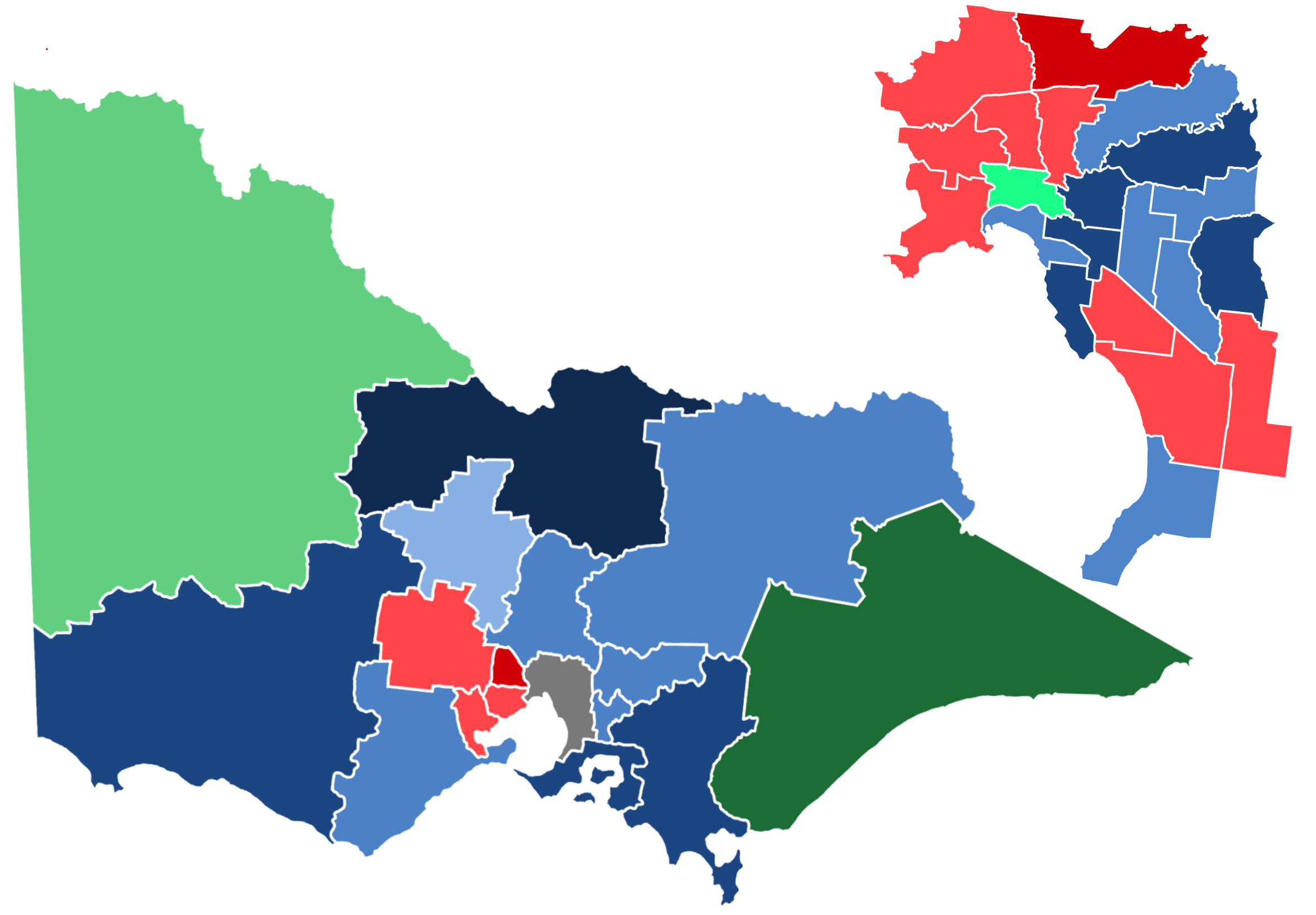
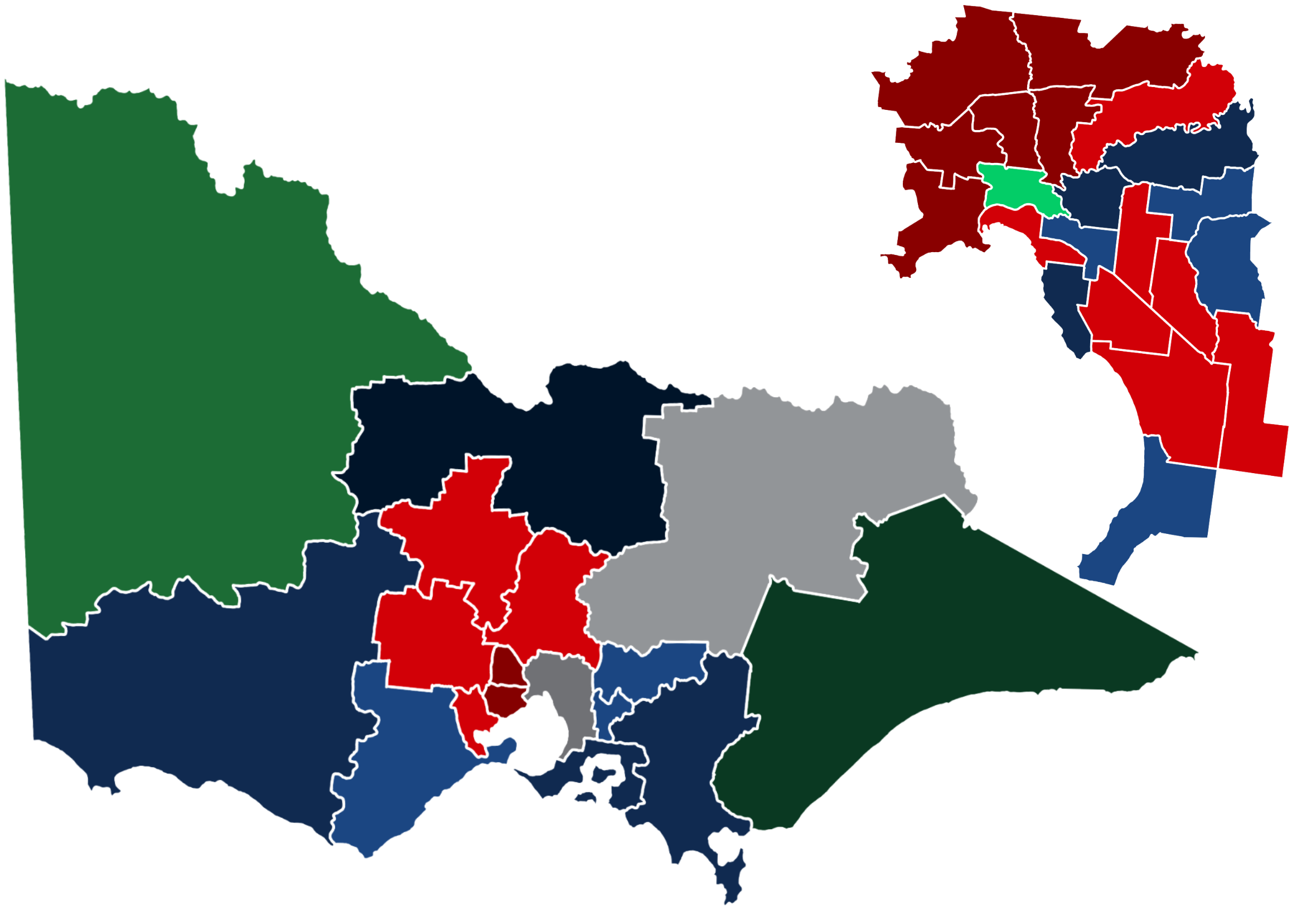

This is a list of electoral division results for the Australian 2013 federal election in the state of Victoria.

== Overall result ==
Party	Votes	%	Swing	Seats	Change
Liberal/National Coalition
Liberal Party of Australia	1,320,417	40.08	+3.63	14	▲2
National Party of Australia	86,045	2.61	–0.58	2	Steady
Coalition total	1,436,933	42.69	+3.05	16	▲2
Australian Labor Party	1,146,894	34.81	–8.00	19	▼3
Australian Greens	355,698	10.80	–1.86	1	Steady
Palmer United Party	119,623	3.63	+3.63		
Australian Sex Party	67,460	2.05	+1.86		
Family First Party	59,288	1.80	–1.34		
Rise Up Australia Party	18,124	0.55	+0.55		
Democratic Labour Party	16,714	0.51	+0.51		
Australian Christians	15,886	0.48	+0.48		
Katter's Australian Party	15,409	0.47	+0.47		
Liberal Democratic Party	4,716	0.14	–0.11		
Country Alliance	4,708	0.14	+0.14		
Animal Justice Party	1,878	0.06	+0.06		
Bullet Train for Australia	1,772	0.05	+0.05		
Socialist Alliance	1,703	0.05	–0.02		
Australian Stable Population Party	856	0.03	+0.03		
Secular Party of Australia	776	0.02	–0.14		
Citizens Electoral Council	557	0.03	−0.01		
Non-Custodial Parents Party	215	0.01	+0.01		
Australia First Party	212	0.01	+0.00		
Senator Online	209	0.01	+0.01		
Australian Independents	170	0.01	+0.01		
Australian Protectionist Party	156	0.00	+0.00		
Independents	53,307	1.62	+0.79	1	▲1
Non Affiliated	1,886	0.06	+0.04		
Total	3,294,659			37	
Two-party-preferred vote
Australian Labor Party	1,653,977	50.20	−5.11	19	▼3
Liberal/National Coalition	1,640,682	49.80	+5.11	16	▲2

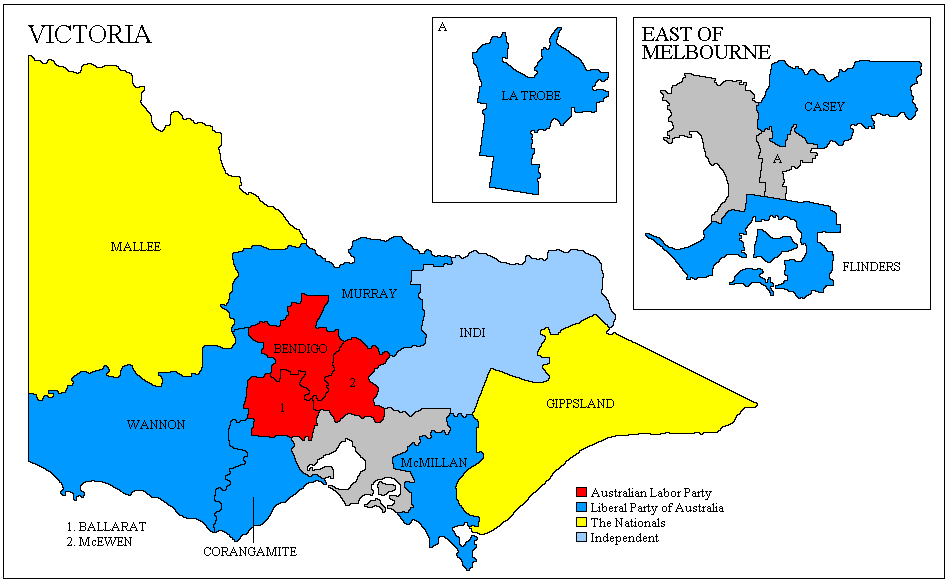
Electoral divisions: Victoria

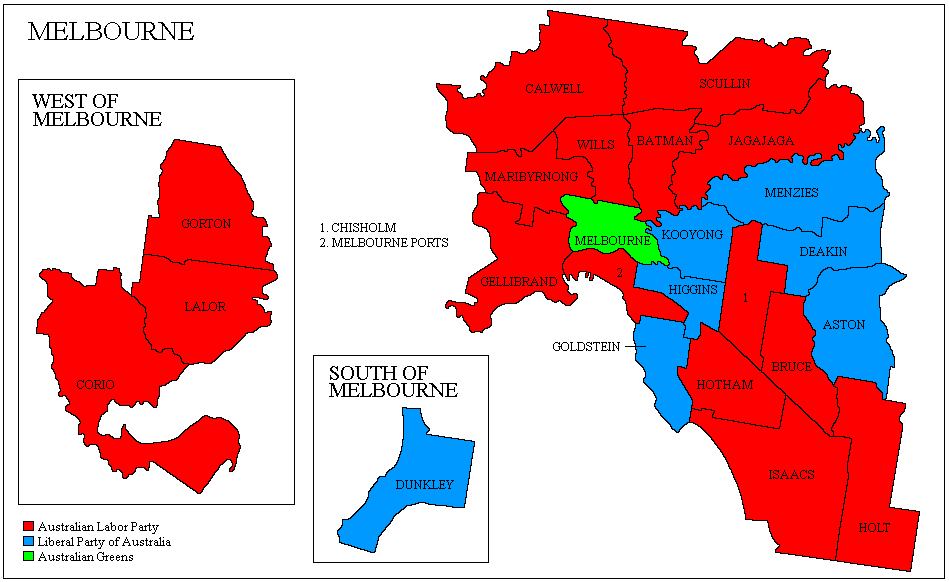
Electoral divisions: Melbourne area

== Results by division ==
=== Aston ===
2013 Australian federal election: Aston
Party	Candidate	Votes	%	±%
Liberal	Alan Tudge	44,030	51.59	+6.04
Labor	Rupert Evans	27,850	32.63	−6.71
Greens	Steve Raymond	5,017	5.88	−3.89
Palmer United	Bradley Watt	3,206	3.76	+3.76
Family First	Tony Foster	2,362	2.77	−1.89
Sex Party	Charity Jenkins	2,295	2.69	+2.15
Rise Up Australia	Jennifer Speer	581	0.68	+0.68
Total formal votes		85,341	95.47	+0.04
Informal votes		4,047	4.53	−0.04
Turnout		89,388	94.80	−0.15
Two-party-preferred result
Liberal	Alan Tudge	49,672	58.20	+7.53
Labor	Rupert Evans	35,669	41.80	−7.53
Liberal hold		Swing	+7.53	

=== Ballarat ===
2013 Australian federal election: Ballarat
Party	Candidate	Votes	%	±%
Labor	Catherine King	39,251	41.91	−9.84
Liberal	John Fitzgibbon	35,592	38.00	+4.05
Greens	Stephanie Hodgins-May	8,911	9.51	−1.83
Palmer United	Gerard Murphy	3,396	3.63	+3.63
Sex Party	Joshua Mathieson	2,135	2.28	+2.28
Christians	Anne Foster	1,139	1.22	+1.22
Family First	Shane Clark	1,139	1.22	−1.74
Democratic Labour	Stephen Vereker	1,022	1.09	+1.09
Katter's Australian	Shane Dunne	849	0.91	+0.91
Rise Up Australia	Ana Rojas	229	0.24	+0.24
Total formal votes		93,663	95.34	−0.94
Informal votes		4,578	4.66	+0.94
Turnout		98,241	94.94	+0.14
Two-party-preferred result
Labor	Catherine King	51,411	54.89	−6.81
Liberal	John Fitzgibbon	42,252	45.11	+6.81
Labor hold		Swing	−6.81	

=== Batman ===
2013 Australian federal election: Batman
Party	Candidate	Votes	%	±%
Labor	David Feeney	36,798	41.29	−10.62
Greens	Alex Bhathal	23,522	26.40	+2.65
Liberal	George Souris	20,017	22.46	+2.40
Sex Party	Lianna Sliwczynski	2,301	2.58	+2.48
Palmer United	Franco Guardiani	2,253	2.53	+2.53
Animal Justice	Rosemary Lavin	1,250	1.40	+1.40
Family First	Ken Smithies	1,126	1.26	−1.92
Rise Up Australia	Pat Winterton	1,121	1.26	+1.26
Independent Save The Planet	Philip Sutton	726	0.81	+0.81
Total formal votes		89,114	94.24	−0.74
Informal votes		5,450	5.76	+0.74
Turnout		94,564	91.59	−0.28
Notional two-party-preferred count
Labor	David Feeney	63,257	70.98	−3.82
Liberal	George Souris	25,857	29.02	+3.82
Two-candidate-preferred result
Labor	David Feeney	54,009	60.61	+2.86
Greens	Alex Bhathal	35,105	39.39	−2.86
Labor hold		Swing	+2.86	

=== Bendigo ===
2013 Australian federal election: Bendigo
Party	Candidate	Votes	%	±%
Liberal	Greg Bickley	36,701	39.67	+3.77
Labor	Lisa Chesters	33,829	36.56	−10.38
Greens	Lachlan Slade	8,600	9.30	−3.65
National	Sarah Sheedy	4,644	5.02	+5.02
Palmer United	Anita Donlon	2,336	2.52	+2.52
Sex Party	Charlie Crutchfield	2,220	2.40	+2.40
Family First	Alan Howard	1,036	1.12	−2.98
Katter's Australian	Stephen Stingel	745	0.81	+0.81
Christians	Ewan McDonald	567	0.61	+0.61
Independent	Daniel Abikhair	545	0.59	+0.59
Country Alliance	Rod Leunig	538	0.58	+0.58
Rise Up Australia	Sandra Caddy	499	0.54	+0.54
Independent	Matine Rahmani	259	0.28	+0.28
Total formal votes		92,519	94.29	−2.07
Informal votes		5,600	5.71	+2.07
Turnout		98,119	95.32	+0.25
Two-party-preferred result
Labor	Lisa Chesters	47,426	51.26	−8.16
Liberal	Greg Bickley	45,093	48.74	+8.16
Labor hold		Swing	−8.16	

=== Bruce ===
2013 Australian federal election: Bruce
Party	Candidate	Votes	%	±%
Liberal	Emanuele Cicchiello	35,501	42.96	+5.24
Labor	Alan Griffin	34,626	41.90	−6.81
Greens	Lynette Keleher	5,491	6.64	−2.83
Family First	Rebecca Filliponi	2,186	2.65	−1.39
Palmer United	Paul Tuyau	2,173	2.63	+2.63
Democratic Labour	Geraldine Gonsalvez	1,334	1.61	+1.61
Independent	Kiry Uth	682	0.83	+0.83
Rise Up Australia	Robert White	652	0.79	+0.79
Total formal votes		82,645	94.50	−0.42
Informal votes		4,810	5.50	+0.42
Turnout		87,455	92.24	−0.18
Two-party-preferred result
Labor	Alan Griffin	42,812	51.80	−5.91
Liberal	Emanuele Cicchiello	39,833	48.20	+5.91
Labor hold		Swing	−5.91	

=== Calwell ===
2013 Australian federal election: Calwell
Party	Candidate	Votes	%	±%
Labor	Maria Vamvakinou	42,819	49.81	−7.80
Liberal	Ali Khan	24,490	28.49	+2.97
Greens	Joanna Nevill	4,632	5.39	−5.80
Palmer United	Bryce Letcher	3,728	4.34	+4.34
Sex Party	Nevena Spirovska	2,367	2.75	+2.75
Family First	Paul Graham	2,175	2.53	−2.15
Christians	Maria Bengtsson	2,121	2.47	+2.47
Katter's Australian	Brett Watson	1,915	2.23	+2.23
Democratic Labour	Omar Jabir	1,310	1.52	+1.52
Rise Up Australia	Charles Rozario	415	0.48	+0.48
Total formal votes		85,972	92.08	−0.91
Informal votes		7,398	7.92	+0.91
Turnout		93,370	90.93	−1.23
Two-party-preferred result
Labor	Maria Vamvakinou	54,906	63.86	−6.20
Liberal	Ali Khan	31,066	36.14	+6.20
Labor hold		Swing	−6.20	

=== Casey ===
2013 Australian federal election: Casey
Party	Candidate	Votes	%	±%
Liberal	Tony Smith	43,538	49.18	+3.06
Labor	Cathy Farrell	24,651	27.85	−8.71
Greens	Steve Meacher	9,641	10.89	−1.26
Palmer United	Milton Wilde	4,413	4.98	+4.98
Family First	Gary Coombes	2,370	2.68	−2.10
Independent	Jeanette McRae	1,358	1.53	+1.53
Christians	Mike Brown	1,126	1.27	+1.27
Country Alliance	Jeffrey Leake	986	1.11	+1.11
Rise Up Australia	Paul Barbieri	446	0.50	+0.50
Total formal votes		88,529	95.38	−0.23
Informal votes		4,291	4.62	+0.23
Turnout		92,820	95.00	+0.52
Two-party-preferred result
Liberal	Tony Smith	50,615	57.17	+5.31
Labor	Cathy Farrell	37,914	42.83	−5.31
Liberal hold		Swing	+5.31	

=== Chisholm ===
2013 Australian federal election: Chisholm
Party	Candidate	Votes	%	±%
Liberal	John Nguyen	37,990	44.12	+3.90
Labor	Anna Burke	34,015	39.50	−4.75
Greens	Josh Fergeus	8,133	9.45	−2.44
Sex Party	Luzio Grossi	1,762	2.05	+2.05
Palmer United	Brian Woods	1,405	1.63	+1.63
Family First	Martin Myszka	949	1.10	−1.56
Democratic Labour	Pat Shea	860	1.00	+1.00
Rise Up Australia	Melanie Vassiliou	650	0.75	+0.75
Secular	Vidura Jayaratne	345	0.40	−0.20
Total formal votes		86,109	95.77	−0.55
Informal votes		3,802	4.23	+0.55
Turnout		89,911	93.41	−0.28
Two-party-preferred result
Labor	Anna Burke	44,431	51.60	−4.18
Liberal	John Nguyen	41,678	48.40	+4.18
Labor hold		Swing	−4.18	

=== Corangamite ===
2013 Australian federal election: Corangamite
Party	Candidate	Votes	%	±%
Liberal	Sarah Henderson	44,778	48.25	+3.15
Labor	Darren Cheeseman	29,728	32.03	−7.29
Greens	Lloyd Davies	11,007	11.86	+0.34
Palmer United	Buddy Rojek	2,026	2.18	+2.18
Sex Party	Jayden Millard	1,726	1.86	+1.86
Family First	Peter Wray	908	0.98	−0.99
Independent	Adrian Whitehead	694	0.75	+0.75
National	Andrew Black	598	0.64	+0.64
Christians	Alan Barron	499	0.54	+0.54
Country Alliance	Warren Jackman	408	0.44	+0.44
Rise Up Australia	Helen Rashleigh	273	0.29	+0.29
Protectionist	Nick Steel	156	0.17	+0.17
Total formal votes		92,801	95.57	−1.24
Informal votes		4,304	4.43	+1.24
Turnout		97,105	95.46	+0.56
Two-party-preferred result
Liberal	Sarah Henderson	50,057	53.94	+4.22
Labor	Darren Cheeseman	42,744	46.06	−4.22
Liberal gain from Labor		Swing	+4.22	

=== Corio ===
2013 Australian federal election: Corio
Party	Candidate	Votes	%	±%
Labor	Richard Marles	39,267	43.51	−7.44
Liberal	Peter Read	31,768	35.20	+3.31
Greens	Greg Lacey	6,593	7.31	−5.06
Palmer United	Anthony Harrington	5,122	5.68	+5.68
Sex Party	Justine Martin	2,492	2.76	+2.76
Independent	Stephanie Asher	1,958	2.17	+2.17
Family First	Brendan Fenn	1,461	1.62	−1.94
Socialist Alliance	Sue Bull	679	0.75	−0.35
Christians	Patrick Atherton	549	0.61	+0.61
Rise Up Australia	Yann Legrand	364	0.40	+0.40
Total formal votes		90,253	94.70	−0.84
Informal votes		5,049	5.30	+0.84
Turnout		95,302	94.21	+0.13
Two-party-preferred result
Labor	Richard Marles	52,117	57.75	−5.72
Liberal	Peter Read	38,136	42.25	+5.72
Labor hold		Swing	−5.72	

=== Deakin ===
2013 Australian federal election: Deakin
Party	Candidate	Votes	%	±%
Liberal	Michael Sukkar	40,482	45.88	+2.01
Labor	Mike Symon	28,883	32.73	−5.65
Greens	Brendan Powell	9,560	10.83	−1.93
Palmer United	Mario Guardiani	1,949	2.21	+2.21
Sex Party	Stephen Barber	1,856	2.10	+2.10
Christians	Ian Dobby	1,698	1.92	+1.92
Independent	Mike Barclay	1,519	1.72	+1.72
Family First	Hannah Westbrook	1,200	1.36	−2.14
Rise Up Australia	Yasmin De Zilwa	327	0.37	+0.37
Katter's Australian	Steve Raskovy	293	0.33	+0.33
Country Alliance	Toni Smith	261	0.30	+0.30
Australia First	John Carbonari	212	0.24	−0.04
Total formal votes		88,240	95.67	−0.80
Informal votes		3,989	4.33	+0.80
Turnout		92,229	94.76	0.00
Two-party-preferred result
Liberal	Michael Sukkar	46,926	53.18	+3.78
Labor	Mike Symon	41,314	46.82	−3.78
Liberal gain from Labor		Swing	+3.78	

=== Dunkley ===
2013 Australian federal election: Dunkley
Party	Candidate	Votes	%	±%
Liberal	Bruce Billson	42,869	48.75	+1.42
Labor	Sonya Kilkenny	27,155	30.88	−7.44
Greens	Simon Tiller	8,199	9.32	−2.37
Palmer United	Kate Ryder	3,707	4.22	+4.22
Sex Party	Eloise Palmi	2,589	2.94	+2.94
Family First	Cameron Eastman	1,682	1.91	−0.75
Independent	Rod Burt	740	0.84	+0.84
Independent	Roy Broff	516	0.59	+0.59
Rise Up Australia	Yvonne Gentle	477	0.54	+0.54
Total formal votes		87,934	95.21	−0.87
Informal votes		4,424	4.79	+0.87
Turnout		92,358	93.28	−0.32
Two-party-preferred result
Liberal	Bruce Billson	48,861	55.57	+4.53
Labor	Sonya Kilkenny	39,073	44.43	−4.53
Liberal hold		Swing	+4.53	

=== Flinders ===
2013 Australian federal election: Flinders
Party	Candidate	Votes	%	±%
Liberal	Greg Hunt	51,972	55.34	+1.01
Labor	Joshua Sinclair	23,666	25.20	−6.54
Greens	Martin Rush	9,148	9.74	−1.76
Palmer United	Linda Clark	5,639	6.00	+6.00
Family First	David Clark	1,091	1.16	−1.26
Independent	Paul Madigan	708	0.75	+0.75
Christians	Ashleigh Belsar	523	0.56	+0.56
Rise Up Australia	Angela Dorian	481	0.51	+0.51
Independent	Denis McCormack	478	0.51	+0.51
Non-Custodial Parents	John Zabaneh	215	0.23	+0.23
Total formal votes		93,921	95.03	−0.85
Informal votes		4,916	4.97	+0.85
Turnout		98,837	93.79	+0.54
Two-party-preferred result
Liberal	Greg Hunt	58,048	61.81	+2.67
Labor	Joshua Sinclair	35,873	38.19	−2.67
Liberal hold		Swing	+2.67	

=== Gellibrand ===
2013 Australian federal election: Gellibrand
Party	Candidate	Votes	%	±%
Labor	Tim Watts	40,236	46.04	−12.90
Liberal	David McConnell	23,343	26.71	+4.29
Greens	Rod Swift	14,623	16.73	+1.50
Palmer United	Dwayne Singleton	3,413	3.91	+3.91
Sex Party	Allan Cashion	2,540	2.91	+2.91
Family First	Kerry Arch	2,266	2.59	+0.21
Christians	Anthony O'Neill	967	1.11	+1.11
Total formal votes		87,388	94.38	−0.29
Informal votes		5,202	5.62	+0.29
Turnout		92,590	90.65	−0.91
Two-party-preferred result
Labor	Tim Watts	58,139	66.53	−7.60
Liberal	David McConnell	29,249	33.47	+7.60
Labor hold		Swing	−7.60	

=== Gippsland ===
2013 Australian federal election: Gippsland
Party	Candidate	Votes	%	±%
National	Darren Chester	47,533	53.76	+0.76
Labor	Jeff McNeill	20,467	23.15	−8.42
Greens	Scott Campbell-Smith	5,039	5.70	−0.87
Liberal Democrats	Ben Buckley	4,716	5.33	−0.19
Palmer United	Deborah Gravenall	3,785	4.28	+4.28
Sex Party	Douglas Leitch	2,101	2.38	+2.38
Independent	Peter Gardner	1,992	2.25	+2.25
Family First	Angie Foster	1,591	1.80	−1.54
Country Alliance	Sav Mangion	623	0.70	+0.70
Rise Up Australia	Peter Dorian	367	0.42	+0.42
Secular	Mark Guerin	201	0.23	+0.23
Total formal votes		88,415	94.01	−2.20
Informal votes		5,629	5.99	+2.20
Turnout		94,044	94.49	+0.24
Two-party-preferred result
National	Darren Chester	58,214	65.84	+4.39
Labor	Jeff McNeill	30,201	34.16	−4.39
National hold		Swing	+4.39	

=== Goldstein ===
2013 Australian federal election: Goldstein
Party	Candidate	Votes	%	±%
Liberal	Andrew Robb	51,193	56.51	+4.42
Labor	Daniel Guttmann	21,591	23.83	−6.36
Greens	Rose Read	14,408	15.90	−0.30
Palmer United	Keith Ryder	2,044	2.26	+2.26
Family First	Ian Joyner	751	0.83	−0.50
Rise Up Australia	Lynette Hannie	604	0.67	+0.67
Total formal votes		90,591	96.67	−0.19
Informal votes		3,121	3.33	+0.19
Turnout		93,712	93.20	+0.07
Two-party-preferred result
Liberal	Andrew Robb	55,288	61.03	+5.02
Labor	Daniel Guttmann	35,303	38.97	−5.02
Liberal hold		Swing	+5.02	

=== Gorton ===
2013 Australian federal election: Gorton
Party	Candidate	Votes	%	±%
Labor	Brendan O'Connor	44,449	50.73	−12.12
Liberal	Phil Humphreys	22,328	25.48	+3.40
Greens	Dinesh Jayasuriya	5,597	6.39	−2.58
Palmer United	Anthony Barnes	5,238	5.98	+5.98
Sex Party	Rhiannon Hunter	2,850	3.25	+3.25
Family First	Scott Amberley	2,538	2.90	−2.11
Democratic Labour	Michael Deverala	2,392	2.73	+2.73
Christians	Mabor Chadhuol	1,132	1.29	+1.29
Katter's Australian	Graham Macardy	1,090	1.24	+1.24
Total formal votes		87,614	92.89	−0.18
Informal votes		6,706	7.11	+0.18
Turnout		94,320	92.23	+0.30
Two-party-preferred result
Labor	Brendan O'Connor	57,933	66.12	−7.51
Liberal	Phil Humphreys	29,681	33.88	+7.51
Labor hold		Swing	−7.51	

=== Higgins ===
2013 Australian federal election: Higgins
Party	Candidate	Votes	%	±%
Liberal	Kelly O'Dwyer	47,467	54.37	+3.89
Labor	Wesa Chau	21,027	24.08	−5.22
Greens	James Harrison	14,669	16.80	−0.97
Independent	Graeme Weber	1,663	1.90	+1.90
Palmer United	Phillip Dall	1,385	1.59	+1.59
Family First	Jamie Baldwin	742	0.85	−0.19
Rise Up Australia	Leanne Price	354	0.41	+0.41
Total formal votes		87,307	96.42	−0.68
Informal votes		3,239	3.58	+0.68
Turnout		90,546	91.97	−1.89
Two-party-preferred result
Liberal	Kelly O'Dwyer	52,323	59.93	+4.53
Labor	Wesa Chau	34,984	40.07	−4.53
Liberal hold		Swing	+4.53	

=== Holt ===
2013 Australian federal election: Holt
Party	Candidate	Votes	%	±%
Labor	Anthony Byrne	43,096	48.19	−6.92
Liberal	Ricardo Balancy	29,181	32.63	+2.72
Palmer United	Jatinder Singh	4,931	5.51	+5.51
Greens	Jackie McCullough	3,469	3.88	−5.32
Sex Party	Lachlan Smith	2,514	2.81	+2.81
Family First	Pam Keenan	2,232	2.50	−2.46
Democratic Labour	Michael Palma	1,835	2.05	+2.05
Christians	Vivian Hill	1,232	1.38	+1.38
Rise Up Australia	Jonathan Eli	933	1.04	+1.04
Total formal votes		89,423	93.92	−0.24
Informal votes		5,789	6.08	+0.24
Turnout		95,212	92.81	+0.65
Two-party-preferred result
Labor	Anthony Byrne	52,836	59.09	−4.88
Liberal	Ricardo Balancy	36,587	40.91	+4.88
Labor hold		Swing	−4.88	

=== Hotham ===
2013 Australian federal election: Hotham
Party	Candidate	Votes	%	±%
Labor	Clare O'Neil	40,512	47.13	−7.22
Liberal	Fazal Cader	31,929	37.14	+4.79
Greens	Lorna Wyatt	7,327	8.52	−1.64
Palmer United	Samuel Porter	2,981	3.47	+3.47
Family First	Stephen Nowland	1,818	2.11	−0.25
Rise Up Australia	Peter Vassiliou	1,392	1.62	+1.62
Total formal votes		85,959	95.17	−0.35
Informal votes		4,365	4.83	+0.35
Turnout		90,324	92.53	−0.56
Two-party-preferred result
Labor	Clare O'Neil	49,232	57.27	−6.69
Liberal	Fazal Cader	36,727	42.73	+6.69
Labor hold		Swing	−6.69	

=== Indi ===
2013 Australian federal election: Indi
Party	Candidate	Votes	%	±%
Liberal	Sophie Mirabella	39,785	44.68	−7.17
Independent	Cathy McGowan	27,763	31.18	+31.18
Labor	Robyn Walsh	10,375	11.65	−16.54
Greens	Jenny O'Connor	3,041	3.42	−6.21
Palmer United	Robert Murphy	2,417	2.71	+2.71
Sex Party	Helma Aschenbrenner	1,402	1.57	+1.57
Family First	Rick Leeworthy	1,330	1.49	−2.24
Rise Up Australia	Robert Dudley	985	1.11	+1.11
Independent	Jennifer Podesta	841	0.94	+0.94
Katter's Australian	Phil Rourke	615	0.69	+0.69
Bullet Train	William Hayes	489	0.55	+0.55
Total formal votes		89,043	94.91	−1.18
Informal votes		4,774	5.09	+1.18
Turnout		93,817	95.17	+0.56
Notional two-party-preferred count
Liberal	Sophie Mirabella	52,625	59.10	+0.11
Labor	Robyn Walsh	36,418	40.90	−0.11
Two-candidate-preferred result
Independent	Cathy McGowan	44,741	50.25	+50.25
Liberal	Sophie Mirabella	44,302	49.75	−10.17
Independent gain from Liberal		Swing	N/A	

=== Isaacs ===
2013 Australian federal election: Isaacs
Party	Candidate	Votes	%	±%
Labor	Mark Dreyfus	35,837	41.33	−7.55
Liberal	Garry Spencer	34,864	40.21	+5.12
Greens	Sandra Miles	6,120	7.06	−3.84
Palmer United	Avtar Gill	2,846	3.28	+3.28
Family First	John Elliott	2,503	2.89	−0.76
Sex Party	Laith Graham	2,093	2.41	+2.41
Democratic Labour	James Leach	1,144	1.32	+1.32
Christians	Karen Dobby	743	0.86	+0.86
Rise Up Australia	Nadia Seaman	558	0.64	+0.64
Total formal votes		86,708	95.20	−0.09
Informal votes		4,375	4.80	+0.09
Turnout		91,083	93.01	+0.09
Two-party-preferred result
Labor	Mark Dreyfus	46,704	53.86	−6.55
Liberal	Garry Spencer	40,004	46.14	+6.55
Labor hold		Swing	−6.55	

=== Jagajaga ===
2013 Australian federal election: Jagajaga
Party	Candidate	Votes	%	±%
Liberal	Nick McGowan	38,422	41.94	+7.01
Labor	Jenny Macklin	34,813	38.00	−9.00
Greens	Chris Kearney	11,863	12.95	−1.92
Sex Party	Nicholas Wallis	2,565	2.80	+2.80
Palmer United	Kitten Snape	2,452	2.68	+2.68
Family First	Tahlia Eadie	1,490	1.63	−0.86
Total formal votes		91,605	96.27	+0.24
Informal votes		3,549	3.73	−0.24
Turnout		95,154	94.06	−0.26
Two-party-preferred result
Labor	Jenny Macklin	48,669	53.13	−8.02
Liberal	Nick McGowan	42,936	46.87	+8.02
Labor hold		Swing	−8.02	

=== Kooyong ===
2013 Australian federal election: Kooyong
Party	Candidate	Votes	%	±%
Liberal	Josh Frydenberg	48,802	55.69	+3.20
Labor	John Kennedy	19,655	22.43	−5.12
Greens	Helen McLeod	14,526	16.58	−1.76
Independent	Tiffany Harrison	1,464	1.67	+1.67
Palmer United	Luke McNamara	1,406	1.60	+1.60
Family First	Jaxon Calder	825	0.94	−0.60
Independent	Angelina Zubac	621	0.71	+0.71
Rise Up Australia	Tim Kriedemann	327	0.37	+0.37
Total formal votes		87,626	96.61	−0.61
Informal votes		3,073	3.39	+0.61
Turnout		90,699	93.38	−0.19
Two-party-preferred result
Liberal	Josh Frydenberg	53,504	61.06	+3.61
Labor	John Kennedy	34,122	38.94	−3.61
Liberal hold		Swing	+3.61	

=== La Trobe ===
2013 Australian federal election: La Trobe
Party	Candidate	Votes	%	±%
Liberal	Jason Wood	40,925	46.05	+3.01
Labor	Laura Smyth	28,488	32.06	−7.35
Greens	Michael Schilling	8,905	10.02	−1.98
Palmer United	Jason Kennedy	4,514	5.08	+5.08
Sex Party	Martin Leahy	2,475	2.79	+0.46
Family First	Daniel Martin	1,680	1.89	−0.68
Democratic Labour	Rachel Jenkins	1,168	1.31	+1.31
Rise Up Australia	Kevin Seaman	711	0.80	+0.80
Total formal votes		88,866	95.61	−0.35
Informal votes		4,083	4.39	+0.35
Turnout		92,949	94.84	+0.41
Two-party-preferred result
Liberal	Jason Wood	47,998	54.01	+5.67
Labor	Laura Smyth	40,868	45.99	−5.67
Liberal gain from Labor		Swing	+5.67	

=== Lalor ===
2013 Australian federal election: Lalor
Party	Candidate	Votes	%	±%
Labor	Joanne Ryan	42,184	45.17	−18.78
Liberal	Nihal Samara	27,321	29.26	+6.13
Greens	Beck Sheffield-Brotherton	5,615	6.01	−1.14
Palmer United	Joe Zappia	5,416	5.80	+5.80
Sex Party	Angel Harwood	3,004	3.22	+3.22
Family First	Daryl Pollard	2,653	2.84	−0.07
Independent	Nathan Mullins	1,842	1.97	+1.97
Democratic Labour	Michael Freeman	1,768	1.89	+1.89
Rise Up Australia	Marion Vale	1,684	1.80	+1.80
Christians	Geoff Rogers	1,535	1.64	+1.64
Stable Population	Jonathan Page	359	0.38	+0.38
Total formal votes		93,381	93.37	−0.88
Informal votes		6,630	6.63	+0.88
Turnout		100,011	93.12	+0.23
Two-party-preferred result
Labor	Joanne Ryan	58,041	62.16	−9.96
Liberal	Nihal Samara	35,340	37.84	+9.96
Labor hold		Swing	−9.96	

=== Mallee ===
2013 Australian federal election: Mallee
Party	Candidate	Votes	%	±%
National	Andrew Broad	33,270	38.76	−23.82
Liberal	Chris Crewther	23,363	27.22	+24.12
Labor	Lydia Senior	15,020	17.50	−3.33
Katter's Australian	Vince Cirillo	3,195	3.72	+3.72
Palmer United	Mark Cory	2,883	3.36	+3.36
Greens	Jane Macallister	2,637	3.07	−4.67
Sex Party	Amy Mulcahy	2,118	2.47	+2.47
Family First	Neil Buller	1,356	1.58	−3.67
Rise Up Australia	Tim Middleton	772	0.90	+0.90
Independent	Allen Ridgeway	595	0.69	+0.69
Country Alliance	Michael Coldham	384	0.45	+0.45
Citizens Electoral Council	Chris Lahy	241	0.28	+0.28
Total formal votes		85,834	93.09	−2.53
Informal votes		6,373	6.91	+2.53
Turnout		92,207	94.70	+0.25
Notional two-party-preferred count
National	Andrew Broad	63,224	73.66	+0.40
Labor	Lydia Senior	22,610	26.34	−0.40
Two-candidate-preferred result
National	Andrew Broad	48,243	56.21	−15.20
Liberal	Chris Crewther	37,591	43.79	+43.79
National hold		Swing	N/A	

=== Maribyrnong ===
2013 Australian federal election: Maribyrnong
Party	Candidate	Votes	%	±%
Labor	Bill Shorten	43,162	47.90	−7.67
Liberal	Ted Hatzakortzian	29,767	33.03	+4.44
Greens	Richard Keech	8,920	9.90	−2.01
Palmer United	Philip Cutler	2,470	2.74	+2.74
Sex Party	Amy Myers	2,313	2.57	+2.57
Democratic Labour	Marguerita Kavanagh	1,258	1.40	+1.40
Family First	Hayleigh Carlson	944	1.05	−1.81
Christians	Joe Paterno	888	0.99	+0.99
Rise Up Australia	Jeff Truscott	395	0.44	+0.44
Total formal votes		90,117	93.82	−0.56
Informal votes		5,940	6.18	+0.56
Turnout		96,057	91.56	−0.08
Two-party-preferred result
Labor	Bill Shorten	55,320	61.39	−6.10
Liberal	Ted Hatzakortzian	34,797	38.61	+6.10
Labor hold		Swing	−6.10	

=== McEwen ===
2013 Australian federal election: McEwen
Party	Candidate	Votes	%	±%
Liberal	Donna Petrovich	40,853	40.34	+4.11
Labor	Rob Mitchell	38,091	37.62	−10.19
Greens	Neil Barker	7,187	7.10	−3.59
Palmer United	Trevor Dance	6,822	6.74	+6.74
Sex Party	Victoria Nash	3,256	3.22	+3.22
Family First	Barry Newton	2,906	2.87	−0.87
Katter's Australian	Bruce Stevens	997	0.98	+0.98
Country Alliance	Ian Cranson	686	0.68	+0.68
Rise Up Australia	Ferdie Verdan	463	0.46	+0.46
Total formal votes		101,261	95.38	+0.21
Informal votes		4,910	4.62	−0.21
Turnout		106,171	94.83	−1.81
Two-party-preferred result
Labor	Rob Mitchell	50,787	50.15	−9.04
Liberal	Donna Petrovich	50,474	49.85	+9.04
Labor hold		Swing	−9.04	

=== McMillan ===
2013 Australian federal election: McMillan
Party	Candidate	Votes	%	±%
Liberal	Russell Broadbent	47,316	50.36	+1.31
Labor	Anthony Naus	23,537	25.05	−10.71
Greens	Malcolm McKelvie	7,157	7.62	−2.09
Palmer United	Matthew Sherry	4,380	4.66	+4.66
Katter's Australian	David Amor	2,262	2.41	+2.41
Sex Party	Benjamin Staggard	2,168	2.31	+2.20
Family First	Luke Conlon	1,893	2.01	−1.24
Democratic Labour	Andrew Kis-Rigo	1,641	1.75	+1.75
Independent	John Parker	1,245	1.33	+1.33
Country Alliance	Ross Fisher	822	0.87	+0.87
Independent	Leigh Gatt	695	0.74	−1.35
Rise Up Australia	Norman Baker	627	0.67	+0.67
Senator Online	Gary Patton	209	0.22	+0.22
Total formal votes		93,952	93.89	−2.15
Informal votes		6,118	6.11	+2.15
Turnout		100,070	94.64	+0.34
Two-party-preferred result
Liberal	Russell Broadbent	58,095	61.83	+7.62
Labor	Anthony Naus	35,857	38.17	−7.62
Liberal hold		Swing	+7.62	

=== Melbourne ===
2013 Australian federal election: Melbourne
Party	Candidate	Votes	%	±%
Greens	Adam Bandt	36,035	42.62	+7.03
Labor	Cath Bowtell	22,490	26.60	−11.54
Liberal	Sean Armistead	19,301	22.83	+1.37
Sex Party	James Mangisi	1,621	1.92	+0.06
Independent Socialist	Anthony Main	1,140	1.35	+1.35
Palmer United	Martin Vrbnjak	780	0.92	+0.92
Animal Justice	Nyree Walshe	628	0.74	+0.74
Family First	Noelle Walker	453	0.54	−1.03
Independent	Kate Borland	443	0.52	+0.52
Democratic Labour	Michael Murphy	442	0.52	+0.52
Bullet Train	Josh Davidson	297	0.35	+0.35
Secular	Royston Wilding	230	0.27	−0.43
Independent	Frazer Kirkman	183	0.22	+0.22
Stable Population	Michael Bayliss	173	0.20	+0.20
Australian Independents	Paul Cummins	170	0.20	+0.20
Rise Up Australia	Joyce Khoo	165	0.20	+0.20
Total formal votes		84,551	94.05	−2.28
Informal votes		5,348	5.95	+2.28
Turnout		89,899	90.80	+0.71
Notional two-party-preferred count
Labor	Cath Bowtell	58,555	69.25	−3.52
Liberal	Sean Armistead	25,996	30.75	+3.52
Two-candidate-preferred result
Greens	Adam Bandt	46,732	55.27	−0.64
Labor	Cath Bowtell	37,819	44.73	+0.64
Greens hold		Swing	−0.64	

=== Melbourne Ports ===
2013 Australian federal election: Melbourne Ports
Party	Candidate	Votes	%	±%
Liberal	Kevin Ekendahl	33,278	41.05	+3.66
Labor	Michael Danby	25,676	31.67	−6.56
Greens	Ann Birrell	16,353	20.17	−0.82
Sex Party	Melissa Star	3,089	3.81	+1.59
Palmer United	Toby Stodart	1,122	1.38	+1.38
Democratic Labour	Vince Stefano	540	0.67	+0.67
Family First	Robert Keenan	490	0.60	−0.14
Stable Population	Steven Armstrong	324	0.40	+0.40
Rise Up Australia	Margaret Quinn	201	0.25	+0.25
Total formal votes		81,073	96.18	−0.59
Informal votes		3,223	3.82	+0.59
Turnout		84,296	90.14	+0.61
Two-party-preferred result
Labor	Michael Danby	43,419	53.56	−4.33
Liberal	Kevin Ekendahl	37,654	46.44	+4.33
Labor hold		Swing	−4.33	

=== Menzies ===
2013 Australian federal election: Menzies
Party	Candidate	Votes	%	±%
Liberal	Kevin Andrews	52,290	58.88	+5.33
Labor	Manoj Kumar	22,788	25.66	−6.52
Greens	Richard Cranston	7,663	8.63	−2.09
Palmer United	Agostino Guardiani	2,353	2.65	+2.65
Family First	Andrew Conlon	1,917	2.16	−1.39
Independent	Ramon Robinson	1,287	1.45	+1.45
Rise Up Australia	Phil Baker	508	0.57	+0.57
Total formal votes		88,806	95.70	−0.20
Informal votes		3,987	4.30	+0.20
Turnout		92,793	94.13	−0.06
Two-party-preferred result
Liberal	Kevin Andrews	57,235	64.45	+5.80
Labor	Manoj Kumar	31,571	35.55	−5.80
Liberal hold		Swing	+5.80	

=== Murray ===
2013 Australian federal election: Murray
Party	Candidate	Votes	%	±%
Liberal	Sharman Stone	54,490	61.41	−2.78
Labor	Rod Higgins	18,403	20.74	−3.07
Greens	Damien Stevens	3,485	3.93	−2.40
Palmer United	Catriona Thoolen	2,964	3.34	+3.34
Katter's Australian	Michael Bourke	2,423	2.73	+2.73
Sex Party	Tristram Chellew	2,337	2.63	+2.63
Family First	Alan Walker	1,589	1.79	−1.79
Independent	Wendy Buck	1,176	1.33	+1.33
Bullet Train	Fern Summer	986	1.11	+1.11
Rise Up Australia	Raymond Hungerford	563	0.63	+0.63
Citizens Electoral Council	Jeff Davy	316	0.36	−0.20
Total formal votes		88,732	93.67	−0.62
Informal votes		5,992	6.33	+0.62
Turnout		94,724	94.60	+0.06
Two-party-preferred result
Liberal	Sharman Stone	62,882	70.87	+1.29
Labor	Rod Higgins	25,850	29.13	−1.29
Liberal hold		Swing	+1.29	

=== Scullin ===
2013 Australian federal election: Scullin
Party	Candidate	Votes	%	±%
Labor	Andrew Giles	45,484	50.26	−9.55
Liberal	Jag Chugha	26,369	29.14	+3.47
Greens	Rose Ljubicic	6,780	7.49	−1.70
Palmer United	Peter Cooper	5,991	6.62	+6.62
Sex Party	Nathan Rolph	2,453	2.71	+2.71
Family First	Katie Conlon	2,394	2.65	−2.43
Katter's Australian	Domenic Greco	1,025	1.13	+1.13
Total formal votes		90,496	93.57	−0.71
Informal votes		6,214	6.43	+0.71
Turnout		96,710	93.26	−0.92
Two-party-preferred result
Labor	Andrew Giles	58,232	64.35	−6.18
Liberal	Jag Chugha	32,264	35.65	+6.18
Labor hold		Swing	−6.18	

=== Wannon ===
2013 Australian federal election: Wannon
Party	Candidate	Votes	%	±%
Liberal	Dan Tehan	47,392	53.73	+8.29
Labor	Michael Barling	26,044	29.53	−1.79
Greens	Tim Emanuelle	5,668	6.43	+0.20
Palmer United	Bradley Ferguson	3,519	3.99	+3.99
Sex Party	Chris Johnson	2,455	2.78	+2.78
Family First	Craig Haberfield	1,957	2.22	−0.10
Christians	Therese Corbett	1,167	1.32	+1.32
Total formal votes		88,202	96.01	+1.18
Informal votes		3,665	3.99	−1.18
Turnout		91,867	95.68	+0.34
Two-party-preferred result
Liberal	Dan Tehan	52,984	60.07	+4.41
Labor	Michael Barling	35,218	39.93	−4.41
Liberal hold		Swing	+4.41	

=== Wills ===
2013 Australian federal election: Wills
Party	Candidate	Votes	%	±%
Labor	Kelvin Thomson	40,931	45.14	−6.07
Liberal	Shilpa Hegde	20,710	22.84	+0.04
Greens	Tim Read	20,157	22.23	+0.12
Sex Party	Adrian Trajstman	2,363	2.61	+2.51
Palmer United	Anne Murray-Dufoulon	2,158	2.38	+2.38
Independent	Dean O'Callaghan	2,040	2.25	+2.25
Family First	Concetta Giglia	1,285	1.42	−0.15
Socialist Alliance	Margarita Windisch	1,024	1.13	+0.30
Total formal votes		90,668	94.47	+0.45
Informal votes		5,304	5.53	−0.45
Turnout		95,972	90.97	−0.16
Notional two-party-preferred count
Labor	Kelvin Thomson	64,161	70.76	−2.77
Liberal	Shilpa Hegde	26,507	29.24	+2.77
Two-candidate-preferred result
Labor	Kelvin Thomson	59,118	65.20	−7.44
Greens	Tim Read	31,550	34.80	+34.80
Labor hold		Swing	N/A	

== See also ==
- 2013 Australian federal election
- Results of the 2013 Australian federal election (House of Representatives)
- Post-election pendulum for the 2013 Australian federal election
- Members of the Australian House of Representatives, 2013–2016
