= Results of the 2010 Australian federal election in Victoria =

2010 Australian federal election (Victoria)
- 21 August 2010

All 37 Victorian seats in the Australian House of Representatives and 6 (of the 12) seats in the Australian Senate
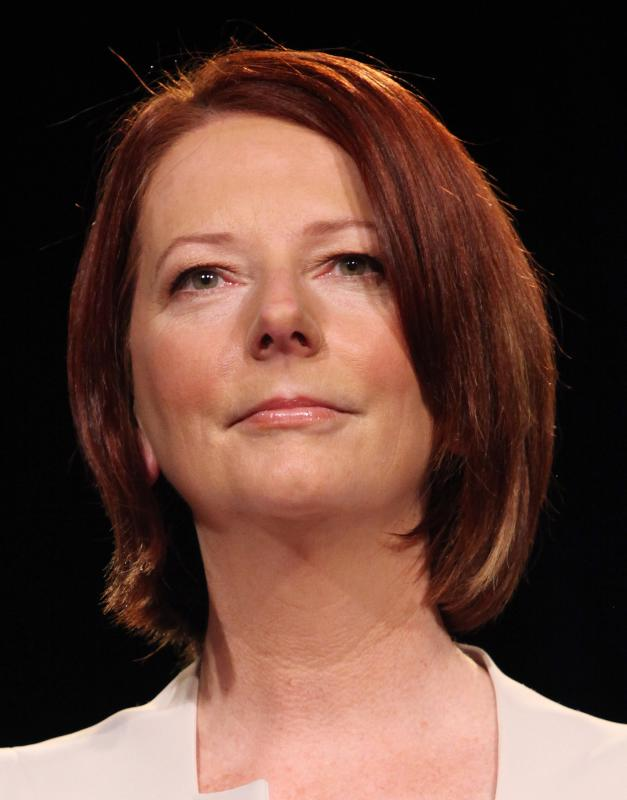

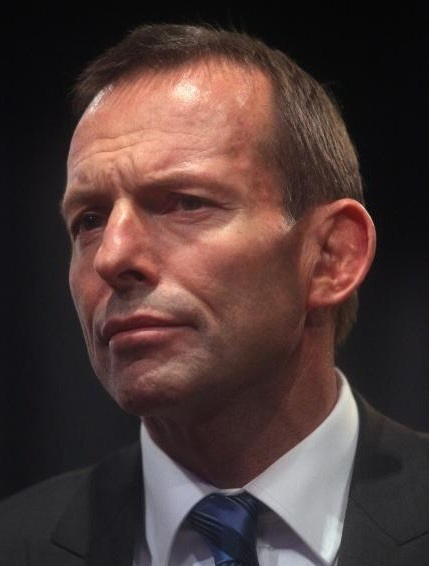

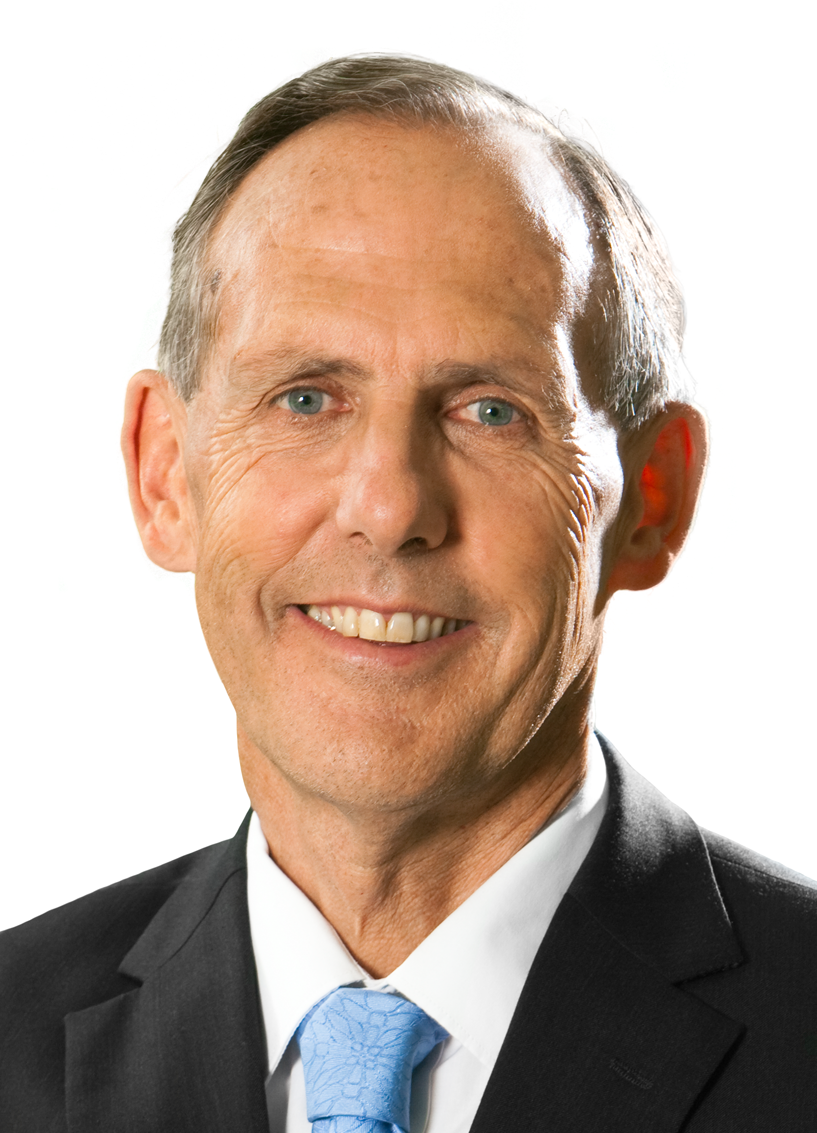
	First party	Second party	Third party
Leader	Julia Gillard	Tony Abbott	Bob Brown
Party	Labor	Liberal/National coalition	Greens
Last election	21 seats	16 seats	0 seats
Seats won	22 seats	14 seats	1 seat
Seat change	▲1	▼2	▲1
Popular vote	1,361,416	1,260,729	402,482
Percentage	42.81%	39.64%	12.66%
Swing	▼1.88%	▼1.47%	▲4.99%
TPP	55.31%	44.69%
TPP swing	▲1.04	▼1.04
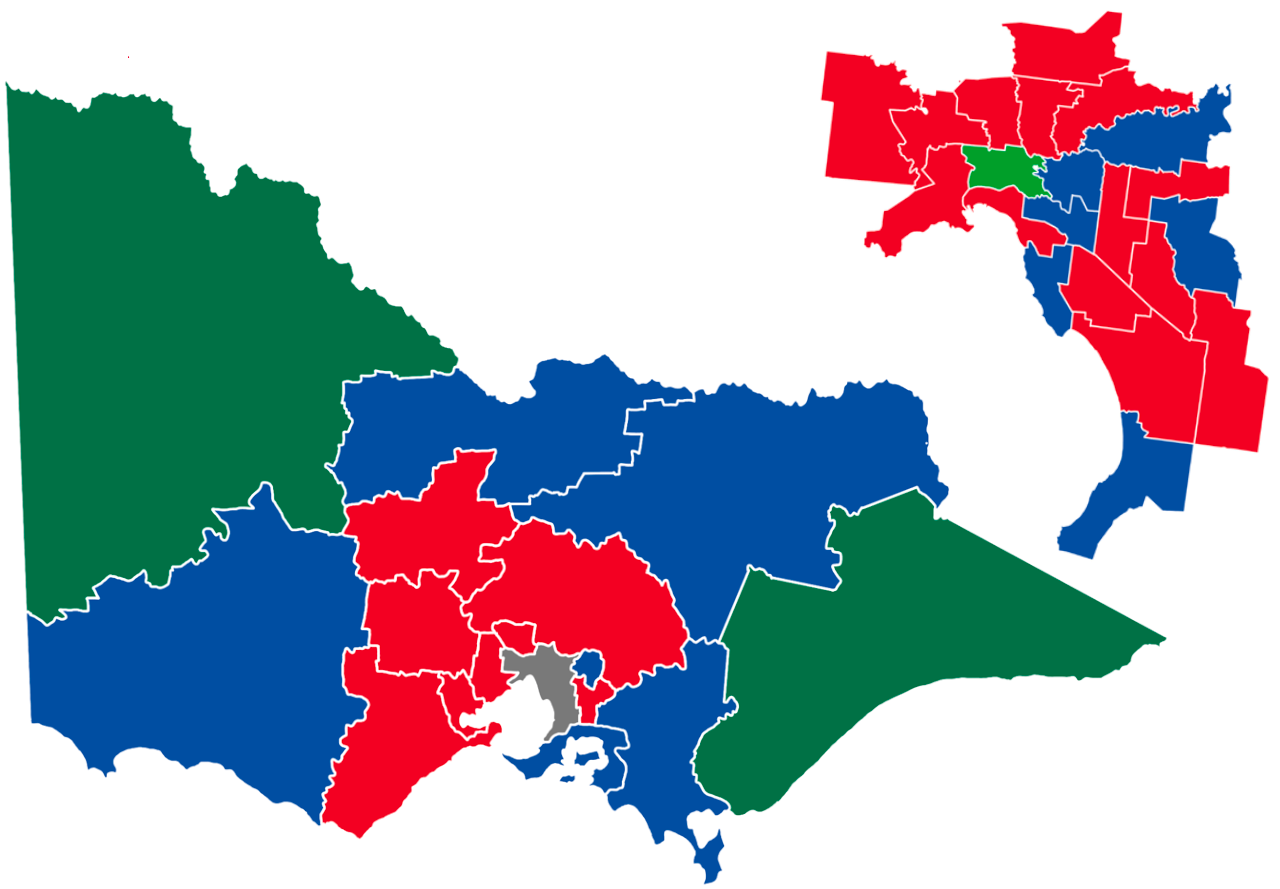
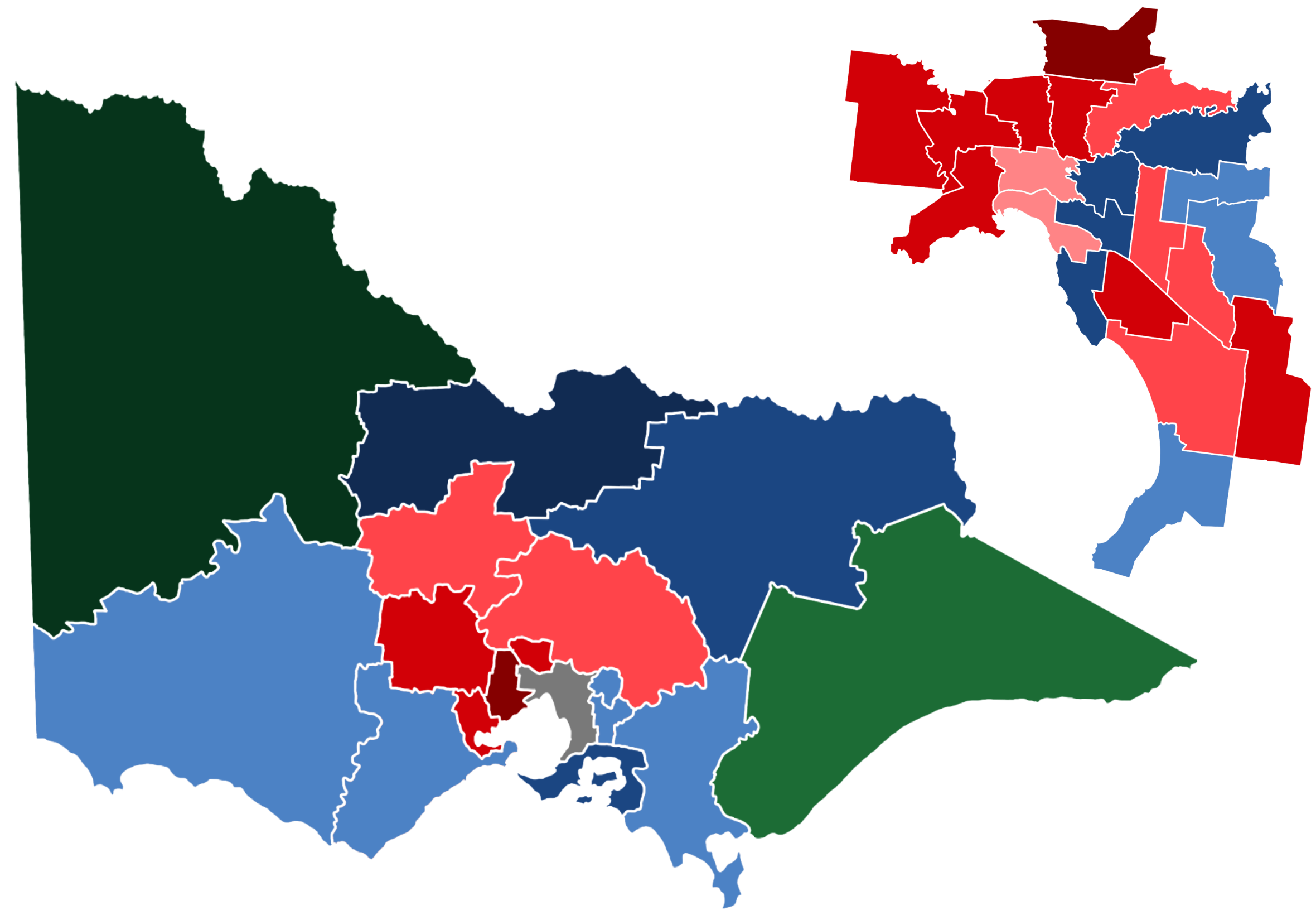
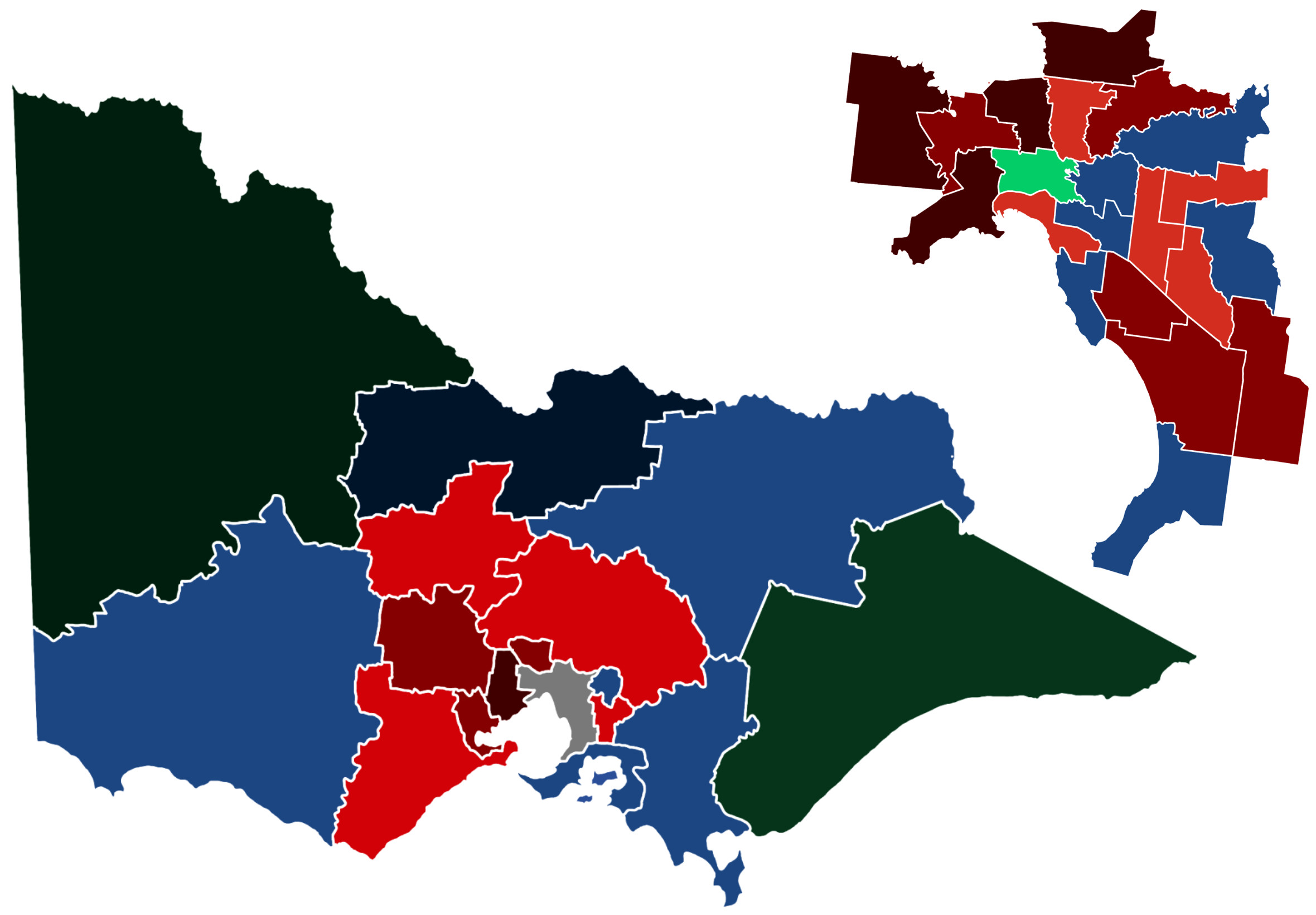

This is a list of electoral division results for the Australian 2010 federal election in the state of Victoria.

== Overall ==
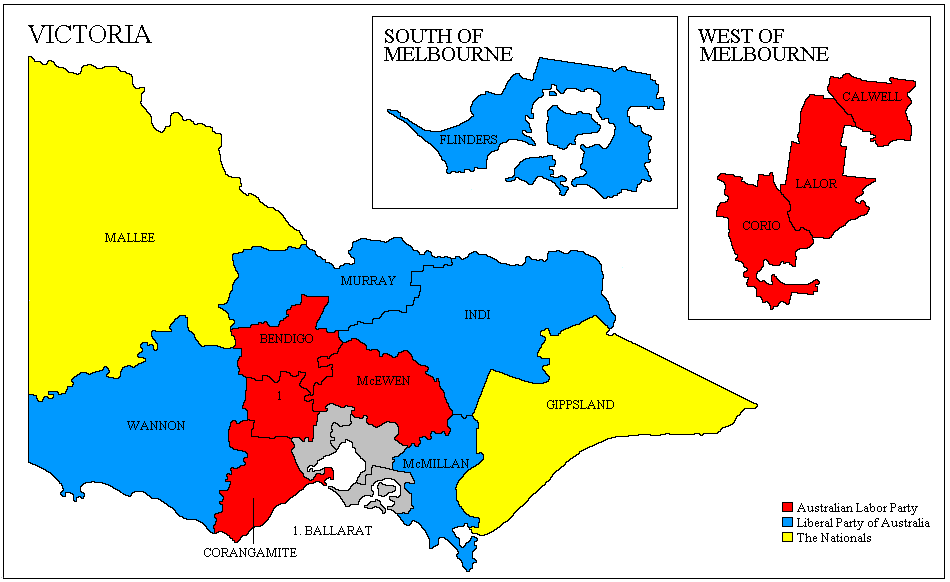
Electoral divisions: Victoria

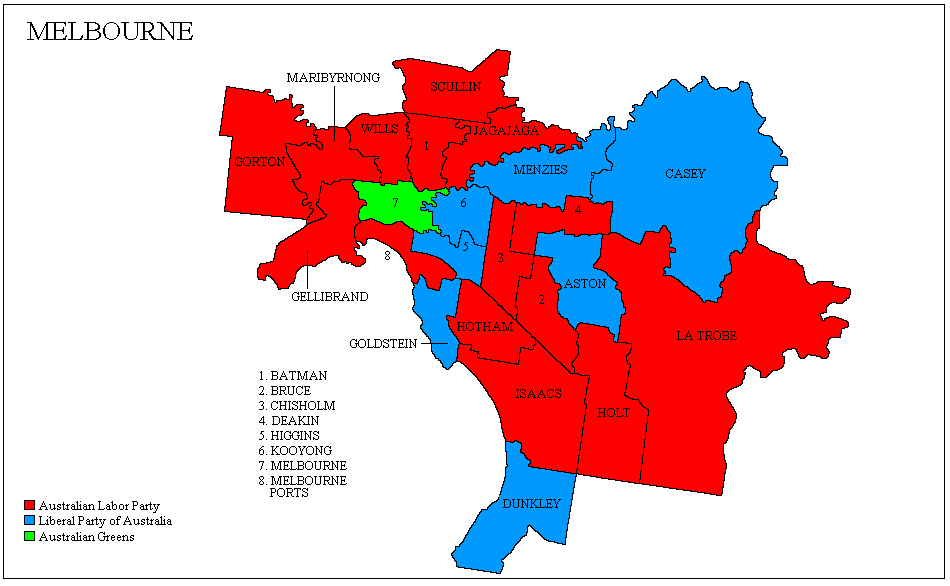
Electoral divisions: Melbourne area

Turnout 93.46% (CV) — Informal 4.50%
Party	Votes	%	Swing	Seats	Change
Australian Labor Party	1,361,416	42.81	–1.88	22	▲1
Liberal	1,159,301	36.45	–1.64	12	▼2
National	101,419	3.19	+0.17	2	Steady
Coalition	1,260,720	39.64	–1.47	14	▼2
Australian Greens	402,482	12.66	+4.49	1	▲1
Family First Party	99,747	3.14	+0.12		
Independents	26,525	0.83	−0.17		
Liberal Democratic Party	7,839	0.25	+0.15		
Australian Sex Party	6,023	0.19	+0.19		
Secular Party of Australia	5,239	0.16	+0.16		
Australian Democrats	3,947	0.12	−1.10		
Socialist Alliance	2,225	0.07	+0.00		
Socialist Equality Party	1,656	0.05	+0.03		
Citizens Electoral Council	922	0.03	−0.24		
Christian Democratic Party	632	0.02	−0.02		
Australia First Party	295	0.01	+0.01		
Others	516	0.02	+0.00		
Total	3,180,184			37	
Two-party-preferred vote
Australian Labor Party	1,758,982	55.31	+1.04	22	▲1
Liberal/National Coalition	1,421,202	44.69	–1.04	14	▼2
Invalid/blank votes	149,699	4.50	+1.25		
Registered voters/turnout	3,561,873	93.49			
Source: Commonwealth Election 2010

== Results by division ==
=== Aston ===
2010 Australian federal election: Aston
Party	Candidate	Votes	%	±%
Liberal	Alan Tudge	39,733	46.85	−3.86
Labor	Rupert Evans	32,725	38.58	−0.26
Greens	Salore Craig	8,206	9.67	+4.44
Family First	Rachel Hanna	4,153	4.90	+1.43
Total formal votes		84,817	95.65	−1.41
Informal votes		3,854	4.35	+1.41
Turnout		88,671	94.89	−1.50
Two-party-preferred result
Liberal	Alan Tudge	43,901	51.76	−3.29
Labor	Rupert Evans	40,916	48.24	+3.29
Liberal hold		Swing	−3.29	

=== Ballarat ===
2010 Australian federal election: Ballarat
Party	Candidate	Votes	%	±%
Labor	Catherine King	46,289	51.75	+1.42
Liberal	Mark Banwell	30,364	33.95	−4.09
Greens	Belinda Coates	10,140	11.34	+3.36
Family First	Jim Rainey	2,646	2.96	−0.69
Total formal votes		89,439	96.28	−1.31
Informal votes		3,456	3.72	+1.31
Turnout		92,895	94.98	−1.11
Two-party-preferred result
Labor	Catherine King	55,188	61.70	+3.55
Liberal	Mark Banwell	34,251	38.30	−3.55
Labor hold		Swing	+3.55	

=== Batman ===
2010 Australian federal election: Batman
Party	Candidate	Votes	%	±%
Labor	Martin Ferguson	40,574	52.38	−4.80
Greens	Alex Bhathal	18,189	23.48	+6.31
Liberal	George Souris	15,412	19.90	−0.74
Family First	Andrew Conlon	2,465	3.18	+0.56
Democrats	Con Sarazen	823	1.06	−0.97
Total formal votes		77,463	94.85	−1.33
Informal votes		4,202	5.15	+1.33
Turnout		81,665	91.59	−2.61
Two-party-preferred result
Labor	Martin Ferguson	58,028	74.91	−1.04
Liberal	George Souris	19,435	25.09	+1.04
Two-candidate-preferred result
Labor	Martin Ferguson	44,819	57.86	−18.09
Greens	Alex Bhathal	32,644	42.14	+42.14
Labor hold		Swing	−18.09	

=== Bendigo ===
2010 Australian federal election: Bendigo
Party	Candidate	Votes	%	±%
Labor	Steve Gibbons	43,965	47.65	+0.51
Liberal	Craig Hunter	33,067	35.84	−2.58
Greens	Kymberlie Dimozantos	11,341	12.29	+5.04
Family First	Alan Howard	3,892	4.22	+0.67
Total formal votes		92,265	96.26	−0.20
Informal votes		3,588	3.74	+0.20
Turnout		95,853	95.19	−0.84
Two-party-preferred result
Labor	Steve Gibbons	54,928	59.53	+3.40
Liberal	Craig Hunter	37,337	40.47	−3.40
Labor hold		Swing	+3.40	

=== Bruce ===
2010 Australian federal election: Bruce
Party	Candidate	Votes	%	±%
Labor	Alan Griffin	37,794	49.24	−2.61
Liberal	Mike Kabos	28,580	37.24	−0.33
Greens	Stefan Zibell	7,222	9.41	+4.32
Family First	Felicity Hemmersbach	3,151	4.11	+1.26
Total formal votes		76,747	94.79	−1.50
Informal votes		4,220	5.21	+1.50
Turnout		80,967	91.83	−2.75
Two-party-preferred result
Labor	Alan Griffin	44,603	58.12	−0.20
Liberal	Mike Kabos	32,144	41.88	+0.20
Labor hold		Swing	−0.20	

=== Calwell ===
2010 Australian federal election: Calwell
Party	Candidate	Votes	%	±%
Labor	Maria Vamvakinou	49,580	56.63	−3.59
Liberal	Wayne Tseng	22,556	25.76	−0.79
Greens	Lenka Thompson	10,386	11.86	+7.50
Family First	Jeff Truscott	3,851	4.40	+0.06
Socialist Equality	Peter Byrne	1,181	1.35	+1.03
Total formal votes		87,554	93.47	−1.68
Informal votes		6,114	6.53	+1.68
Turnout		93,668	92.45	−2.39
Two-party-preferred result
Labor	Maria Vamvakinou	61,045	69.72	+0.39
Liberal	Wayne Tseng	26,509	30.28	−0.39
Labor hold		Swing	+0.39	

=== Casey ===
2010 Australian federal election: Casey
Party	Candidate	Votes	%	±%
Liberal	Tony Smith	40,588	48.38	−1.77
Labor	Sami Hisheh	29,565	35.24	−0.61
Greens	Brendan Powell	9,661	11.52	+4.20
Family First	Daniel Harrison	4,083	4.87	+0.68
Total formal votes		83,897	95.78	−1.44
Informal votes		3,695	4.22	+1.44
Turnout		87,592	94.84	−1.38
Two-party-preferred result
Liberal	Tony Smith	45,458	54.18	−1.75
Labor	Sami Hisheh	38,439	45.82	+1.75
Liberal hold		Swing	−1.75	

=== Chisholm ===
2010 Australian federal election: Chisholm
Party	Candidate	Votes	%	±%
Labor	Anna Burke	34,492	44.53	−3.59
Liberal	John Nguyen	31,093	40.15	+0.70
Greens	Josh Fergeus	9,196	11.87	+3.40
Family First	Phil Goodman	2,107	2.72	+0.27
Secular	Nimrod Evans	562	0.73	+0.73
Total formal votes		77,450	96.41	−0.98
Informal votes		2,880	3.59	+0.98
Turnout		80,330	93.11	−2.16
Two-party-preferred result
Labor	Anna Burke	43,459	56.11	−1.27
Liberal	John Nguyen	33,991	43.89	+1.27
Labor hold		Swing	−1.27	

=== Corangamite ===
2010 Australian federal election: Corangamite
Party	Candidate	Votes	%	±%
Liberal	Sarah Henderson	42,155	44.99	+0.29
Labor	Darren Cheeseman	37,043	39.53	−2.38
Greens	Mike Lawrence	10,713	11.43	+3.46
Family First	Ann Wojczuk	1,850	1.97	−1.59
Independent	Sally-Anne Brown	1,418	1.51	+1.51
Liberal Democrats	Nathan Timmins	520	0.55	+0.36
Total formal votes		93,699	96.78	−0.69
Informal votes		3,117	3.22	+0.69
Turnout		96,816	95.32	−1.15
Two-party-preferred result
Labor	Darren Cheeseman	47,235	50.41	−0.44
Liberal	Sarah Henderson	46,464	49.59	+0.44
Labor hold		Swing	−0.44	

=== Corio ===
2010 Australian federal election: Corio
Party	Candidate	Votes	%	±%
Labor	Richard Marles	42,578	51.51	+6.02
Liberal	Don Gibson	25,729	31.13	+1.52
Greens	Gavin Brown	10,355	12.53	+6.62
Family First	Scott Amberley	3,028	3.66	−0.30
Socialist Alliance	Sue Bull	971	1.17	+0.77
Total formal votes		82,661	95.49	−0.78
Informal votes		3,905	4.51	+0.78
Turnout		86,566	94.12	−1.30
Two-party-preferred result
Labor	Richard Marles	53,083	64.22	+5.29
Liberal	Don Gibson	29,578	35.78	−5.29
Labor hold		Swing	+5.29	

=== Deakin ===
2010 Australian federal election: Deakin
Party	Candidate	Votes	%	±%
Liberal	Phil Barresi	33,553	41.94	−2.41
Labor	Mike Symon	31,941	39.93	−1.93
Greens	David Howell	10,338	12.92	+4.44
Family First	Peter Lake	2,532	3.17	+0.02
Independent	Abraham Seviloglou	836	1.05	+1.05
Liberal Democrats	Benjamin Walsh	505	0.63	−0.08
Australia First	Alex Norwick	295	0.37	+0.37
Total formal votes		80,000	96.42	−1.49
Informal votes		2,967	3.58	+1.49
Turnout		82,967	94.56	−1.33
Two-party-preferred result
Labor	Mike Symon	41,927	52.41	+1.00
Liberal	Phil Barresi	38,073	47.59	−1.00
Labor hold		Swing	+1.00	

=== Dunkley ===
2010 Australian federal election: Dunkley
Party	Candidate	Votes	%	±%
Liberal	Bruce Billson	40,602	47.32	−2.47
Labor	Helen Constas	32,889	38.33	+0.07
Greens	Simon Tiller	10,033	11.69	+3.94
Family First	Yasmin de Zilwa	2,276	2.65	+0.06
Total formal votes		85,800	96.08	−1.30
Informal votes		3,498	3.92	+1.30
Turnout		89,298	93.68	−1.55
Two-party-preferred result
Liberal	Bruce Billson	43,777	51.02	−3.02
Labor	Helen Constas	42,023	48.98	+3.02
Liberal hold		Swing	−3.02	

=== Flinders ===
2010 Australian federal election: Flinders
Party	Candidate	Votes	%	±%
Liberal	Greg Hunt	49,146	54.30	−0.17
Labor	Francis Gagliano-Ventura	28,747	31.76	−2.12
Greens	Robert Brown	10,410	11.50	+3.02
Family First	Reade Smith	2,198	2.43	+0.19
Total formal votes		90,501	95.87	−1.35
Informal votes		3,895	4.13	+1.35
Turnout		94,396	93.58	−1.85
Two-party-preferred result
Liberal	Greg Hunt	53,499	59.11	+0.86
Labor	Francis Gagliano-Ventura	37,002	40.89	−0.86
Liberal hold		Swing	+0.86	

=== Gellibrand ===
2010 Australian federal election: Gellibrand
Party	Candidate	Votes	%	±%
Labor	Nicola Roxon	48,971	58.81	−1.41
Liberal	David McConnell	19,070	22.90	+0.06
Greens	Rodney Solin	12,779	15.35	+5.97
Family First	Liz Mumby	1,440	1.73	−0.29
Socialist Alliance	Ben Courtice	528	0.63	−0.96
Socialist Equality	Tania Baptist	475	0.57	+0.57
Total formal votes		83,263	95.00	−0.78
Informal votes		4,378	5.00	+0.78
Turnout		87,641	91.66	−2.50
Two-party-preferred result
Labor	Nicola Roxon	61,531	73.90	+2.44
Liberal	David McConnell	21,732	26.10	−2.44
Labor hold		Swing	+2.44	

=== Gippsland ===
2010 Australian federal election: Gippsland
Party	Candidate	Votes	%	±%
National	Darren Chester	47,020	53.00	+4.63
Labor	Darren McCubbin	28,008	31.57	−4.98
Greens	Michael Bond	5,826	6.57	+1.03
Liberal Democrats	Ben Buckley	4,895	5.52	+5.52
Family First	Heath Jefferis	2,963	3.34	−0.97
Total formal votes		88,712	96.21	−0.81
Informal votes		3,496	3.79	+0.81
Total votes		92,208	94.53	−1.14
Two-party-preferred result
National	Darren Chester	54,513	61.45	+5.54
Labor	Darren McCubbin	34,199	38.55	−5.54
National hold		Swing	+5.54	

=== Goldstein ===
2010 Australian federal election: Goldstein
Party	Candidate	Votes	%	±%
Liberal	Andrew Robb	44,436	52.55	−0.37
Labor	Nick Eden	25,227	29.83	−3.86
Greens	Neil Pilling	13,708	16.21	+5.84
Family First	Anthony Forster	1,187	1.40	+0.26
Total formal votes		84,558	96.87	−0.71
Informal votes		2,735	3.13	+0.71
Turnout		87,293	92.92	−2.04
Two-party-preferred result
Liberal	Andrew Robb	47,747	56.47	+0.42
Labor	Nick Eden	36,811	43.53	−0.42
Liberal hold		Swing	+0.42	

=== Gorton ===
2010 Australian federal election: Gorton
Party	Candidate	Votes	%	±%
Labor	Brendan O'Connor	58,767	59.98	−1.95
Liberal	Damon Ryder	23,116	23.59	−0.73
Greens	Steve Wilson	9,949	10.15	+4.06
Family First	Sean Major	6,153	6.28	+2.33
Total formal votes		97,985	93.29	−2.27
Informal votes		7,048	6.71	+2.27
Turnout		105,033	92.41	−2.51
Two-party-preferred result
Labor	Brendan O'Connor	70,705	72.16	+0.94
Liberal	Damon Ryder	27,280	27.84	−0.94
Labor hold		Swing	+0.94	

=== Higgins ===
2010 Australian federal election: Higgins
Party	Candidate	Votes	%	±%
Liberal	Kelly O'Dwyer	42,086	51.74	−1.87
Labor	Tony Clark	22,700	27.91	−3.17
Greens	Sam Hibbins	14,559	17.90	+7.15
Independent	David Fawcett	1,225	1.51	+1.51
Family First	Ashley Truter	777	0.96	+0.19
Total formal votes		81,347	97.20	−0.23
Informal votes		2,343	2.80	+0.23
Turnout		83,690	92.58	−1.19
Two-party-preferred result
Liberal	Kelly O'Dwyer	46,167	56.75	−0.29
Labor	Tony Clark	35,180	43.25	+0.29
Liberal hold		Swing	−0.29	

=== Holt ===
2010 Australian federal election: Holt
Party	Candidate	Votes	%	±%
Labor	Anthony Byrne	51,998	54.42	−1.23
Liberal	Ricardo Balancy	29,254	30.62	−3.60
Greens	Frank di Mascolo	8,745	9.15	+5.03
Family First	Ian George	4,772	4.99	+0.60
Secular	Mark Hitchins	776	0.81	+0.81
Total formal votes		95,545	94.31	−2.13
Informal votes		5,764	5.69	+2.13
Turnout		101,309	93.04	−2.39
Two-party-preferred result
Labor	Anthony Byrne	60,412	63.23	+1.60
Liberal	Ricardo Balancy	35,133	36.77	−1.60
Labor hold		Swing	+1.60	

=== Hotham ===
2010 Australian federal election: Hotham
Party	Candidate	Votes	%	±%
Labor	Simon Crean	42,920	54.08	−1.07
Liberal	Fazal Cader	26,110	32.90	−0.85
Greens	Geoff Payne	8,086	10.19	+3.34
Family First	Gary Ong	1,688	2.13	+0.09
Secular	Trent Reardon	556	0.70	+0.70
Total formal votes		79,360	95.56	−1.14
Informal votes		3,684	4.44	+1.14
Turnout		83,044	92.70	−2.09
Two-party-preferred result
Labor	Simon Crean	50,394	63.50	+0.50
Liberal	Fazal Cader	28,966	36.50	−0.50
Labor hold		Swing	+0.50	

=== Indi ===
2010 Australian federal election: Indi
Party	Candidate	Votes	%	±%
Liberal	Sophie Mirabella	44,555	52.62	−1.76
Labor	Zuvele Leschen	23,034	27.20	−4.92
Greens	Jenny O'Connor	8,000	9.45	+1.87
Independent	Alan Lappin	4,945	5.84	+5.84
Family First	Robert Cavedon	3,190	3.77	−0.05
Democrats	Mark Carey	947	1.12	−0.57
Total formal votes		84,671	96.09	−1.23
Informal votes		3,449	3.91	+1.23
Turnout		88,120	94.80	−1.00
Two-party-preferred result
Liberal	Sophie Mirabella	50,755	59.94	+0.75
Labor	Zuvele Leschen	33,916	40.06	−0.75
Liberal hold		Swing	+0.75	

=== Isaacs ===
2010 Australian federal election: Isaacs
Party	Candidate	Votes	%	±%
Labor	Mark Dreyfus	45,131	49.42	+0.67
Liberal	Dale McClelland	31,472	34.47	−4.00
Greens	Chris Carman	9,980	10.93	+4.69
Family First	Heather Wheatley	3,377	3.70	+1.15
Independent	Gordon Ford	1,355	1.48	+0.22
Total formal votes		91,315	95.29	−1.40
Informal votes		4,516	4.71	+1.40
Turnout		95,831	93.23	−1.95
Two-party-preferred result
Labor	Mark Dreyfus	55,721	61.02	+3.33
Liberal	Dale McClelland	35,594	38.98	−3.33
Labor hold		Swing	+3.33	

=== Jagajaga ===
2010 Australian federal election: Jagajaga
Party	Candidate	Votes	%	±%
Labor	Jenny Macklin	40,682	47.34	−0.82
Liberal	Joh Bauch	29,745	34.61	−2.94
Greens	Chris Kearney	12,847	14.95	+4.70
Family First	Joe Sgarlata	2,109	2.45	+0.09
Secular	Peter Harris	560	0.65	+0.65
Total formal votes		85,943	96.03	−1.52
Informal votes		3,556	3.97	+1.52
Turnout		89,499	94.01	−1.71
Two-party-preferred result
Labor	Jenny Macklin	52,868	61.52	+2.54
Liberal	Joh Bauch	33,075	38.48	−2.54
Labor hold		Swing	+2.54	

=== Kooyong ===
2010 Australian federal election: Kooyong
Party	Candidate	Votes	%	±%
Liberal	Josh Frydenberg	42,728	52.56	−2.58
Labor	Steve Hurd	22,268	27.39	−2.64
Greens	Des Benson	15,019	18.48	+6.66
Family First	John Laidler	1,272	1.56	+0.02
Total formal votes		81,287	97.22	−0.68
Informal votes		2,326	2.78	+0.68
Turnout		83,613	93.26	−1.54
Two-party-preferred result
Liberal	Josh Frydenberg	46,779	57.55	−1.98
Labor	Steve Hurd	34,508	42.45	+1.98
Liberal hold		Swing	−1.98	

=== Lalor ===
2010 Australian federal election: Lalor
Party	Candidate	Votes	%	±%
Labor	Julia Gillard	66,298	64.25	+4.36
Liberal	Sheridan Ingram	23,791	23.06	−6.71
Greens	Peter Taylor	7,045	6.83	+2.81
Family First	Lori McLean	2,880	2.79	−1.61
Secular	Paul Sheehan	881	0.85	+0.85
Independent	Joanne Clarke	708	0.69	+0.69
Independent	Brian Shaw	659	0.64	+0.64
Revolutionary Socialist	Van Rudd	516	0.50	+0.50
Independent	Marc Aussie-Stone	410	0.40	+0.40
Total formal votes		103,188	93.76	−2.75
Informal votes		6,864	6.24	+2.75
Turnout		110,052	94.04	−1.38
Two-party-preferred result
Labor	Julia Gillard	74,452	72.15	+6.62
Liberal	Sheridan Ingram	28,736	27.85	−6.62
Labor hold		Swing	+6.62	

=== La Trobe ===
2010 Australian federal election: La Trobe
Party	Candidate	Votes	%	±%
Liberal	Jason Wood	39,053	43.88	−2.60
Labor	Laura Smyth	33,970	38.17	−2.22
Greens	Jim Reiher	10,931	12.28	+3.44
Sex Party	Martin Leahy	2,539	2.85	+2.85
Family First	David Barrow	1,917	2.15	−0.69
Liberal Democrats	Shem Bennett	587	0.66	+0.56
Total formal votes		88,997	95.93	−0.79
Informal votes		3,773	4.07	+0.79
Turnout		92,770	94.70	−1.14
Two-party-preferred result
Labor	Laura Smyth	45,308	50.91	+1.42
Liberal	Jason Wood	43,689	49.09	−1.42
Labor gain from Liberal		Swing	+1.42	

=== Mallee ===
2010 Australian federal election: Mallee
Party	Candidate	Votes	%	±%
National	John Forrest	54,399	66.79	+2.85
Labor	Bob Scates	16,198	19.89	−1.96
Greens	Helen Healy	6,400	7.86	+3.69
Family First	Carl Carter	4,456	5.47	−1.06
Total formal votes		81,453	95.77	−0.64
Informal votes		3,594	4.23	+0.64
Turnout		85,047	94.66	−1.23
Two-party-preferred result
National	John Forrest	60,611	74.41	+3.14
Labor	Bob Scates	20,842	25.59	−3.14
National hold		Swing	+3.14	

=== Maribyrnong ===
2010 Australian federal election: Maribyrnong
Party	Candidate	Votes	%	±%
Labor	Bill Shorten	42,404	55.38	−2.19
Liberal	Conrad D'Souza	22,262	29.07	−0.95
Greens	Tim Long	9,077	11.85	+5.03
Family First	Colin Moyle	1,988	2.60	+0.02
Democrats	Robert Livesay	841	1.10	−0.47
Total formal votes		76,572	94.32	−1.70
Informal votes		4,607	5.68	+1.70
Turnout		81,179	91.82	−2.33
Two-party-preferred result
Labor	Bill Shorten	51,193	66.86	+1.54
Liberal	Conrad D'Souza	25,379	33.14	−1.54
Labor hold		Swing	+1.54	

=== McEwen ===
2010 Australian federal election: McEwen
Party	Candidate	Votes	%	±%
Labor	Rob Mitchell	45,374	43.17	+2.97
Liberal	Cameron Caine	42,054	40.01	−5.76
Greens	Steve Meacher	12,440	11.84	+3.16
Family First	Belinda Clarkson	3,358	3.19	+0.70
Liberal Democrats	Mark Bini	1,332	1.27	+0.44
Secular	Robert Gordon	549	0.52	+0.52
Total formal votes		105,107	95.60	−0.44
Informal votes		4,843	4.40	+0.44
Turnout		109,950	94.96	−1.28
Two-party-preferred result
Labor	Rob Mitchell	58,144	55.32	+5.34
Liberal	Cameron Caine	46,963	44.68	−5.34
Labor gain from Liberal		Swing	+5.34	

=== McMillan ===
2010 Australian federal election: McMillan
Party	Candidate	Votes	%	±%
Liberal	Russell Broadbent	41,870	49.28	−0.65
Labor	Christine Maxfield	30,212	35.56	−2.58
Greens	Malcolm McKelvie	8,258	9.72	+3.72
Family First	Linden Stokes	2,776	3.27	+0.33
Independent	Leigh Gatt	1,844	2.17	+2.17
Total formal votes		84,960	96.03	−0.54
Informal votes		3,511	3.97	+0.54
Turnout		88,471	94.80	−1.08
Two-party-preferred result
Liberal	Russell Broadbent	46,229	54.41	−0.38
Labor	Christine Maxfield	38,731	45.59	+0.38
Liberal hold		Swing	−0.38	

=== Melbourne ===
2010 Australian federal election: Melbourne
Party	Candidate	Votes	%	±%
Labor	Cath Bowtell	34,022	38.09	−11.42
Greens	Adam Bandt	32,308	36.17	+13.37
Liberal	Simon Olsen	18,760	21.00	−2.49
Sex Party	Joel Murray	1,633	1.83	+1.83
Family First	Georgia Pearson	1,389	1.55	+0.55
Secular	Penelope Green	613	0.69	+0.69
Democrats	David Collyer	602	0.67	−0.76
Total formal votes		89,327	96.38	−0.82
Informal votes		3,356	3.62	+0.82
Turnout		92,683	90.09	−1.41
Notional two-party-preferred count
Labor	Cath Bowtell	65,473	73.30	+1.03
Liberal	Simon Olsen	23,854	26.70	−1.03
Two-candidate-preferred result
Greens	Adam Bandt	50,059	56.04	+10.75
Labor	Cath Bowtell	39,268	43.96	−10.75
Greens gain from Labor		Swing	+10.75	

=== Melbourne Ports ===
2010 Australian federal election: Melbourne Ports
Party	Candidate	Votes	%	±%
Labor	Michael Danby	32,391	38.19	−4.28
Liberal	Kevin Ekendahl	32,057	37.79	−1.89
Greens	Sue Plowright	17,528	20.66	+5.63
Sex Party	Christian Vega	1,851	2.18	+2.18
Family First	Daniel Emmerson	632	0.75	−0.10
Secular	Gregory Storer	362	0.43	+0.43
Total formal votes		84,821	96.75	−1.09
Informal votes		2,848	3.25	+1.09
Turnout		87,669	89.67	−2.05
Two-party-preferred result
Labor	Michael Danby	48,819	57.56	+0.41
Liberal	Kevin Ekendahl	36,002	42.44	−0.41
Labor hold		Swing	+0.41	

=== Menzies ===
2010 Australian federal election: Menzies
Party	Candidate	Votes	%	±%
Liberal	Kevin Andrews	43,932	53.63	+2.03
Labor	Joy Banerji	26,287	32.09	−2.69
Greens	Chris Padgham	8,802	10.75	+4.46
Family First	Ken Smithies	2,892	3.53	+1.11
Total formal votes		81,913	95.91	−1.33
Informal votes		3,497	4.09	+1.33
Turnout		85,410	93.89	−2.26
Two-party-preferred result
Liberal	Kevin Andrews	48,102	58.72	+2.70
Labor	Joy Banerji	33,811	41.28	−2.70
Liberal hold		Swing	+2.70	

=== Murray ===
2010 Australian federal election: Murray
Party	Candidate	Votes	%	±%
Liberal	Sharman Stone	52,337	64.98	+2.91
Labor	Hugh Mortensen	18,842	23.39	−0.72
Greens	Ian Christoe	4,906	6.09	+3.14
Family First	Serena Moore	2,958	3.67	+0.35
Christian Democrats	Ewan McDonald	632	0.78	+0.78
Citizens Electoral Council	Jeff Davy	493	0.61	+0.36
Secular	William Clarke-Hannaford	380	0.47	+0.47
Total formal votes		80,548	94.17	−0.59
Informal votes		4,986	5.83	+0.59
Turnout		85,534	94.81	−0.91
Two-party-preferred result
Liberal	Sharman Stone	56,666	70.35	+2.09
Labor	Hugh Mortensen	23,882	29.65	−2.09
Liberal hold		Swing	+2.09	

=== Scullin ===
2010 Australian federal election: Scullin
Party	Candidate	Votes	%	±%
Labor	Harry Jenkins	49,310	62.12	−1.20
Liberal	Max Williams	19,142	24.11	−0.28
Greens	Gurm Sekhon	6,702	8.44	+2.41
Family First	Ian Stratov	4,226	5.32	+0.59
Total formal votes		79,380	94.01	−1.93
Informal votes		5,055	5.99	+1.93
Turnout		84,435	92.97	−2.73
Two-party-preferred result
Labor	Harry Jenkins	57,355	72.25	+1.40
Liberal	Max Williams	22,025	27.75	−1.40
Labor hold		Swing	+1.40	

=== Wannon ===
2010 Australian federal election: Wannon
Party	Candidate	Votes	%	±%
Liberal	Dan Tehan	38,813	46.62	−5.94
Labor	Judith McNamara	24,502	29.43	−6.74
Greens	Lisa Owen	5,016	6.03	−0.95
Independent	James Purcell	4,652	5.59	+5.59
Independent	Katrina Rainsford	4,066	4.88	+4.88
Independent	Ralph Leutton	2,582	3.10	+3.10
Family First	Jahzeel Concepcion	1,795	2.16	−2.13
Independent	Allan Marsh	1,080	1.30	+1.30
Independent	Robert O'Brien	745	0.89	+0.89
Total formal votes		83,251	94.68	−2.73
Informal votes		4,676	5.32	+2.73
Turnout		87,927	95.30	−1.10
Two-party-preferred result
Liberal	Dan Tehan	47,697	57.29	−0.18
Labor	Judith McNamara	35,554	42.71	+0.18
Liberal hold		Swing	−0.18	

=== Wills ===
2010 Australian federal election: Wills
Party	Candidate	Votes	%	±%
Labor	Kelvin Thomson	43,718	51.81	−5.08
Liberal	Claude Tomisich	20,080	23.79	−0.76
Greens	Mark Riley	17,381	20.60	+6.78
Family First	Daniel Mumby	1,320	1.56	+0.13
Democrats	Paul Roberton	734	0.87	−1.46
Socialist Alliance	Trent Hawkins	726	0.86	+0.14
Citizens Electoral Council	Craig Isherwood	429	0.51	+0.25
Total formal votes		84,388	93.98	−1.69
Informal votes		5,403	6.02	+1.69
Turnout		89,791	91.07	−2.60
Two-party-preferred result
Labor	Kelvin Thomson	61,297	72.64	+0.24
Liberal	Claude Tomisich	23,091	27.36	−0.24
Labor hold		Swing	+0.24	

== See also ==
- 2010 Australian federal election
- Results of the 2010 Australian federal election (House of Representatives)
- Post-election pendulum for the 2010 Australian federal election
- Members of the Australian House of Representatives, 2010–2013
