= Phil Barresi =

Australian politician (born 1955)

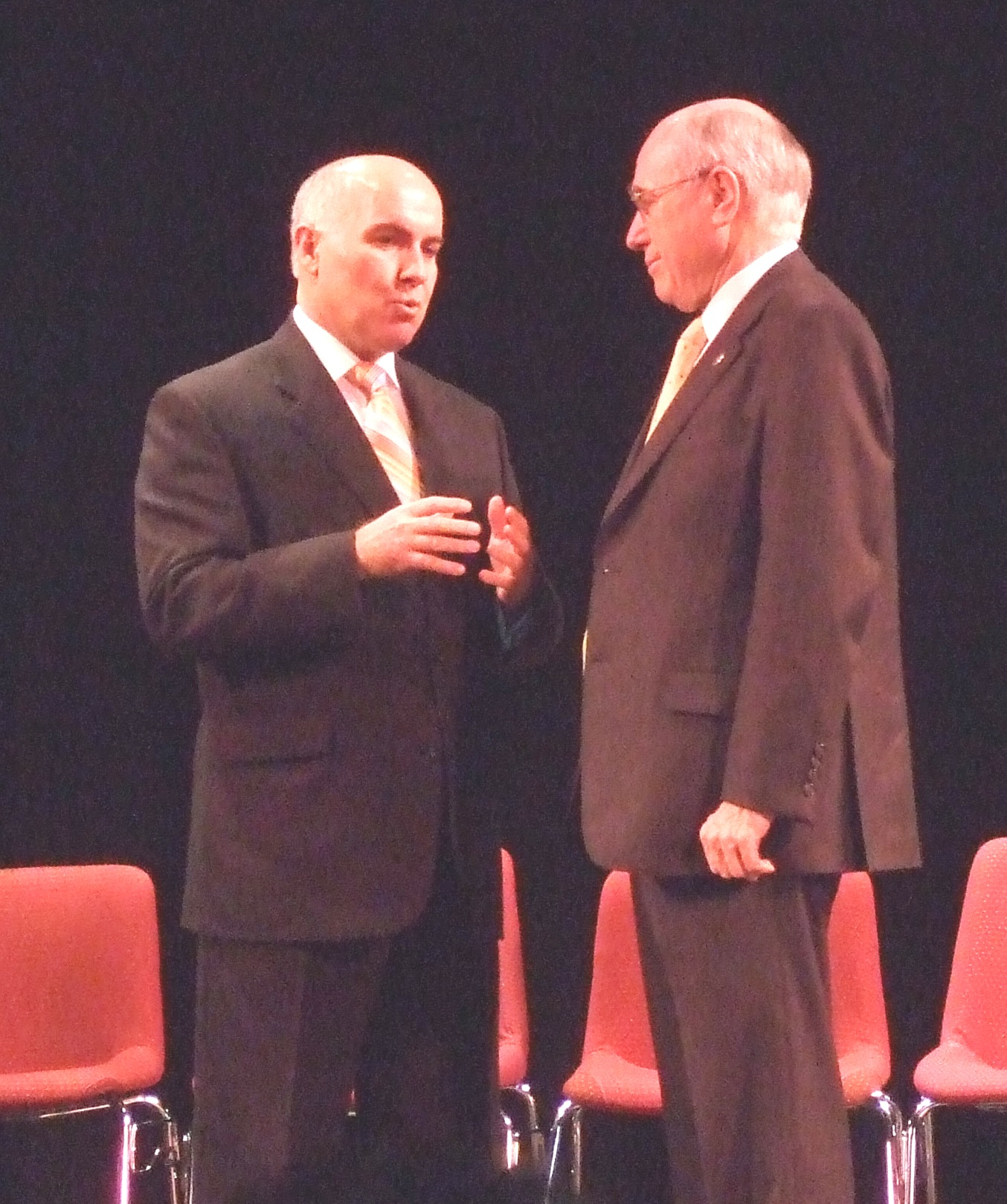
- Phil Barresi with John Howard

Member of the Australian Parliament for Deakin
- In office 2 March 1996 – 24 November 2007
- Preceded by: Ken Aldred
- Succeeded by: Mike Symon

Personal details
- Born: 8 August 1955 (age 71) Patti, Sicily
- Party: Liberal Party of Australia
- Education: Australian National University; Swinburne University
- Occupation: Psychologist

Phillip Anthony Barresi (Italian: [barˈreːzi]; born 8 August 1955) is a former Australian politician. He was a member of the House of Representatives from 1996 to 2007, representing the Victorian seat of Deakin for the Liberal Party. Prior to entering politics he was a registered psychologist and worked in human resources and industrial relations.

== Early life ==
Barresi was born on 8 August 1955 in Patti, Sicily, Italy. He spent his earliest years in the town of Falcone, arriving in Australia in 1960. He holds the degree of Bachelor of Arts from the Australian National University and a graduate diploma in applied social psychology from Swinburne Institute of Technology.

Barresi became a registered psychologist. Before entering politics he worked as a training officer with Victorian Railways, as a human resources and industrial relations manager, and as a consultant.

== Politics ==
Barresi served as president of the Liberal Party's Boroondara branch from 1992 to 1995. He was elected to the House of Representatives at the 1996 federal election, retaining the Division of Deakin for the Liberals. In his maiden speech he acknowledged that he was the first Italian-born Coalition MP.

Barresi was a member of the speaker's panel in 2004 and again from 2006 to 2007. He was also chair of the Standing Committee on Employment, Workplace Relations and Workforce Participation from 2004 to 2007. He was a prominent supporter of the Howard government's WorkChoices legislation.

At the 2007 election, Barresi was defeated by Australian Labor Party (ALP) candidate Mike Symon. He reprised his candidacy against Symon at the 2010 election but was again defeated.

== Later life ==
In 2008 he was appointed national employment relations director for the Australian Retailers Association.

In 2019, the Morrison government appointed Barresi to a five-year term on the board of the National Housing Finance and Investment Corporation.

Parliament of Australia
Preceded by Ken Aldred	Member for Deakin; 1996–2007	Succeeded by Mike Symon
