= Mike Symon =

Australian politician (born 1965)

Councillor of the City of Maroondah for Jubilee Ward
- Incumbent
- Assumed office 24 October 2020
- Preceded by: Ward created

Councillor of the City of Maroondah for Mullum Ward
- In office 22 October 2016 – 24 October 2020
- Succeeded by: Ward abolished

Member of the Australian Parliament for Deakin
- In office 24 November 2007 – 7 September 2013
- Preceded by: Phil Barresi
- Succeeded by: Michael Sukkar

Personal details
- Born: 21 February 1965 (age 61) Box Hill, Victoria, Australia
- Party: Australian Labor Party
- Occupation: Electrician

Michael Stuart Symon (born 21 February 1965) is an Australian politician who was elected to the Australian House of Representatives at the 2007 federal election as the Australian Labor Party member for the federal seat of Deakin. He had previously been an electrician and was Occupational Health and Safety Officer of the Electrical Trades Union.

He defeated the sitting Liberal member, Phil Barresi, who had held the seat since 1996. The seat had been one of the most marginal Liberal seats in the country for almost three decades. Barresi led for most of the night, but on the fifth count a large flow of Green preferences allowed Symon to become only the second Labor MP in the seat's 70-year history. At the 2010 election, Symon faced Barresi again, and was reelected with a slight swing in his favour—again due to Green preferences.

At the 2013 federal election, Symon suffered a swing of 3.8% against him and was defeated by Liberal candidate Michael Sukkar.

In 2016, Symon was elected as a councillor for the City of Maroondah's Mullum Ward. After the ward was abolished, he successfully contested the new Jubilee Ward at the 2020 local elections. Symon served Deputy Mayor from 2017 to 2018 and Mayor in 2019 until 2020.

Parliament of Australia
Preceded by Phil Barresi	Member for Deakin; 2007–2013	Succeeded by Michael Sukkar
