= Northcote Cable Tramways site =

Tram depot in Melbourne, Australia

Northcote Cable Tramways site (former)
- Location of the former site in Greater Metropolitan Melbourne

General information
- Status: Completed
- Type: Former tram engine house and depot
- Architectural style: Victorian
- Location: 626–628 High Street, Thornbury, City of Darebin, Melbourne, Victoria, Australia
- Coordinates: 37°45′38″S 145°00′02″E
- Completed: 1890; 136 years ago
- Opened: 18 February 1890
- Closed: 26 October 1940
- Client: Clifton Hill to Northcote and Preston Tramway Company
- Owner: City of Northcote (1900–1920); MTTB (1920–1940)

Technical details
- Material: Bricks; timber; wrought iron; galvanised iron

Design and construction
- Architect: Alexander Davidson (attrib.)
- Engineer: George Smith Duncan

Victorian Heritage Register
- Official name: Northcote Cable Tramways site
- Type: Registered place; Registered archaeological place
- Designated: 12 November 2009
- Reference no.: H2129
- Heritage overlay no.: HO45
- Category: Transport - Tramways

The Northcote Cable Tramways site is a former tram engine house and depot for the Melbourne cable tramway system, located at 626–628 High Street in Thornbury, in the City of Darebin, in the northern suburbs of Melbourne, Victoria, Australia.

The site includes the former Northcote cable tram building which was built by the Clifton Hill to Northcote and Preston Tramway Company in 1890 to service the Clifton Hill to Northcote Line which ran along High Street, Northcote from Dundas Street at the northern extent of the Northcote Municipality to Merri Creek at the southern extent and operated until 1940.

Built on the traditional lands of the Wurundjeri Woi-wurrung people, the site was added to the Victorian Heritage Register on 12 November 2009 in recognition of its historical, architectural, and archaeological significance; and was also added to a non-statutory list by the Victorian branch of the National Trust on 18 August 1993.

== History ==
=== Cable trams ===
The Melbourne Tramways Trust (MTT) was established in 1883 and comprised representatives of various local government municipalities in inner-city Melbourne. The MTT built cable lines and engine houses between 1884 and 1891 and remained owner of the lines and installations until dissolution of the MTT in June 1916. Melbourne Tramway & Omnibus Co. Ltd., a separate company, leased and operated the tram system. Their successors were the Melbourne Tramway Board (c.1916-1918) and then the Melbourne and Metropolitan Tramways Board (MMTB) from 1918.

When complete, there were seventeen routes on the cable tram network. The engine houses were located near the midpoint of a route and the depots at the terminus. Most of the inner cable tramway system was developed as a planned public transport system and was constructed as a single major infrastructure project from 1883 to 1891 under the control the Melbourne Tramways Trust. The Northcote line was one of a few privately-operated tramways constructed beyond the central Melbourne tram system.

=== Thornbury site ===
==== Historical use ====
The tramway system and the site at Thornbury were engineered by George Smith Duncan, who designed and supervised construction of the main Melbourne cable tramway system. The architect of the building is attributed to Alexander Davidson. The Northcote line was opened on 18 February 1890. However, due to financial difficulties associated with the 1890s depression, the line was soon in financial difficulties and closed in July 1893.

The tramway was to open and close a number of times over the next six years until July 1900 when the Northcote Council agreed to purchase the tramway. The operation was leased to private investors who re-opened the line in March 1901. From June 1916 the Northcote Council ran the tramway itself. In doing so, the Council became the first and only municipality in the state to run a tramway. The Council continued to run the line until February 1920 when the MMTB took over the operation of the line.

Under the MMTB's management the line was connected to the central cable tram network, enabling Northcote trams to operate through to the city. In time, the Northcote route, ran to Spencer Street via Queens Parade, Smith Street and Bourke Street, became the last line of Melbourne's extensive cable tram system to be converted to either electric traction or bus operation. The Northcote line closed on 26 October 1940, the last cable tram line to operate in Melbourne.

==== Contemporary use ====
Since 1962, the site has been occupied by a local motor vehicle dealer. Set on 2,409 square metres (25,930 sq ft), the former tramways site was sold in 2018 to a Hong Kong-based investor for A$$9 million.

== Description ==
The cable tram building was the only one in Melbourne where the engine house and the car shed were contained within the one structure. It was divided longitudinally into two main bays. The north bay contained the engine room, cable tension pit, boiler room and cable reel shed, while the south bay comprised the car shed. The building is constructed of brick on a bluestone base. The principal facade, fronting High Street, covers both bays and extends south to include an office on the corner of Martin Street. Both the engine room and the car shed are roofed by large timber trusses and the car shed roof includes a simple centrally located ridge ventilator. The double doorways to the car shed and engine house are expressed with projecting openings, each under a pediment highlighted by a blind circular recess in the tympanum and surmounted by a squat finial. The facade of the building is expressed through a double mid height stringcourse and a simple cornice and frieze under a parapet. The exterior of the building was painted during the twentieth century.

== See also ==
- Architecture of Melbourne
- Brunswick tram engine house and substation
- Fitzroy, Northcote & Preston Tramways Trust
- List of places on the Victorian Heritage Register in the City of Darebin
- Timeline of trams in Melbourne
