= List of places on the Victorian Heritage Register in the City of Darebin =

This is a list of places on the Victorian Heritage Register in the City of Darebin in Victoria, Australia. The Victorian Heritage Register is maintained by the Heritage Council of Victoria.

As of April 2020, the Victorian Heritage Register listed the following nine state-registered places within the City of Darebin:

Place name	Place #	Location	Suburb or Town	Co-ordinates	Built	State registered	Photo
Bundoora Park Homestead (former)	H1091	7–27 Snake Gully Dve	Bundoora	37°42′18″S 145°03′02″E	1899-1900	10 August 1995	
Little Sisters of the Poor Home for the Aged (former)	H1950	104–112 St Georges Rd	Northcote	37°46′18″S 144°59′33″E	1890	1 November 2001	
Maroondah Water Supply System (Note: Also listed on the VHR in the local government areas of Nillumbik, Whittlesea, and the Yarra Ranges Shire.) (upper and central sections)	H2381	various	Bundoora; Reservoir; Preston	37°38′31″S 145°33′05″E	1891	24 May 2018	
Mont Park Asylum (former)	H1872	Ernest Jones Dve; Springthorpe Blvd; Cherry St	Macleod	37°43′16″S 145°03′33″E	1910	10 August 2000	
Northcote Cable Tramways site (former)	H2129	626–628 High St	Thornbury	37°45′38″S 145°00′02″E	1890	12 November 2009	
Northcote Theatre	H2287	212–220 High St	Northcote	37°46′26″S 144°59′55″E	1911–12	9 June 2011	
Preston Tramway Workshops	H2031	16–18 Miller St	Preston	37°45′06″S 144°59′51″E	1924–28	9 October 2003	
Terrace Houses	H1774	186–192 Clarke St	Northcote	37°46′37″S 144°59′55″E	1888	18 February 1999	
Yan Yean Water Supply System (Note: Also listed on the VHR in the local government areas of Mitchell, Whittlesea, and the City of Yarra.)	H2333	various	Bundoora; Reservoir; Preston; Thornbury; Northcote	37°19′50″S 145°05′22″E	1853–57	12 December 2013	
