= Golden Head statues =

Australian guerilla artwork

From 25 January 2020, a set of concrete, gold-painted guerrilla artwork statues of heads were placed at the summit of All Nations Park in Northcote, Victoria in Melbourne, Australia. Their artists are unknown, though a post-hoc, anonymous and confidential artist's statement was given to Darebin Council to justify their inclusion in the park.

Golden Head was the first of these statues, placed on the eve of Australia Day 2020. A local Facebook group about the nearby shopping mall, the Northcote Plaza Appreciation Society, adopted the statue as a central figure and coined its name. The statue fell over on 6 February and was removed by Darebin Council. This was followed by the placement of the more sturdy Golden Head II on 14 March, which was itself removed by the council the next day due to its unauthorised status. The original statue was reinstalled on 26 June after the anonymous artists engaged in an email dialogue with the council, with a local resident acting as an intermediary.

== Background ==
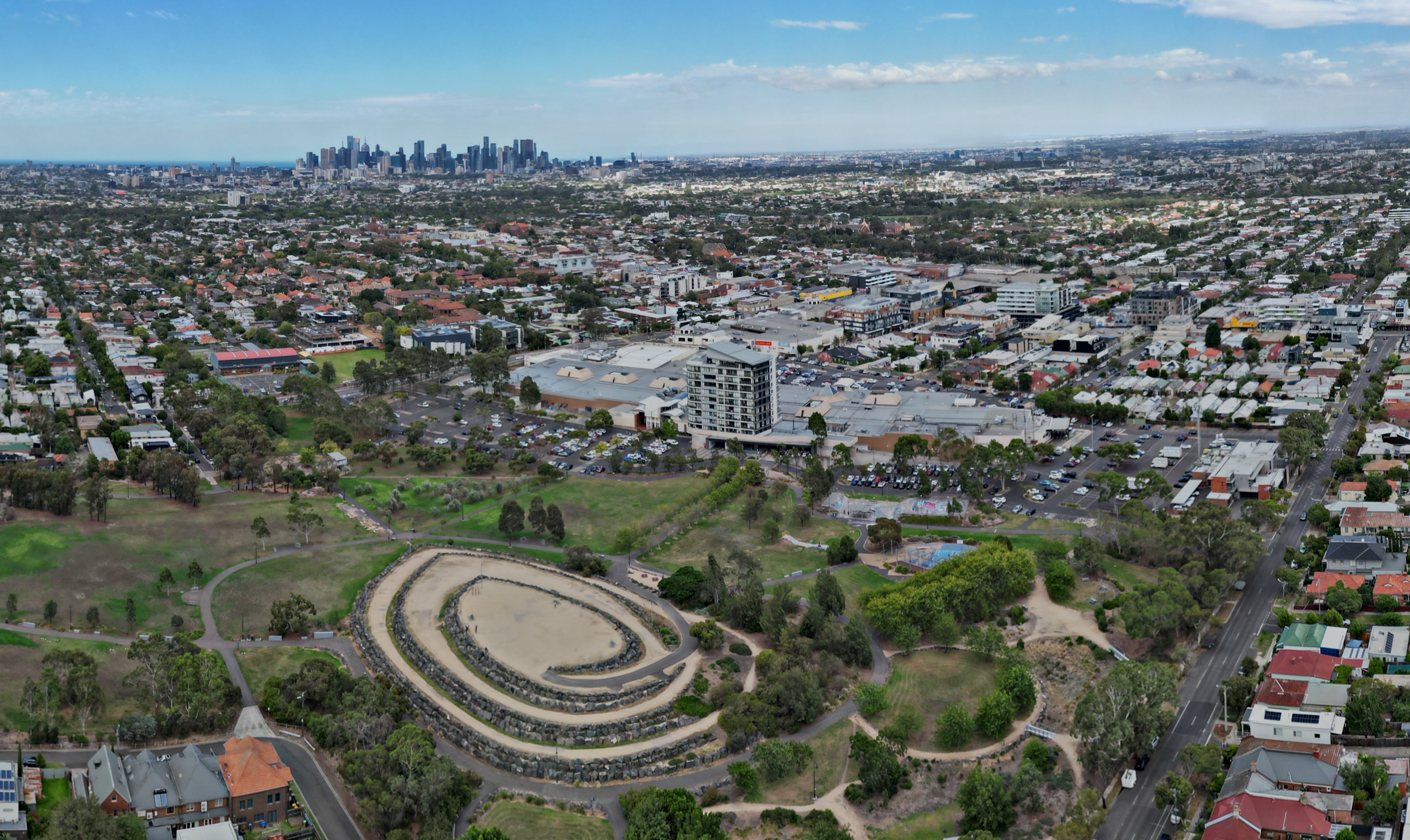
All Nations Park with Northcote Plaza in the background

Northcote, Victoria is located six kilometres north-west of Melbourne’s city centre. The land was colonised in the 1830s, before which the Wurundjeri people were indigenous to the area for over 30,000 years. It was a working-class industrial suburb and then underwent extensive gentrification, gaining high-income residents though retaining pockets of low-income residents. All Nations Park was created in 2002 atop a reclaimed landfill site and includes an Anzac memorial, lake, performance area, playground, skate park, and Indigenous gardens. At the time of the placement of the statue, the suburb had 25,000 residents.

The placement of the statue took place during a period of controversy around statues, with controversial statues and monuments in the United States, United Kingdom and Australia being taken down or damaged.

== History ==
=== First statue ===
On the night of 25 January 2020, the eve of Australia Day on 26 January, Golden Head was placed at the summit of All Nations Park, unsanctioned. No explanatory plaques or interpretive aids were placed, and it was positioned to face westward, toward the nearby Northcote Plaza shopping mall. The original Golden Head is around 1.5 metres (4.9 ft) tall in total. It takes the form of a life-sized head with smooth skin and tousled hair, made from poured concrete and painted gold. The figure can be described as androgenous, though is slightly masculine. It is mounted on a concrete plinth.

10 days after its appearance, on 6 February, Darebin Council workers removed the statue, wrapping it in bubble wrap, placing it in the back of a utility vehicle, and driving away. Following backlash online, the council made a statement that the statue had "fallen over in the night" and been damaged, being moved to storage in a secret location in Northcote by Darebin council's curatorial team due to safety risks. A second council statement acknowledged that the local community enjoyed the statue, promised that it was being treated "with the utmost care and respect", and called for the statue's artist to come forward, stating: "Council would love to chat with the artist/s to find a permanent home for the statue (the artist/s can remain anonymous)".

=== Following statues ===
Later, a second golden head, Golden Head II, was found buried nearby at All Nations Hill. Vandals kicked off the face of this sculpture, and it was quickly removed by the council. By July 2020 Sean Whelan, a local personality in the area, has been in contact with the artists though has never met them; he has stated that he believes the artists to be a collective.

On 14 March, a larger replica of the statue now known as Golden Head III was installed overnight in secret, this time heavier and bolted to a concrete slab. This was removed the next day by the council using a crane after cordoning it off with safety tape. Park staff allegedly replied to bystanders on site that the council were removing it as "They are not sure what he represents". On 16 March the council announced they had "begun the art acquisition process, to review the two statues through a professional art lens and assess them against Council’s art collection and commissioning priorities".

Following the removal of the second statue, an email dialogue was opened between the anonymous artists using a local resident as an intermediary, and a formal agreement was negotiated, leading to the reinstallation of the original Golden Head on 26 June. This reinstallation added a plaque, though with little context, as well as reinforced foundations to the statue. It was announced that the council would leave it in place for a year, before auctioning it to raise money for a local homelessess charity at the request of the artists. They stated that the artists provided a statement about the work but requested that this be kept confidential so as to allow it to remain open to interpretation.

On 6 December, vandals beheaded Golden Head III and stole the head. On 24 January 2021, another Golden Head, ostensibly female in appearance, appeared on the plinth of the second statue, and an identical version of this third statue appeared on Bin Chicken Island, Merri Creek in Coburg, Victoria the same weekend. At the same time, a different golden female statue was placed covertly in Heide Sculpture Park in Bulleen, though was quickly removed. On 5 August, the original Golden Head was auctioned online; the winning bid was A$3,200 and this money was donated by the artist's request to a refuge for Aboriginal women and children escaping family violence. Later in August, the female Golden Head in All Nations Park was removed.

A series of golden objects have appeared along St Georges Road in north Melbourne since the end of 2022, atop a black air valve cover. As of December 2024 there were 15 variations of these objects, beginning with a golden fan and including golden toilets and plungers, always with a short piece of written commentary. These have variably been destroyed or stolen. Golden depictions of the heads of women, also appeared in laneways around Northcote and Preston.

== Responses ==
Park visitors and residents responded to the works, and the presence of the statue drew additional visitors to All Nations Park.

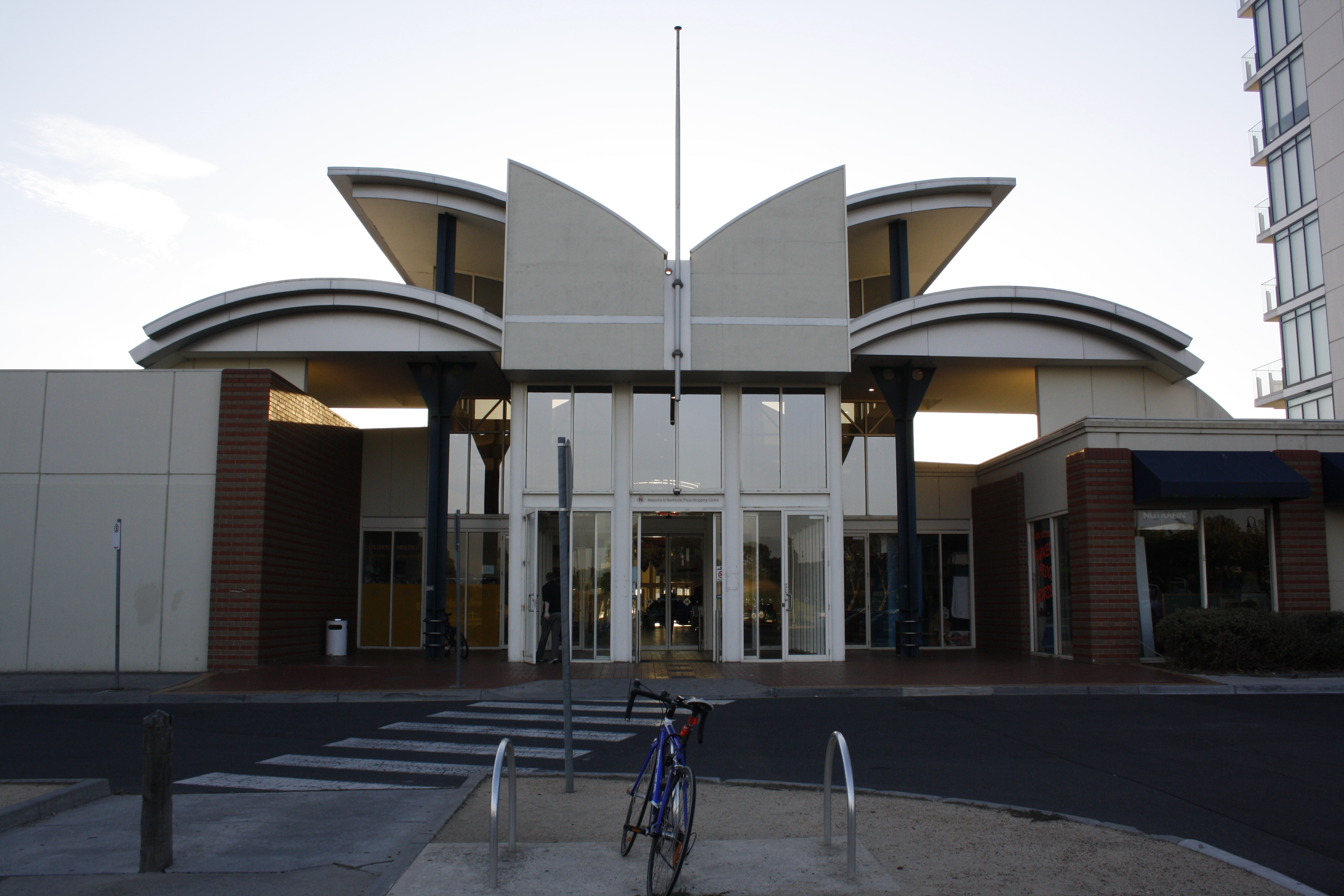
Entrance to Northcote Plaza

A Facebook group and loose online community, the Northcote Plaza Appreciation Society was established in October 2007 and as of 2021 had over 9000 members. The appearance of the statue in 2020 led to the group adopting it as their own and naming it Golden Head. Members visited the statue to take photos with it, and debated its provenance and meaning. Upon its removal on 6 February, witnesses posted live updates with images and footage to the group and fans called on Darebin Council to return the statue. The appearance of Golden Head III was celebrated by this community, though with some unhappy that it appeared different from the first statue. Its removal the next day led again to demands from the group that it be reinstated, and when this was granted for the original statue the community celebrated this once again. Through posting about the milestones of the Golden Head statues, those involved in the group created a communal narration of their story.

There was speculation on social media about the identities of the artists, with some suggesting Australian Cultural Terrorists who had claimed responsibility for 1986 theft of Picasso’s The Weeping Woman, and others drawing comparisons to Banksy. Further speculation was upon the resemblance of the statues to individuals such as David Bowie, Lou Reed, Justin Timberlake, Spock, Jon Snow, Alain Cuny, Vince Colosimo, Dylan Lewis, Douglas Nicholls, Tyler Cassidy, the complainant from episode 12, series 6 of Judge Judy, and the teenager who cracked an egg on the head of Fraser Anning known as Egg Boy.

Also online, users began framing the statues as a community protector, ruler or, comediacally, a deity. They made use of the statue to spread messages of public safety during early COVID-19 lockdowns in Melbourne, taking photographs of it wearing a face mask. They also dressed up the statue in other outfits, including a cape, a denim jacket, sunglasses, scarves, a plastic horned helmet popularly associated with Vikings, and an Aboriginal flag. Internet memes were used extensively. Some users referred to the statue as Golden Boy or GB for short, with some referring to it with the pronoun 'he' and correcting those who use the pronoun 'it'. In photographs, Golden Head is framed as an integral part of the local landscape.
