= Peter Gibaud =

Australian cricketer

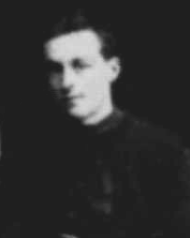

Personal information
- Born: 1 May 1892; Melbourne, Australia
- Died: 29 July 1963 (aged 71); Northcote, Victoria, Australia

Domestic team information
- Years: Team
- 1929: Victoria
- Source: Cricinfo, 21 November 2015

Peter Gibaud (1 May 1892 – 29 July 1963) was an Australian cricketer. He played one first-class cricket match for Victoria in 1929.

== See also ==
- List of Victoria first-class cricketers
