= George Smith Duncan =

New Zealand engineer (1852–1930)

George Smith Duncan (11 July 1852 – 4 September 1930) was a tramway and mining engineer best known for his work on cable trams, and for his work in the gold mining industry.

Duncan was born on 11 July 1852 in the city of Dunedin New Zealand, the third son of George and Elspet Duncan, recent Scottish immigrants. He was educated at Clifton College near Bristol in England, and at both the University of Edinburgh in Scotland and the University of Otago in New Zealand. He was subsequently appointed engineer for the District of Otago.

On 1 September 1876, with John Reid and James W. Duncan, the partnership, 'Reid and Duncans', Surveyors, Civil Engineers, Land Agents, and Share and Money Brokers was formed, with offices at Moray Place, Dunedin.

Between 1879 and 1883, Duncan was responsible for the development of the Dunedin cable tramway system. He was then appointed consulting engineer (and subsequently engineer) for the development of the Melbourne cable tramway system in Australia, a post he held until 1892, being largely responsible for the development of over 44 miles of cable tram route.

Shortly after leaving his post in Melbourne, Duncan travelled to both America and Europe. Whilst in London he was elected a Member of the Institution of Civil Engineers for his efforts on the Melbourne cable tramway system. However what he saw on his travels lead him to question the future of cable tramways, and on his return to Australia he advised Brisbane against adopting such a system in favour of electric traction.

From 1894, Duncan became involved in the gold mining industry of Victoria, introducing the cyanide process for extracting gold from ore and mine tailings, and founding the firm of Duncan, Noyes & Co. He later became involved in experiments to extract gold from seawater, and achieved this in 1912 from the waters of Port Phillip. He continued to experiment until shortly before his death, but failed in his aim of making the process economically viable.

He died at "Sunnyside", Black Rock, Victoria, Australia on 4 September 1930.

== Sources ==
- Web page http://www.hawthorntramdepot.org.au/papers/duncan.htm, as retrieved 12:00 GMT, 28 September 2011.
