= Little Sisters of the Poor Home for the Aged (Melbourne, Victoria) =

Heritage-listed former aged care facility in Melbourne, Victoria, Australia

Little Sisters of the Poor Home for the Aged (former)
- Location of the former aged care facility in Greater Metropolitan Melbourne

General information
- Status: Completed
- Type: Aged care facility (1890–2001); Greek Orthodox monastery (since 2001– )
- Architectural style: Elizabethan and French Romanesque Revival
- Location: 104–112 St Georges Road, Northcote, City of Darebin, Melbourne, Victoria, Australia
- Coordinates: 37°46′18″S 144°59′33″E
- Year built: 1890–1909
- Completed: 1909
- Opened: 1890; 136 years ago

Technical details
- Material: Stucco; bricks; timber

Design and construction
- Architects: Leonard Flanagan (1890); James Curtin (1896); Kempson and Connolly (1909)
- Main contractor: Robert Gamlin (1890)

Victorian Heritage Register
- Official name: Little Sisters of the Poor Home for the Aged
- Type: Registered place
- Designated: 1 November 2001
- Reference no.: H1950
- Heritage overlay no.: HO175
- Categories: Religion; Health Services

Register of the National Estate
- Official name: Little Sisters of the Poor Building (former)
- Type: Defunct register
- Designated: 21 November 2000
- Reference no.: 15578

The Little Sisters of the Poor Home for the Aged is a former aged care facility, now Greek Orthodox monastery, located at 104–112 St Georges Road in Northcote, in the City of Darebin, in the northern suburbs of Melbourne, in Victoria, Australia.

Built in 1890 on the traditional lands of the Wurundjeri Woi-wurrung people, the house was added to the Victorian Heritage Register on 1 November 2001 in recognition of its historical, architectural, and social significance; and was also added to non-statutory lists by the Victorian branch of the National Trust on 24 June 1982 and the now defunct Register of the National Estate on 21 November 2000.

== History ==
Members of the French Catholic order, the Little Sisters of the Poor, arrived in Melbourne in 1884 at the invitation of the first Catholic Archbishop of Melbourne James Gould OSA. After setting up temporary premises in Fitzroy, the Little Sisters established a permanent home in timber buildings at Northcote. In 1888 a fundraising appeal was launched to construct a substantial brick building on a conspicuous and elevated site, in response to the increasing demand for accommodation for the aged. Designed by architect Leonard Flanagan, (Note: Sometimes incorrectly spelled as Flannagan.) the new building in an Elizabethan Revival style.

The first stage – the southern wing – opened in 1890, built by Robert Gamlin. The building was extended northward in 1896 by day labour under the direction of architect James Curtin, and the chapel and mortuary were constructed. While the extension followed Flannagan’s original concept, the internal layout and the front verandah detailing differed. In 1909 the last stage of the building was constructed, to a design by architects Kempson and Connolly. An earlier iron perimeter fence was replaced with a brick fence in 1912.

When the first stage was completed, ninety elderly residents were admitted in just 18 days. By 1890, the number had grown to 200, and by 1892, over 300 elderly people—many of them destitute after the gold rush—were in care.

The building, with later extensions to the east and west, remained in use as a home for the aged until the 1980s when the Little Sisters of the Poor subdivided the site and built the new St Joseph's Home for the Aged on the southern section of the site. The remaining land containing the original buildings was sold in c. 2001 to the Melbourne Diocese of the Greek Orthodox Church for use as their only monastery outside Greece, known as the Axion Estin Greek Monastery.

== Description ==
The main building is among Victoria's largest single nineteenth century charitable buildings to be inspired by Elizabethan and French Romanesque styles and among the largest surviving structures built for charitable purposes. Both the size and architectural style of the building, with its steeply pitched gabled roofs, successfully combine to create visual massiveness to what is essentially a three level building. The style and massing of the building were effectively maintained by different architects over two decades of development. The vestigial remaining sections of the 1860s and 1880s timber buildings are of considerable interest and possess rarity value as early surviving timber structures. The main building is a local landmark visible for some distance, owing to its elevated site, its distinctive gables and its massing. It is therefore an important element in the local townscape.

The three-storey building is of stuccoed brick with loggias on each floor formed by arches supported on cast iron columns, the spaces under being filled in with balustrading. The mid-1890s additions were described by contemporaries as 'built in the Romanesque style of architecture in the plainest manner, all unnecessary ornamentation being avoided, more attention being given to provide a solid and substantial building'. The St Justin's wing of 1908-09 was constructed two storeys high with an additional basement storey under the front portion for a third of its length. This building was constructed of brick with concrete footings, the whole being cement plastered externally with architectural treatment, in keeping with the old building.

The building as a whole has an Elizabethan character, with French Romanesque influence evident, and this style, together with the building's massive scale and elevated siting, are highly significant. The original plan by Flannagan was faithfully followed by the later architects. Particularly distinctive features are the steep parapeted gables which add greater visual substance to what was essentially a three level building. It is this roofline of the main building which is visible above the urban periphery, especially from along Park Street and it provides variety of scale among the small scale buildings surrounding it. Chimneys are tall and decorated and there are small bell towers and vents to the roof as well. There is decoration to the eaves, and buttresses confined mainly to the lower floor. Portions of the timber cottage at the south of the main building may date from 1865 when Brown had his farmhouse there; however substantial renovation has taken place and little original material remains. The wooden chapel may date from 1885 but has been relocated and a verandah added c. 1910. Despite these sorts of changes, the timber structures retain significance for their early date.

The main building is now owned and occupied by the Greek Orthodox Church and is significant as the Church's only monastery outside Greece. This reflects the size of Melbourne's Greek population and its concentration in the north-western suburbs. The continuing use of the complex for religious purposes contributes to its significance.

== See also ==
- Architecture of Melbourne
- Aged care in Australia
- List of places on the Victorian Heritage Register in the City of Darebin
