= 186–192 Clarke Street, Northcote =

Heritage-listed series of terrace houses in Melbourne, Victoria, Australia

- Location of the terrace houses in Greater Metropolitan Melbourne

General information
- Status: Completed
- Type: Terrace houses
- Architectural style: Victorian
- Location: 186–192 Clarke Street, Northcote, City of Darebin, Melbourne, Victoria, Australia
- Coordinates: 37°46′37″S 144°59′55″E
- Completed: 1888; 138 years ago
- Client: William Harrison

Technical details
- Material: Bricks; stucco; timber; cast iron

Victorian Heritage Register
- Official name: Terrace Houses
- Type: Registered place
- Designated: 18 February 1999
- Reference no.: H1774
- Heritage overlay no.: HO19
- Category: Residential buildings (private)

Register of the National Estate
- Official name: Terrace Houses, 186 - 192 Clarke St, Northcote
- Type: Defunct register
- Designated: undated
- Reference no.: 101643

186–192 Clarke Street is a series of four terrace houses located at 186–192 Clarke Street in Northcote, in the City of Darebin, in the northern suburbs of Melbourne, in Victoria, Australia.

Built in 1888 on the traditional lands of the Wurundjeri Woi-wurrung people, the row of houses was added to the Victorian Heritage Register on 18 February 1999 in recognition of its architectural and historical significance; and was also added to a non-statutory list by the Victorian branch of the National Trust on 6 July 1998. and the now defunct Register of the National Estate on an unknown date.

== Description ==
The row of four Victorian terrace houses was constructed in bi-chromatic brickwork by William Harrison in 1888 on the brow of Rucker's Hill. The terrace is built into the hill such that it is two storey to the street and three storey to the rear. The building overlooks the flat below where, in the 1880s, George Plant established a trotting track and where the Northcote Cricket Club once played.

The rear of the terrace row is unusual for its architectural detailing with parapets and verandahs echoing the front northern elevation. Internally each of the houses possesses a staircase which formerly led onto the roof. This arrangement is said to have been connected with viewing the trotting activities on the course below. The terrace is in good condition with alterations being confined mainly to a single-storey modern addition to the rear of each. Some parapet and cast iron decoration is missing, there has been some infilling or glazing of rear verandahs, and the front facades have been painted.

Each of the four lots are set on approximately 215 square metres (2,310 sq ft), with frontage to Clarke Street of approximately 5 metres (16 ft), and extend approximately 50 metres (160 ft) from front to rear.

== See also ==
- Architecture of Melbourne
- List of places on the Victorian Heritage Register in the City of Darebin
- Terrace houses in Australia
