= Thornbury, Victoria =

Thornbury
- Suburb
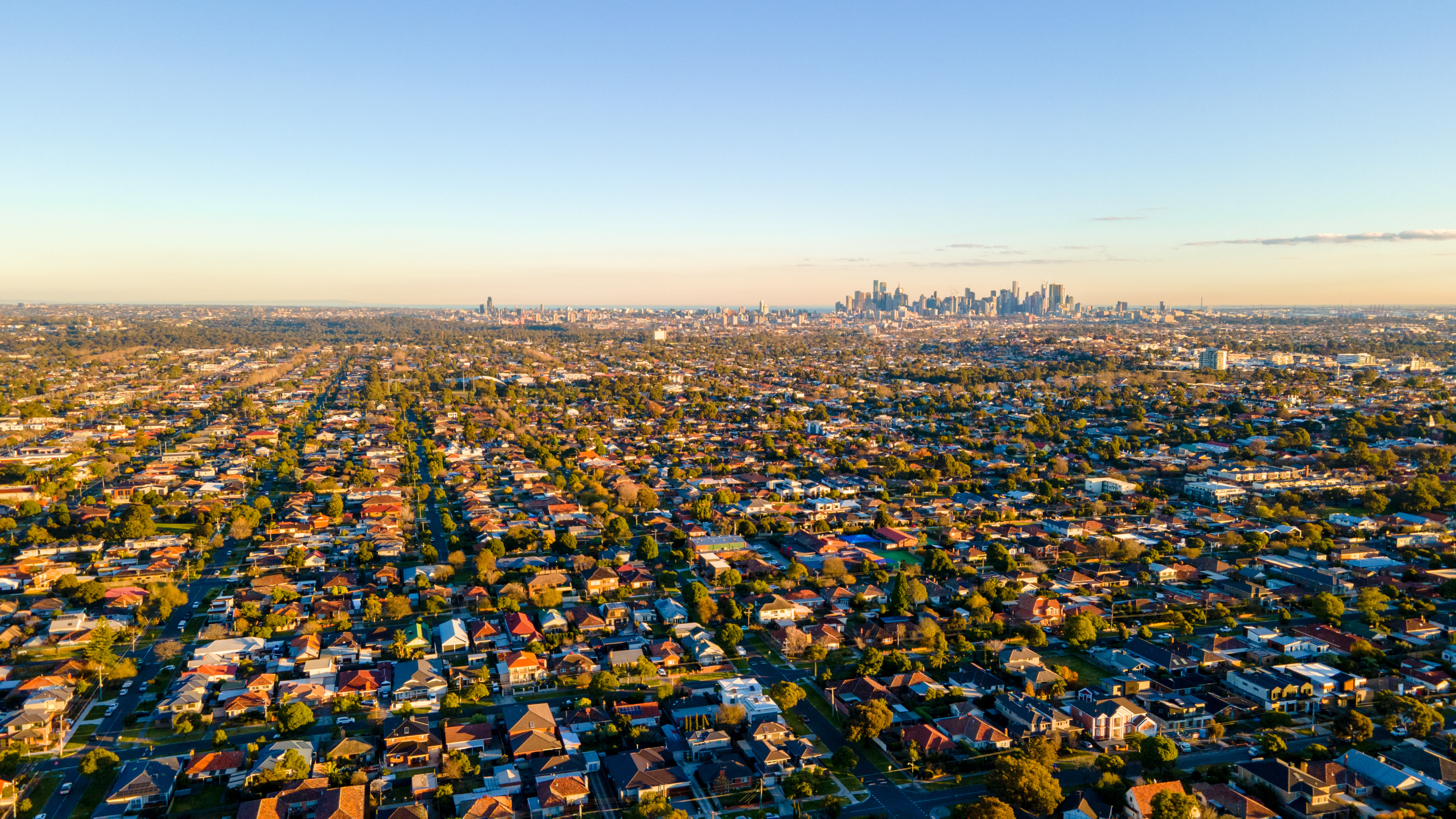
- View of Thornbury from above looking towards the Melbourne CBD

- Interactive map of Thornbury
- Coordinates: 37.760°S 145.007°E
- Country: Australia
- State: Victoria
- City: Melbourne
- LGA: City of Darebin
- Location: 7 km (4.3 mi) NE of Melbourne

Government
  - State electorate: Northcote
  - Federal division: Cooper

Area
  - Total: 5.2 km^{2} (2.0 sq mi)
- Elevation: 69 m (226 ft)

Population
  - Total: 19,005 (2021 census)
  - Density: 3,650/km^{2} (9,470/sq mi)
- Postcode: 3071
Suburbs around Thornbury
Coburg	Preston	Bellfield
Coburg	Thornbury	Ivanhoe
Brunswick East	Northcote	Fairfield

Thornbury (/ˈθɔːrnbəri/) is an inner-city suburb in Melbourne, Victoria, Australia, 7 km (4.3 mi) north-east of Melbourne's Central Business District, located within the City of Darebin local government area. Thornbury recorded a population of 19,005 at the 2021 census.

Thornbury is bordered by the Merri Creek to the west, and the Darebin Creek to the east. The heart of Thornbury is known as Thornbury Village, and is located at the centre of Thornbury, at the intersection of High Street and Normanby Avenue/Clarendon Street.

Thornbury is shaped as a thin strip of land sandwiched between Northcote and Preston. Its east–west distance is four times its north–south distance. For 111 years, Thornbury was part of the former City of Northcote local government area, which existed from 1883 until June 1994. As such, Thornbury is understood to be a former bridesmaid suburb of Northcote, similar to the commercial and demographic satellite, Westgarth, although the latter does not have its own postcode.

In the 2021 census, the most common ancestries were English 29.7%, Australian 24.8%, Irish 14.1%, Italian 12.6% and Greek 10.9%%. 70.5% of people were born in Australia with other common countries of birth being Greece 4.2%, England 2.9%, Italy 2.9%, and New Zealand 2.2%. Most common languages, other than English spoken at home are Greek 8.0%, Italian 4.2%, Arabic 1.7%, Mandarin 1.1% and Vietnamese 1.0%.

== Etymology ==
The area's name is derived from the name of a property of early settler, Jobbo Smith, with the name dating to 1850. Smith named his property after a farm near his English birthplace.

== History ==
High Street had a cable tram by 1890. This ran the length of High Street from Northcote to Preston. By 1901, a railway line to its west connected to the central city line. The cable tram engine house was built in 1890, with the building still existing on 628 High Street. It contained both the engine house and the car shed.

St Mary's Catholic Church was built in 1916.

=== Heritage listings ===
The following places in Thornbury are listed on the Victorian Heritage Register:

- Northcote Cable Tramways site, 626–628 High Street
- Yan Yean Water Supply System, through Bundoora, Reservoir, Preston, Thornbury, and Northcote

== Geography ==
Thornbury's geology mainly consists of Silurian sedimentary rocks of the Melbourne Formation (formerly Dargile). River sediments overlay parts of the folded Silurian rocks, especially near Merri Creek and Darebin Creek that represent the western and eastern borders of the suburb respectively. A small exposed outcrop of basalt, known colloquially as "Mount Thornbury", forms a perceptable peak mid way between these two watercourses.

=== Urban structure ===
An area of Thornbury, referred to as the Thornbury Park Estate Precinct, consists of a mix of housing built in the Victorian era, late Federation and the interwar period. After a backlash from residents about the proposed demolition of a 1920s Church Manse on Comas Grove in particular, the local council established a temporary heritage overlay, protecting the buildings. Old buildings, some 100 years old, were regularly being demolished and replaced with newer buildings, and in some cases, apartments. The Thornbury Park Estate Precinct - Proposed Heritage Overlay established temporary protection, initiated in April 2022, and saved houses in the area from demolition

== Economy ==
The main commercial area in Thornbury is the High Street shopping strip, centred on Thornbury Village. Smaller shopping precincts are to be found on sections of St Georges Road, Wales Street and Station Street. The Northcote Pottery, founded in 1897 at Clyde Street, was closed in 2007.

Thornbury has a long line of industry near Dundas Street (the border between Thornbury and Preston) and Station Street. It consists mainly of warehouses and scrap metal yards, with a few metal recycling centres and factories.

== Transport ==
=== Active transport ===
The Merri Creek Trail and Darebin Creek Trail run on the west and east boundaries of Thornbury respectively, and are popular shared-use recreational paths used by cyclists and walkers.

=== Public transport ===
==== Train ====
Thornbury is served by one railway station: Thornbury, on the Mernda line.

==== Tram ====
Two tram routes service Thornbury, both operated by Yarra Trams:

- : West Preston – Victoria Harbour (Docklands)
- : Bundoora RMIT – Waterfront City (Docklands)

==== Bus ====
Seven bus routes service Thornbury:

- 250 : Melbourne CBD (Queen Street) – La Trobe University. Operated by Kinetic Melbourne.
- 251 : Melbourne CBD (Queen Street) – Northland Shopping Centre. Operated by Kinetic Melbourne.
- 350 : Melbourne CBD (Queen Street) – La Trobe University via the Eastern Freeway. Operated by Kinetic Melbourne.
- 510 : Essendon station – Ivanhoe station via Brunswick West, Moreland station, Thornbury and Fairfield. Operated by Kinetic Melbourne.
- 552 : North East Reservoir – Northcote Plaza via High Street. Operated by Dysons.
- 553 : Preston – West Preston via Reservoir. Operated by Dysons.
- 567 : Northcote – Regent station via Northland Shopping Centre. Operated by Dysons.

== Education ==
- Thornbury Primary School (Opened 2 August 1915)
- Wales Street Primary School (opened 1 October 1891 as the 'Prince of Wales Park State School')
- Penders Grove Primary School
- Thornbury High School (Renamed from Thornbury-Darebin Secondary College in 2005)
- Holy Spirit School (Catholic) (Opened 3 February 1953)
- St. Mary's Primary school (Catholic) (Opened January 1920)
- Virtual School Victoria (VSV) which is a Department of Education distance and virtual school and is the largest school in the state, delivering education from Foundation to Year 12 to over 5000 students. VSV offers both the VCE and VCE-VM.
- The Victorian School of Languages (VSL) was also located in Thornbury until it relocated to Collingwood in 2025.
- Nestoras Greek College

== Sports ==
The Darebin International Sports Centre (DISC) is located in the John Cain Memorial Park, near the Darebin Creek in Thornbury. The Darebin International Sports Centre is the home of Football Federation Victoria, the State Football Centre (soccer), the State Lawn Bowls Centre and the State Cycling Centre, a velodrome with a 250m indoor timber cycling track. The Northcote Public Golf Course, run by the Northcote Golf Club, is located near the Merri Creek. It is also home to Flinders Park and the Holy Trinity Cricket Club (HTCC).

== Parks and gardens ==
- Strettle Wetland (Merri Creek)
- Northcote Municipal Golf Links
- Mayer Park
- Sir Douglas Nichols Reserve
- Penders Park (Electric barbecues, playground)
- Hayes Park (Oval)
- John Cain Memorial Park (Including the Darebin International Sports Centre facilities, four soccer fields, the State Cycling Centre velodrome and the State Lawn Bowls Centre)
- Clyde Jones Reserve (Playground and Grassy Area)
- Henderson Park
- Turner Reserve

== Notable people ==
- Vince Colosimo – actor and TV personality
- Jane Hall – actor and radio personality
- Bill Lawry — Australian former cricketer and commentator
- Normie Rowe – singer and TV personality

== See also ==
- City of Northcote – Thornbury was previously within this former local government area.
