= Northcote Theatre =

Building in Melbourne, Australia

- Exterior of the theatre

- Location of the venue in Greater Metropolitan Melbourne
- Interactive map of Northcote Theatre
- Former names: Northcote Picture Theatre
- Address: 212–220 High Street, Northcote, City of Darebin, Melbourne, Victoria; Australia
- Coordinates: 37°46′26″S 144°59′55″E
- Operator: Northcote Theatre Company (1912–1960); Northcote Social Club (since 2022)
- Seating type: Raked seating (1912–1960); Raked standing room (since 2022)
- Capacity: 1,500 (as a cinema)
- Type: Independent movie theatre (1912–1960); Live independent venue (since 2022)

Construction
- Built: 1911–1912
- Opened: 1912; 114 years ago
- Years active: 1912–1960 (as a cinema); 1960–c. 2000s (function centre); since 2022– (live music venue)
- Cost: A£10,000
- Architectural style: Edwardian Baroque
- Architects: Edward Twentyman Jr; F. G. Richardson

Website
- northcotetheatre.com
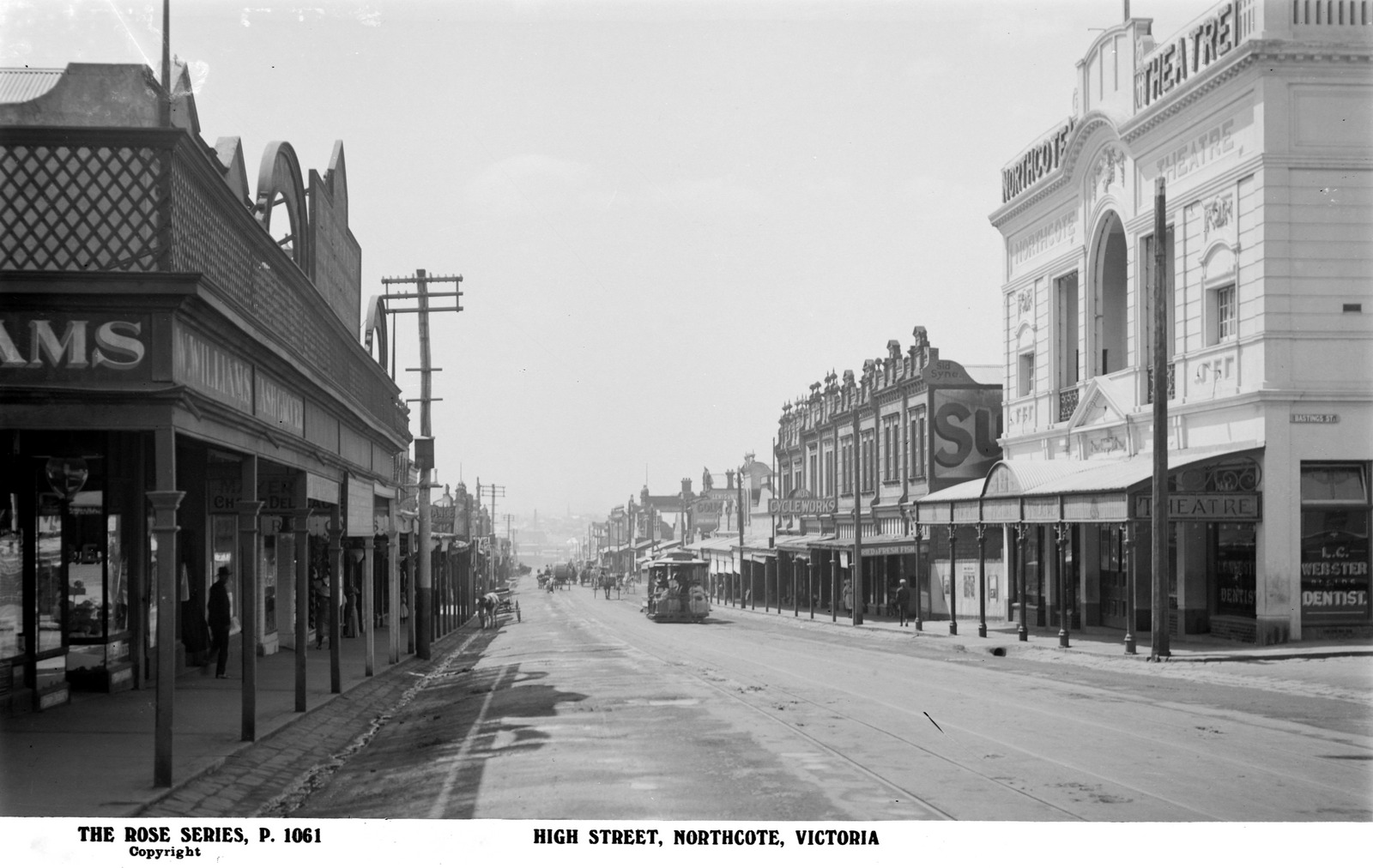
- View of High Street, with the theatre on the right

Victorian Heritage Register
- Official name: Former Northcote Theatre
- Type: Registered place
- Designated: 9 June 2011
- Reference no.: H2287
- Heritage overlay no.: HO312
- Category: Recreation and Entertainment

The Northcote Theatre is a live independent venue, formerly an independent movie theatre, located at 212–220 High Street in Northcote, in the City of Darebin, in the northern suburbs of Melbourne, in Victoria, Australia.

Built between 1911 and 1912 on the traditional lands of the Wurundjeri Woi-wurrung people, the former cinema was added to the Victorian Heritage Register on 9 June 2011 in recognition of its historical significance; and was also added to a non-statutory list by the Victorian branch of the National Trust on November 1993.

The building is notable for being the oldest purpose-built cinema in Melbourne, which opened in 1912 as the Northcote Picture Theatre. It was previously a dance studio and reception centre, before it was converted into a music venue in 2022. Since re-opening as a live music venue, international acts have played at the venue, including Charli XCX, Bright Eyes, and 100 Gecs.

== History ==
The Northcote Theatre Company, operated by Robert McLeish, was registered in December 1911, with Amalgamated Picture Company Ltd as the principal shareholder. The cinema was opened on 27 June 1912 by the Mayor of Northcote, Councillor H. E. Bastings, in front of a crowded auditorium. Described by The Argus as a handsome structure, it was designed by local architect Edward Twentyman Jr and F. G. Richardson in a simple Edwardian Baroque style.

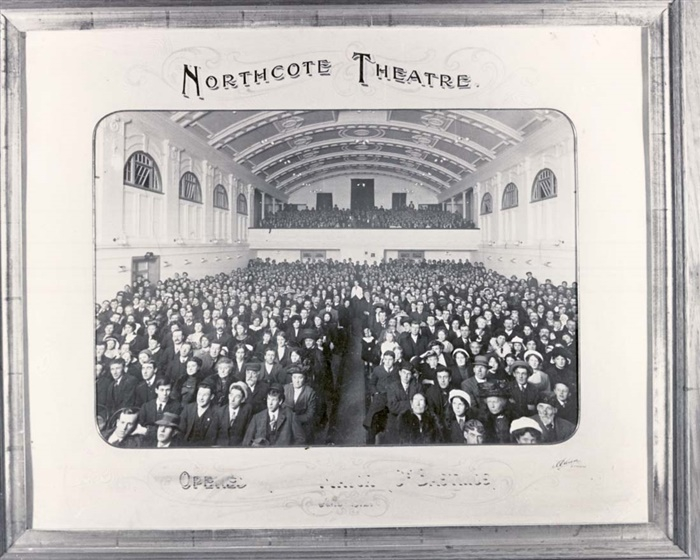
The interior of the theatre in 1912

Constructed for a cost of A£10,000, the theatre had its own electricity generator, and as such was the first building in Northcote to be lighted by electricity. While the primary purpose of the venue was film, it had a flat floor and a raised stage that could be used for a variety of functions. In the mid-1930s, seating on the dress circle was widened and, in 1953, the central arch and balcony, which opened onto the dress circle, was enclosed. It was operational as a cinema until 1960, after which time it was used as a dance studio and then as a function centre.

In October 2021, the City of Darebin granted a permit the building to be converted into a live music venue, despite some opposition from residents. Andrew Mansfield, the co-founder of the Northcote Social Club, became the operator of the venue, which opened in July 2022. The ground floor contains a bar called High Note, that opened in 2023.

== Description ==
The theatre is a rare, substantially intact example of an early purpose-built theatre in Victoria. It has a small, simple foyer; large, box-like auditorium with a barrel vault ceiling, flat floor and raised stage that could be used for a variety of functions; an area of balcony seating; windows making it suitable for use for daytime functions; and perfunctory, but intact, interior embellishment. The 'attractive' auditorium seated 1,500 patrons on two levels with a slight rake, and is decorated with pilasters and wreaths. The stage and fly-tower provided for live theatre productions, though the building's main use was for cinema.

Externally, the theatre's simple Edwardian Baroque style decoration is substantially intact. The theatre has a cantilevered awning, which replaced the original verandah, and four shops at entrance level. The facade features a balustraded parapet, rustication at first floor level and the words 'Northcote Theatre' embossed above the windows. The three openings of the original dress circle balcony were enclosed.

=== In popular culture ===
The theatre was used as the setting for the 1952 musical comedy film Night Club.

== See also ==
- Architecture of Melbourne
- List of music venues in Melbourne
- List of places on the Victorian Heritage Register in the City of Darebin
