= Melbourne cable tramway system =

Cable car public transport system in Melbourne, Australia

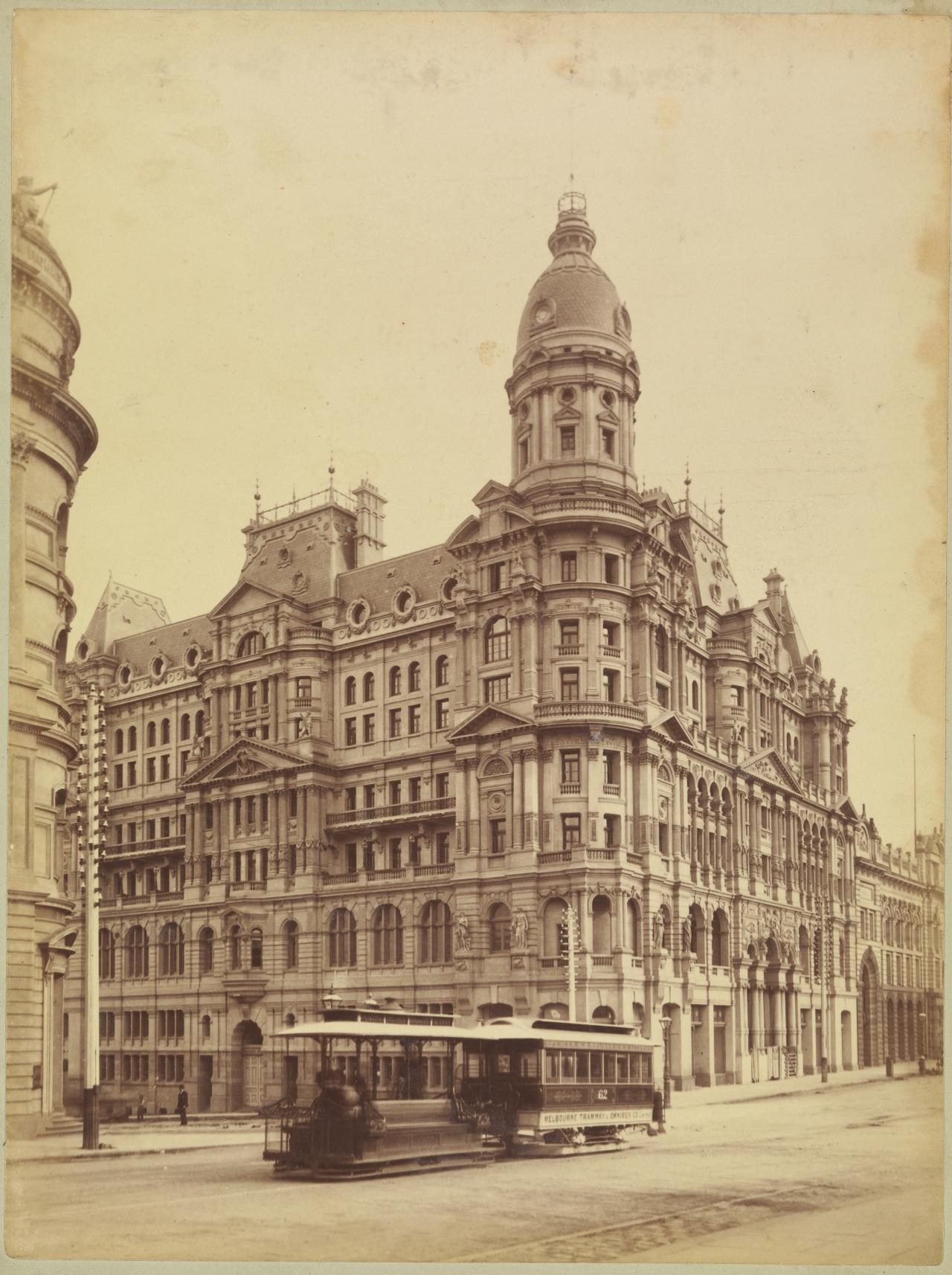
A tram car passes the Federal Coffee Palace at the south-west corner of Collins and King Streets, c1890.

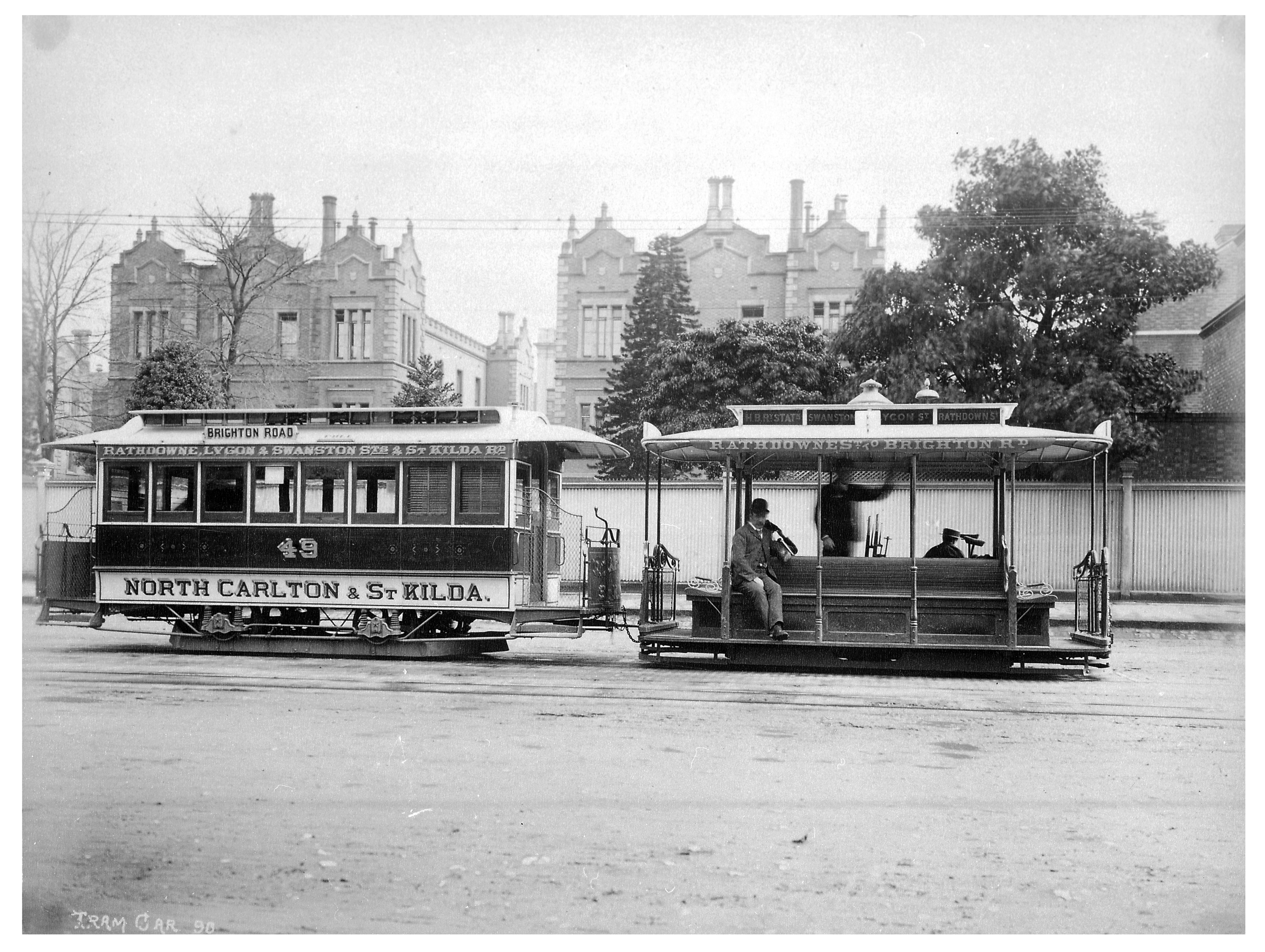
Cable tram dummy and trailer on the St Kilda Line in Lonsdale Street, 1905

The Melbourne cable tramway system was a cable pulled tram public transport system in Melbourne, Australia, which operated between 1885 and 1940.

The first line, from Spencer Street to the end of Bridge Road Richmond via Flinders Street, was opened on 11 November 1885, and all planned lines were built by 1891, the last being the short Windsor-St Kilda Esplanade line, opened 17 October 1891. By then it had about 75 kilometres (47 mi) of double track (103.2 route km or 64.12 route miles) and 1,200 cars and trailers, on 15 routes radiating from the centre of Melbourne to neighbouring suburbs. It was one of the largest cable car systems in the world, comparable with those of San Francisco which had 23 lines, and Chicago which had 66.0 km of double track.

The system was the brainchild of Francis Boardman Clapp, an American emigrant who had arrived during the gold rushes of the 1850s, and established horse omnibus services in Melbourne in the 1870s. He was inspired by the first cable tram system, beginning in 1873 in San Francisco, and developed by Andrew Hallidie to cope with the steep hills that horse trams found difficult. Clapp's efforts led to the passing of the Melbourne Tramway & Omnibus Company Act 1883, which established the Melbourne Tramway Trust, consisting of representatives of the 12 local councils served by the proposed system, which bought land, laid the tracks, and built the cable winding power-houses. Clapp's Melbourne Tramway & Omnibus Company (MTOC) was granted an exclusive 30-year franchise arrangement with the Victorian Government, and operated and managed the services.

On the expiration of the MTOC's franchise in 1916, the cable tram network returned to the Victorian Government, and then passed to the government-owned Melbourne & Metropolitan Tramways Board (MMTB) on 1 November 1919.

Although the first electric tram service was introduced in 1889, and ran for seven years between the outer Melbourne suburbs of Box Hill and Doncaster, the electric tram network did not seriously commence until 1906, when the Victorian Railways built an "Electric Street Railway" from St Kilda railway station to Brighton, and The North Melbourne Electric Tramway & Lighting Company built an electric tramway towards Essendon from the terminus of the cable system. From 1924 the cable tram lines were progressively converted to electric traction. The last Melbourne cable tram ran on 26 October 1940, on the Northcote to Bourke Street route. Three routes were converted to bus rather than electrified. The cable tram routes were generally folded into the existing electric routes, creating the basis for the system still in use today.

== Cable tram routes ==
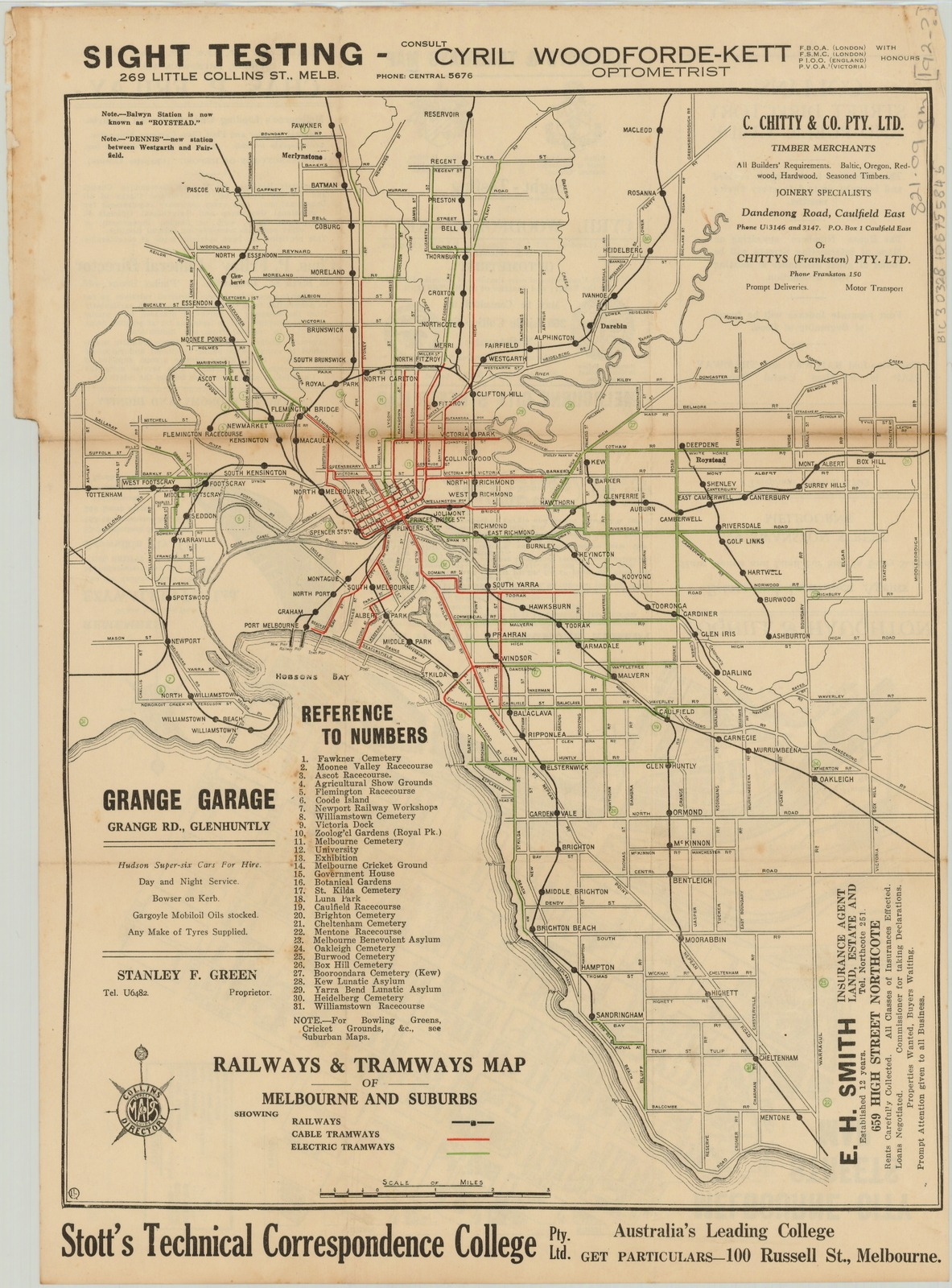
Melbourne Train and Tram routes 1924. Cable tram routes are shown in red.

Most lines ran from the city straight out into the suburbs, though some then proceeded across town, such that some lines crossed each other, creating some choice of routes. The lines along St Kilda Road and Swanston Street crossed right through the city, and Windsor - St Kilda lines initially ran separately.

=== Richmond Line (1885-1927) ===
The Richmond line opened on 11 November 1885, and ran between Hawthorn Bridge, Richmond, and Spencer Street, City via Flinders Street. A horse tram also operated by the MTOC connected on the other side of the bridge into Hawthorn.

The line was converted to electric traction in stages. The line was at first truncated to Swanston Street on 15 May 1927, the rest of the line closing on 29 June 1927. The converted line between Swanston Street and Spencer Street opened on 14 July 1927. The section between Swanston Street and Simpson Street opened on 17 September 1927, and the rest of the line to Hawthorn Bridge opened later that year on 4 December, connecting with the Church Street line and the Burwood Road line, which were already in operation. This conversion enabled Mont Albert and East Kew trams to reach the city directly. The powerhouse was located on Bridge Road, at Hoddle Street, and has since been demolished to provide for a left-turn lane. The remains of the Richmond cable tram depot now form part of the Amora Hotel, near Hawthorn Bridge.

=== North Fitzroy Line (1886-1930) ===
The North Fitzroy line opened on 2 October 1886, and ran between North Fitzroy terminus on St Georges Road at Barkly Street, via Brunswick Street and to Spencer Street via Collins Street. The line was converted to electric traction in stages. The North Fitzroy Line was truncated to Brunswick Street on 14 September 1929. The line was eventually fully closed on 12 July 1930. The Collins Street section was converted to electric traction and opened on 8 December 1929. The line between Brunswick Street and North Fitzroy was reopened on 26 October 1930. This conversion enabled a direct route for West Preston and East Preston electric trams to reach the city, rather than using the Holden Street line. The powerhouse was located on the north-east corner of Victoria Parade and Brunswick Street. The car shed was located at Holden Street near the North Fitzroy terminus.

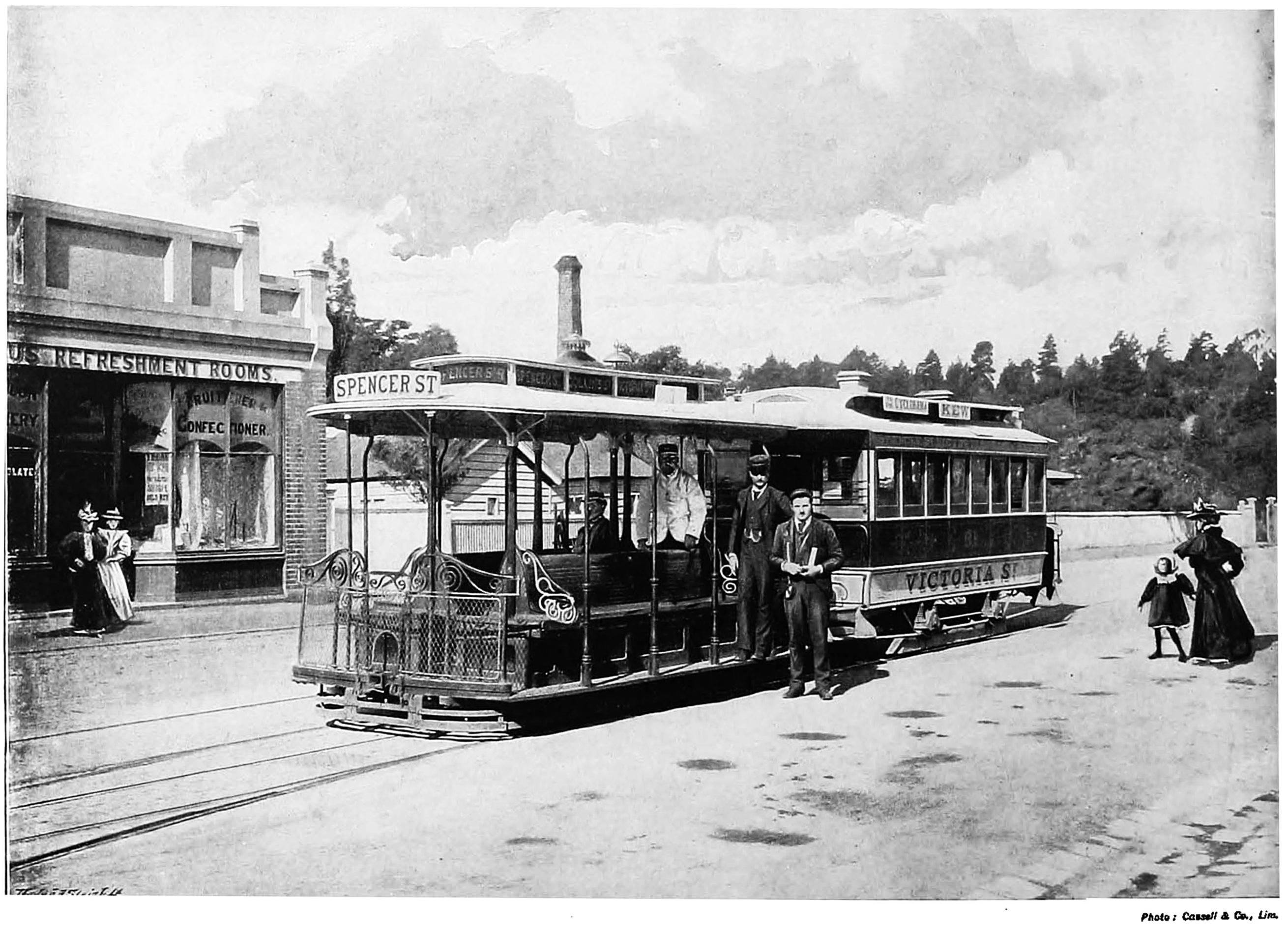
A cable tram at the Victoria Bridge terminus of the Collingwood Line.

=== Victoria Bridge Line (1886-1929) ===
The Victoria Bridge line opened on 22 November 1886, diverting from the North Fitzroy Line along Victoria Parade to Victoria Bridge (at the end of Victoria Street), Richmond. A horse tram also operated by the MTOC connected on the other side of the bridge into Kew.

The line was closed on 13 July 1929 for conversion to electric traction between Victoria Bridge and Brunswick Street. This section reopened on 15 September 1929, providing a second route for East Kew and Mont Albert electric trams to reach the city (along with Bridge Road). The rest of the Collins Street line was converted to electric traction and reopened on 8 December 1929. The powerhouse was located on the north-east corner of Victoria Parade and Brunswick Street. The car shed was located on Victoria Street near the Victoria Bridge terminus.

=== Clifton Hill Line (1887-1940) ===
The Clifton Hill line opened on 10 August 1887, and ran from the end of Queens Parade in Clifton Hill to the City via Smith Street, Gertrude, and Nicholson Streets, then along Bourke Street. When the Clifton Hill - Northcote line opened in 1890, it interchanged with the Clifton Hill line at its southern terminus. Passengers initially had to physically walk between the two lines for a through service. When the Melbourne & Metropolitan Tramways Board took over the line in 1925, the two lines were connected together and a through-service was established between Northcote and the city (Bourke Street). The combined Clifton Hill/Northcote line was among the last cable lines to close (along with the Nicholson Street line) on 26 October 1940. Initially, the MMTB replaced the line with buses. Within a few years, it was noticed that the bus route were unsuccessful at coping with the high demand of the routes, so conversion of the Northcote line to electric traction was scheduled to take place right after World War II ended. However, it was not until 26 September 1955 that the Northcote/Clifton Hill route finally reopened. The powerhouse was located on the south-east corner of Nicholson and Gertrude Streets. The car shed was located on Queens Parade near the Clifton Hill terminus.

=== Nicholson Street Line (1887-1940) ===
The Nicholson Street line opened on 30 August 1887, and ran between the end of Nicholson Street in North Carlton near Brunswick Road to join the Clifton Hill Line at Gertrude Street, then sharing the line to the City along Bourke Street.

The Nicholson Street line was among the last cable lines to close (along with the Northcote line) on 26 October 1940. Initially, the MMTB replaced the line with buses. Within a few years, it was noticed that the bus route could not cope with the routes' high demand, so conversion of the Northcote line to electric traction was scheduled to take place right after World War II ended. However, the line remained closed until 1956. The powerhouse building still stands on the south-east corner of Nicholson and Gertrude Streets. The car shed was located on Nicholson Street near the Nicholson Street terminus.

=== Brunswick Line (1887-1936) ===
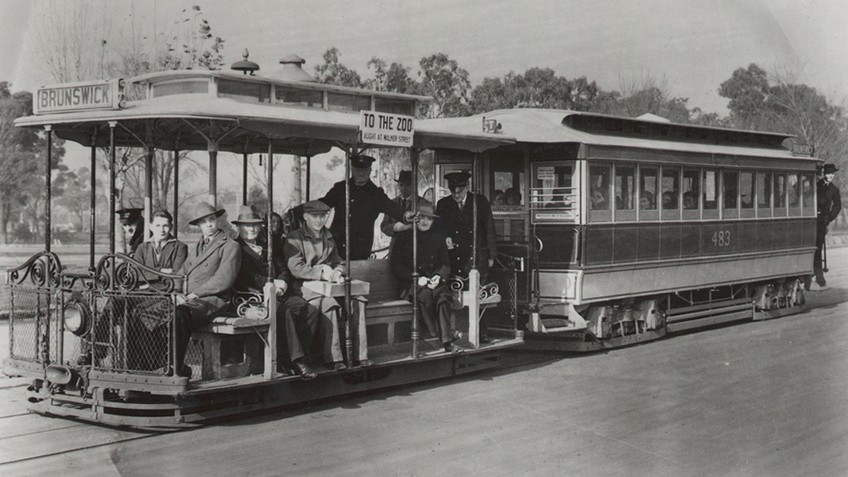
The Brunswick Line, probably on Royal Parade,1930s.

The Brunswick line opened on 1 October 1887, and ran along Sydney Road, Brunswick from Moreland Road, along Royal Parade and the City via Elizabeth Street. A popular horse tram also operated by the MTOC connected the line to the front gates of the Zoo in Royal Park until 1923.

The Brunswick line was converted to electric traction in stages. The line was first truncated to Victoria Street on 29 September 1935. It was further truncated to Leonard Street, Parkville on 17 November 1935. The Brunswick Line was finally closed on 11 January 1936. The powerhouse was located on the north-west corner of Brunswick Road and Black Street. The car shed was located near the Moreland Road terminus.

=== Collingwood Line (1887-1939) ===
The Collingwood line opened on 21 December 1887, and initially ran from the Johnston Street Bridge, Collingwood, then along Lygon Street, and the City via Russell and Lonsdale Street. When the Prahran line opened in 1888, the Collingwood line turned at Swanston Street and operated through-routed services to Prahran.

When the Swanston Street line was truncated back to Princes Bridge on 26 December 1925 for electrification, the Collingwood and North Carlton lines were truncated back to Lonsdale Street. The line was finally closed on 15 April 1939, being converted into a bus service. The powerhouse was located on the north side of Johnston Street, near Brunswick Street. The car shed was located near the Johnston Street Bridge terminus.

=== Brighton Road Line (1888-1925) ===
The Brighton Road line opened on 11 October 1888, and originally ran between the terminus at Brunning Street, Balaclava, along Brighton Road and St Kilda Road, to the City via Princes Bridge and Swanston Street. The initial city terminus was at Flinders Street, but this was extended northwards towards Queensberry Street on 20 January 1889.

The line was truncated from Queensberry Street to Lonsdale Street on 11 February 1924 to allow the electric trams from the north to terminate in the city. Following this point, Brighton Road trams were through-routed to North Melbourne via Lonsdale Street. The Brighton Road tram line fully closed for electrification on 26 December 1925, but the section between City Road and Domain Road remained for Toorak and Prahran trams to use. An electrified line from Lonsdale Street to Brighton Road was completed on 29 August 1926. Both the powerhouse and car shed were located on the south-east corner of St Kilda Road and Bromby Street.

=== Prahran Line (1888-1926) ===
The Prahran line opened on 26 October 1888, and ran between the terminus at Carlisle Street, Balaclava, north along Chapel Street, then west along Toorak Road, Park Street, and Domain Road to St Kilda Road, and the City via Swanston Street, and then through-routed to Collingwood via Lonsdale Street.

The line was truncated to City Road on 26 December 1925, when the Swanston Street line was closed for electrification. The line was further truncated back to Domain Road on 12 January 1926, when the St Kilda Road line was being converted to electric traction. The rest of the line was closed on 28 August 1926. However, Toorak trams still used the line between Domain Road and Chapel Street until October 1 later that year. The powerhouse and the car shed were both located on the north-west corner of Toorak Road and Chapel Street.

=== North Carlton Line (1889-1939) ===
The North Carlton line opened on 9 February 1889, and ran along Rathdowne Street from Park Street in North Carlton, to join the Collingwood line at Elgin Street, to the City at Lonsdale Street. In 1897, the service began running through-routed to Swanston Street, St Kilda Road and Fitzroy Street to St Kilda Beach.

The line was closed on 1 August 1936, being replaced by a bus service, though the Collingwood line continued to use the section of track between Rathdowne Street and Lonsdale Street until it closed on 15 April 1939. Both the powerhouse and the car shed were located at the south-west corner of Rathdowne and Park Streets.

=== Toorak Line (1889-1926) ===
The Toorak line opened on 15 February 1889, and ran between the terminus on Toorak Road at Kooyong, along Toorak Road, then joining the Prahran Line into the City on Swanston Street. The initial city terminus was at Flinders Street, but this was extended northwards to Queensberry Street on 20 January 1889.

With electrification, the line was truncated back to Lonsdale Street on 11 February 1924 to allow the electric trams from the north to terminate in the city. The line was truncated to City Road on 26 December 1925, when the Swanston Street line was closed for electrification. The line was further truncated back to Domain Road on 12 January 1926, when the St Kilda Road line was being converted to electric traction. The rest of the line was finally closed on 1 October 1926. Both the car shed and the powerhouse located on the north-west corner of Toorak Road and Chapel Street.

=== North Melbourne Line (1890-1935) ===
The North Melbourne Line opened on 3 March 1890, and ran along Flemington Road from Flemington Bridge, then through North Melbourne via Abbotsford Street and Victoria Street, and joining the Brunswick Line into the City along Elizabeth Street. Trams initially terminated at Flinders Street, but due to congestion, the line was diverted at Lonsdale Street and through-routed to Brighton Road on 11 February 1924.

The section between Flemington Bridge and Abbotsford Street was closed for electric conversion on 18 July 1925, which was first section cable line in Melbourne to close. The rest of the line closed for conversion to electric traction on 20 July 1935, though the Brunswick Line continued to use the Elizabeth Street section until 28 September 1935. The powerhouse was located on the west corner of Queensberry and Abbotsford Streets. The car shed was located was located near the Flemington Bridge terminus, but later was moved to Victoria Street, near the intersection of Howard Street after the Flemington Bridge section of the line was closed.

=== West Melbourne Line (1890-1935) ===
The West Melbourne line opened on 18 April 1890, and ran between the corner of Abbotsford and Queensberry Streets in West Melbourne (where the North Melbourne Line turned), along Abbotsford, Spencer, and Lonsdale Street City to Elizabeth Street.

The entire line was closed on 20 July 1935, being replaced by buses, though the Elizabeth Street section of the line was used by the Brunswick Line for a few months after until it too closed on 28 September 1935. The powerhouse was located at the south-west corner of Queensberry Street and Abbotsford Street. The car shed for the West Melbourne line was always shared with the North Melbourne line, first using the Flemington Bridge car shed and later using the Victoria Street car shed from 18 July 1925 onwards.

=== South Melbourne Line (1890-1937) ===
The South Melbourne Line opened on 17 June 1890, and ran from South Melbourne Beach along Victoria Avenue, South Melbourne, then Montague, Park and Clarendon Streets, then along City Road and over the new Queensbridge into the City via Market Street to Collins Street, where it followed the Collingwood Line to terminate at Victoria Parade.

After the Collins Street line was closed for electrification on 14 September 1929, the South Melbourne line was truncated back to Market Street. Eventually, the line entire line closed for electrification on 13 July 1937, but the electric line instead ran to the city via Spencer Street, the City Road section being abandoned. The powerhouse was located on the south side of City Road, near Cecil Street. The car shed was located near the South Melbourne terminus on Victoria Avenue.

=== Port Melbourne Line (1890-1937) ===
The Port Melbourne line opened on 20 June 1890, and ran from the terminus on Beach Road near station Pier, Port Melbourne, then along Bay Street and City Road, to join the South Melbourne Line into the City. and City and through to Victoria Parade.

After the Collins Street line was closed for electrification on 14 September 1929, the Port Melbourne line was truncated back to Market Street. Eventually, the line entire line closed on 13 July 1937, being replaced by a bus service. The powerhouse was located on the south side of City Road, near Cecil Street. The car shed was located on Beaconsfield Parade near the Port Melbourne terminus.

=== Clifton Hill - Northcote Line (1890-1940) ===
The Clifton Hill - Northcote line was the only fully privately developed cable tram line, built and operated by the Clifton Hill to Northcote & Preston Tramway Company, opening on 18 February 1890. It ran between the northern terminus of the MTOC Clifton Hill Line, north along High Street, to Dundas Street, Thornbury. Passengers had to walk a short distance over the Merri Street bridge to the terminus of the Clifton Hill line for a through service to the City. Opening just before the 1890s depression and running through sparsely populated districts, the line struggled financially. The Northcote tramway was transferred to the MMTB on 20 February 1920 and in 1925 the two lines were connected together and a through-service was established between Northcote and the City along Bourke Street.

The combined Clifton Hill/Northcote line was the last cable line to close (along with the shared Nicholson Street Line) on 26 October 1940, replaced with buses rather than converted to electric. Within a few years, it was noticed that the bus route could not cope with the high demand, so conversion of the Northcote line to electric traction was scheduled to take place right after World War II ended. However, the works were not completed until 1955. The engine house and car shed were located on the north-east corner of High and Martin Streets.

=== Windsor - St Kilda Line (1891-1925) ===
In order to provide access to the popular St Kilda Beach, the cross-town Windsor - St Kilda Line opened on 17 October 1891, and ran from Chapel Street (and the Prahran Line) near Windsor Railway Station, along Wellington Street, crossing the Brighton Road Line, then Fitzroy Street, the Upper Esplanade (with a view of St Kilda Beach), and Acland Street to terminate at Barkly Street. In 1897, the North Carlton Line began running through-routing down Swanston Street and St Kilda Road, then followed the Windsor Line to Barkly Street.

Windsor - St Kilda Line was the final cable tram line to open, but was also the first major line to close for electrification on 29 August 1925. The powerhouse was located on the north side of Wellington Street, near Marlton Crescent. The car shed was located near the St Kilda terminus on Acland Street.
