= Northcote Plaza =

Shopping centre in Melbourne, Australia

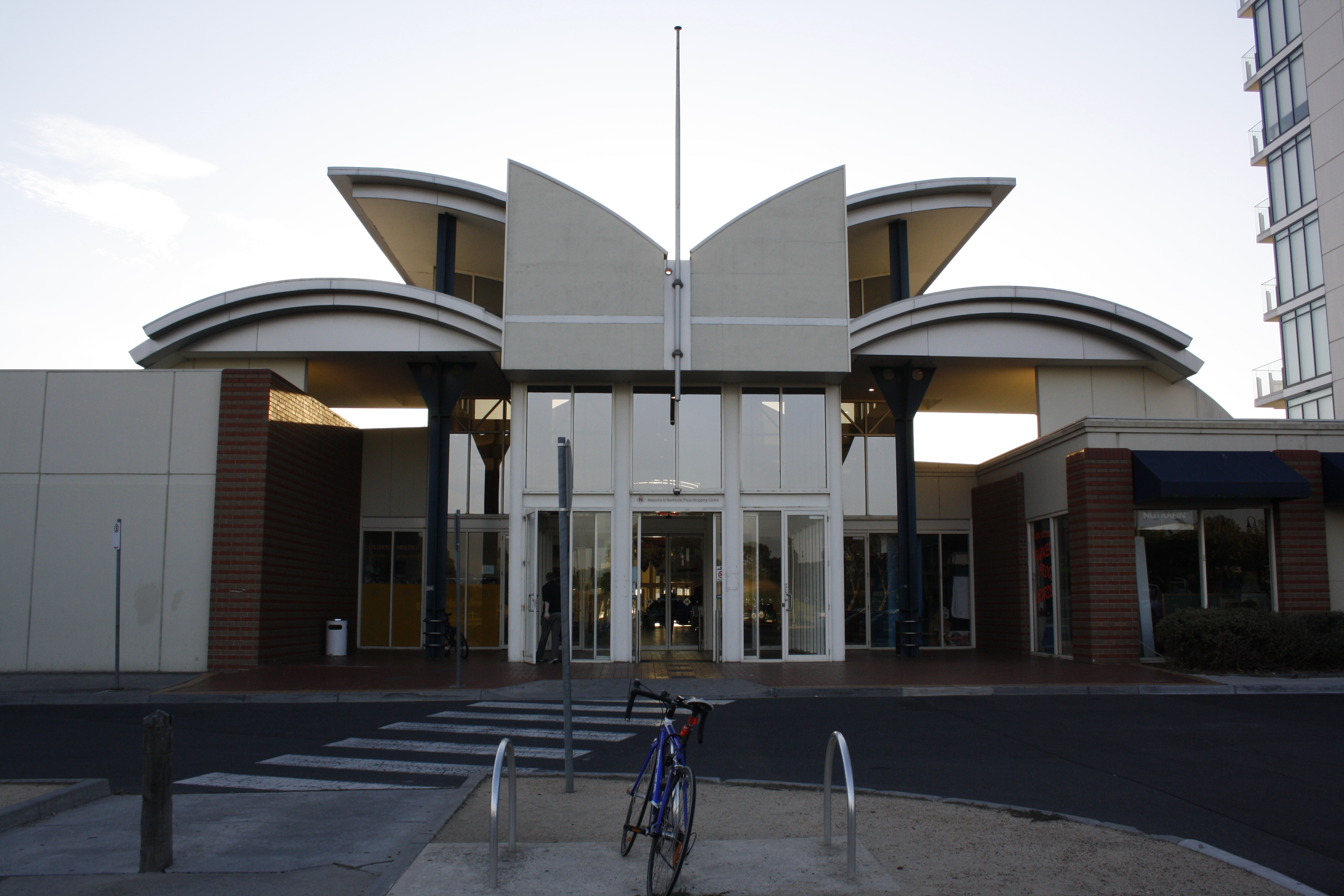
- Entrance to Northcote Plaza in 2012
- Location: Northcote, Victoria, Australia
- Coordinates: 37°46′8″S 145°0′6″E
- Address: 3 Separation Street
- Opened: Early 1980s
- Num. of stores: Over 60
- Website: northcoteplaza.com

Northcote Plaza is a sub-regional shopping centre located in Northcote, in the inner northern suburbs of Melbourne, the state capital of Victoria, Australia. It is located adjacent to All Nations Park.

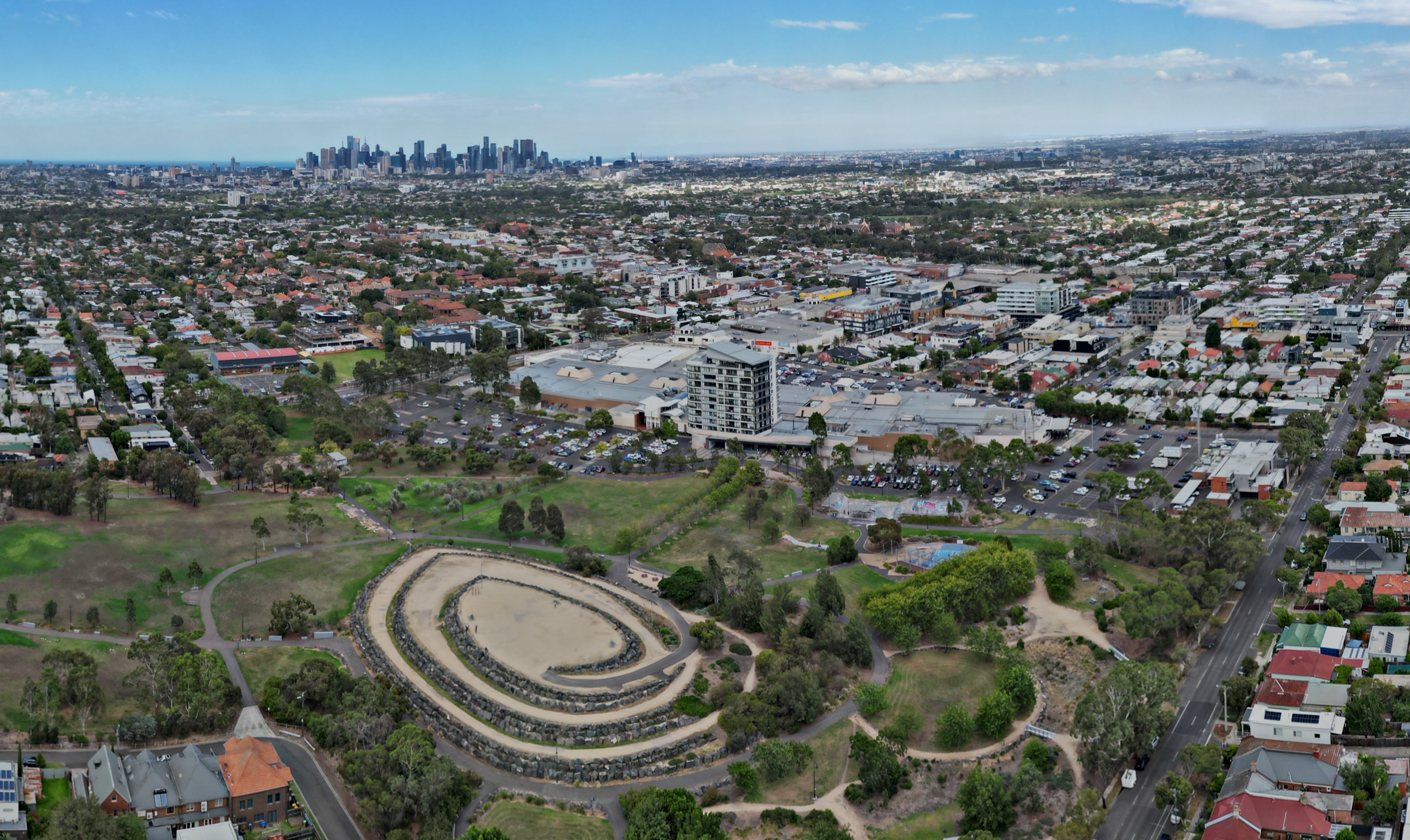
Northcote Plaza with All Nations Park in the foreground

It was built on the site of the former kilns of Northcote Brickworks Ltd, and opened in the early 1980s. As of 2016, it is used by people of a broad range of ages and ethnic backgrounds, offering everyday consumption rather than the lifestyle-focused consumption of the city's High Street.

== Retailers ==
There are over 60 different shops in the Plaza. The centre as of 2024 has two Coles supermarkets. As of 2016 it also included a discount department store, banking and post office services, bakeries, chemists, a newsagent, a butcher, a health food store, a key cutter, a travel agent, a pet shop, takeaway food outlets, telecommunications retailers, low-cost clothing and homewares stores, and 'two dollar' shops.

== Northcote Plaza Appreciation Society ==
The Northcote Plaza Appreciation Society is a long-running Facebook group and loose online community established in 2007 that humorously shows appreciation for the shopping centre. As of 2023, the group had over 9,000 members. This group has nicknamed the centre 'Norplaz', and its members 'Plazafarians'.

Its posts have focused on several peculiarities surrounding the shopping centre. These include comparisons between its two Coles stores, the pigeons at the centre, the Golden Head sculptures at All Nations Park that have faced westward toward the centre, and a series of golden sculptures of toilets in the area. Also discussed are a set of at least a dozen abandoned cars in its car park, including a 1986 Ford Fairlane that has been parked at the shopping centre at least since the group began, remaining there as a tribute to a shopper who died over 15 years ago.
