= Northcote, Victoria =

Northcote
- Suburb
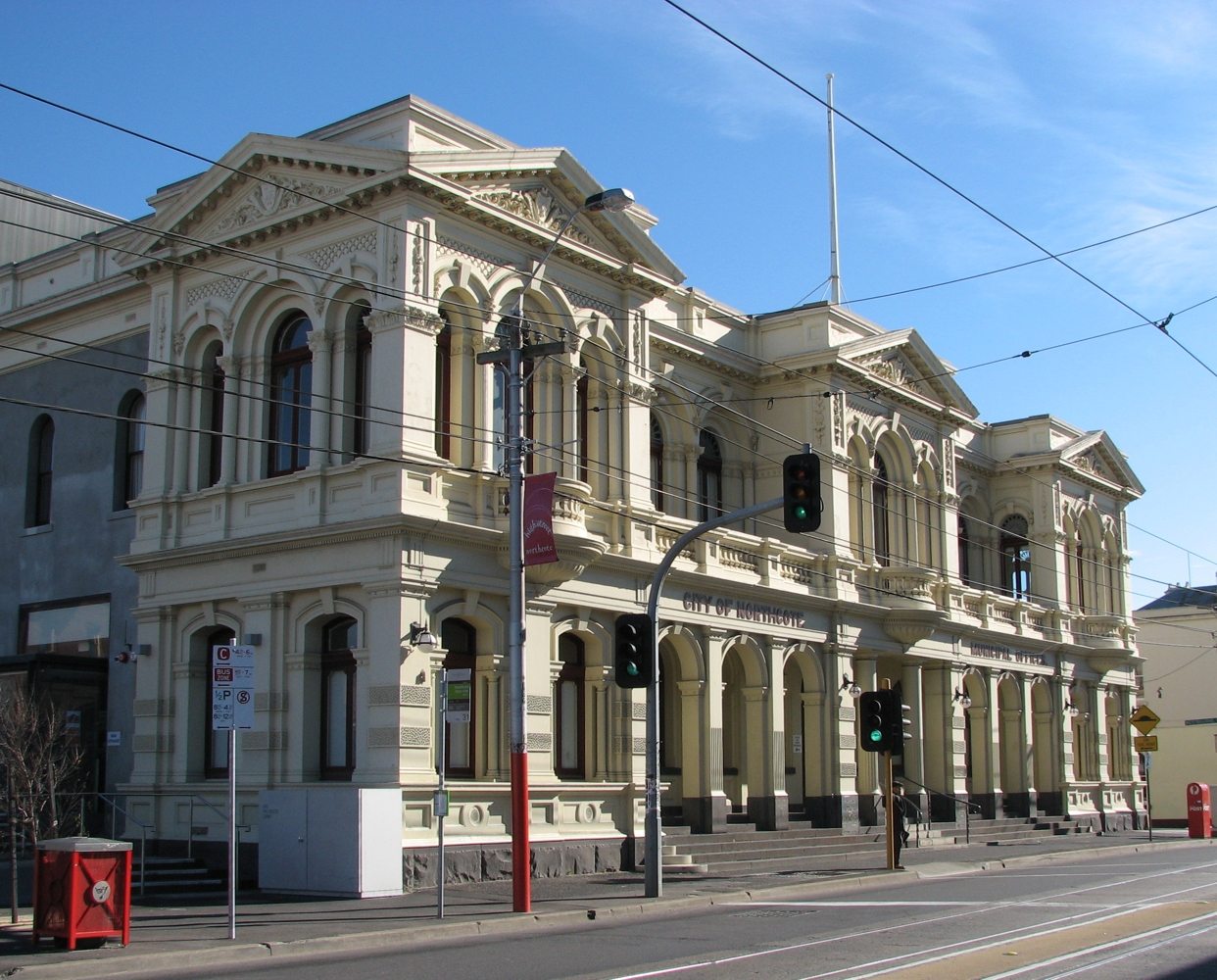
- Northcote Town Hall

- Interactive map of Northcote
- Coordinates: 37.7722°S 144.9994°E
- Country: Australia
- State: Victoria
- City: Melbourne
- LGA: City of Darebin
- Location: 7 km (4.3 mi) NE of Melbourne

Government
  - State electorate: Northcote
  - Federal division: Cooper

Area
  - Total: 6.3 km^{2} (2.4 sq mi)
- Elevation: 55 m (180 ft)

Population
  - Total: 25,276 (2021 census)
  - Density: 4,010/km^{2} (10,390/sq mi)
- Postcode: 3070
Suburbs around Northcote
| Brunswick East | Thornbury | Thornbury |
| Brunswick East | Northcote | Fairfield |
| Fitzroy North | Clifton Hill | Fairfield |

Northcote (/ˈnɔːθkət/) is an inner suburb in Melbourne, Victoria, Australia, 6 km (3.7 mi) north-east of the central business district, within the City of Darebin local government area. Northcote recorded a population of 25,276 at the 2021 census.

== History ==
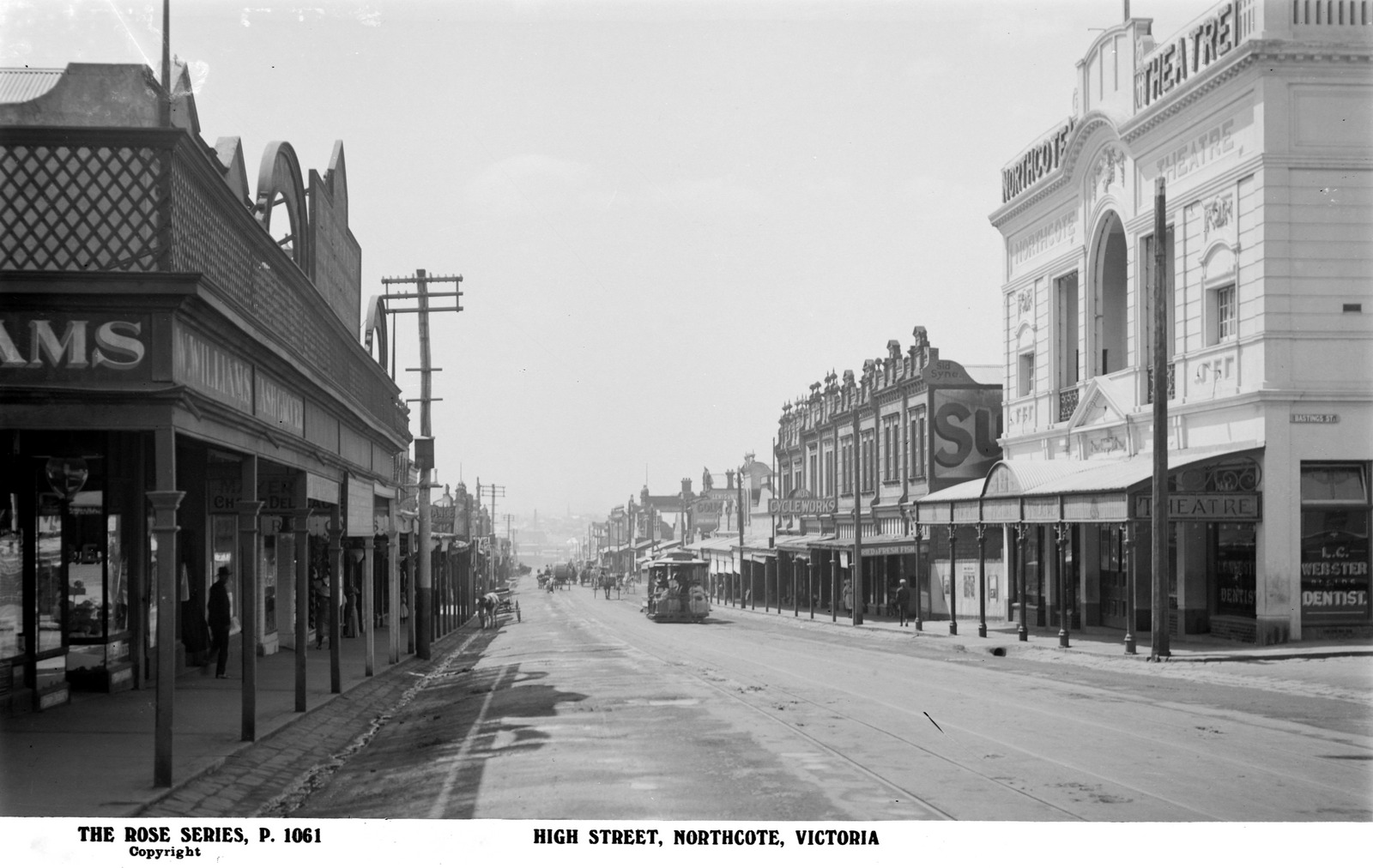
High Street, with a view of tram route 86 and the Northcote Theatre

The southerly surveyed portion is now Westgarth. It was the area further north of present-day Westgarth which saw settlement and development, particularly around the mansion built by William Rucker on Bayview Street in 1842 (the area now known as Ruckers Hill). Suburban subdivision took place between 1853 and 1855, when Northcote was probably named by Surveyor-General Sir Andrew Clarke after British parliamentarian Sir Stafford Northcote. Large, expensive houses were built throughout the Victorian gold rush of the 1850s. Lower Plenty Road (or High Street as it is known today) became the central street of Northcote, instead of Westgarth Street as initially proposed. A bridge was built across the Merri Creek in 1858, making access to the area more convenient. Throughout the 1850s, churches, schools, and hotels were built. The Pilgrim Inn became the Red House hotel, at the back of which the owner, G. F. Goyder, constructed a racetrack, on which steeplechase and walking races were conducted.

Throughout the 1880s, land in Northcote was relatively cheap. This attracted speculative property investors, as well as people of limited financial means, setting in place Northcote's reputation as a working-class suburb. More businesses opened along High Street, as well as churches and schools. In 1890, the Little Sisters of the Poor began an aged care facility St Georges Road. The building remains extant, repurposed as a monastery for the Greek Orthodox Church. The town hall was built in 1890, the same year the Borough of Northcote was proclaimed. The Northcote Football Club was established in 1898, with its home ground at Northcote Park. The Northcote Picture Theatre opened in 1912 and its building is one of the oldest surviving cinemas in Victoria; repurposed since 2022 as a live music venue.

The idea to offer a public library was raised in the early 1880s. In 1883, a room in the Town Hall was set aside for library purposes. In 1890 a proper, although small, library was established in the Town Surveyor's office. In 1907 the Carnegie Foundation, set up by Scottish philanthropist Andrew Carnegie, was approached, and Northcote Free Library, a Carnegie library, opened in 1911 as one of only four in Australia. When the library moved in 1985, the Carnegie Building was converted for use by the Council.

Throughout the 1920s, development grew along St Georges Road. Northcote High School opened in 1926. The Preston and Northcote Community Hospital (commonly known as "PANCH") at 205 Bell Street, opened in 1958 and relocated to the Northern Hospital in Epping in 1998.

=== Heritage listings ===
The following places in Northcote are listed on the Victorian Heritage Register:

- Little Sisters of the Poor Home for the Aged (former), 104–112 St Georges Road
- Northcote Theatre, 212–220 High Street
- Terrace Houses at 186–192 Clarke Street
- Yan Yean Water Supply System, also through Bundoora, Reservoir, Preston, and Thornbury

== Public transport ==
Access to Northcote via public transport was initially via the Inner Circle line, which when linked to the Heidelberg line in 1888, ran close to the southern border of the suburb. The line to Whittlesea was opened in 1891, creating a direct line to Northcote, although the line initially journeyed via Royal Park, Carlton North and Fitzroy North, before a line was built from Clifton Hill to Melbourne through the suburbs of Collingwood and Richmond in 1901 to 1903. The northern section of the Inner Circle Line was closed to passengers in 1948, leaving the eastern section (from Melbourne to Clifton Hill, via Richmond and Collingwood).

=== Bus ===
Eight bus routes service Northcote:

- 250 : Melbourne CBD (Queen Street) – La Trobe University (Bundoora Campus). Operated by Kinetic Melbourne.
- 251 : Melbourne CBD (Queen Street) – Northland Shopping Centre. Operated by Kinetic Melbourne.
- 506 : Moonee Ponds Junction – Westgarth station via Brunswick. Operated by Dysons.
- 508 : Alphington station – Moonee Ponds Junction via Northcote and Brunswick. Operated by Dysons.
- 510 : Essendon station – Ivanhoe station via Brunswick West, Moreland station, Thornbury and Fairfield. Operated by Kinetic Melbourne.
- 546 : Heidelberg station – Queen Victoria Market via Clifton Hill, Carlton and the University of Melbourne. Operated by Dysons.
- 552 : North East Reservoir – Northcote Plaza via High Street. Operated by Dysons.
- 567 : Northcote – Regent station via Northland Shopping Centre. Operated by Dysons.

=== Train ===
Northcote has five railway stations along two lines. The Mernda line serves Merri, Northcote and Croxton stations. The Hurstbridge line serves Westgarth and Dennis stations.

=== Tram ===
A cable tram began operations along High Street in 1890. It was replaced in the early 1940s by a double-decker bus service, which was in turn replaced with an electric tram service in the 1950s (now tram route). An electric tram service opened along St Georges Road in 1920 (now tram route).

== 21st century gentrification ==
Northcote as a suburb has undergone gentrification over the last 25 years. In the 1990s, Northcote was classified as a low socio-economic area relative to the rest of Melbourne. During the 1996 to 2006 decade, the number of two earner households rose by ten percentage points; the share of households in the top income quintile went from 14 to 19 per cent; and, the percentage of persons age 15 years and above with a bachelor's degree or high rose from 14 to 27 per cent (a much greater increase than experienced by Melbourne as a whole). In 2011, a report from the Australian Housing and Urban Research Institute at Swinburne and Monash universities revealed Northcote had experienced the most intense gentrification of any Melbourne suburb in recent years. In 2013, Northcote was one of only four Melbourne suburbs whose median house price was at an all-time peak. This has resulted in a significant change in the demographics of the suburb. An AHURI report states that between 2001 and 2006, almost 35 per cent of the members of vulnerable groups, including low-income households, single parent families and immigrants, had moved out of the area.

Since 2006, the most significant increases in occupation have come from those working in professional and managerial roles, with less residents now living in Northcote employed in manual labour positions. As a result, residents of Northcote now earn on average $1536 a week, $200 per week higher than the Melbourne average. These changes in the population and demographics of Northcote and the greater Darebin area, have led to increases in the amount of cafes, bars, restaurants and other small businesses operating in the region. Estimates suggest that the greater Darebin area has seen its gross regional product increase by $1 billion in the last 10 years, to $5.23 billion.

In 2021, 72.3% of residents in Northcote were born in Australia. However, 51.3% of those residents born in Australia had at least one parent born overseas, and 34.2% had both parents born overseas. This reflects the large numbers of second-generation families living in the area.

The most common languages spoken in Northcote other than English are:

- Greek (6.5%)
- Italian (2.7%)
- Mandarin (1.0%)
- Vietnamese (0.9%)
- Spanish (0.9%)

== Parks ==
=== All Nations Park ===
All Nations Park is located adjacent to the Northcote Plaza Shopping Centre (which itself opened in October 1981 at the site of the old brickworks).

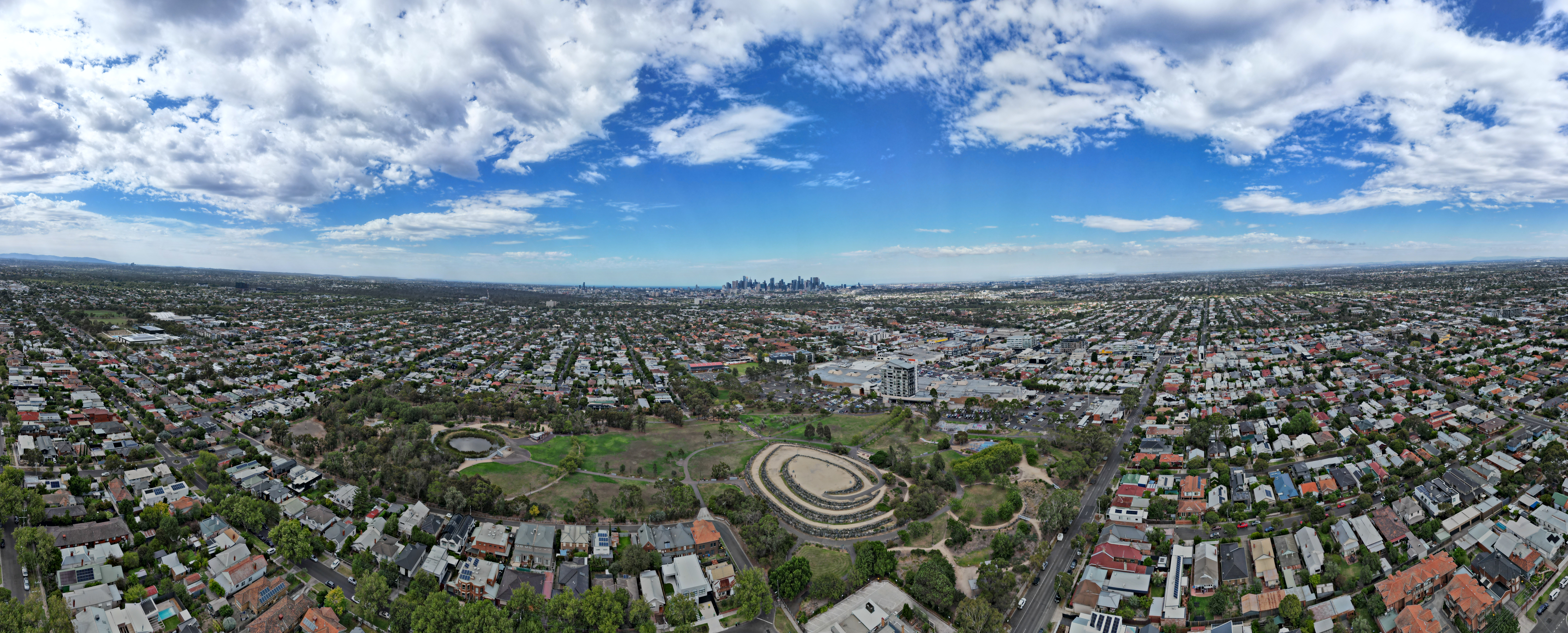
All Nations Park at Northcote facing Melbourne skyline

All Nations Park is a contemporary 13 hectare regional park created on the site of the former Northcote brickworks. When the brickworks closed the site became a tip. In the 1980s, the rubbish still remaining in the site was sealed beneath a compacted clay 'cap', and was then covered in soil, including the formation of an artificial hill which newcomers to the area sometimes mistake for Ruckers Hill (actually located a few hundred metres to the southeast). There are also vents built into the ground to vent the gases produced by the landfill underneath, which prevents pressure under the soil from building up and potentially causing an explosion.

There are skating facilities, as well as basketball courts, play equipment and picnic facilities. There is a lot of open space. There is also a large native garden giving special attention to plants indigenous to the area, and a series of ponds.

The park was also the location of a December 2008 shooting involving police and a 15-year-old boy named Tyler Cassidy. Cassidy was shot several times and died on location., Tyler Cassidy is the youngest person confirmed to have been killed by Police in Australia.

=== Batman Park ===
(Coordinates 37.7681°S 144.9927°E ) is a 1.6 hectares (4.0 acres) metropolitan park. It was purchased by the Northcote Council in 1907 and is recognised for its historical significance as the second oldest park in Northcote. It hosts many established trees for shade and is close to buses, trains and trams. As part of a wider campaign to remove the controversial explorer John Batman's name from public places and buildings, the park was renamed from Batman Park to Gumbri Park in May 2017, in honour of the last Aboriginal girl to be born on Coranderrk mission. 1n 2018, the name change was rejected by the direct descendants of Gumbri, Ian and Gary Hunter, so the name change was rejected by the Office of Geographic Names. The current status of the name change is unknown as a result. The park hosts a playcentre, a playground, toilets, and the Pioneer's Retreat building, currently used by an incorporated association, We-Cycle.

=== Johnson Park ===
Johnson Park is a popular large neighbourhood park of almost two hectares. The land Johnson Park occupies was purchased by the former City of Northcote in 1859. The traditional owners of land where Johnson Park stands today are the Wurundjeri-Willampatriliny people. In 1913, five acres was bought in Bastings Street on the flat low-lying basalt soils between Rucker Hill and Darebin Creek. Originally known as the East Ward Park, it was slowly transformed into what was to become Johnson Park today.

== Politics ==
The state seat of Northcote is currently represented by Kat Theophanous, a member of the Labor Party and the federal seat of Cooper, which covers Northcote, is held by Ged Kearney, also from the ALP. The state seat of Northcote was one of the safest Labor seats in the entire country, being held by a Labor member continuously from 1927 to 2017. After a steady increase in their primary vote from the early 2000s, The Greens eventually won the seat in the 2017 by-election following the death of Labor member Fiona Richardson, represented by Lidia Thorpe. Labor then regained the seat following the 2018 Victorian state election.

The ALP in Northcote has been the subject of a number of academic studies. Ethnic branches were established in Northcote during 1975, the first in Victoria. The first branches were Westgarth, a Greek branch, and Croxton, an Italian branch. An additional Greek branch, Northcote East, was also established in the area.

The 2022 Victorian state election campaign has seen alleged vandalism of election advertisements, particularly targeted at ALP Candidate Kat Theophanous.

== Sport ==
The area surrounding Northcote is home to local sporting teams:

- Northcote Cricket Club, which plays in Victorian Premier Cricket, the top level of district cricket in Victoria.
- Northcote City SC who compete in the Victorian Premier League, second tier behind the A-League.
- Northcote Swimming & Lifesaving Club Inc.
- Northcote Bowls Club
- Northcote United Cricket Club
- Dennis Cricket club
- Smashed Indoor Cricket Team, which is the longest running team at Northcote Indoor Sports.
- Northcote Park Football Club, an Australian rules football team, competes in the Northern Football League.
- Northcote Junior Football Club (NJFC), a junior Australian rules football team allied with Northcote Park, competes in the Northern Football League junior division.
- Golfers play at the course of the Northcote Golf Club on Normanby Avenue, in the neighbouring suburb of Thornbury.

== Schools ==
- Pender's Grove Primary School (Government co-ed primary school)
- Wales Street Primary School (Government co-ed primary school)
- Westgarth Primary School (Government co-ed primary school)
- Northcote Primary School (Government co-ed primary school)
- Santa Maria College (Catholic all-girls high school)
- Northcote High School (Government co-ed high school)
- St. Josephs Primary School (Catholic co-ed primary school)

== Notable people ==
- Bill Barry – State Parliamentarian and Minister. First leader of the Australian Labor Party (Anti-Communist), a party that became the Democratic Labor Party in 1957.
- Nick Birbilis – Executive Dean of Science, Engineering and Built Environment at Deakin University and notable academic in the field of materials science and engineering
- Alan Bird – Federal Parliamentarian and Northcote Mayor and Councillor during his period as a parliamentarian
- Cameron Bird – musician from Architecture in Helsinki
- Helen Buckingham – Upper House Victorian Parliamentarian from 2002 to 2006
- John Cain (senior) – 34th Victorian Premier
- John Cain (junior) – 41st Victorian Premier
- Don Chipp – Federal Parliamentarian, Minister, and founder of the Australian Democrats
- Goldsmith Collins – Footballer and vexatious litigant.
- Scod (Scott Edgar), Yon (Simon Hall) and Gatesy (Steven Gates) – Comedians from Tripod..
- Bill Henson – Contemporary art photographer
- Douglas Nicholls – aboriginal Church of Christ Pastor, Northcote and Fitzroy footballer, and Governor of South Australia (1976–1977)
- Jack Regan – Collingwood footballer, born and recruited from Northcote, who became known as the "Prince of Full-backs".
- Normie Rowe - Singer and songwriter.
- John Tasioulas – Director of Institute for Ethics in AI and Professor of Ethics and Legal Philosophy at University of Oxford and first Greek-Australian Rhodes Scholar
- Frank Wilkes – former Leader of the Opposition in Victorian Parliament
- Frank Wilson – Stage and television actor, television game show host and Logie Award winner
- Metal band Blood Duster

== See also ==
- City of Northcote – Northcote was previously within this former local government area.
